= Sarah A. L. Merriam =

American judge (born 1971)

Sarah Merriam
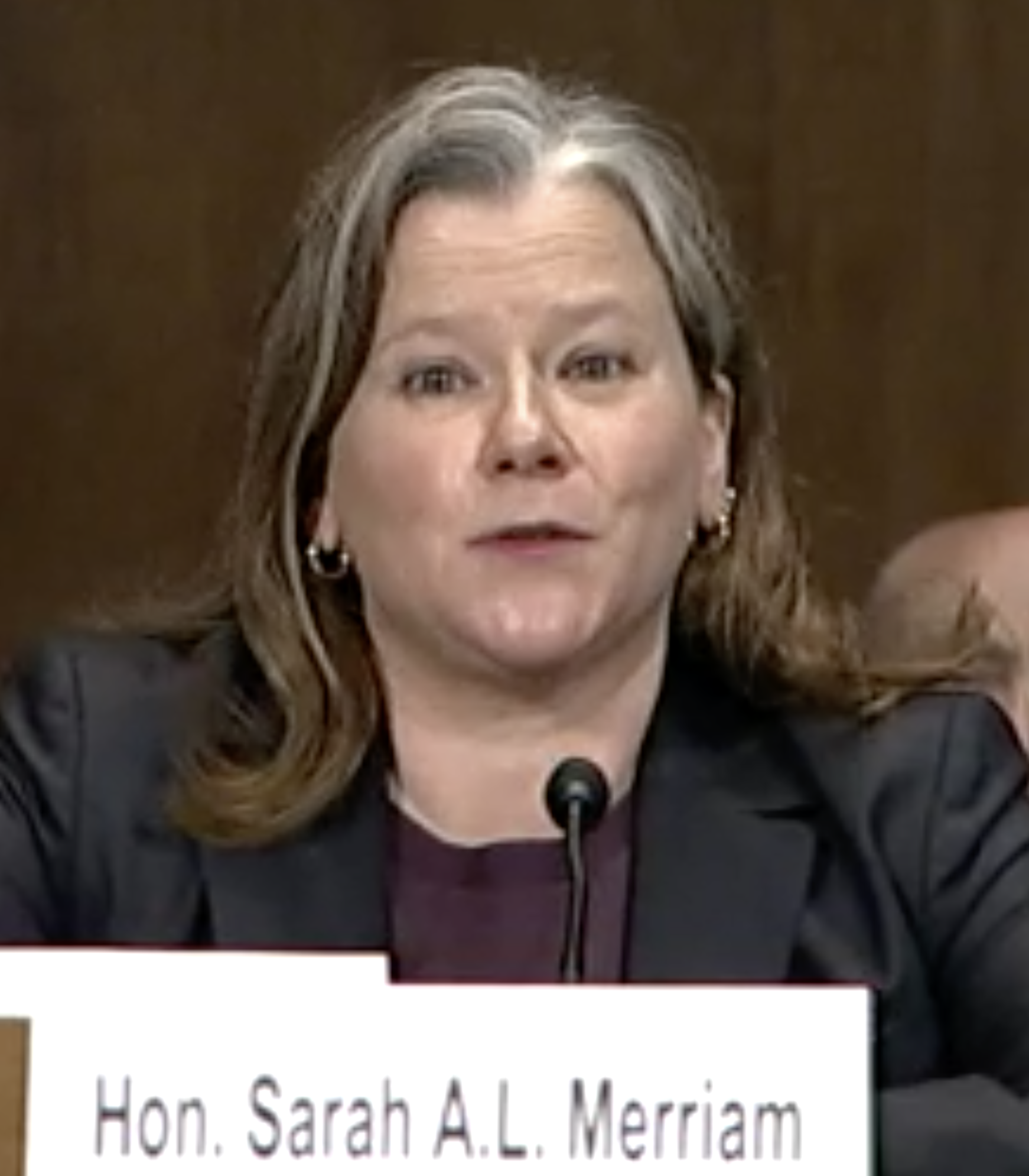

Judge of the United States Court of Appeals for the Second Circuit
- Incumbent
- Assumed office September 23, 2022
- Appointed by: Joe Biden
- Preceded by: Susan L. Carney

Judge of the United States District Court for the District of Connecticut
- In office October 8, 2021 – September 28, 2022
- Appointed by: Joe Biden
- Preceded by: Janet C. Hall
- Succeeded by: Sarah F. Russell

Personal details
- Born: 1971 (age 54–55) Honolulu, Hawaii, U.S.
- Party: Democratic
- Education: Georgetown University (BA); Yale University (JD); Duke University (LLM)

Sarah Ann Leilani Merriam (born 1971) is an American attorney serving as a United States circuit judge of the United States Court of Appeals for the Second Circuit. She is a former United States magistrate judge of the United States District Court for the District of Connecticut and former district judge of the same court.

== Early life and education ==
Merriam was born in Honolulu, Hawaii, and raised in New Haven, Connecticut, where she attended the Hopkins School. She earned a Bachelor of Arts from Georgetown University in 1993, a Juris Doctor from Yale Law School in 2000, and a Master of Laws in judicial studies from the Duke University School of Law in 2018.

== Career ==
Merriam clerked for Judge Alvin W. Thompson of the United States District Court for the District of Connecticut from 2000 to 2002 and Judge Thomas Meskill of the United States Court of Appeals for the Second Circuit from 2002 to 2003. She began her career as an associate with Cowdery, Ecker & Murphy in Hartford, Connecticut. From 2007 to 2015, Merriam served as an assistant public defender for the United States District Court for the District of Connecticut.

Merriam was political director for a state employee union and helped manage the campaigns of two Democratic United States Senators, Chris Murphy and Chris Dodd.

== Judicial service ==
=== United States magistrate judge ===
In March 2015, Merriam was selected as a magistrate judge of the United States District Court for the District of Connecticut. She replaced Judge Holly B. Fitzsimmons, who retired. She was sworn in on April 3, 2015. Her service terminated on October 8, 2021, when she was elevated to a district court judge, and was succeeded by Maria Garcia.

=== District court service ===
On June 15, 2021, President Joe Biden nominated Merriam to serve as a United States district judge for the United States District Court for the District of Connecticut to the seat vacated by Judge Janet C. Hall, who assumed senior status on January 21, 2021. On July 14, 2021, a hearing on her nomination was held before the Senate Judiciary Committee. On August 5, 2021, her nomination was favorably reported by the committee by a 13–9 vote. On October 4, 2021, Majority Leader Chuck Schumer filed cloture on her nomination. On October 6, 2021, the United States Senate invoked cloture on her nomination by a 53–47 vote. Her nomination was confirmed later that day by a 54–46 vote. She received her judicial commission on October 8, 2021. She was sworn in on October 12, 2021. Her service as a district judge was terminated on September 28, 2022, when she was elevated to the court of appeals.

=== Court of appeals service ===
On April 27, 2022, President Joe Biden announced he would nominate Merriam to serve as a United States circuit judge for the United States Court of Appeals for the Second Circuit. On May 19, 2022, her nomination was sent to the Senate. President Biden nominated Merriam to the seat to be vacated by Judge Susan L. Carney, who announced her intent to assume senior status upon confirmation of a successor. On May 25, 2022, a hearing on her nomination was held before the Senate Judiciary Committee. On June 16, 2022, her nomination was favorably reported by the committee by a 12–10 vote. On September 12, 2022, Majority Leader Chuck Schumer filed cloture on her nomination. On September 14, 2022, the United States Senate invoked cloture on her nomination by a 52–47 vote. On September 15, 2022, her nomination was confirmed by a 53–44 vote. She received her judicial commission on September 23, 2022.

=== Controversies ===
Merriam has been accused of bullying her law clerks as part of an extremely rare formal complaint filed by the non-profit the Legal Accountability Project on behalf of law clerks who feared they could not speak up without damage to themselves. The complaint, filed on December 30, 2025, alleged that Merriam maintained a "workplace climate characterized by fear, oppressive control, intimidation, humiliation, and bullying." A first complaint alleging Merriam treated her staff "overly harsh" was filed in 2022, and it resolved after Merriam "committed to receiving counseling and training on workplace conduct, informing clerks that they could report concerns to the chief judge, and permitting the court's director of workplace relations to check in with her clerks midway into their terms until August 2025 to ensure compliance." The federal judiciary rarely publicizes or addresses complaints of misconduct against judges, and at first tried to keep Merriam's name confidential.

Legal offices
Preceded by Janet C. Hall	Judge of the United States District Court for the District of Connecticut; 2021–2022	Succeeded by Sarah F. Russell
Preceded by Susan L. Carney	Judge of the United States Court of Appeals for the Second Circuit; 2022–present	Incumbent
