= Zampano =

Zampano is an Italian surname, may refer to:

- Francesco Zampano (born 1993), Italian footballer
- Giuseppe Zampano (born 1993), Italian footballer
- Robert Carmine Zampano Federal Judge for the United States
- A character in the film La Strada
- A character in House of Leaves
- Zampano, an album by 747s
