= Deirdre M. Daly =

American attorney

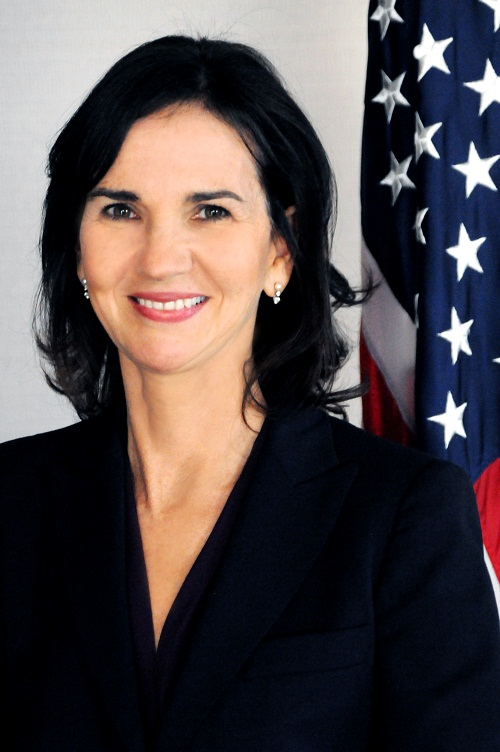

United States Attorney for the District of Connecticut
- In office May 14, 2013 – October 27, 2017; Acting: May 14, 2013 – May 28, 2014
- President: Barack Obama; Donald Trump
- Preceded by: David B. Fein
- Succeeded by: John H. Durham

Personal details
- Born: June 17, 1959 (age 67) Dublin, Ireland
- Party: Democratic
- Education: Dartmouth College (BA); Georgetown University (JD)

Deirdre M. Daly (born June 17, 1959) is an Irish-American attorney who served as the United States Attorney for the District of Connecticut from 2013 to 2017.

== Early life and education ==
Daly was born in a nursing home in Dublin, Ireland. Daly is the daughter of Margaret Noble Wallace and Michael J. Daly, who was awarded the Medal of Honor for his service in World War II. Her uncle, T.F. Gilroy Daly, had been a federal judge. Her great-great-grandfather, Thomas Francis Gilroy, served as Mayor of New York City in 1893–1894.

Deirdre Daly graduated from Dartmouth College and the Georgetown University Law Center. In college, she studied in Ireland. She served as a law clerk for federal Judge Lloyd Francis MacMahon of the United States District Court for the Southern District of New York.

== Career ==
From 1985 to 1997, Daly was an assistant U.S. attorney in the Southern District of New York. Daly was next a partner at Daly & Pavlis LLC. From July 2010, she served as the first assistant U.S. attorney in Connecticut.

She started serving as the acting and interim U.S. attorney for Connecticut in May 2013. President Barack Obama nominated Daly to serve as U.S. attorney for Connecticut in March 2014. The U.S. Senate confirmed her nomination in May 2014.

Daly submitted her resignation when it was requested on March 10, 2017, but the resignation was declined so that she could continue serving in office until October 2017 and thereby complete 20 years of service with the Justice Department. She was, along with Richard S. Hartunian, one of two U.S. Attorneys granted this extension. She officially resigned at midnight on October 27, 2017.

In June 2018, Daly joined the private law firm Finn Dixon & Herling.

== Personal life ==
Daly married Alfred Pavlis. They have three children.

She served as Grand Marshal of the 2018 St. Patrick’s Day Parade in Norwalk, Connecticut.

== See also ==
- 2017 dismissal of U.S. attorneys
