= William H. Timbers =

American judge (1915–1994)

Senior Judge of the United States Court of Appeals for the Second Circuit
- In office July 10, 1981 – November 26, 1994

Judge of the United States Court of Appeals for the Second Circuit
- In office July 29, 1971 – July 10, 1981
- Appointed by: Richard Nixon
- Preceded by: Robert P. Anderson
- Succeeded by: George C. Pratt

Chief Judge of the United States District Court for the District of Connecticut
- In office 1964–1971
- Preceded by: Robert P. Anderson
- Succeeded by: Mosher Joseph Blumenfeld

Judge of the United States District Court for the District of Connecticut
- In office September 2, 1960 – August 6, 1971
- Appointed by: Dwight D. Eisenhower
- Preceded by: J. Joseph Smith
- Succeeded by: Jon O. Newman

Personal details
- Born: William Homer Timbers; September 5, 1915 Yonkers, New York, U.S.
- Died: November 26, 1994 (aged 79) Suffield, Connecticut, U.S.
- Education: Dartmouth College (AB); Yale Law School (LLB)

William Homer Timbers (September 5, 1915 – November 26, 1994) was a United States circuit judge of the United States Court of Appeals for the Second Circuit and previously was a United States district judge of the United States District Court for the District of Connecticut. In addition to his legal and judicial career, Timbers was known as dog enthusiast who served a term as chairman of the board of the American Kennel Club.

== Education and career ==
Timbers was born on September 5, 1915, in Yonkers, New York. He grew up in Glen Ridge, New Jersey. Timbers received his Artium Baccalaureus degree from Dartmouth College magna cum laude and Phi Beta Kappa in 1937. He was selected as a Rhodes Scholar. Timbers received his Bachelor of Laws from Yale Law School in 1940. Timbers was in private practice in New York City from 1940 to 1948 at the law firm of Davis, Polk, Wardwell, Sutherland & Kiendl. Timbers then practiced in Stamford, Connecticut from 1948 to 1953 as a partner of Cummings & Lockwood. From 1953 to 1956, Timbers served as general counsel of the Securities and Exchange Commission. In 1956, Timbers returned to New York City and became a partner at the law firm of Skadden, Arps, Slate & Timbers (now Skadden, Arps, Slate, Meagher & Flom). Timbers remained there until joining the federal bench in 1960. Timbers served as chairman of the Republican Town Committee in Darien, Connecticut, and was a delegate at the 1956 Republican National Convention in San Francisco, California. Timbers also served as a member of the Darien Board of Finance.

== Federal judicial service ==
Timbers was nominated to United States District Court for the District of Connecticut on August 27, 1959, but received no vote in the United States Senate.

Timbers was nominated by President Dwight D. Eisenhower on January 11, 1960, to a seat on the United States District Court for the District of Connecticut vacated by Judge J. Joseph Smith. He was confirmed by the United States Senate on September 1, 1960, and received his commission on September 2, 1960. He served as Chief Judge from 1964 to 1971. His service terminated on August 6, 1971, due to his elevation to the Second Circuit.

Timbers was nominated by President Richard Nixon on May 13, 1971, to a seat on the United States Court of Appeals for the Second Circuit vacated by Judge Robert P. Anderson. He was confirmed by the Senate on July 29, 1971, and received his commission on July 29, 1971. He assumed senior status on July 10, 1981. He took inactive senior status in the summer of 1993. His service terminated on November 26, 1994, due to his death.

=== Notable cases ===
In 1967, Timbers struck down the Lindbergh kidnapping law as an unconstitutional infringement of the right to trial by jury because under the statute a defendant was more likely to be sentenced to death sentence if he opted for a jury trial (rather than a bench trial or a guilty plea).

In 1990, Timbers joined in a majority opinion (written by Judge Frank Altimari, with Judge Thomas J. Meskill concurring in part and dissenting in part) holding that the New York City Subway system could bar panhandlers. The court found that begging was not expressive conduct protected by the First Amendment.

In 1992, Timbers wrote a majority opinion that upheld, by a 2–1 vote, a district court ruling that blocked the extradition of former Irish Republican Army (IRA) member Peter McMullen to Britain, on the ground that the 1986 Supplementary Extradition Treaty between the United States and Britain unlawfully singled out McMullen and two other men for punishment.

In 1986, Timbers dissented from the court's 2-1 decision (the majority being written by Judge Jon O. Newman) striking down the Bail Reform Act of 1984, which allowed preventive pretrial detention, on Fifth Amendment and Eighth Amendment grounds. Timbers wrote that Congress had approved pretrial detention in cases where it provided "needed protection" against "those defendants found to constitute a danger to the community."

== Nomination of Meskill to the Second Circuit ==
Timbers, along with Senator Lowell Weicker, supported the nomination of Connecticut governor Thomas J. Meskill to the Second Circuit despite opposition from the American Bar Association's Standing Committee on the Federal Judiciary. Timbers wrote a letter in support of Meskill to President Gerald Ford.

== Other activities ==
Timbers bred, raised, and exhibited Norwegian elkhounds. He was an enthusiast of the breed from 1958 onward. He served as president of the Ox Ridge Club and the Norwegian Elkhound Association of America. Timbers was also active in the American Kennel Club; he served as chairman of the AKC New York Trial Board (1965–68) and was for fourteen years as a director of the AKC before becoming chairman of the AKC board in 1982.

Timbers was an elder and trustee of the Noroton Presbyterian Church in Darien.

== Death ==
Timbers lived in Darien, Connecticut. He died on November 26, 1994, in Suffield, Connecticut, at the age of 79, from kidney failure. He was survived by his wife Charlotte MacLachlan Timbers and four children.

== Notes ==
Legal offices
Preceded by J. Joseph Smith	Judge of the United States District Court for the District of Connecticut; 1960–1971	Succeeded by Jon O. Newman
Preceded by Robert P. Anderson	Chief Judge of the United States District Court for the District of Connecticut; 1964–1971	Succeeded by Mosher Joseph Blumenfeld
Preceded by Robert P. Anderson	Judge of the United States Court of Appeals for the Second Circuit; 1971–1994	Succeeded by George C. Pratt
