= Judge Platt =

Judge Platt may refer to:

- Casper Platt (1892–1965), judge of the United States District Court for the Eastern District of Illinois
- James Perry Platt (1851–1913), judge of the United States District Court for the District of Connecticut
- Thomas Collier Platt Jr. (1925–2017), judge of the United States District Court for the Eastern District of New York
- Thomas Joshua Platt (1788–1862), British judge who served as a Baron of the Exchequer
