= Ellen Bree Burns =

American judge (1923–2019)

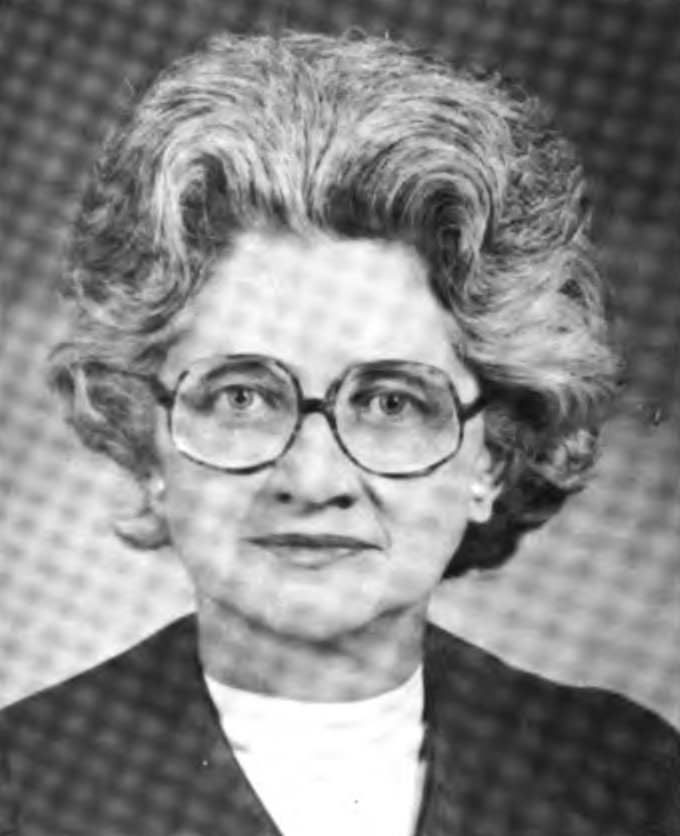

Senior Judge of the United States District Court for the District of Connecticut
- In office September 1, 1992 – June 3, 2019

Chief Judge of the United States District Court for the District of Connecticut
- In office 1988–1992
- Preceded by: T. F. Gilroy Daly
- Succeeded by: José A. Cabranes

Judge of the United States District Court for the District of Connecticut
- In office May 18, 1978 – September 1, 1992
- Appointed by: Jimmy Carter
- Preceded by: Mosher Joseph Blumenfeld
- Succeeded by: Alvin W. Thompson

Personal details
- Born: Ellen Lucille Bree; December 13, 1923 New Haven, Connecticut, U.S.
- Died: June 3, 2019 (aged 95) New Haven, Connecticut, U.S.
- Education: Albertus Magnus College (BA); Yale Law School (LLB)

Ellen Lucille Bree Burns (December 13, 1923 – June 3, 2019) was a United States district judge of the United States District Court for the District of Connecticut.

== Education and career ==
Burns was born in New Haven, Connecticut. She received a Bachelor of Arts degree from Albertus Magnus College in 1944. She received a Bachelor of Laws from Yale Law School in 1947. She was a special assistant to the Commission to Revise the Connecticut General Statutes from 1947 to 1948. She was an attorney for Legislative Legal Services of the State of Connecticut from 1949 to 1973. She was a judge of the Circuit Court of Connecticut from 1973 to 1974. She was a judge of the Court of Common Pleas of Connecticut from 1974 to 1976. She was a judge of the Superior Court of Connecticut from 1976 to 1978.

== Federal judicial service ==
Burns was nominated by President Jimmy Carter on February 15, 1978 to a seat on the United States District Court for the District of Connecticut vacated by Judge Mosher Joseph Blumenfeld. She was confirmed by the United States Senate on May 17, 1978, and received her commission on May 18, 1978, becoming the first female district judge in Connecticut. She served as Chief Judge from 1988 to 1992 and assumed senior status on September 1, 1992. She took inactive senior status on March 31, 2015, meaning that while she remained a federal judge, she no longer heard cases or participated in the business of the court. She died on June 3, 2019, aged 95.

== Sources ==
- Who's Who of International Women 2002

Legal offices
Preceded by Mosher Joseph Blumenfeld	Judge of the United States District Court for the District of Connecticut; 1978–1992	Succeeded by Alvin W. Thompson
Preceded by T. F. Gilroy Daly	Chief Judge of the United States District Court for the District of Connecticut; 1988–1992	Succeeded by José A. Cabranes
