= Robert P. Anderson =

American judge (1906–1978)

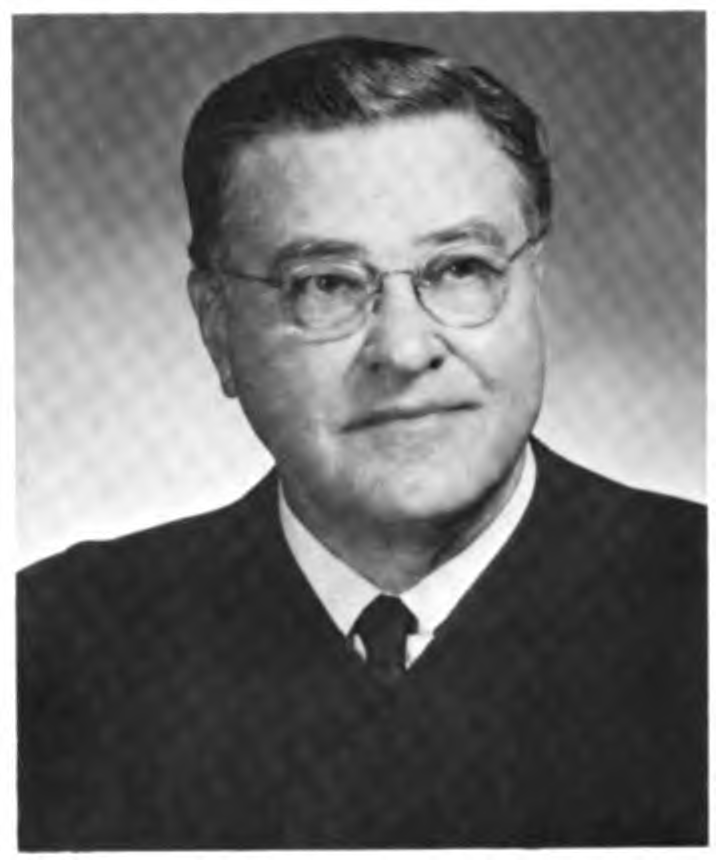

Senior Judge of the United States Court of Appeals for the Second Circuit
- In office May 1, 1971 – May 2, 1978

Judge of the United States Court of Appeals for the Second Circuit
- In office August 15, 1964 – May 1, 1971
- Appointed by: Lyndon B. Johnson
- Preceded by: Charles Edward Clark
- Succeeded by: William H. Timbers

Chief Judge of the United States District Court for the District of Connecticut
- In office 1960–1964
- Preceded by: J. Joseph Smith
- Succeeded by: William H. Timbers

Judge of the United States District Court for the District of Connecticut
- In office April 27, 1954 – August 20, 1964
- Appointed by: Dwight D. Eisenhower
- Preceded by: Carroll C. Hincks
- Succeeded by: Robert C. Zampano

Personal details
- Born: Robert Palmer Anderson; March 27, 1906 Groton, Connecticut, U.S.
- Died: May 2, 1978 (aged 72)
- Education: Yale University (BA, LLB)

Robert Palmer Anderson (March 27, 1906 – May 2, 1978) was a United States circuit judge of the United States Court of Appeals for the Second Circuit and previously was a United States district judge of the United States District Court for the District of Connecticut.

== Education and career ==
Born on March 27, 1906, in the Village of Noank, Town of Groton, Connecticut, Anderson received a Bachelor of Arts degree in 1927 from Yale University and a Bachelor of Laws in 1929 from Yale Law School. He entered private practice in New London, Connecticut from 1929 to 1953. He served as a United States Commissioner of the United States District Court for the District of Connecticut in 1936. He was the public defender for New London County, Connecticut from 1936 to 1947. He was a member of the Connecticut State Bar Examining Committee from 1936 to 1954. He served in the United States Coast Guard Reserve from 1942 to 1945. He was the state's attorney for New London County from 1947 to 1953. He was a member of the Connecticut Senate from 1947 to 1949. He served on the Judicial Council of the State of Connecticut from 1952 to 1953. He served as a judge of the Connecticut Superior Court from 1953 to 1954. He was a Captain in the United States Coast Guard Reserve from 1955 to 1957.

=== Federal judicial service ===
Anderson was nominated by President Dwight D. Eisenhower on April 6, 1954, to a seat on the United States District Court for the District of Connecticut vacated by Judge Carroll C. Hincks. He was confirmed by the United States Senate on April 23, 1954, and received his commission on April 27, 1954. He served as chief judge from 1960 to 1964. His service terminated on August 20, 1964, due to elevation to the Second Circuit.

Anderson presided over the bankruptcy proceedings of the New York, New Haven and Hartford Railroad from the case being filed in 1961 until his death; he continued to oversee the bankruptcy case even after his elevation to the Second Circuit. Judge Robert C. Zampano, Anderson's successor on the New Haven bankruptcy, praised his work: "For the next 17 years, Chief Judge Robert P. Anderson, later Circuit Judge, painstakingly presided over the reorganization proceedings with extraordinary skill, patience, common sense, and perspicacity. The voluminous record discloses thousands of pages of petitions, briefs, moving papers, exhibits, transcripts of hearings, and other documents. Judge Anderson's numerous decisions and orders speak eloquently of his wise and effective judicial performance over the years in salvage efforts of the New Haven, with the result that it now emerges from the ruins with prospects of being a remarkably healthy enterprise of substantial value." Anderson's last ruling in the case came May 1, 1978, the day before he died.

Anderson was nominated by President Lyndon B. Johnson on August 4, 1964, to a seat on the United States Court of Appeals for the Second Circuit vacated by Judge Charles Edward Clark. He was confirmed by the Senate on August 15, 1964, and received his commission on August 15, 1964. He assumed senior status on May 1, 1971. He served as a judge of the Temporary Emergency Court of Appeals from 1972 to 1978. His service terminated on May 2, 1978, due to his death.

== Sources ==
Legal offices
Preceded by Carroll C. Hincks	Judge of the United States District Court for the District of Connecticut; 1954–1964	Succeeded by Robert C. Zampano
Preceded by J. Joseph Smith	Chief Judge of the United States District Court for the District of Connecticut; 1960–1964	Succeeded by William H. Timbers
Preceded by Charles Edward Clark	Judge of the United States Court of Appeals for the Second Circuit; 1964–1971	Succeeded by William H. Timbers
