= Peter Collins Dorsey =

American judge (1931–2012)

Senior Judge of the United States District Court for the District of Connecticut
- In office January 2, 1998 – January 21, 2012

Chief Judge of the United States District Court for the District of Connecticut
- In office 1994–1998
- Preceded by: José A. Cabranes
- Succeeded by: Alfred V. Covello

Judge of the United States District Court for the District of Connecticut
- In office July 19, 1983 – January 2, 1998
- Appointed by: Ronald Reagan
- Preceded by: T. Emmet Clarie
- Succeeded by: Stefan R. Underhill

United States Attorney for the District of Connecticut
- In office 1974–1977
- President: Gerald Ford
- Preceded by: Harold J. Pickerstein
- Succeeded by: Richard Blumenthal

Personal details
- Born: Peter Collins Dorsey; March 24, 1931 New London, Connecticut, U.S.
- Died: January 21, 2012 (aged 80) New Haven, Connecticut, U.S.
- Education: Yale University (B.A.); Harvard Law School (LL.B.)

Peter Collins Dorsey (March 24, 1931 – January 20, 2012) was a United States district judge of the United States District Court for the District of Connecticut.

== Education ==
Born in New London, Connecticut, Dorsey received a Bachelor of Arts degree from Yale University in 1953, and a Bachelor of Laws from Harvard Law School in 1959. He was in the United States Naval Reserve from 1953 to 1956.

== Career ==
Dorsey was in private practice in New Haven, Connecticut from 1959 to 1974. He was the United States Attorney for the District of Connecticut from 1974 to 1977. He returned to private practice in New Haven from 1977 to 1983.

== Federal judicial service ==
Dorsey was nominated by President Ronald Reagan on June 7, 1983, to a seat vacated by Judge T. Emmet Clarie. He was confirmed by the United States Senate on July 18, 1983, and received commission on July 19, 1983. He served as Chief Judge from 1994 to 1998. He assumed senior status on January 2, 1998.

== Death ==
Dorsey died after a long illness on January 20, 2012, in New Haven, aged 80.

== Sources ==
Party political offices
Preceded by James F. Bingham	Republican nominee for Connecticut Attorney General; 1978	Succeeded by William H. Champlin III
Legal offices
Preceded by T. Emmet Clarie	Judge of the United States District Court for the District of Connecticut; 1983–1998	Succeeded by Stefan R. Underhill
Preceded by José A. Cabranes	Chief Judge of the United States District Court for the District of Connecticut; 1994–1998	Succeeded by Alfred V. Covello
