= Omar A. Williams =

American judge (born 1977)

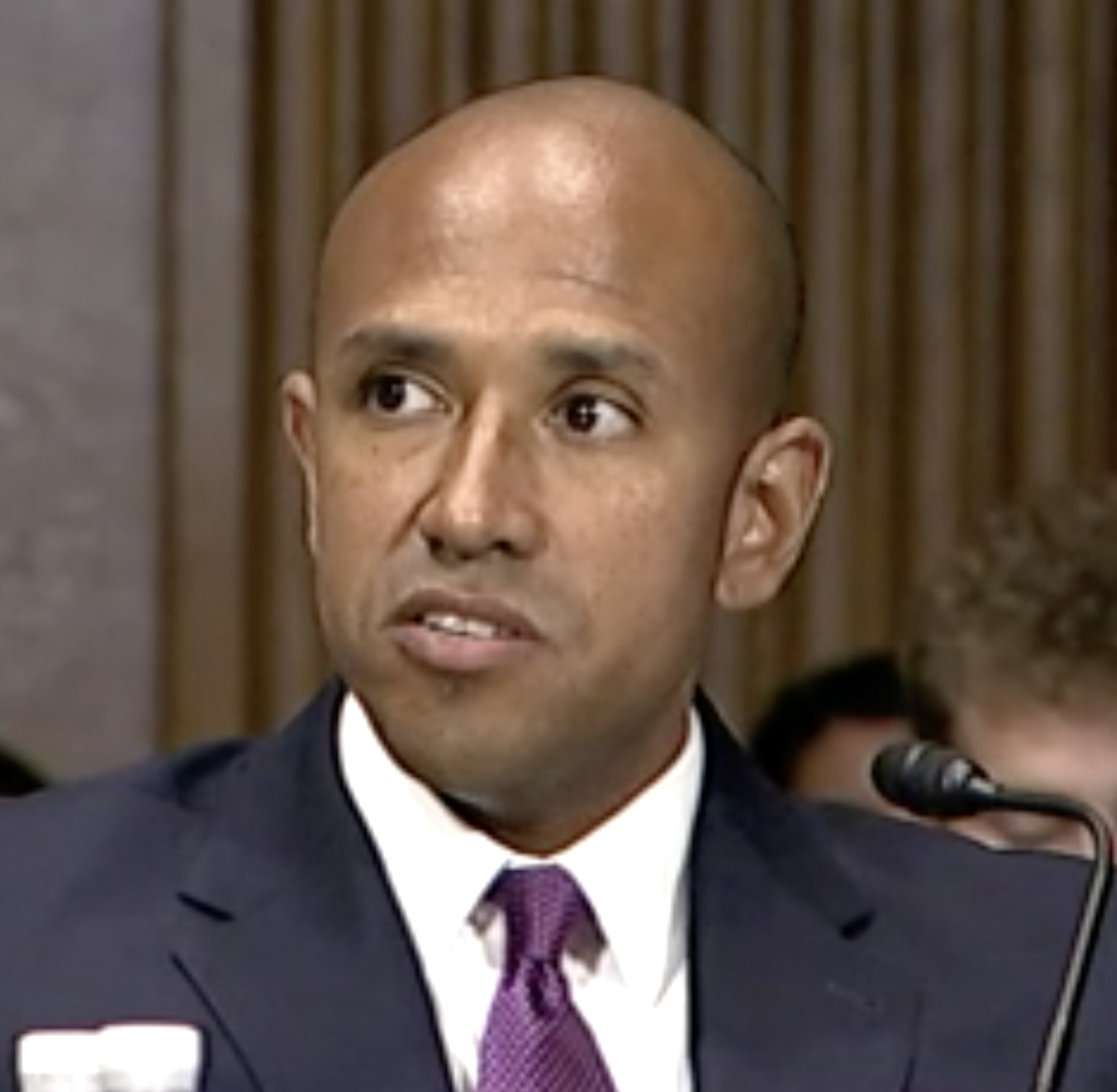

Judge of the United States District Court for the District of Connecticut
- Incumbent
- Assumed office November 12, 2021
- Appointed by: Joe Biden
- Preceded by: Alvin W. Thompson

Judge of the Connecticut Superior Court for the District of New London
- In office 2016 – November 12, 2021
- Appointed by: Dannel Malloy

Personal details
- Born: 1977 (age 48–49) Rochester, New York, U.S.
- Education: University of Connecticut (BA, JD)

Omar Antonio Williams (born 1977) is an American attorney serving as a United States district judge of the United States District Court for the District of Connecticut. He previously served as a judge of the New London District Superior Court from 2016 to 2021.

== Early life and education ==
Williams was born in Rochester, New York. He earned a Bachelor of Arts degree from the University of Connecticut in 1998 and a Juris Doctor from the University of Connecticut School of Law in 2002.

== Career ==
Williams began his career as an assistant public defender. In 2014, he was nominated by Governor Dannel Malloy to serve as a judge of the New London District Superior Court. On January 30, 2015, he was unanimously confirmed by both chambers of the General Assembly. Williams was involved with the New England Regional Judicial Opioid Initiative, the Sentence Review Division, and the Wiretap Panel. In 2020, Williams served on a task force that provided recommendations on reforming the way jurors are selected for trial in Connecticut.

=== Federal judicial service ===
On June 15, 2021, President Joe Biden nominated Williams to serve as a United States district judge for the United States District Court for the District of Connecticut to the seat vacated by Judge Alvin W. Thompson, who assumed senior status on August 31, 2018. On July 28, 2021, a hearing on his nomination was held before the Senate Judiciary Committee. On September 23, 2021, his nomination was reported out of committee by a 13–9 vote. On October 27, 2021, the United States Senate invoked cloture on his nomination by a 52–46 vote. On October 28, 2021, his nomination was confirmed by a 52–46 vote. He received his judicial commission on November 12, 2021. He was sworn in on November 22, 2021.

== See also ==
- List of African-American federal judges
- List of African-American jurists
- List of Hispanic and Latino American jurists

Legal offices
Preceded by Alvin W. Thompson	Judge of the United States District Court for the District of Connecticut; 2021–present	Incumbent
