= United States Court of Appeals for the Second Circuit =

United States federal appellate court

- (2d Cir.)

- Location: Thurgood Marshall U.S. Courthouse (New York City, New York)
- Appeals from: District of Connecticut; Eastern District of New York; Northern District of New York; Southern District of New York; Western District of New York; District of Vermont
- Established: June 16, 1891
- Judges: 13
- Circuit Justice: Sonia Sotomayor
- Chief Judge: Raymond Lohier
- ca2.uscourts.gov

The United States Court of Appeals for the Second Circuit (in case citations, 2d Cir.) is a federal court with appellate jurisdiction over the district courts in the following districts:

- District of Connecticut
- Eastern District of New York
- Northern District of New York
- Southern District of New York
- Western District of New York
- District of Vermont

== Jurisdiction ==
Its territory covers the states of Connecticut, New York, and Vermont, and it has appellate jurisdiction over the U.S. district courts in the following federal judicial districts and areas:

- District of Connecticut
- Eastern District of New York
- Northern District of New York
- Southern District of New York
- Western District of New York
- District of Vermont

The Second Circuit has its clerk's office and courtrooms at the Thurgood Marshall United States Courthouse at 40 Foley Square in Lower Manhattan.

Because the Second Circuit includes New York City (in the Southern and Eastern Districts of New York), it has long been one of the most prestigious and influential federal appellate courts in the United States, especially in matters of contract law, securities law, and antitrust law. In the 20th century, it came to be considered one of the two most prominent federal appellate courts, along with the U.S. Court of Appeals for the District of Columbia Circuit. Several notable judges have served on the Second Circuit, including three later named Associate Justices of the United States Supreme Court: John Marshall Harlan II, Thurgood Marshall, and Sonia Sotomayor. Judge Learned Hand served on the court from 1924 to 1961, as did his cousin, Augustus Noble Hand, from 1927 until 1953. Judge Henry Friendly served from 1959 to 1986.

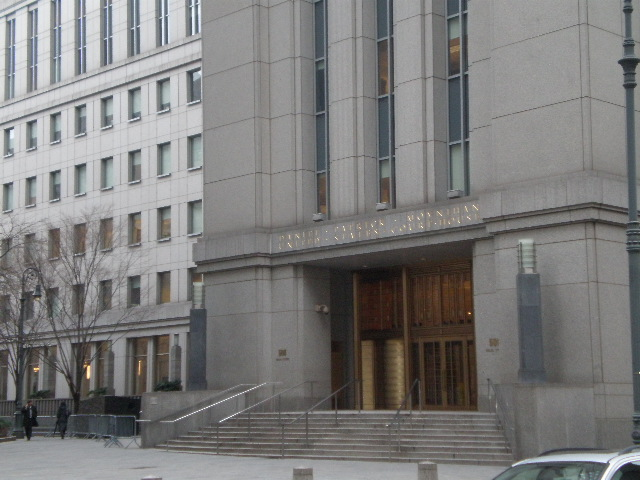
Daniel Patrick Moynihan United States Courthouse at 500 Pearl Street; the court's former temporary home

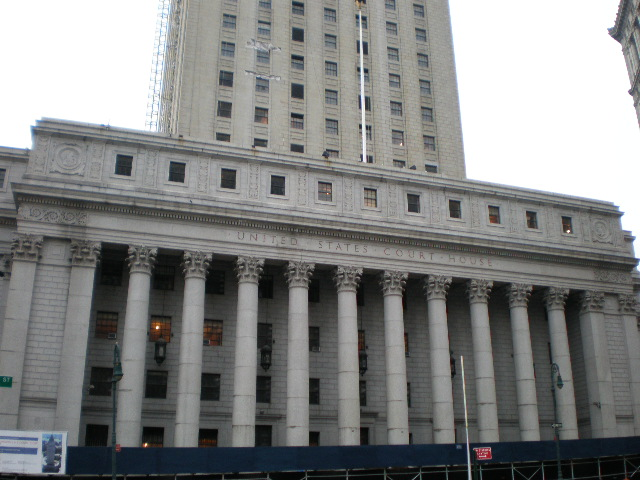
Thurgood Marshall United States Courthouse at 40 Foley Square

Procedurally, the Second Circuit is infamous for having one of the lowest en banc grant rates among the federal circuits. The court’s reticence to grant en banc rehearings is said to reflect the Second Circuit’s “longstanding tradition of general deference to panel adjudication—a tradition which holds whether or not the judges of the Court agree with the panel’s disposition of the matter before it.” Between 2011 and 2016, for example, the average federal circuit court granted 13 en banc rehearings; the Second Circuit granted two in the same period.

== Current composition of the court ==
As of July 24, 2026:

#	Title	Judge	Duty station	Born	Term of service			Appointed by
#	Title	Judge	Duty station	Born	Active	Chief	Senior	Appointed by
69	Chief Judge	Raymond Lohier	New York, NY	1965	2010–present	2026–present	—	Obama
72	Circuit Judge	Richard J. Sullivan	New York, NY	1964	2018–present	—	—	Trump
73	Circuit Judge	Joseph F. Bianco	Central Islip, NY	1966	2019–present	—	—	Trump
74	Circuit Judge	Michael H. Park	New York, NY	1976	2019–present	—	—	Trump
75	Circuit Judge	William J. Nardini	New Haven, CT	1969	2019–present	—	—	Trump
76	Circuit Judge	Steven Menashi	New York, NY	1979	2019–present	—	—	Trump
77	Circuit Judge	Eunice C. Lee	New York, NY	1970	2021–present	—	—	Biden
78	Circuit Judge	Beth Robinson	Burlington, VT	1965	2021–present	—	—	Biden
79	Circuit Judge	Myrna Pérez	New York, NY	1974	2021–present	—	—	Biden
80	Circuit Judge	Alison Nathan	New York, NY	1972	2022–present	—	—	Biden
81	Circuit Judge	Sarah A. L. Merriam	Bridgeport, CT	1971	2022–present	—	—	Biden
82	Circuit Judge	Maria Araújo Kahn	New Haven, CT	1964	2023–present	—	—	Biden
83	Circuit Judge	Matthew Schwartz	New York, NY	1978	2026–present	—	—	Trump
41	Senior Judge	Jon O. Newman	Hartford, CT	1932	1979–1997	1993–1997	1997–present	Carter
42	Senior Judge	Amalya Kearse	New York, NY	1937	1979–2002	—	2002–present	Carter
50	Senior Judge	John M. Walker Jr.	New Haven, CT	1940	1989–2006	2000–2006	2006–present	G.H.W. Bush
52	Senior Judge	Dennis Jacobs	New York, NY	1944	1992–2019	2006–2013	2019–present	G.H.W. Bush
53	Senior Judge	Pierre N. Leval	New York, NY	1936	1993–2002	—	2002–present	Clinton
54	Senior Judge	Guido Calabresi	New Haven, CT	1932	1994–2009	—	2009–present	Clinton
55	Senior Judge	José A. Cabranes	New Haven, CT	1940	1994–2023	—	2023–present	Clinton
59	Senior Judge	Robert D. Sack	New York, NY	1939	1998–2009	—	2009–present	Clinton
62	Senior Judge	Barrington Parker Jr.	New York, NY	1944	2001–2009	—	2009–present	G.W. Bush
63	Senior Judge	Reena Raggi	Brooklyn, NY	1951	2002–2018	—	2018–present	G.W. Bush
64	Senior Judge	Richard C. Wesley	Geneseo, NY	1949	2003–2016	—	2016–present	G.W. Bush
66	Senior Judge	Debra Ann Livingston	New York, NY	1959	2007–2026	2020–2026	2026–present	G.W. Bush
67	Senior Judge	Gerard E. Lynch	New York, NY	1951	2009–2016	—	2016–present	Obama
68	Senior Judge	Denny Chin	New York, NY	1954	2010–2021	—	2021–present	Obama
70	Senior Judge	Susan L. Carney	New Haven, CT	1951	2011–2022	—	2022–present	Obama

== List of former judges ==
#	Judge	State	Born–died	Active service	Chief Judge	Senior status	Appointed by	Reason for termination
1	William James Wallace	NY	1837–1917	1891–1907 (Note: Wallace was appointed as a circuit judge for the Second Circuit in 1882 by Chester A. Arthur. The Judiciary Act of 1891 reassigned his seat to what is now the U.S. Court of Appeals for the Second Circuit.)	—	—	Arthur / Operation of law	retirement
2	Emile Henry Lacombe	NY	1846–1924	1891–1916 (Note: Lacombe was appointed as a circuit judge for the Second Circuit in 1887 by Grover Cleveland. The Judiciary Act of 1891 reassigned his seat to what is now the U.S. Court of Appeals for the Second Circuit.)	—	—	Cleveland / Operation of law	retirement
3	Nathaniel Shipman	CT	1828–1906	1892–1902	—	—	B. Harrison	retirement
4	William Kneeland Townsend	CT	1849–1907	1902–1907	—	—	T. Roosevelt	death
5	Alfred Conkling Coxe Sr.	NY	1847–1923	1902–1917	—	—	T. Roosevelt	retirement
6	Henry Galbraith Ward	NY	1851–1933	1907–1921	—	1921–1924	T. Roosevelt	retirement
7	Walter Chadwick Noyes	CT	1865–1926	1907–1913	—	—	T. Roosevelt	resignation
8	Martin Augustine Knapp	NY	1843–1923	1910–1916	—	—	(Note: Knapp did not have a permanent seat on this court. Instead, he was appointed to the ill-fated United States Commerce Court in 1910 by William Howard Taft. Aside from their duties on the Commerce Court, the judges of the Commerce Court also acted as at-large appellate judges, able to be assigned by the Chief Justice of the United States to whichever circuit most needed help. Knapp was assigned to the Second Circuit upon his commission.)	reassigned
9	Henry Wade Rogers	CT	1853–1926	1913–1926	—	—	Wilson	death
10	Charles Merrill Hough	NY	1858–1927	1916–1927	—	—	Wilson	death
11	Martin Thomas Manton	NY	1880–1946	1918–1939	—	—	Wilson	resignation
12	Julius Marshuetz Mayer	NY	1865–1925	1921–1924	—	—	Harding	resignation
13	Learned Hand	NY	1872–1961	1924–1951	1948–1951	1951–1961	Coolidge	death
14	Thomas Walter Swan	CT	1877–1975	1926–1953	1951–1953	1953–1975	Coolidge	death
15	Augustus Noble Hand	NY	1869–1954	1927–1953	—	1953–1954	Coolidge	death
16	Harrie B. Chase	VT	1889–1969	1929–1954	1953–1954	1954–1969	Coolidge	death
17	Julian Mack	IL	1866–1943	1929–1940	—	1940–1943	(Note: Mack did not have a permanent seat on this court. Instead, he was appointed to the ill-fated United States Commerce Court in 1911 by William Howard Taft. Aside from their duties on the Commerce Court, the judges of the Commerce Court also acted as at-large appellate judges, able to be assigned by the Chief Justice of the United States to whichever circuit most needed help. Mack was assigned to the Seventh Circuit immediately prior to his joint assignment to the Second and Sixth Circuit. Reassigned solely to the Second Circuit in 1930.)	death
18	Charles Edward Clark	CT	1889–1963	1939–1963	1954–1959	—	F. Roosevelt	death
19	Robert P. Patterson	NY	1891–1952	1939–1940	—	—	F. Roosevelt	resignation
20	Jerome Frank	NY	1889–1957	1941–1957	—	—	F. Roosevelt	death
21	Harold Medina	NY	1888–1990	1951–1958	—	1958–1980	Truman	retirement
22	Carroll C. Hincks	CT	1889–1964	1953–1959	—	1959–1964	Eisenhower	death
23	John Marshall Harlan II	NY	1899–1971	1954–1955	—	—	Eisenhower	elevation
24	J. Edward Lumbard	NY	1901–1999	1955–1971	1959–1971	1971–1999	Eisenhower	death
25	Sterry R. Waterman	VT	1901–1984	1955–1970	—	1970–1984	Eisenhower	death
26	Leonard P. Moore	NY	1898–1982	1957–1971	—	1971–1982	Eisenhower	death
27	Henry Friendly	NY	1903–1986	1959–1974	1971–1973	1974–1986	Eisenhower	death
28	J. Joseph Smith	CT	1904–1980	1960–1971	—	1971–1980	Eisenhower	death
29	Irving Kaufman	NY	1910–1992	1961–1987	1973–1980	1987–1992	Kennedy	death
30	Paul R. Hays	NY	1903–1980	1961–1974	—	1974–1980	Kennedy	death
31	Thurgood Marshall	NY	1908–1993	1961–1965	—	—	Kennedy	resignation
32	Robert P. Anderson	CT	1906–1978	1964–1971	—	1971–1978	L. Johnson	death
33	Wilfred Feinberg	NY	1920–2014	1966–1991	1980–1988	1991–2014	L. Johnson	death
34	Walter R. Mansfield	NY	1911–1987	1971–1981	—	1981–1987	Nixon	death
35	William Hughes Mulligan	NY	1918–1996	1971–1981	—	—	Nixon	resignation
36	James L. Oakes	VT	1924–2007	1971–1992	1988–1992	1992–2007	Nixon	death
37	William H. Timbers	CT	1915–1994	1971–1981	—	1981–1994	Nixon	death
38	Murray Gurfein	NY	1907–1979	1974–1979	—	—	Ford (Note: Gurfein was nominated for a seat on the Second Circuit by President Nixon, but he was confirmed after Nixon's resignation and was appointed to the Second Circuit by (i.e., received his commission from) President Ford.)	death
39	Ellsworth Van Graafeiland	NY	1915–2004	1974–1985	—	1985–2004	Ford	death
40	Thomas Meskill	CT	1928–2007	1975–1993	1992–1993	1993–2007	Ford	death
43	Richard J. Cardamone	NY	1925–2015	1981–1993	—	1993–2015	Reagan	death
44	Lawrence W. Pierce	NY	1924–2020	1981–1990	—	1990–1995	Reagan	retirement
45	Ralph K. Winter Jr.	CT	1935–2020	1981–2000	1997–2000	2000–2020	Reagan	death
46	George C. Pratt	NY	1928–2025	1982–1993	—	1993–1995	Reagan	retirement
47	Roger Miner	NY	1934–2012	1985–1997	—	1997–2012	Reagan	death
48	Frank Altimari	NY	1928–1998	1985–1996	—	1996–1998	Reagan	death
49	J. Daniel Mahoney	NY	1931–1996	1986–1996	—	—	Reagan	death
51	Joseph M. McLaughlin	NY	1933–2013	1990–1998	—	1998–2013	G.H.W. Bush	death
56	Fred I. Parker	VT	1938–2003	1994–2003	—	—	Clinton	death
57	Rosemary S. Pooler	NY	1938–2023	1998–2022	—	2022–2023	Clinton	death
58	Chester J. Straub	NY	1937–2024	1998–2008	—	2008–2024	Clinton	death
60	Sonia Sotomayor	NY	1954–present	1998–2009	—	—	Clinton	elevation
61	Robert Katzmann	NY	1953–2021	1999–2021	2013–2020	2021	Clinton	death
65	Peter W. Hall	VT	1948–2021	2004–2021	—	2021	G.W. Bush	death
71	Christopher F. Droney	CT	1954–present	2011–2019	—	2019–2020	Obama	retirement

== Chief judges ==
Chief Judge
Hand	1948–1951
Swan	1951–1953
Chase	1953–1954
Clark	1954–1959
Lumbard	1959–1971
Friendly	1971–1973
Kaufman	1973–1980
Feinberg	1980–1988
Oakes	1988–1992
Meskill	1992–1993
Newman	1993–1997
Winter	1997–2000
Walker	2000–2006
Jacobs	2006–2013
Katzmann	2013–2020
Livingston	2020–2026
Lohier	2026–present

Chief judges have administrative responsibilities with respect to their circuits, and preside over any panel on which they serve, unless the circuit justice (the Supreme Court justice responsible for the circuit) is also on the panel. Unlike the Supreme Court, where one justice is specifically nominated to be chief, the office of chief judge rotates among the circuit judges.

To be chief, a judge must have been in active service on the court for at least one year, be under the age of 65, and have not previously served as chief judge. A vacancy is filled by the judge highest in seniority among the group of qualified judges, with seniority determined first by commission date, then by age. The chief judge serves for a term of seven years, or until age 70, whichever occurs first. If no judge qualifies to be chief, the youngest judge over the age of 65 who has served on the court for at least one year shall act as chief until another judge qualifies. If no judge has served on the court for more than a year, the most senior judge shall act as chief. Judges can forfeit or resign their chief judgeship or acting chief judgeship while retaining their active status as a circuit judge.

When the office was created in 1948, the chief judge was the longest-serving judge who had not elected to retire, on what has since 1958 been known as senior status, or declined to serve as chief judge. After August 6, 1959, judges could not become or remain chief after turning 70 years old. The current rules have been in operation since October 1, 1982.

== Succession of seats ==
The court has thirteen seats for active judges, numbered in the order in which they were initially filled. Judges who assume senior status enter a kind of retirement in which they remain on the bench but vacate their seats, thus allowing the U.S. President to appoint new judges to fill their seats.

Seat 1
Established on December 6, 1869 by the Judiciary Act of 1869 as a circuit judgeship for the Second Circuit
Reassigned on June 16, 1891 to the newly formed U.S. Circuit Court of Appeals for the Second Circuit by the Judiciary Act of 1891
Wallace	NY	1891–1907
Ward	NY	1907–1921
Mayer	NY	1921–1924
L. Hand	NY	1924–1951
Medina	NY	1951–1958
Friendly	NY	1959–1974
Van Graafeiland	NY	1974–1985
Altimari	NY	1985–1996
Pooler	NY	1998–2022
Nathan	NY	2022–present

Seat 2
Established on March 3, 1887 by 24 Stat. 492 as a circuit judgeship for the Second Circuit
Reassigned on June 16, 1891 to the newly formed U.S. Circuit Court of Appeals for the Second Circuit by the Judiciary Act of 1891
Lacombe	NY	1891–1916
Hough	NY	1916–1927
A. Hand	NY	1927–1953
Harlan II	NY	1954–1955
Lumbard	NY	1955–1971
Mulligan	NY	1971–1981
Cardamone	NY	1981–1993
Cabranes	CT	1994–2023
Kahn	CT	2023–present

Seat 3
Established on June 16, 1891 by the Judiciary Act of 1891
Shipman	CT	1892–1902
Townsend	CT	1902–1907
Noyes	CT	1907–1913
Rogers	CT	1913–1926
Swan	CT	1926–1953
Hincks	CT	1953–1959
Smith	CT	1960–1971
Meskill	CT	1975–1993
Calabresi	CT	1994–2009
Droney	CT	2011–2019
Nardini	CT	2019–present

Seat 4
Established on April 17, 1902 by 32 Stat. 106
Coxe	NY	1902–1917
Manton	NY	1918–1939
Patterson	NY	1939–1940
Frank	NY	1941–1957
Moore	NY	1958–1971
Mansfield	NY	1971–1981
Winter	CT	1981–2000
B. Parker	NY	2001–2009
Carney	CT	2011–2022
Merriam	CT	2022–present

Seat 5
Established on January 17, 1929 by 45 Stat. 1081
Chase	VT	1929–1954
Waterman	VT	1955–1970
Oakes	VT	1971–1992
F. Parker	VT	1994–2003
Hall	VT	2004–2021
Robinson	VT	2021–present

Seat 6
Established on May 31, 1938 by 52 Stat. 584
Clark	CT	1939–1963
Anderson	CT	1964–1971
Timbers	CT	1971–1981
Pratt	NY	1982–1993
Leval	NY	1993–2002
Wesley	NY	2003–2016
Sullivan	NY	2018–present

Seat 7
Established on May 19, 1961 by 75 Stat. 80
Kaufman	NY	1961–1987
Walker	NY	1989–2006
Livingston	NY	2007–2026
Schwartz	NY	2026–present

Seat 8
Established on May 19, 1961 by 75 Stat. 80
Hays	NY	1961–1974
Gurfein	NY	1974–1979
Pierce	NY	1981–1990
McLaughlin	NY	1990–1998
Straub	NY	1998–2008
Lynch	NY	2009–2016
Park	NY	2019–present

Seat 9
Established on May 19, 1961 by 75 Stat. 80
Marshall	NY	1961–1965
Feinberg	NY	1966–1991
Jacobs	NY	1992–2019
Menashi	NY	2019–present

Seat 10
Established on October 20, 1978 by 92 Stat. 1629
Newman	CT	1979–1997
Katzmann	NY	1999–2021
Lee	NY	2021–present

Seat 11
Established on October 20, 1978 by 92 Stat. 1629
Kearse	NY	1979–2002
Raggi	NY	2002–2018
Bianco	NY	2019–present

Seat 12
Established on July 10, 1984 by 98 Stat. 333
Miner	NY	1985–1997
Sack	NY	1998–2009
Chin	NY	2010–2021
Pérez	NY	2021–present

Seat 13
Established on July 10, 1984 by 98 Stat. 333
Mahoney	NY	1986–1996
Sotomayor	NY	1998–2009
Lohier	NY	2010–present

== See also ==
- Judicial appointment history for United States federal courts#Second Circuit
- List of current United States circuit judges
