= List of United States federal courthouses in Connecticut =

Following is a list of current and former courthouses of the United States federal court system located in Connecticut. Each entry indicates the name of the building along with an image, if available, its location and the jurisdiction it covers, the dates during which it was used for each such jurisdiction, and, if applicable the person for whom it was named, and the date of renaming. Dates of use will not necessarily correspond with the dates of construction or demolition of a building, as pre-existing structures may be adapted for court use, and former court buildings may later be put to other uses. Also, the official name of the building may be changed at some point after its use as a federal court building has been initiated.

== Courthouses ==
Courthouse	City	Image	Street address	Jurisdiction	First used	Last used	Notes
Brien McMahon Federal Building	Bridgeport		915 Lafayette Boulevard	D. Conn.	?	present	Named after U.S. Sen. Brien McMahon.
U.S. Post Office & Customhouse	Hartford		65 State Street	D. Conn.	1882	1933	Razed in 1934.
William R. Cotter Federal Building	Hartford		135 High Street	D. Conn.	1933	1963	Now used for other federal government offices. Named after U.S. Rep. William R. Cotter in 1982.
Abraham A. Ribicoff Federal Building	Hartford		450 Main Street	D. Conn.	1963	present	Named after Conn. Gov. and U.S. Rep. Abraham A. Ribicoff in 1980.
Richard C. Lee U.S. Courthouse	New Haven		141 Church Street	D. Conn.	1919	present	Named after New Haven mayor Richard C. Lee in 1998.
U.S. Post Office & Customhouse	New Haven		Church & Gregson Streets	D.Conn.	1860	1919	Razed in 1952.
John S. Monagan Federal Building	Waterbury		14 Cottage Place	D. Conn.	?	present	

== Key ==
^{†}	Listed on the National Register of Historic Places (NRHP)
^{††}	NRHP-listed and also designated as a National Historic Landmark
