= Mosher Joseph Blumenfeld =

American judge (1904–1988)

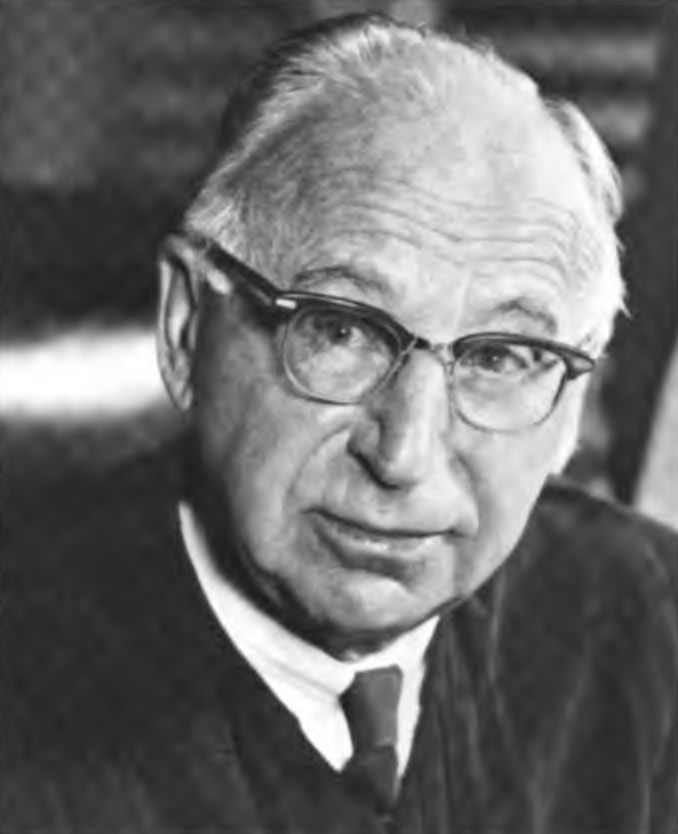

Senior Judge of the United States District Court for the District of Connecticut
- In office January 20, 1977 – November 5, 1988

Chief Judge of the United States District Court for the District of Connecticut
- In office 1971–1974
- Preceded by: William H. Timbers
- Succeeded by: T. Emmet Clarie

Judge of the United States District Court for the District of Connecticut
- In office August 15, 1961 – January 20, 1977
- Appointed by: John F. Kennedy
- Preceded by: Seat established by 75 Stat. 80
- Succeeded by: Ellen Bree Burns

Personal details
- Born: March 23, 1904 Saint Paul, Minnesota, U.S.
- Died: November 5, 1988 (aged 84) Hartford, Connecticut, U.S.
- Education: University of Minnesota (B.A.); Harvard Law School (LL.B.)

Mosher Joseph Blumenfeld (March 23, 1904 – November 5, 1988) was a United States district judge of the United States District Court for the District of Connecticut.

== Education and career ==
Born on March 23, 1904, in Saint Paul, Minnesota, Blumenfeld received at Bachelor of Arts degree in 1925 from the University of Minnesota and a Bachelor of Laws in 1928 from Harvard Law School. He worked in private practice in Hartford, Connecticut, from 1928 to 1961. He was a special assistant to the United States Attorney for the District of Connecticut from 1942 to 1946.

== Federal judicial service ==
Blumenfeld was nominated by President John F. Kennedy on August 7, 1961, to the United States District Court for the District of Connecticut to a new seat authorized by 75 Stat. 80. He was confirmed by the United States Senate on August 15, 1961, and received his commission on August 15, 1961. He served as chief judge from 1971 to 1974. He assumed senior status on January 20, 1977. His service terminated on November 5, 1988, when he died in Hartford.

== See also ==
- List of Jewish American jurists

== Sources ==
Legal offices
Preceded by Seat established by 75 Stat. 80	Judge of the United States District Court for the District of Connecticut; 1961–1977	Succeeded by Ellen Bree Burns
Preceded by William H. Timbers	Chief Judge of the United States District Court for the District of Connecticut; 1971–1974	Succeeded by T. Emmet Clarie
