= Edwin Stark Thomas =

American judge (1872–1952)

Judge of the United States District Court for the District of Connecticut
- In office November 17, 1913 – April 12, 1939
- Appointed by: Woodrow Wilson
- Preceded by: James Perry Platt
- Succeeded by: J. Joseph Smith

Member of the Connecticut House of Representatives
- In office 1899

Personal details
- Born: Edwin Stark Thomas; November 11, 1872 Woodstock, Illinois, U.S.
- Died: January 21, 1952 (aged 79) Columbia, Connecticut, U.S.
- Education: Yale Law School (LL.B.)

Edwin Stark Thomas (November 11, 1872 – January 21, 1952) was a United States district judge of the United States District Court for the District of Connecticut.

== Education and career ==
Born on November 11, 1872, in Woodstock, Illinois, Thomas received a Bachelor of Laws in 1895 from Yale Law School. He entered private practice in New Haven, Connecticut from 1895 to 1912. He was a member of the Connecticut House of Representatives in 1899. He was Executive Secretary to Governor of Connecticut Simeon E. Baldwin from 1911 to 1913.

== Federal judicial service ==
Thomas was nominated by President Woodrow Wilson on October 16, 1913, to a seat on the United States District Court for the District of Connecticut vacated by Judge James Perry Platt. He was confirmed by the United States Senate on November 17, 1913, and received his commission the same day. His service terminated on April 12, 1939, due to his resignation.

=== Circumstances of his resignation ===
Thomas resigned during an investigation of his financial affairs by a federal grand jury, prompted by his connections to the bribery case of another federal judge, Martin Thomas Manton. It seemed likely that Thomas may have been offered a $10,000 bribe for a favorable ruling. He claimed to be suffering from nervous disorders which friends attributed to the circumstances under which he had been questioned by a federal grand jury. He resigned from the hospital.

== Death ==
Thomas died on January 21, 1952, in Columbia, Connecticut.

== Sources ==
- "Thomas, Edwin Stark - Federal Judicial Center". www.fjc.gov.

Legal offices
Preceded by James Perry Platt	Judge of the United States District Court for the District of Connecticut; 1913–1939	Succeeded by J. Joseph Smith
