= Susan L. Carney =

American judge (born 1951)

Susan Carney
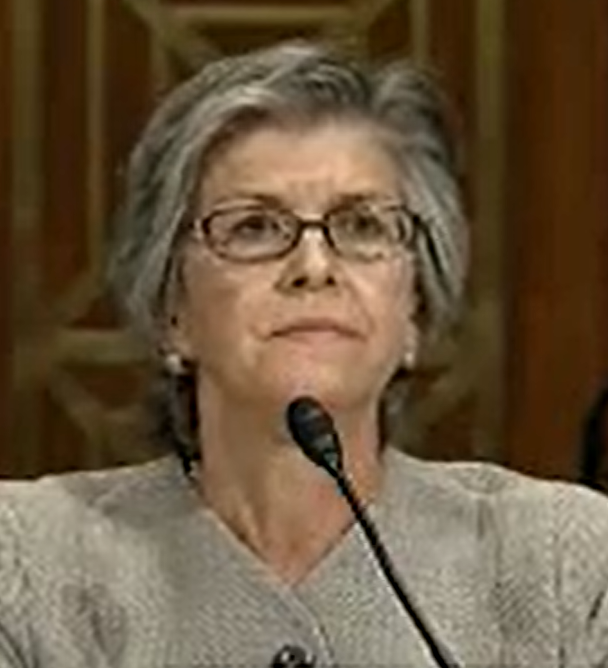

Senior Judge of the United States Court of Appeals for the Second Circuit
- Incumbent
- Assumed office September 27, 2022

Judge of the United States Court of Appeals for the Second Circuit
- In office May 17, 2011 – September 27, 2022
- Appointed by: Barack Obama
- Preceded by: Barrington D. Parker Jr.
- Succeeded by: Sarah A. L. Merriam

Personal details
- Born: Susan Laura Carney; September 16, 1951 (age 74) Waltham, Massachusetts, U.S.
- Spouse: Lincoln Caplan (m. 1979)
- Education: Harvard University (BA, JD)

Susan Laura Carney (born September 16, 1951) is an American lawyer who serves as a senior United States circuit judge of the United States Court of Appeals for the Second Circuit.

== Early life and education ==
She was born in Waltham, Massachusetts to Cleo Olgas and John R. Carney Jr. Her father was a partner at the Boston law firm Young & Carney. She earned a Bachelor of Arts degree from Radcliffe College, cum laude, in 1973 in Russian History and Literature, and a Juris Doctor from Harvard Law School, magna cum laude, in 1977. After graduating from law school, Carney worked as a law clerk for Judge Levin H. Campbell of the United States Court of Appeals for the First Circuit.

== Professional career ==
From 1979 until 1986, Carney was an attorney at Rogovin, Huge & Lenzner in Washington, D.C., first as an associate and later as a partner. She worked on litigation in federal courts and provided business counsel, primarily for large nonprofit organizations. In 1986, Carney joined two other Rogovin partners to form the Washington, D.C. office of the Los Angeles-based firm of Tuttle & Taylor. She was subsequently Of Counsel to the D.C. labor law firm of Bredhoff & Kaiser, where she engaged in an appellate practice. From 1996 to 1998, Carney served as Associate General Counsel of the Peace Corps.

Carney moved from Washington to Connecticut in 1998, and at that point joined Yale University in the school's general counsel's office. In 2001, she became Yale's Deputy General Counsel. In this capacity, she was the second-ranking legal officer of a leading educational and research institution with an annual budget of more than $2 billion. Her work for Yale addressed many areas covered by federal law, including scientific research, intellectual property, and health care. Her practice also focused on Yale's international affiliations and transactions. She served as Yale's Acting General Counsel from July to December 2008.

Carney is a member of the Connecticut, District of Columbia, and Massachusetts bars and served on the board of directors of the National Association of college & University Attorneys.

== Federal judicial service ==
On May 20, 2010, President Barack Obama nominated Carney to the seat on the United States Court of Appeals for the Second Circuit that was vacated by Judge Barrington D. Parker Jr., who assumed senior status in October 2009. In announcing the nomination, President Obama stated, “At every step of her career, Susan Carney has performed with excellence and unwavering integrity. I am confident she will serve the people of Connecticut with distinction on the Circuit Court bench." On May 17, 2011, the United States Senate confirmed Carney's nomination by a 71–28 vote. She received her commission on May 17, 2011. She entered duty as a Circuit Judge on June 21, 2011.

On November 5, 2021, Carney announced that she would assume senior status upon the confirmation of her successor. She assumed senior status on September 27, 2022.

In May 2024, the Supreme Court ruled unanimously in the First Amendment case of National Rifle Association of America v. Vullo, favoring the NRA's case against New York insurance regulator Maria Vullo. The court overturned the decision of Carney and her two fellow Second Circuit jurists, Denny Chin and Rosemary Pooler.

== Personal life ==
Carney married journalist Lincoln W. Caplan, also a Harvard Law School graduate, in February 1979 in Waltham, Massachusetts. They have a daughter, Molly Caplan.

Carney has five brothers. Her mother, Cleo Carney, and father, John R. Carney, both served in the United States Navy.

Legal offices
Preceded by Barrington D. Parker Jr.	Judge of the United States Court of Appeals for the Second Circuit; 2011–2022	Succeeded by Sarah A. L. Merriam
