= Michael J. Daly =

Irish-American infantry officer (1924–2008)

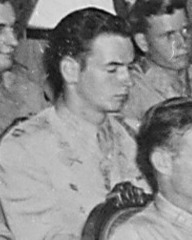
- Daly in 1945
- Born: September 15, 1924; New York City, U.S.
- Died: July 25, 2008 (aged 83); Fairfield, Connecticut, U.S.
- Burial place: Oak Lawn Cemetery; Fairfield, Connecticut, U.S.
- Relatives: Thomas Francis Gilroy (great-grandfather); T. F. Gilroy Daly (brother)
- Military career
- Allegiance: United States
- Branch: United States Army
- Service years: 1942–1946
- Rank: Captain
- Units: 1st Battalion, 15th Infantry Regiment
- Conflicts: World War II; European theatre; Normandy landings; Omaha Beach
- Awards: Medal of Honor; Silver Star (3); Bronze Star Medal; Purple Heart (2)

Michael Joseph Daly (September 15, 1924 – July 25, 2008) was an Irish-American United States Army infantry officer who received the United States military's highest decoration for valor—the Medal of Honor—for his actions in World War II. He received the medal for single-handedly eliminating 15 German soldiers including a German patrol, and destroying three machine-gun nests.

Daly resigned from the United States Military Academy after one year to fight in World War II and was sent to Europe, participating in the D-Day landings at Omaha Beach. After the D-Day invasion, he fought on to Germany where he was wounded. He received a battlefield commission to second lieutenant, returned to combat, and was awarded the Medal of Honor.

After being presented the Medal of Honor in a ceremony at the White House by President Harry S. Truman, Daly went back to his hometown, started a family, and became a businessman. He died of cancer at his home in 2008, at the age of 83.

== Early life ==
Daly was born September 15, 1924, in New York City, but resided his entire life in Fairfield, Connecticut, except for one year he and his wife lived in County Wicklow, Ireland. His father, Colonel Paul Daly, was a World War I and World War II veteran who was a recipient of the Distinguished Service Cross and was also nominated for the Medal of Honor twice, but did not receive it. His great-grandfather Thomas F. Gilroy was an Irish immigrant who was the mayor of New York City in the 1890s. Michael Daly had three brothers, Gilroy, Daniel and Dermot and three sisters, Madeleine Potter, Bevin Patterson and Alison Gerard.

== Military service ==
Daly graduated from Georgetown Preparatory School in 1941 and joined the United States Army from Fairfield's Southport neighborhood in 1942. He attended the United States Military Academy in West Point, New York, where he was a classmate of George Patton IV. While he was at the academy he was, by his own admission, a mediocre student. After having severe disciplinary problems and continuously being placed on special confinement and walking off punishment tours he resigned his appointment after only one year to fight in World War II. Sent to Europe as an eighteen-year-old infantry private, he trained in England and took part in the D-Day landings at Omaha Beach with the 1st Infantry Division. His father also volunteered to serve in the war and was sent first to Guadalcanal, then as a regimental commander to France.

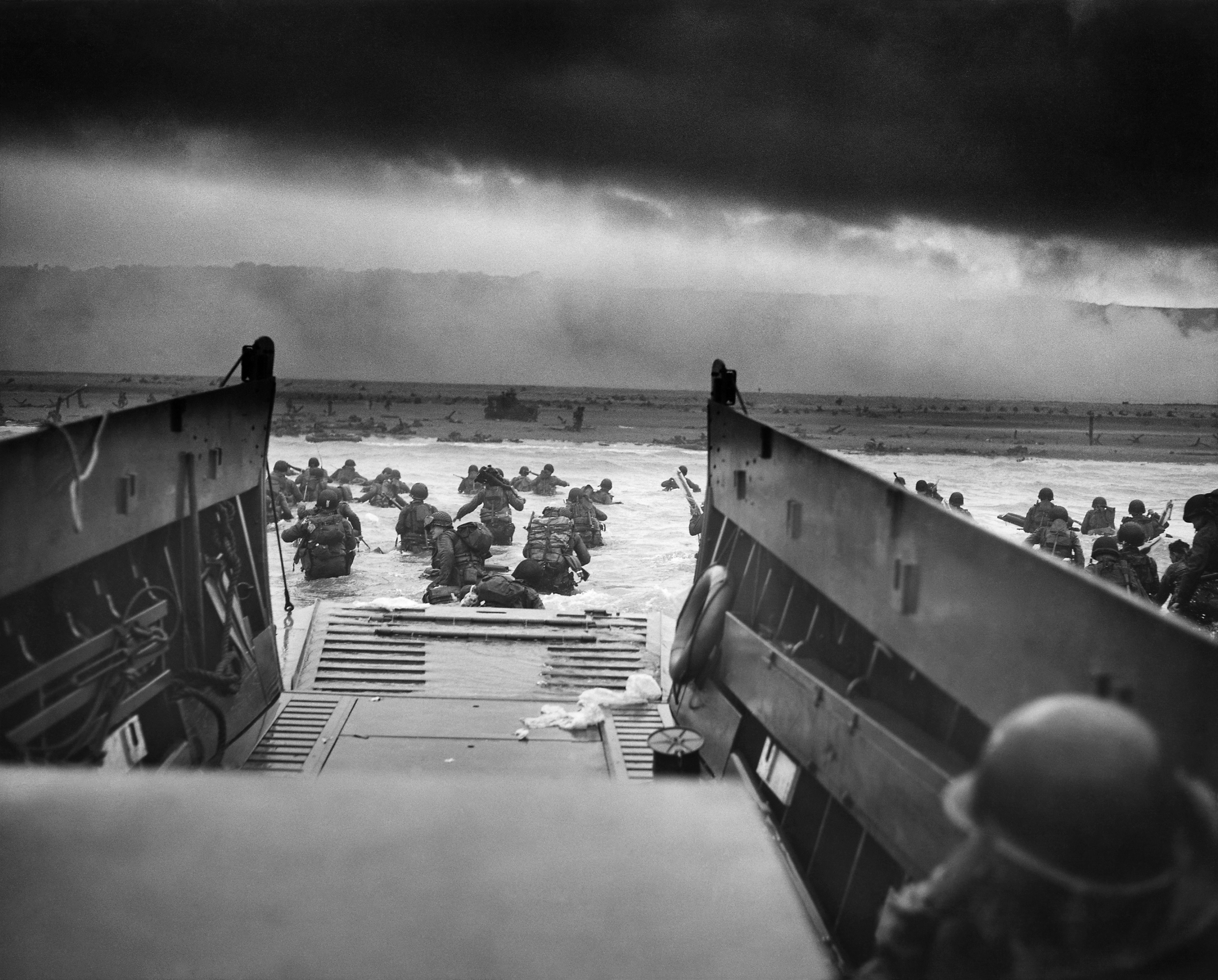
Into the Jaws of Death: Troops from the First Division landing on Omaha Beach – photograph by Robert F. Sargent

Daly participated in the drive through France and was wounded in Aachen, Germany, and was sent to England to recover. After he recovered, he was reassigned to the 3rd Infantry Division and was given a battlefield commission to second lieutenant. By April 18, 1945, he was a first lieutenant in command of Company A, 15th Infantry Regiment, 3rd Infantry Division, 7th Army. On that day, he led his company in their advance through Nuremberg, Germany, and single-handedly engaged German forces several times. As his unit passed a city square, a German machine gun opened fire, causing several casualties. Daly rushed the position and killed the three gunners. Advancing ahead of his men, he came across a German patrol preparing to use rocket launchers to ambush American tanks. He again attacked alone and, despite being outnumbered and outgunned, killed all six patrol members. When a machine gun opened fire at close range, he picked up a dead man's rifle and killed the two-man German crew.

On April 19, 1945, Daly was shot through the head; a bullet entered at his ear and exited from the opposite cheek. He was sent to England and eventually the United States to recuperate. At about the same time, his father, who had been wounded in France, was also being evacuated to the United States.

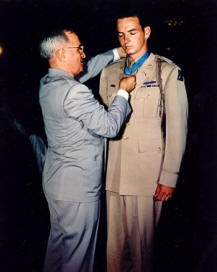
Truman presenting Captain Daly with the Medal of Honor in 1945

Daly was subsequently promoted to captain and, on August 23, 1945, was awarded the Medal of Honor. Although still recovering from his wounds, for which he would continue to receive treatment until mid-1946, he attended a ceremony at the White House where President Harry S. Truman formally presented him with the medal. Daly is the second known graduate of Georgetown Prep to receive the Medal of Honor.

In addition to the Medal of Honor, Daly received three Silver Stars, a Bronze Star with "V" device, and two Purple Hearts. Commenting on his Medal of Honor citation in a speech at Fairfield High School sometime later, Daly said, "We all lose our courage at times. It is something we pray for in the morning, that God will give us the strength and courage to do what is right."

== Later life ==
Daly returned to Fairfield after he was discharged from the army and began a business career. He worked very briefly as a salesman for an oil company before starting his own manufacturer's representative business, Michael Daly & Associates, in the Southport neighborhood. He was also involved in the operations of St. Vincent's Medical Center in Bridgeport, serving on the hospital's board of directors for more than thirty years, as well as being a trustee and helping to obtain financial support for the hospital. A Democrat, he also supported the political careers of his brother, Judge T. F. Gilroy Daly, and friend, town politician John J. Sullivan, but dismissed suggestions to run for office himself.

Daly married Margaret Noble Wallace (great-granddaughter of Lew Wallace) in the 1950s and together they had two children, Deirdre M. Daly and Michael. His brother, T. F. Gilroy Daly, who died in 1996, was a federal judge in Connecticut who had gained prominence as a lawyer for helping win the exoneration of Peter Reilly, who had been convicted of killing his mother in a highly publicized case of the 1970s.

Daly died of pancreatic cancer at his Fairfield home on July 25, 2008. His funeral was held on July 29, 2008, at St. Pius X Church in Fairfield and he was buried at Oak Lawn Cemetery with full military honors. The 10th Mountain Division of Fort Drum and the United States Military Academy of West Point performed the ceremony. The ceremony included a three-round volley and West Point's bugle sounding "Taps" as preludes to a military helicopter flying over the cemetery.

== Awards and decorations ==
Daly's exact list of authorized military awards as recorded by the United States Army are unknown due to the National Personnel Records Center fire of 1973, His service records are one of the approximately 16–18 million individuals whose military service records were destroyed in the blaze. As a consequence, what follows below is an incomplete list of his military awards either confirmed or thought to have been awarded to Daly:

Combat Infantryman Badge
Medal of Honor
Silver Star with 2 bronze oak leaf clusters	Bronze Star with "V" device	Purple Heart with bronze oak leaf cluster
American Campaign Medal	European–African–Middle Eastern Campaign Medal with Arrowhead device and three bronze campaign stars	World War II Victory Medal

Army Presidential Unit Citation

== Medal of Honor ==
Captain Daly's official Medal of Honor citation reads:

Early in the morning of 18 April 1945, he led his company through the shell-battered, sniper-infested wreckage of Nuremberg, Germany. When blistering machinegun fire caught his unit in an exposed position, he ordered his men to take cover, dashed forward alone, and, as bullets whined about him, shot the 3-man guncrew with his carbine. Continuing the advance at the head of his company, he located an enemy patrol armed with rocket launchers which threatened friendly armor. He again went forward alone, secured a vantage point and opened fire on the Germans. Immediately he became the target for concentrated machine pistol and rocket fire, which blasted the rubble about him. Calmly, he continued to shoot at the patrol until he had killed all 6 enemy infantrymen. Continuing boldly far in front of his company, he entered a park, where as his men advanced, a German machinegun opened up on them without warning. With his carbine, he killed the gunner; and then, from a completely exposed position, he directed machinegun fire on the remainder of the crew until all were dead. In a final duel, he wiped out a third machinegun emplacement with rifle fire at a range of 10 yards. By fearlessly engaging in 4 single-handed fire fights with a desperate, powerfully armed enemy, Lt. DALY, voluntarily taking all major risks himself and protecting his men at every opportunity, killed 15 Germans, silenced 3 enemy machineguns and wiped out an entire enemy patrol. His heroism during the lone bitter struggle with fanatical enemy forces was an inspiration to the valiant Americans who took Nuremberg.

== Other honors and namings ==
- St. Vincent's Medical Center, Bridgeport, Connecticut, plans to name its new emergency wing in his honor.
- Connecticut State Representative Carl Dickman proposed legislation to name a section of Interstate Route 95 from Bridgeport to Westport north bound and south bound for Captain Daly. When proposing this bill Representative Dickman said:

This naming of the highway would honor a well-respected Fairfield resident for his extraordinary service to the people of the United States. I encourage the legislature to adopt this proposal.

The legislation, House Bill No. 5711 reads as follows:

AN ACT RENAMING A SEGMENT OF INTERSTATE ROUTE 95 FROM BRIDGEPORT TO WESTPORT.

Be it enacted by the Senate and House of Representatives in General Assembly convened:

That the segment of Interstate Route 95 from Bridgeport to Westport north bound and south bound be renamed the "Captain Michael J. Daly Highway".

- In 2007, Daly along with nine other Connecticut veterans were inducted into the Connecticut Veterans Hall of Fame and at the time he was one of only two living inductees who had received the Medal of Honor.

Mr. Daly is a U.S. Army veteran of World War II who received the Congressional Medal of Honor for extreme heroism while leading his infantry company through the shell-battered, sniper-infested wreckage of Nuremberg, Germany, in April 1945. Following his distinctive military service, he became very involved in veterans' and community affairs, serving on the Board of Directors of St. Vincent's Hospital and founding the hospital's Daly Foundation. He has also provided decades of volunteer service to handicapped children, the Town of Fairfield and served as a member of the Connecticut Judicial Review Council.

== See also ==
- List of Medal of Honor recipients for World War II
