= David X. Sullivan =

American lawyer

David Xavier Sullivan
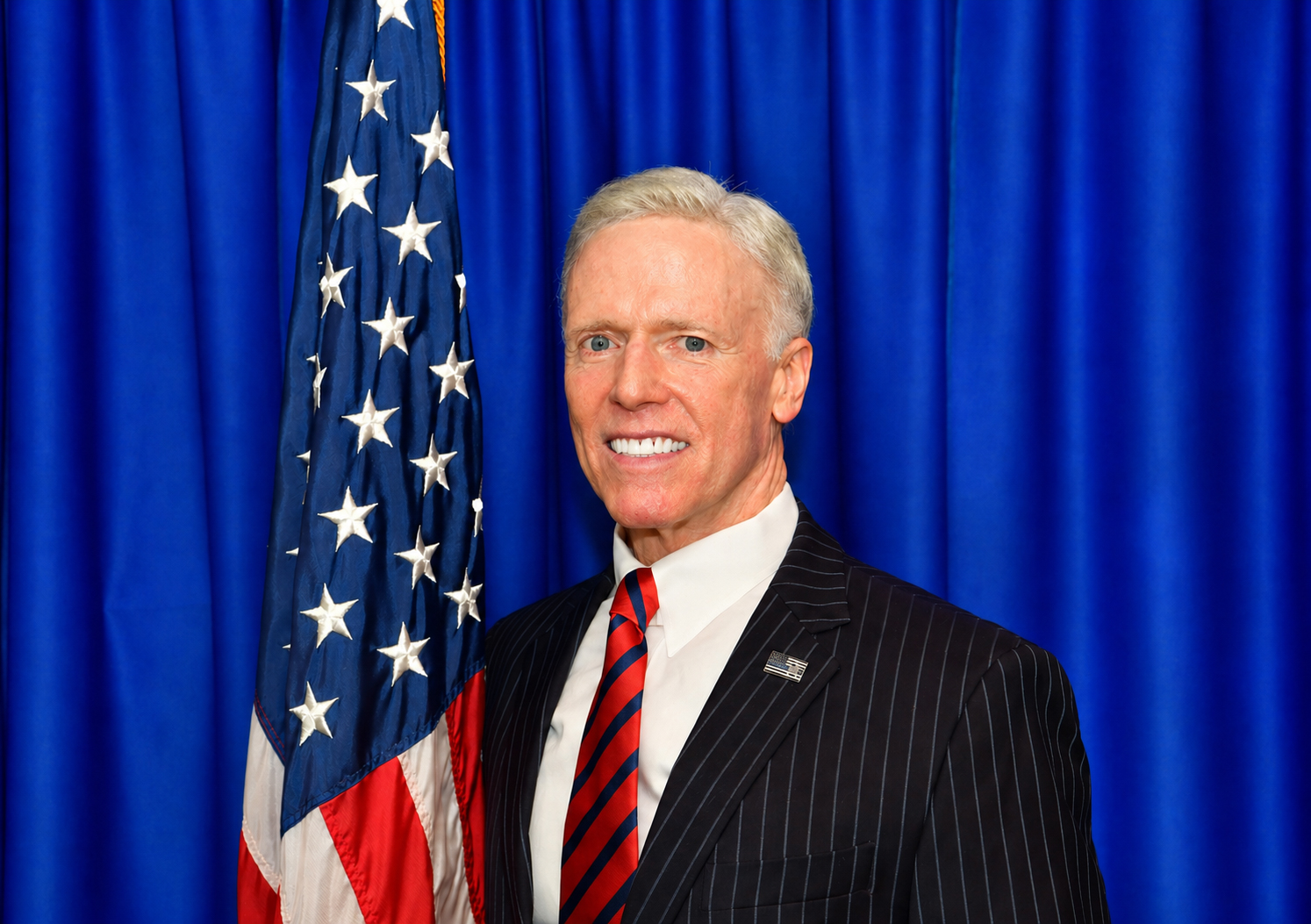

United States Attorney for the United States District Court for the District of Connecticut
- Incumbent
- Assumed office May 12, 2025; Interim: May 12, 2025 – September 8, 2025
- President: Donald Trump
- Preceded by: Marc H. Silverman (Acting)

Personal details
- Education: Catholic University of America (BA); Columbus School of Law (JD); Quinnipiac University School of Law (LL.M.)

David Xavier Sullivan is an American lawyer serving as the United States Attorney for the District of Connecticut since 2025.

== Early life, education, and military service ==
David X. Sullivan is a native of Danbury, Connecticut. He graduated from Catholic University of America (Bachelor's degree, 1982), then earned his Juris Doctor from the Columbus School of Law at Catholic University in 1988, and later completed an LL.M. in Taxation from Quinnipiac University School of Law (formerly University of Bridgeport School of Law) in 1991.

He is the son of the late William W. Sullivan, an attorney and former state representative in Connecticut.

== Career ==
Sullivan began his career as an Assistant United States Attorney in the United States Attorney's Office for the District of Connecticut (USAO-CT), where he served from 1989 to 2019. During his tenure he held leadership roles including heading the Asset Forfeiture Unit and acting as the National Money Laundering/Asset Forfeiture Coordinator for the United States Department of Justice.

After leaving public law, Sullivan entered private practice at the law firm McCarter & English LLP, focusing on regulatory compliance, civil litigation, and investigations for financial institutions.

=== Political candidacy ===
In 2020, Sullivan ran as the Republican candidate for Connecticut's 5th Congressional District. He positioned himself as a “law-and-order” conservative, focusing on tax cuts, smaller government and public safety issues. He was defeated by the incumbent, Jahana Hayes, in the general election.

=== U.S. Attorney for the District of Connecticut ===
On May 12, 2025, Attorney General Pam Bondi appointed Sullivan as Interim U.S. Attorney for the District of Connecticut. Following the statutory interim term, the federal judges for the district unanimously appointed him to serve as the full U.S. Attorney on September 8, 2025, bypassing the Senate confirmation process.
