= Janet C. Hall =

American judge (born 1948)

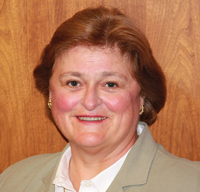

Senior Judge of the United States District Court for the District of Connecticut
- Incumbent
- Assumed office January 21, 2021

Chief Judge of the United States District Court for the District of Connecticut
- In office September 9, 2013 – September 8, 2018
- Preceded by: Alvin W. Thompson
- Succeeded by: Stefan R. Underhill

Judge of the United States District Court for the District of Connecticut
- In office September 18, 1997 – January 21, 2021
- Appointed by: Bill Clinton
- Preceded by: T. F. Gilroy Daly
- Succeeded by: Sarah A. L. Merriam

Personal details
- Born: September 15, 1948 (age 77) Lowell, Massachusetts, U.S.
- Education: Mount Holyoke College (AB); New York University (JD)

Janet Celeste Hall (born September 15, 1948) is a senior United States district judge of the United States District Court for the District of Connecticut. She sits in New Haven.

== Education and career ==
Born in Lowell, Massachusetts, Hall received an Artium Baccalaureus degree from Mount Holyoke College in 1970. She went on to earn a Juris Doctor from New York University School of Law three years later. After obtaining her J.D., Hall entered private practice for two years. Then, she landed a position as a trial attorney in the United States Department of Justice Antitrust Division, which she held until 1979. She was then a Special Assistant United States Attorney of the Eastern District of Virginia in 1979. From 1980 to 1997, she was in private practice in Hartford, Connecticut.

== Federal judicial service ==
Hall was nominated by President Bill Clinton on June 5, 1997, to a seat vacated by T. F. Gilroy Daly. She was confirmed by the United States Senate on September 11, 1997, and received her commission on September 18, 1997. She served as Chief Judge of the United States District Court for the District of Connecticut from September 2013 to September 2018. She assumed senior status on January 21, 2021.

Hall was featured in the Serial podcast The Retrievals. She presided over the sentencing of former nurse Donna Monticone, who stole hundreds of vials of fentanyl from patients at the Yale Reproductive Endocrinology and Infertility Lab, where she worked. The fentanyl was supposed to be used to administer moderate sedation to patients undergoing egg retrievals, but Monticone used the fentanyl herself and replaced it with saline solution. As detailed in The Retrievals, Monticone attended a number of these egg retrieval procedures knowing the patients were being given saline solution instead of sedation and witnessing their cries of pain. Despite numerous letters from victims detailing the immense physical and psychological pain Monticone caused, and despite sentencing guidelines that called for 4 to 5 years in prison, Hall only sentenced Monticone to four nonconsecutive weekends in prison.

== Sources ==
Legal offices
Preceded by T. F. Gilroy Daly	Judge of the United States District Court for the District of Connecticut; 1997–2021	Succeeded by Sarah A. L. Merriam
Preceded by Alvin W. Thompson	Chief Judge of the United States District Court for the District of Connecticut; 2013–2018	Succeeded by Stefan R. Underhill
