= Carroll C. Hincks =

American judge (1889–1964)

Senior Judge of the United States Court of Appeals for the Second Circuit
- In office May 15, 1959 – September 30, 1964

Judge of the United States Court of Appeals for the Second Circuit
- In office October 3, 1953 – May 15, 1959
- Appointed by: Dwight D. Eisenhower
- Preceded by: Thomas Walter Swan
- Succeeded by: J. Joseph Smith

Chief Judge of the United States District Court for the District of Connecticut
- In office 1948–1953
- Preceded by: Office established
- Succeeded by: J. Joseph Smith

Judge of the United States District Court for the District of Connecticut
- In office January 24, 1931 – December 7, 1953
- Appointed by: Herbert Hoover
- Preceded by: Warren Booth Burrows
- Succeeded by: Robert P. Anderson

Personal details
- Born: Carroll Clark Hincks; November 30, 1889 Andover, Massachusetts, U.S.
- Died: September 30, 1964 (aged 74) New Haven, Connecticut, U.S.
- Education: Yale University (AB, LLB)

Carroll Clark Hincks (November 30, 1889 – September 30, 1964) was a United States circuit judge of the United States Court of Appeals for the Second Circuit and previously was a United States District Judge of the United States District Court for the District of Connecticut.

== Education and career ==
Born on November 30, 1889, in Andover, Massachusetts, to Edward Hincks (who was on the faculty of Andover Theological Seminary) and Elizabeth Tyler Clark (the daughter of Charles P. Clark, former president of the New Haven Railroad), Hincks graduated from Phillips Andover Academy. He received an Artium Baccalaureus degree in 1911 from Yale University and a Bachelor of Laws in 1914 from Yale Law School. He entered private practice in New Haven, Connecticut from 1914 to 1916. He was a captain in the United States Army field artillery during World War I from 1917 to 1919. Hincks also served as an artillery officer in the Border Campaign of 1916. He returned to private practice in Waterbury, Connecticut with the firm of Meyer, Hincks & Traurig from 1919 to 1931.

== Federal judicial service ==
Hincks was nominated by President Herbert Hoover on December 15, 1930, to a seat on the United States District Court for the District of Connecticut vacated by Judge Warren Booth Burrows. He was confirmed by the United States Senate on January 13, 1931, and received his commission on January 24, 1931. He served as Chief Judge from 1948 to 1953. His service terminated on December 7, 1953, due to elevation to the Second Circuit.

Hincks received a recess appointment from President Dwight D. Eisenhower on October 3, 1953, to a seat on the United States Court of Appeals for the Second Circuit vacated by Judge Thomas Walter Swan. He was nominated to the same position by President Eisenhower on January 11, 1954. He was confirmed by the Senate on February 9, 1954, and received his commission on the same day. He assumed senior status on May 15, 1959. His service terminated on September 30, 1964, due to his death at Grace-New Haven Community Hospital in New Haven.

=== Notable case ===
Among Hincks' most notable cases on the district bench was the reorganization of the New Haven Railroad (1935–1947).

== Other service ==
According to Hincks' obituary in the New York Times, "Judge Hincks was active in Yale University affairs." He served as secretary of the committee charged with constructing the Yale Bowl and was active in Mory's.

== Personal ==
Hincks was married to Edith Walker Ney Hincks, who survived him.

Legal offices
Preceded by Warren Booth Burrows	Judge of the United States District Court for the District of Connecticut; 1931–1953	Succeeded by Robert P. Anderson
Preceded by Office established	Chief Judge of the United States District Court for the District of Connecticut; 1948–1953	Succeeded by J. Joseph Smith
Preceded by Thomas Walter Swan	Judge of the United States Court of Appeals for the Second Circuit; 1953–1959	Succeeded by J. Joseph Smith
