= Robert P. Butler =

American attorney and politician (1883–1971)

United States Attorney for the District of Connecticut
- In office 1934–1945
- President: Franklin D. Roosevelt
- Preceded by: George H. Cohen
- Succeeded by: Adrian W. Maher

Personal details
- Born: Robert Paul Butler; December 25, 1883 Prairieville, Michigan
- Died: February 8, 1971 (aged 86) Hartford, Connecticut
- Party: Democratic Party
- Education: Cornell University (B.A., 1905); Trinity College (Connecticut) (M.A., 1906)
- Profession: Lawyer

Robert Paul Butler (December 25, 1883 – February 8, 1971) was an American attorney who served as the United States Attorney for the District of Connecticut.

== Early life and education ==
Robert P. Butler was born in Prairieville, Michigan, on Christmas 1883. He graduated with a Bachelor of Arts degree from Cornell University in 1905 and earned a Master of Arts from Trinity College in 1906. Rather than attending a formal law school, Butler learnt law through reading the law and was admitted to the Connecticut Bar in 1915 and later to the federal courts.

== Legal career ==
He was appointed by President Franklin D. Roosevelt to serve as United States Attorney for the District of Connecticut in 1934 a position he held until 1945. He handled significant cases during his tenure, including legal issues arising from World War II and the 1944 Ringling Brothers and Barnum & Bailey Circus fire, which killed 168 people. Butler chaired a committee that managed the arbitration of over $1 million in claims related to the fire, earning praise for his ethical handling of the case. Following his federal service, he returned to private practice as a senior partner at Butler, Volpe & Sacco and served as president of the Hartford County Bar Association in 1948.

== Personal life ==
Butler was a resident of West Hartford, Connecticut, where he lived for over 65 years. He was actively involved in the community, including being a member of the Asylum Hill Congregational Church. Butler was also a patron of the arts, participating in a choral club and writing music and theater critiques for the Hartford Courant.

== Death and legacy ==
Robert P. Butler died on February 8, 1971, at the age of 87 in his home in West Hartford.
