= J. Joseph Smith =

American judge (1904–1980)

John Joseph Smith
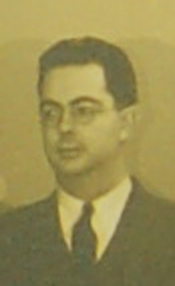

Senior Judge of the United States Court of Appeals for the Second Circuit
- In office November 6, 1971 – February 16, 1980

Judge of the United States Court of Appeals for the Second Circuit
- In office September 2, 1960 – November 6, 1971
- Appointed by: Dwight D. Eisenhower
- Preceded by: Carroll C. Hincks
- Succeeded by: Thomas Meskill

Chief Judge of the United States District Court for the District of Connecticut
- In office 1953–1960
- Preceded by: Carroll C. Hincks
- Succeeded by: Robert P. Anderson

Judge of the United States District Court for the District of Connecticut
- In office October 30, 1941 – September 13, 1960
- Appointed by: Franklin D. Roosevelt
- Preceded by: Edwin Stark Thomas
- Succeeded by: William H. Timbers

Member of the U.S. House of Representatives from Connecticut's 5th district
- In office January 3, 1935 – November 4, 1941
- Preceded by: Edward W. Goss
- Succeeded by: Joseph E. Talbot

Personal details
- Born: John Joseph Smith; January 25, 1904 Waterbury, Connecticut, U.S.
- Died: February 16, 1980 (aged 76) Waterbury, Connecticut, U.S.
- Party: Democratic
- Education: Yale University (BA, LLB)

John Joseph Smith (January 25, 1904 – February 16, 1980) was an American lawyer, a United States representative from Connecticut, a United States circuit judge of the United States Court of Appeals for the Second Circuit and a United States district judge of the United States District Court for the District of Connecticut.

== Education and career ==
Born in Waterbury, Connecticut, Smith attended the public schools, and earned his Bachelor of Arts degree from Yale University in 1925 and his Bachelor of Laws from Yale's law department (later Yale Law School) in 1927. Smith was admitted to the bar in 1927. He was a research fellow at Yale Law School from 1927 to 1928. Smith served in the Field Artillery Reserves from 1925 to 1935. He was in private practice in Waterbury from 1928 to 1941.

== Congressional service ==
Smith was elected as a Democrat to the United States House of Representatives, serving as a United States representative from Connecticut from 1935 to 1941 (in the Seventy-fourth, Seventy-fifth, Seventy-sixth, and Seventy-seventh Congresses). He resigned from Congress on November 4, 1941, to accept appointment to the federal bench.

== Federal judicial service ==
Smith was nominated by President Franklin D. Roosevelt on October 16, 1941, to a seat on the United States District Court for the District of Connecticut vacated by Judge Edwin Stark Thomas. He was confirmed by the United States Senate on October 28, 1941, and received his commission on October 30, 1941. He served as Chief Judge from 1953 to 1960. His service terminated on September 13, 1960, due to his elevation to the Second Circuit.

Smith was nominated by President Dwight D. Eisenhower on January 11, 1960, to a seat on the United States Court of Appeals for the Second Circuit vacated by Judge Carroll C. Hincks. He was confirmed by the Senate on September 1, 1960, and received his commission the next day. He assumed senior status on November 6, 1971. His service terminated on February 16, 1980, due to his death.

== Later life and death ==
Smith resided in West Hartford, Connecticut. He died in Waterbury on February 16, 1980. Smith is interred at Calvary Cemetery in Waterbury.

== Sources ==
- "John Joseph Smith". Biographical Directory of the United States Congress.

U.S. House of Representatives
Preceded by Edward W. Goss	Member of the U.S. House of Representatives from Connecticut's 5th congressional district 1935–1941	Succeeded by Joseph E. Talbot
Legal offices
Preceded by Edwin Stark Thomas	Judge of the United States District Court for the District of Connecticut; 1941–1960	Succeeded by William H. Timbers
Preceded by Carroll C. Hincks	Chief Judge of the United States District Court for the District of Connecticut; 1953–1960	Succeeded by Robert P. Anderson
Preceded by Carroll C. Hincks	Judge of the United States Court of Appeals for the Second Circuit; 1960–1971	Succeeded by Thomas Meskill
