= David B. Fein =

American attorney (born 1970)

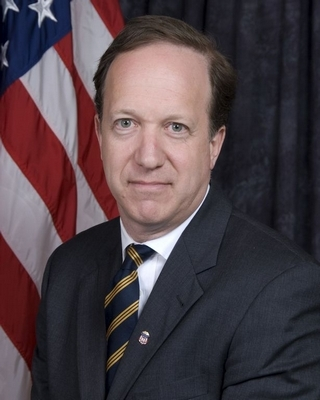

United States Attorney for the District of Connecticut
- In office May 10, 2010 – May 13, 2013
- President: Barack Obama
- Preceded by: Nora Dannehy (acting)
- Succeeded by: Deirdre M. Daly

Personal details
- Born: August 29, 1970 (age 54)
- Political party: Democratic
- Education: Dartmouth College (BA); New York University (JD)

David B. Fein (born August 29, 1970) is an American attorney who served as the United States Attorney for the District of Connecticut from 2010 to 2013.
