= T. Emmet Clarie =

American judge (1913–1997)

Senior Judge of the United States District Court for the District of Connecticut
- In office January 1, 1983 – September 24, 1997

Chief Judge of the United States District Court for the District of Connecticut
- In office 1974–1983
- Preceded by: Mosher Joseph Blumenfeld
- Succeeded by: T. F. Gilroy Daly

Judge of the United States District Court for the District of Connecticut
- In office September 18, 1961 – January 1, 1983
- Appointed by: John F. Kennedy
- Preceded by: Seat established by 75 Stat. 80
- Succeeded by: Peter Collins Dorsey

Personal details
- Born: Thomas Emmet Clarie; January 1, 1913 Killingly, Connecticut, U.S.
- Died: September 24, 1997 (aged 84) Danielson, Connecticut, U.S.
- Party: Democratic
- Education: Providence College (Ph.B.); Hartford College of Law (LL.B.)

Thomas Emmet Clarie (January 1, 1913 – September 24, 1997) was a United States district judge of the United States District Court for the District of Connecticut.

== Education and career ==
Clarie was born on January 1, 1913, in Killingly, Connecticut, to his father, Thomas C. Clarie, who was a building contractor and stonemason and his mother Kathryn Burns Clarie. Clarie received a Bachelor of Philosophy degree in 1933 from Providence College and a Bachelor of Laws in 1938 from Hartford College of Law (now University of Connecticut School of Law). He was a member of the Connecticut House of Representatives from 1937 to 1943, serving as Democratic floor leader from 1939 to 1943. He entered private practice in Danielson, Connecticut from 1940 to 1961. He was an assistant to the state statute revision commissioner in 1945. He served on the Connecticut State Liquor Commission from 1949 to 1961, as commissioner from 1949 to 1955 and as chairman from 1955 to 1961. He was clerk for the Connecticut Senate in 1949. He was prosecutor for the Killingly Town Court in Danielson in 1951.

== Federal judicial service ==
Clarie was nominated by President John F. Kennedy on September 5, 1961, to the United States District Court for the District of Connecticut, to a new seat authorized by 75 Stat. 80. He was confirmed by the United States Senate on September 14, 1961, and received his commission on September 18, 1961. He served as Chief Judge from 1974 to 1983. He was a member of the Judicial Conference of the United States from 1977 to 1980. He assumed senior status on January 1, 1983. His service terminated on September 24, 1997, due to his death of viral pneumonia in Danielson.

=== Notable case ===
Clarie's most famous case was the trial of members of the Puerto Rican nationalist group Los Macheteros accused of robbing a Wells Fargo bank in West Hartford, Connecticut, of nearly $7.6 million. Claire presided over the trial, at which the defense lawyers were William Kunstler and Leonard Weinglass. By 1989, most of the 19 defendants were convicted (either at trial or following a guilty plea); three were fugitives who were never captured, one was acquitted, and one defendant's charges were dismissed. Clarie was credited with keeping cool under pressure.

== Personal ==
Although Clarie kept his chambers in Hartford, Connecticut, the state capital, he lived in the rural small town of Danielson in a Colonial-style house on a 220-acre farm, making the 104-mile round trip almost every workday. He considered himself a small-town lawyer. Clarie was married to Gertrude Reynolds Clarie (d. 1995).

Legal offices
Preceded by Seat established by 75 Stat. 80	Judge of the United States District Court for the District of Connecticut; 1961–1983	Succeeded by Peter Collins Dorsey
Preceded by Mosher Joseph Blumenfeld	Chief Judge of the United States District Court for the District of Connecticut; 1974–1983	Succeeded by T. F. Gilroy Daly
