= Jon O. Newman =

American judge (born 1932)

Jon Newman
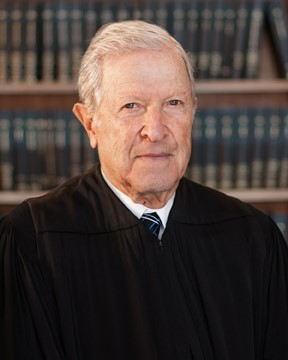

Senior Judge of the United States Court of Appeals for the Second Circuit
- Incumbent
- Assumed office July 1, 1997

Chief Judge of the United States Court of Appeals for the Second Circuit
- In office June 30, 1993 – July 1, 1997
- Preceded by: Thomas Joseph Meskill
- Succeeded by: Ralph K. Winter Jr.

Judge of the United States Court of Appeals for the Second Circuit
- In office June 21, 1979 – July 1, 1997
- Appointed by: Jimmy Carter
- Preceded by: Seat established
- Succeeded by: Robert Katzmann

Judge of the United States District Court for the District of Connecticut
- In office December 15, 1971 – June 21, 1979
- Appointed by: Richard Nixon
- Preceded by: William H. Timbers
- Succeeded by: José A. Cabranes

United States Attorney for the District of Connecticut
- In office 1964–1969
- President: Lyndon Johnson
- Preceded by: Owen Eagan
- Succeeded by: Stewart Jones

Personal details
- Born: Jon Ormond Newman; May 2, 1932 (age 94) New York City, New York, U.S.
- Spouse(s): Martha Silberman (deceased); Ann Leventhal
- Children: 3
- Education: Princeton University (AB); Yale University (LLB)

Jon Ormond Newman (born May 2, 1932) is a senior United States circuit judge of the United States Court of Appeals for the Second Circuit.

== Early life and career ==
Born in New York City, Newman earned his Artium Baccalaureus degree from Princeton University in 1953 and his Bachelor of Laws from Yale Law School in 1956. After Yale, he clerked for Judge George Thomas Washington of the United States Court of Appeals for the District of Columbia Circuit and then clerked for United States Supreme Court Chief Justice Earl Warren from 1957 to 1958. Additionally, he was in the United States Army Reserve from 1954 to 1962.

He was in private practice from 1958 to 1960 in Hartford, Connecticut, and served as a graduate instructor at Trinity College. He also served as special counsel to the Governor of Connecticut in 1960. He was executive assistant to the United States Secretary of Health, Education, and Welfare from 1961 to 1962 and then joined the staff of United States Senator Abraham Ribicoff as administrative assistant from 1963 to 1964. He was the United States Attorney for the District of Connecticut from 1964 to 1969 when Richard Nixon took office. He entered private practice in Hartford again until 1971 when he was nominated to a federal district judgeship.

== Federal judicial service ==
Newman was nominated by President Richard Nixon on December 2, 1971, to a seat on the United States District Court for the District of Connecticut vacated by Judge William H. Timbers. He was confirmed by the United States Senate on December 11, 1971, received his commission on December 15, 1971, and began serving as a judge on January 17, 1972. His service as a District Judge terminated on June 25, 1979, due to his elevation to the Second Circuit.

Newman was nominated by President Jimmy Carter on April 30, 1979, to the United States Court of Appeals for the Second Circuit, to a new seat created by 92 Stat. 1629. He was confirmed by the Senate on June 19, 1979, and received his commission on June 21, 1979. He served as Chief Judge from 1993 to 1997. He assumed senior status on July 1, 1997.

== Honor ==
On December 8, 2016, at a special ceremony at the Supreme Court of the United States, Justice Elena Kagan presented to Judge Newman, on behalf of the federal judiciary, the 2016 Edward J. Devitt Distinguished Service to Justice Award. The Devitt Award honors an Article III judge who has achieved a distinguished career and made significant contributions to the administration of justice, the advancement of the rule of law, and the improvement of society as a whole.

== Noteworthy decisions ==
- Abele v. Markle, 351 F. Supp. 224 (D. Conn. 1972) - Connecticut statute prohibiting abortions, except to save life of mother, was unconstitutional.
- SCM Corp. v. Xerox Corp., 463 F. Supp. 983 (D. Conn. 1978) - After 14-month jury trial, probably the longest federal civil jury trial, Xerox Corp. did not violate antitrust laws by maintaining its plain paper copying monopoly.
- Salinger v. Random House 811 F.2d 90 (2d Cir.1987) - J.D. Salinger's biographer used too many of the author's letters to be exempted from copyright infringement by the doctrine of "fair use"
- Kadic v. Karadzic, 70 F.3d 232 (2d Cir. 1996) – There was subject matter jurisdiction under the Alien Tort Claim Act, 28 U.S.C.S. § 1350, to pursue an action for war crimes against a private individual
- American Geophysical Union v. Texaco, 60 F.3d 913 (2nd Cir., 1994) – Texaco's bulk photocopying of articles from scientific journals for its researchers was not fair use since it was in support of the company's commercial goals and not the public good. The first Second Circuit copyright case to consider transformative use.
- Leibovitz v. Paramount Pictures Corp., 137 F.3d 109 (2nd Cir. 1998) - poster for movie "Naked Gun 33 1/3" with photo of Demi Moore visibly pregnant and head of Leslie Nielsen replacing Moore's head and caption "Coming in February" was parody of Vanity Fair cover and exempt from copyright infringement as "fair use."
- "United States of America v. Cromitie (Williams)". gpo.gov. 2013. "(2nd Cir. 2013) (see 2009 Bronx terrorism plot)"
- Trump v. Deutsche Bank (2019) 943 F.3d 627 (2nd Cir. 2019) - Deutsche Bank must hand over financial records of Trump and others to the House of Representatives. This ruling along with 2 others regarding Trump's financial records was heard by the Supreme Court in 2020, and held that the lower court had not adequately addressed separation of powers concerns in the rulings.

== See also ==
- List of Jewish American jurists
- List of law clerks for the chief justice of the United States
- List of United States federal judges by longevity of service

== Sources ==
- Appearances on C-SPAN

Legal offices
Preceded by William H. Timbers	Judge of the United States District Court for the District of Connecticut; 1971–1979	Succeeded by José A. Cabranes
New seat	Judge of the United States Court of Appeals for the Second Circuit; 1979–1997	Succeeded by Robert Katzmann
Preceded by Thomas Joseph Meskill	Chief Judge of the United States Court of Appeals for the Second Circuit; 1993–1997	Succeeded by Ralph K. Winter Jr.
