= United States District Court for the District of Connecticut =

U.S. federal district court in Connecticut

- (D. Conn.)
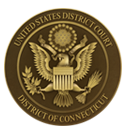

- Location: Richard C. Lee U.S. Courthouse (New Haven) More locations: Hartford; Bridgeport
- Appeals to: Second Circuit
- Established: September 24, 1789
- Judges: 8
- Chief Judge: Michael P. Shea

Officers of the court
- U.S. Attorney: David X. Sullivan
- U.S. Marshal: Lawrence Bobnick (acting)
- www.ctd.uscourts.gov

The United States District Court for the District of Connecticut (in case citations, D. Conn.) is the federal district court whose jurisdiction is the state of Connecticut. The court has offices in Bridgeport, Hartford, and New Haven. Appeals from the court are heard by the United States Court of Appeals for the Second Circuit. It was one of the original 13 courts established by the Judiciary Act of 1789, 1 Stat. 73, on September 24, 1789. The Court initially had a single judge, and remained so composed until March 3, 1927, when a second judge was added by 1927 44 Stat. 1348. Six additional judgeships were created between 1961 and 1990 to bring about the current total of eight judges. Court offices at Hartford and New Haven are located in the Abraham A. Ribicoff Federal Building and the Richard C. Lee United States Courthouse.

Cases decided by the District of Connecticut are appealed to the United States Court of Appeals for the Second Circuit (except for patent claims and claims against the U.S. government under the Tucker Act, which are appealed to the Federal Circuit).

The United States Attorney's Office for the District of Connecticut represents the United States in civil and criminal litigation in the court. As of May 12, 2025, the United States attorney is David X. Sullivan.

The United States marshal for the District of Connecticut is Lawrence Bobnick.

== Current judges ==
As of February 18, 2025:

| # | Title | Judge | Duty station | Born | Term of service | | | Appointed by |
| # | Title | Judge | Duty station | Born | Active | Chief | Senior | Appointed by |
|---|---|---|---|---|---|---|---|---|
| 36 | Chief Judge | Michael P. Shea | Hartford | 1967 | 2012–present | 2022–present | — | Obama |
| 38 | District Judge | Victor Allen Bolden | New Haven | 1965 | 2014–present | — | — | Obama |
| 39 | District Judge | Kari A. Dooley | Bridgeport | 1963 | 2018–present | — | — | Trump |
| 41 | District Judge | Sarala Nagala | Hartford | 1983 | 2021–present | — | — | Biden |
| 42 | District Judge | Omar A. Williams | Hartford | 1977 | 2021–present | — | — | Biden |
| 43 | District Judge | Vernon D. Oliver | Hartford | 1971 | 2023–present | — | — | Biden |
| 44 | District Judge | Sarah F. Russell | Bridgeport | 1976 | 2024–present | — | — | Biden |
| 45 | District Judge | vacant | — | — | — | — | — | — |
| 27 | Senior Judge | Robert Chatigny | Hartford | 1951 | 1994–2016 | 2003–2009 | 2016–present | Clinton |
| 29 | Senior Judge | Alvin W. Thompson | Hartford | 1953 | 1994–2018 | 2009–2013 | 2018–present | Clinton |
| 30 | Senior Judge | Janet Bond Arterton | inactive | 1944 | 1995–2014 | — | 2014–present | Clinton |
| 32 | Senior Judge | Janet C. Hall | New Haven | 1948 | 1997–2021 | 2013–2018 | 2021–present | Clinton |
| 33 | Senior Judge | Stefan R. Underhill | Bridgeport | 1956 | 1999–2022 | 2018–2022 | 2022–present | Clinton |
| 35 | Senior Judge | Vanessa Lynne Bryant | inactive | 1954 | 2007–2021 | — | 2021–present | G.W. Bush |

== Vacancies and pending nominations ==
| Seat | Prior judge's duty station | Seat last held by | Vacancy reason | Date of vacancy | Nominee | Date of nomination |
|---|---|---|---|---|---|---|
| 7 | New Haven | Jeffrey A. Meyer | Death | January 12, 2025 | — | — |

== Former judges ==
| # | Judge | Born–died | Active service | Chief Judge | Senior status | Appointed by | Reason for termination |
|---|---|---|---|---|---|---|---|
| 1 | Richard Law | 1733–1806 | 1789–1806 | — | — | Washington | death |
| 2 | Pierpont Edwards | 1750–1826 | 1806–1826 | — | — | Jefferson | death |
| 3 | William Bristol | 1779–1836 | 1826–1836 | — | — | J.Q. Adams | death |
| 4 | Andrew T. Judson | 1784–1853 | 1836–1853 | — | — | Jackson | death |
| 5 | Charles A. Ingersoll | 1798–1860 | 1853–1860 | — | — | Pierce | death |
| 6 | William Davis Shipman | 1818–1898 | 1860–1873 | — | — | Buchanan | resignation |
| 7 | Nathaniel Shipman | 1828–1906 | 1873–1892 (Note: Recess appointment; formally nominated on December 2, 1873, confirmed by the United States Senate on December 8, 1873, and received commission the same day.) | — | — | Grant | elevation |
| 8 | William Kneeland Townsend | 1849–1907 | 1892–1902 | — | — | B. Harrison | elevation |
| 9 | James Perry Platt | 1851–1913 | 1902–1913 | — | — | T. Roosevelt | death |
| 10 | Edwin Stark Thomas | 1872–1952 | 1913–1939 | — | — | Wilson | resignation |
| 11 | Warren Booth Burrows | 1877–1952 | 1928–1930 | — | — | Coolidge | resignation |
| 12 | Carroll C. Hincks | 1889–1964 | 1931–1953 | 1948–1953 | — | Hoover | elevation |
| 13 | J. Joseph Smith | 1904–1980 | 1941–1960 | 1953–1960 | — | F. Roosevelt | elevation |
| 14 | Robert P. Anderson | 1906–1978 | 1954–1964 | 1960–1964 | — | Eisenhower | elevation |
| 15 | William H. Timbers | 1915–1994 | 1960–1971 | 1964–1971 | — | Eisenhower | elevation |
| 16 | Mosher Joseph Blumenfeld | 1904–1988 | 1961–1977 | 1971–1974 | 1977–1988 | Kennedy | death |
| 17 | T. Emmet Clarie | 1913–1997 | 1961–1983 | 1974–1983 | 1983–1997 | Kennedy | death |
| 18 | Robert C. Zampano | 1928–2004 | 1964–1977 | — | 1977–1994 | L. Johnson | retirement |
| 19 | Jon O. Newman | 1932–present | 1971–1979 | — | — | Nixon | elevation |
| 20 | T. F. Gilroy Daly | 1931–1996 | 1977–1996 | 1983–1988 | — | Carter | death |
| 21 | Ellen Bree Burns | 1923–2019 | 1978–1992 | 1988–1992 | 1992–2019 | Carter | death |
| 22 | Warren William Eginton | 1924–2019 | 1979–1992 | — | 1992–2019 | Carter | death |
| 23 | José A. Cabranes | 1940–present | 1979–1994 | 1992–1994 | — | Carter | elevation |
| 24 | Peter Collins Dorsey | 1931–2012 | 1983–1998 | 1994–1998 | 1998–2012 | Reagan | death |
| 25 | Alan Harris Nevas | 1928–2025 | 1985–1997 | — | 1997–2009 | Reagan | retirement |
| 26 | Alfred V. Covello | 1933–2025 | 1992–2003 | 1998–2003 | 2003–2025 | G.H.W. Bush | death |
| 28 | Dominic J. Squatrito | 1938–2021 | 1994–2004 | — | 2004–2021 | Clinton | death |
| 31 | Christopher F. Droney | 1954–present | 1997–2011 | — | — | Clinton | elevation |
| 34 | Mark R. Kravitz | 1950–2012 | 2003–2012 | — | — | G.W. Bush | death |
| 37 | Jeffrey A. Meyer | 1963–2025 | 2014–2025 | — | — | Obama | death |
| 40 | Sarah A. L. Merriam | 1971–present | 2021–2022 | — | — | Biden | elevation |

== Chief judges ==
Chief Judge
| Hincks | 1948–1953 |
| Smith | 1953–1960 |
| Anderson | 1960–1964 |
| Timbers | 1964–1971 |
| Blumenfeld | 1971–1974 |
| Clarie | 1974–1983 |
| Daly | 1983–1988 |
| Burns | 1988–1992 |
| Cabranes | 1992–1994 |
| Dorsey | 1994–1998 |
| Covello | 1998–2003 |
| Chatigny | 2003–2009 |
| Thompson | 2009–2013 |
| Hall | 2013–2018 |
| Underhill | 2018–2022 |
| Shea | 2022–present |

Chief judges have administrative responsibilities with respect to their district court. Unlike the Supreme Court, where one justice is specifically nominated to be chief, the office of chief judge rotates among the district court judges. To be chief, a judge must have been in active service on the court for at least one year, be under the age of 65, and have not previously served as chief judge.

A vacancy is filled by the judge highest in seniority among the group of qualified judges. The chief judge serves for a term of seven years, or until age 70, whichever occurs first. The age restrictions are waived if no members of the court would otherwise be qualified for the position.

When the office was created in 1948, the chief judge was the longest-serving judge who had not elected to retire, on what has since 1958 been known as senior status, or declined to serve as chief judge. After August 6, 1959, judges could not become or remain chief after turning 70 years old. The current rules have been in operation since October 1, 1982.

== Succession of seats ==
Seat 1
Seat established on September 24, 1789 by 1 Stat. 73
| Law | 1789–1806 |
| Edwards | 1806–1826 |
| Bristol | 1826–1836 |
| Judson | 1836–1853 |
| Ingersoll | 1853–1860 |
| W. Shipman | 1860–1873 |
| N. Shipman | 1873–1892 |
| Townsend | 1892–1902 |
| Platt | 1902–1913 |
| Thomas | 1913–1939 |
| Smith | 1941–1960 |
| Timbers | 1960–1971 |
| Newman | 1971–1979 |
| Cabranes | 1979–1994 |
| Arterton | 1995–2014 |
| Bolden | 2014–present |

Seat 2
Seat established on March 3, 1927 by 44 Stat. 1348
| Burrows | 1928–1930 |
| Hincks | 1931–1953 |
| Anderson | 1954–1964 |
| Zampano | 1964–1977 |
| Daly | 1977–1996 |
| Hall | 1997–2021 |
| Merriam | 2021–2022 |
| Russell | 2024–present |

Seat 3
Seat established on May 19, 1961 by 75 Stat. 80
| Blumenfeld | 1961–1977 |
| Burns | 1978–1992 |
| Thompson | 1994–2018 |
| Williams | 2021–present |

Seat 4
Seat established on May 19, 1961 by 75 Stat. 80
| Clarie | 1961–1983 |
| Dorsey | 1983–1998 |
| Underhill | 1999–2022 |
| Oliver | 2023–present |

Seat 5
Seat established on October 20, 1978 by 92 Stat. 1629
| Eginton | 1979–1992 |
| Chatigny | 1994–2016 |
| Dooley | 2018–present |

Seat 6
Seat established on July 10, 1984 by 98 Stat. 333
| Nevas | 1985–1997 |
| Droney | 1997–2011 |
| Shea | 2012–present |

Seat 7
Seat established on December 1, 1990 by 104 Stat. 5089
| Covello | 1992–2003 |
| Kravitz | 2003–2012 |
| Meyer | 2014–2025 |
| vacant | 2025–present |

Seat 8
Seat established on December 1, 1990 by 104 Stat. 5089
| Squatrito | 1994–2004 |
| Bryant | 2007–2021 |
| Nagala | 2021–present |

== List of U.S. attorneys ==
| U.S. Attorney | Term started | Term ended | Presidents served under |
|---|---|---|---|
| Pierpont Edwards | 1789 | 1806 | George Washington, John Adams, and Thomas Jefferson |
| Hezekiah Huntington | 1806 | 1829 | Thomas Jefferson, James Madison, James Monroe, and John Quincy Adams |
| Nathan Smith | 1829 | 1829 | Andrew Jackson |
| Asa Child | 1829 | 1834 | Andrew Jackson |
| William S. Holabird | 1834 | 1841 | Andrew Jackson, Martin Van Buren, and William Henry Harrison |
| Charles Chapman | 1841 | 1844 | John Tyler |
| Jonathan Stoddard | 1844 | 1849 | John Tyler and James K. Polk |
| Thomas Clap Perkins | 1849 | 1853 | Zachary Taylor and Millard Fillmore |
| Elisha S. Abernethy | 1853 | 1853 | Franklin Pierce |
| William Davis Shipman | 1853 | 1860 | Franklin Pierce and James Buchanan |
| Tilton E. Doolittle | 1860 | 1861 | James Buchanan |
| Hiram Willey | 1861 | 1869 | Abraham Lincoln, Andrew Johnson, and Ulysses S. Grant |
| Calvin G. Child | 1870 | 1880 | Ulysses S. Grant and Rutherford B. Hayes |
| Daniel Chadwick | 1880 | 1884 | Rutherford B. Hayes, James Garfield, and Chester A. Arthur |
| Lewis E. Stanton | 1884 | 1888 | Chester A. Arthur and Grover Cleveland |
| George G. Sill | 1888 | 1892 | Grover Cleveland and Benjamin Harrison |
| George P. McLean | 1892 | 1896 | Benjamin Harrison and Grover Cleveland |
| Charles W. Comstock | 1896 | 1900 | Grover Cleveland and William McKinley |
| Francis H. Parker | 1900 | 1908 | William McKinley and Theodore Roosevelt |
| John T. Robinson | 1908 | 1912 | Theodore Roosevelt and William Howard Taft |
| Frederick A. Scott | 1912 | 1915 | William Howard Taft and Woodrow Wilson |
| Thomas J. Spellacy | 1915 | 1918 | Woodrow Wilson |
| John Francis Crosby | 1918 | 1919 | Woodrow Wilson |
| Edward L. Smith | 1919 | 1923 | Woodrow Wilson and Warren Harding |
| Allan K. Smith | 1923 | 1925 | Calvin Coolidge |
| John Buckley | 1925 | 1933 | Calvin Coolidge and Herbert Hoover |
| Frank Bergin | 1933 | 1934 | Franklin D. Roosevelt |
| George H. Cohen | 1934 | 1934 | Franklin D. Roosevelt |
| Robert P. Butler | 1934 | 1945 | Franklin D. Roosevelt |
| Adrian W. Maher | 1945 | 1953 | Harry Truman |
| Simon S. Cohen | 1953 | 1958 | Dwight D. Eisenhower |
| Harry W. Hultgren Jr. | 1958 | 1961 | Dwight D. Eisenhower |
| Robert C. Zampano | 1961 | 1964 | John F. Kennedy and Lyndon B. Johnson |
| F. Owen Eagan | 1964 | 1964 | Lyndon B. Johnson |
| Jon O. Newman | 1964 | 1969 | Lyndon B. Johnson |
| Stewart H. Jones | 1969 | 1974 | Richard Nixon |
| Harold J. Pickerstein | 1974 | 1974 | Richard Nixon and Gerald Ford |
| Peter Collins Dorsey | 1974 | 1977 | Gerald Ford |
| Richard Blumenthal | 1977 | 1981 | Jimmy Carter |
| Alan Harris Nevas | 1981 | 1985 | Ronald Reagan |
| Stanley A. Twardy Jr. | 1985 | 1991 | Ronald Reagan and George H. W. Bush |
| Richard N. Palmer | 1991 | 1991 | George H. W. Bush |
| Albert S. Dabrowski | 1991 | 1993 | George H. W. Bush and Bill Clinton |
| Christopher F. Droney | 1993 | 1997 | Bill Clinton |
| John H. Durham | 1997 | 1998 | Bill Clinton |
| Stephen C. Robinson | 1998 | 2001 | Bill Clinton and George W. Bush |
| John A. Danaher III | 2001 | 2002 | George W. Bush |
| Kevin J. O’Connor | 2002 | 2008 | George W. Bush |
| Nora R. Dannehy | 2008 | 2010 | George W. Bush and Barack Obama |
| David B. Fein | 2010 | 2013 | Barack Obama |
| Deirdre M. Daly | 2013 | 2017 | Barack Obama and Donald Trump |
| John H. Durham | 2017 | 2021 | Donald Trump and Joe Biden |
| Vanessa R. Avery | 2022 | 2025 | Joe Biden |
| Marc H. Silverman (Acting) | 2025 | 2025 | |
| David X. Sullivan | 2025 | | |

== See also ==
- Courts of Connecticut
- List of current United States district judges
- List of United States federal courthouses in Connecticut
