= James Perry Platt =

American judge (1851–1913)

Judge of the United States District Court for the District of Connecticut
- In office February 28, 1902 – January 26, 1913
- Appointed by: Theodore Roosevelt
- Preceded by: William Kneeland Townsend
- Succeeded by: Edwin Stark Thomas

Member of the Connecticut House of Representatives
- In office 1878-1879

Personal details
- Born: James Perry Platt; March 31, 1851 Towanda, Pennsylvania, U.S.
- Died: January 26, 1913 (aged 61)
- Education: Yale University (AB, LLB)

James Perry Platt (March 31, 1851 – January 26, 1913) was a United States district judge of the United States District Court for the District of Connecticut.

== Education and career ==
Born in Towanda, Pennsylvania, to Senator Orville H. Platt, he received an Artium Baccalaureus degree from Yale University in 1873 and a Bachelor of Laws from Yale Law School in 1875. He was in private practice in Meriden, Connecticut from 1875 to 1902. He was a member of the Connecticut House of Representatives from 1878 to 1879. He was city attorney of Meriden from 1879 to 1893. He was a Judge of the Meriden City Court from 1893 to 1902.

== Federal judicial service ==
Platt was nominated by President Theodore Roosevelt on February 18, 1902, to a seat on the United States District Court for the District of Connecticut vacated by William Kneeland Townsend. He was confirmed by the United States Senate on February 28, 1902, and received his commission the same day. Platt served in that capacity until his death on January 26, 1913.

== Sources ==
Legal offices
Preceded by William Kneeland Townsend	Judge of the United States District Court for the District of Connecticut; 1902–1913	Succeeded by Edwin Stark Thomas
