= T. F. Gilroy Daly =

American judge (1931–1996)

Chief Judge of the United States District Court for the District of Connecticut
- In office 1983–1988
- Preceded by: T. Emmet Clarie
- Succeeded by: Ellen Bree Burns

Judge of the United States District Court for the District of Connecticut
- In office August 5, 1977 – July 11, 1996
- Appointed by: Jimmy Carter
- Preceded by: Robert C. Zampano
- Succeeded by: Janet C. Hall

Personal details
- Born: Thomas Francis Gilroy Daly; February 25, 1931 Fairfield, Connecticut, U.S.
- Died: July 11, 1996 (aged 65) Roxbury, Connecticut, U.S.
- Education: Georgetown University (BA); Yale University (LLB)

Thomas Francis Gilroy Daly (February 25, 1931 – July 11, 1996) was a United States district judge of the United States District Court for the District of Connecticut. He was the younger brother of Michael J. Daly, who received the Medal of Honor in 1945 for actions during World War II.

== Education and career ==
Born Thomas Francis Gilroy Daly on February 25, 1931, in Fairfield, Connecticut, Daly graduated from Georgetown College (now Georgetown University) with a Bachelor of Arts degree in 1952. He served in the United States Army Rangers as a lieutenant from 1952 to 1954. He received a Bachelor of Laws in 1957 from Yale Law School. He was in private practice in Washington, D.C. from 1957 to 1961. He was an Assistant United States Attorney for the Southern District of New York from 1961 to 1964. He was in private practice in Fairfield from 1964 to 1967. He was a deputy attorney general of the State of Connecticut from 1967 to 1971. He was a special assistant to the attorney general of the State of Connecticut from 1971 to 1975. He was a deputy treasurer of the State of Connecticut from 1975 to 1976. He was the Insurance Commissioner of the State of Connecticut from 1976 to 1977.

=== Personal ===
Daly's great-grandfather, Thomas Francis Gilroy, was an Irish immigrant who was Mayor of New York City in the 1890s. His father, Colonel Paul Daly, was a World War I and World War II veteran who had received the Distinguished Service Cross and twice been nominated for the Medal of Honor. Daly's brother, Michael J. Daly, was a Medal of Honor recipient for actions during World War II.

=== Notable client ===
As a trial lawyer, Daly gained prominence when he won freedom for Peter A. Reilly of Litchfield County, Connecticut, who had been wrongfully convicted of murdering his mother. With the help of a private investigator, Daly uncovered new evidence that resulted in Reilly being cleared of the crime and released from jail.

== Federal judicial service ==
Daly was nominated by President Jimmy Carter on June 29, 1977, to a seat on the United States District Court for the District of Connecticut vacated by Judge Robert C. Zampano. He was confirmed by the United States Senate on August 5, 1977, and received his commission on August 5, 1977. He served as Chief Judge from 1983 to 1988. His service terminated on July 11, 1996, due to his death of melanoma in his home in Roxbury, Connecticut. During his tenure, he reduced a severe backlog of cases by calling on out-of-state judges to help try Connecticut cases and by winning approval for additional full-time judges.

== Notable case ==
As a judge, Daly presided over several high-profile trials, including the Waterbury, Connecticut municipal corruption case, which ended in 1992 when he sent the former Mayor Joseph J. Santopietro to Federal prison for nine years. In May 1995, in a landmark decision, he ruled that state police can be held liable for taping telephone conversations in barracks.

Legal offices
Preceded by Robert C. Zampano	Judge of the United States District Court for the District of Connecticut; 1977–1996	Succeeded by Janet C. Hall
Preceded by T. Emmet Clarie	Chief Judge of the United States District Court for the District of Connecticut; 1983–1988	Succeeded by Ellen Bree Burns
