= Alvin W. Thompson =

American judge (born 1953)

Senior Judge of the United States District Court for the District of Connecticut
- Incumbent
- Assumed office August 31, 2018

Chief Judge of the United States District Court for the District of Connecticut
- In office September 2009 – September 2013
- Preceded by: Robert Chatigny
- Succeeded by: Janet C. Hall

Judge of the United States District Court for the District of Connecticut
- In office October 11, 1994 – August 31, 2018
- Appointed by: Bill Clinton
- Preceded by: Ellen Bree Burns
- Succeeded by: Omar A. Williams

Personal details
- Born: March 2, 1953 (age 73) Baltimore, Maryland, U.S.
- Education: Princeton University (BA); Yale University (JD)

Alvin Wesley Thompson Jr. (born March 2, 1953) is a senior United States district judge of the United States District Court for the District of Connecticut.

== Education and career ==
Born in 1953 in Baltimore, Maryland, Thompson received a Bachelor of Arts from Princeton University in 1975 and a Juris Doctor from Yale Law School in 1978. He was in private practice in Hartford, Connecticut, from 1978 to 1994.

== Federal judicial service ==
Thompson was nominated to the United States District Court for the District of Connecticut by President Bill Clinton on September 14, 1994, to a seat vacated by Ellen Bree Burns. He was confirmed by the United States Senate on October 7, 1994, and received his commission on October 11, 1994. He served as Chief Judge from September 2009 to September 2013. He assumed senior status on August 31, 2018.

== See also ==
- List of African-American federal judges
- List of African-American jurists

Legal offices
Preceded by Ellen Bree Burns	Judge of the United States District Court for the District of Connecticut; 1994–2018	Succeeded by Omar A. Williams
Preceded by Robert Chatigny	Chief Judge of the United States District Court for the District of Connecticut; 2009–2013	Succeeded by Janet C. Hall
