= Robert C. Zampano =

American judge (1928–2004)

Senior Judge of the United States District Court for the District of Connecticut
- In office June 1, 1977 – April 1, 1994

Judge of the United States District Court for the District of Connecticut
- In office August 15, 1964 – June 1, 1977
- Appointed by: Lyndon B. Johnson
- Preceded by: Robert P. Anderson
- Succeeded by: T. F. Gilroy Daly

Personal details
- Born: Robert Carmine Zampano; March 18, 1928 New Haven, Connecticut, U.S.
- Died: January 12, 2004 (aged 75) New Haven, Connecticut, U.S.
- Education: Yale University (BA, LLB)

Robert Carmine Zampano (March 18, 1928 – January 12, 2004) was a United States district judge of the United States District Court for the District of Connecticut.

== Education and career ==
Zampano was born in New Haven, Connecticut, on March 18, 1928. He received a Bachelor of Arts degree from Yale University in 1951 and a Bachelor of Laws from Yale Law School in 1954. He was a law clerk for the United States District Court for the District of Connecticut in New Haven from 1954 to 1955. Zampano was then in private practice in New Haven from 1955 to 1957 and in East Haven (where he was a partner at Zampano & Mager) from 1957 to 1961. During this time, Zampano was executive secretary of the Review Division of Connecticut Superior Court (1956–1961); East Haven town counsel (1957–1960); and a judge of the East Haven Court (1959–1961). From 1961 to 1964, Zampano was United States Attorney for the District of Connecticut.

== Federal judicial service ==
Zampano was nominated by President Lyndon B. Johnson on August 4, 1964, to a seat on the United States District Court for the District of Connecticut vacated by Judge Robert P. Anderson. He was confirmed by the United States Senate on August 15, 1964, and received his commission the same day. Zampano became one of the youngest members of the federal bench. He assumed senior status due to a certified disability on June 1, 1977, and retired on April 1, 1994. Zampano then returned to private practice in Connecticut from 1994 to 2004.

== Mediator and arbitrator ==
Zampano was known as a mediator; over the course of his career Zampano mediated an estimated 2,000 federal and state court cases. Among Zampano's most notable cases was the L'Ambiance Plaza disaster of 1987, in which a half-finished apartment complex in Bridgeport collapsed, fatally crushing 27 workers and maiming 16 others. Judge Zampano and Judge Frank S. Meadows of the Connecticut Superior Court mediated the many legal actions arising from the catastrophe and achieved a $41 million settlement by late 1988. Zampano was also one of the mediators in the cases brought by investors against Arthur Andersen arising from the collapse of Colonial Realty Co., the biggest investment-fraud scandal in Connecticut history; the result was a $90 million settlement. After retiring from the bench, Zamano worked with "the short-lived Sta-Fed ADR Inc., a nonprofit state-chartered service for resolving legal disputes." Zampano wrote and lectured on alternative dispute resolution.

== Death ==
Zampano died on January 12, 2004, in New Haven, at age 74, following a brief illness. Zampano was survived by his wife of 53 years, Dorothea Gilbridge Zampano, as well as a son, a daughter, a sister, and four grandchildren.

== Sources ==
Legal offices
Preceded by Robert P. Anderson	Judge of the United States District Court for the District of Connecticut; 1964–1977	Succeeded by T. F. Gilroy Daly
