= Thomas Meskill =

American politician (1928–2007)

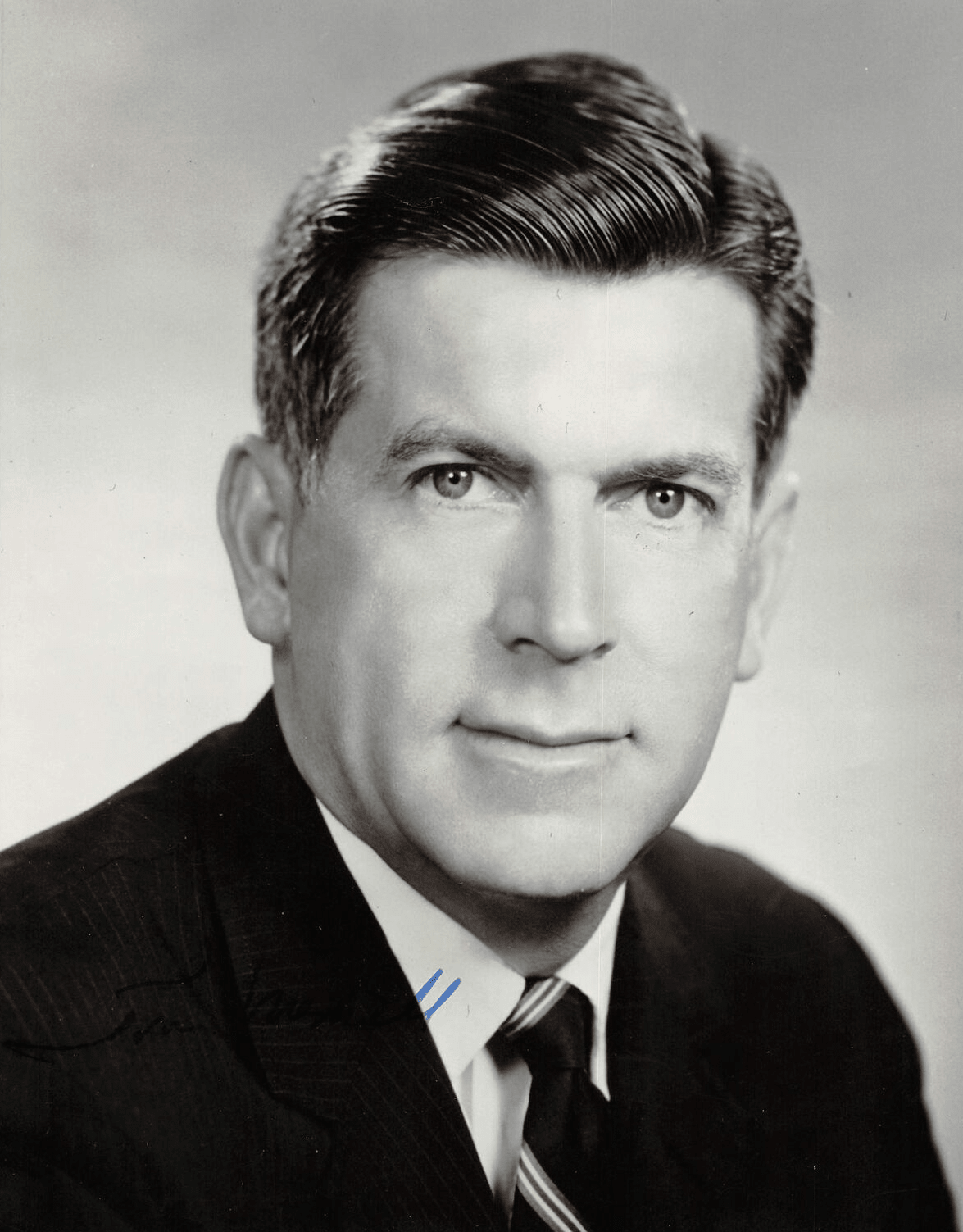

Senior Judge of the United States Court of Appeals for the Second Circuit
- In office June 30, 1993 – October 29, 2007

Chief Judge of the United States Court of Appeals for the Second Circuit
- In office 1992–1993
- Preceded by: James L. Oakes
- Succeeded by: Jon O. Newman

Judge of the United States Court of Appeals for the Second Circuit
- In office April 23, 1975 – June 30, 1993
- Appointed by: Gerald Ford
- Preceded by: J. Joseph Smith
- Succeeded by: Guido Calabresi

82nd Governor of Connecticut
- In office January 6, 1971 – January 8, 1975
- Lieutenant: T. Clark Hull; Peter L. Cashman
- Preceded by: John N. Dempsey
- Succeeded by: Ella Grasso

Member of the U.S. House of Representatives from Connecticut's 6th district
- In office January 3, 1967 – January 3, 1971
- Preceded by: Bernard Grabowski
- Succeeded by: Ella Grasso

Mayor of New Britain, Connecticut
- In office 1962–1964
- Preceded by: Julius J. Kremski
- Succeeded by: James F. Dawson

Personal details
- Born: Thomas Joseph Meskill Jr. January 30, 1928 New Britain, Connecticut, U.S.
- Died: October 29, 2007 (aged 79) Boynton Beach, Florida, U.S.
- Resting place: St. Mary Cemetery, New Britain
- Party: Republican
- Spouse: Mary Grady (m. 1955)
- Children: 5
- Education: Trinity College (BS); University of Connecticut (LLB)

Military service
- Branch/service: United States Air Force
- Years of service: 1950–1953
- Rank: First Lieutenant
- Battles/wars: Korean War

Thomas Joseph Meskill Jr. (January 30, 1928 – October 29, 2007) was a United States circuit judge of the United States Court of Appeals for the Second Circuit. He previously served as the 82nd governor of Connecticut, as a United States representative from Connecticut, and as the mayor of New Britain, Connecticut. He is noted as having served in all three branches of government and at the local, state and federal levels of government during his career of public service. Meskill was the only Republican to serve as Governor of Connecticut from 1955 to 1991.

== Biography ==
Thomas Joseph Meskill was born on January 30, 1928, in New Britain, Connecticut. His father was politically active. Meskill graduated from New Britain High School in 1946. He then attended Bloomfield's St. Thomas Seminary, although his original intention had been to pursue pre-medical studies. He earned a Bachelor of Science degree from Trinity College in Hartford in 1950. After graduation, Meskill enlisted in the United States Air Force and served for three years during the Korean War. He was honorably discharged in 1953 with the rank of first lieutenant. Meskill studied at the New York University School of Law and the University of Connecticut Law School, where he was editor of the Law Review, earning a Bachelor of Laws from the latter institution in 1956, later being admitted to the bar and practicing in New Britain that year.

=== Political career ===
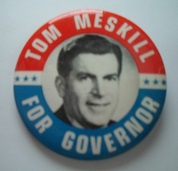
A lapel pin from Meskill's gubernatorial campaign

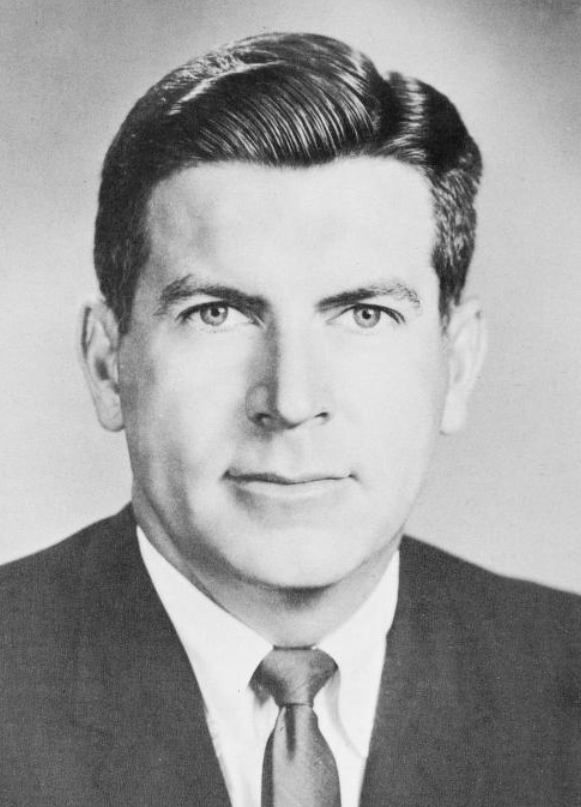
Meskill as a congressman

In 1958, Meskill made a failed bid for the Connecticut Senate. The following year, Meskill ran for the first time for the office of mayor of New Britain, Connecticut, but was defeated by 116 votes. Meskill served for two years as New Britain's assistant corporation counsel starting in 1960. He then won election and served a term as New Britain's mayor from 1962 to 1964. He was defeated for re-election and also failed in an attempt to win a campaign for Congress that same year. He served as New Britain's corporation counsel from 1965 to 1966. During 1965, Meskill was also a member of a state constitutional convention held in Hartford to draft a new Connecticut State Constitution in accordance with a United States Supreme Court ruling. In 1966, amid a Democratic sweep of the state, he was elected on the Republican Party ticket to serve as Representative for Connecticut's 6th congressional district. He served in the 90th and 91st Congresses, from January 3, 1967, to January 3, 1971. In 1970, Meskill ran for and was elected Governor of Connecticut, defeating Democratic Congressman Emilio Q. Daddario 53.76% to 46.23%. Meskill became the first Republican elected to the position since John Davis Lodge in 1950. He served from January 6, 1971, to January 8, 1975. He was the only Republican party nominee to win an election for governor in Connecticut between 1950 and 1994.

During his term as governor, Connecticut went from a budget deficit of $260 million to a surplus of $65 million. He was also involved in the founding of the Connecticut Department of Environmental Protection and of the Connecticut Lottery. In 1974, with the ongoing Watergate scandal in the background and following severe criticism of his not returning from a Vermont skiing trip during a severe ice storm in Connecticut, Meskill decided not to run for re-election.

=== Judicial career ===
On August 8, 1974, President Richard Nixon, in one of the last acts of his presidency, nominated Meskill to serve as a judge of the United States Court of Appeals for the Second Circuit, comprising Connecticut, New York, and Vermont. The nomination proved controversial and was not acted on by the United States Senate that year. On January 16, 1975, President Gerald Ford renominated Meskill to be the 38th judge of the Second Circuit court, succeeding to the seat vacated by Judge J. Joseph Smith (himself a former Member of Congress). The nomination was opposed by many groups including the American Bar Association, which cited Meskill's lack of legal experience. Law professors from Meskill's alma mater, the University of Connecticut, also opposed the nomination stating in a letter to the Senate "it is clear from his record as Governor that he lacks the judicial temperament which might have compensated for his want of experience....As Governor he has repeatedly shown himself insensitive to the rights of the poor and the disadvantaged, and indifferent to civil and political liberties." Nonetheless, Meskill's nomination was confirmed on April 22, 1975, by a 54–36 vote. He was commissioned to his seat the next day. One year later, however, his most ardent critic, Lawrence E. Walsh, who, as President of the American Bar Association had led the opposition to Meskill, publicly admitted his error and called Meskill a "hardworking, able judge." Other organizations that had opposed his appointment would also reverse course by honoring his judicial service. The Connecticut Bar Association awarded Meskill its highest award for judicial service, the Henry J. Naruk Award, in 1994. In that same year, the Federal Bar Council recognized Meskill for his "excellence in federal jurisprudence" by awarding him its Learned Hand Medal. In 1982, the University of Connecticut Law School honored Meskill with its Connecticut Law Review Award, commending him for his "commitment to public service" and for the "intellectual honesty and conviction" that characterized his career.

Meskill remained a judge for the rest of his life. He served as the Second Circuit's Chief Judge from 1992 to 1993. Meskill assumed senior status on June 30, 1993, which he retained until his death some 32 years after he took the bench.

=== Noteworthy cases ===
Meskill participated in many influential rulings during his tenure on the Court, including several adopted by the United States Supreme Court. Among his noteworthy rulings, in Barnes v. Jones (2d Cir. 1981), a criminal case, Meskill disagreed with the majority, stating that appointed counsel should not have to present all non-frivolous arguments requested by his client. The United States Supreme Court agreed with Meskill and reversed the Second Circuit majority, holding that an indigent defendant did not have a constitutional right to compel appointed counsel to press non-frivolous points, where, as a matter of professional judgment, counsel chose not to do so. Meskill's dissenting opinion prevailed in two other Second Circuit cases in which the Supreme Court granted certiorari, Herbert v. Lando (2d Cir. 1977), and Harper & Row Publishers, Inc. v. Nation Enters (2d Cir. 1983). In Herbert, the majority concluded that, in a defamation suit brought by a public figure, the First Amendment affords a privilege to disclosure of a journalist's exercise of editorial control and judgment. Meskill predicted the Supreme Court's rejection of the majority's "new constitutional privilege"; the Supreme Court reversed the Second Circuit, affording no absolute privilege to the editorial process of a media defendant in a libel case. Similarly, in Harper & Row Publishers, the Second Circuit concluded over Meskill's dissent that the publication of verbatim excerpts from former president Ford's unpublished memoir constituted a "fair use" under the Copyright Act, as the excerpts involved important matters of state. The Supreme Court disagreed and again sided with Meskill, concluding that the fact that excerpts were newsworthy did not alone shield the publisher from copyright liability.

== Personal life ==
Meskill married Mary Grady; they had five children.

Meskill died in Boynton Beach, Florida on October 29, 2007, at the age of 79. At the time of his passing, Meskill had homes in Berlin, Connecticut and Delray Beach, Florida. The law library at the University of Connecticut Law School was named after Meskill posthumously.

Party political offices
Preceded by E. Clayton Gengras	Republican nominee for Governor of Connecticut; 1970	Succeeded by Robert H. Steele
U.S. House of Representatives
Preceded by Bernard F. Grabowski	Member of the U.S. House of Representatives from Connecticut's 6th congressional district 1967–1971	Succeeded by Ella T. Grasso
Political offices
Preceded by Julius J. Kremski	Mayor of New Britain, Connecticut; 1962–1964	Succeeded by James F. Dawson
Preceded by John N. Dempsey	Governor of Connecticut; 1971–1975	Succeeded by Ella T. Grasso
Legal offices
Preceded by J. Joseph Smith	Judge of the United States Court of Appeals for the Second Circuit; 1975–1993	Succeeded by Guido Calabresi
Preceded by James L. Oakes	Chief Judge of the United States Court of Appeals for the Second Circuit; 1992–1993	Succeeded by Jon O. Newman
