= 1987 Connecticut's 4th congressional district special election =

- August 18, 1987
- Turnout: 33.6%
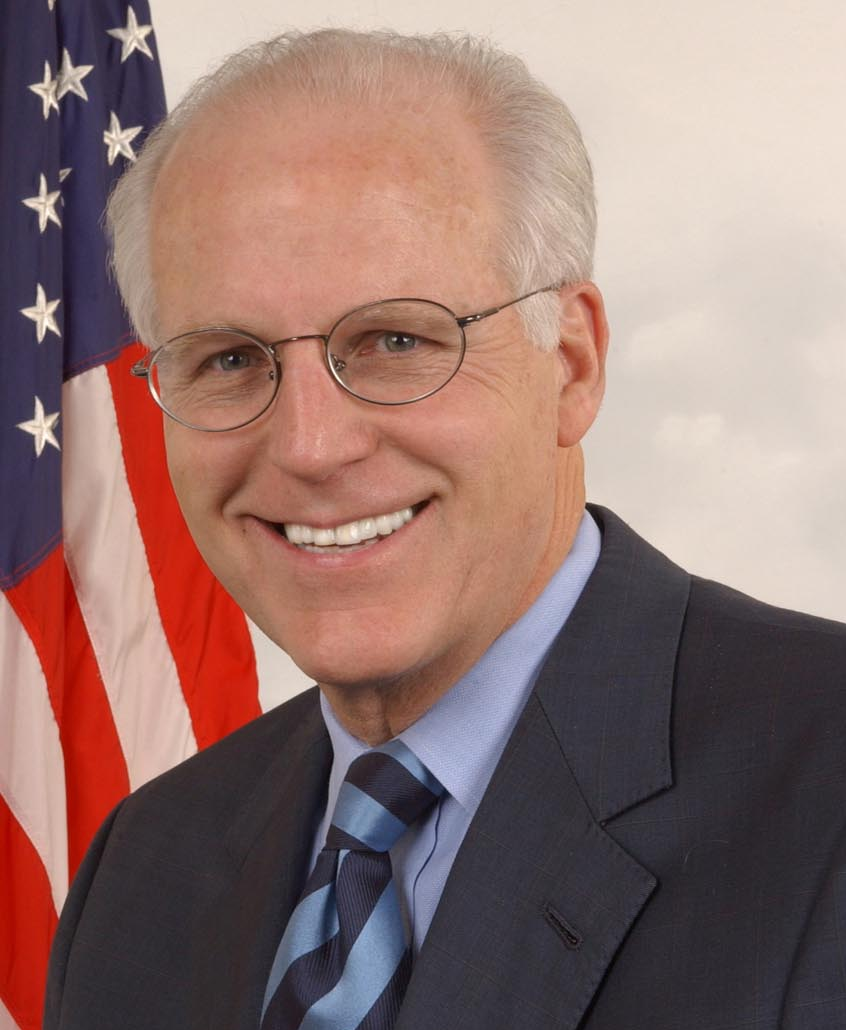

Nominee	Chris Shays	Christine Niedermeier
Party	Republican	Democratic
Popular vote	50,518	37,293
Percentage	57.17%	42.21%
U.S. Representative before election
Stewart McKinney
Republican
Elected U.S. Representative
Chris Shays
Republican

A special election was held on August 18, 1987 to determine the next member of the United States House of Representatives for Connecticut's 4th congressional district. The election was held to complete the unexpired term of Stewart McKinney, who died on May 7, 1987.

Chris Shays, a State Representative from Stamford, beat Democratic opponent Christine Niedermeier, the nominee for this district in 1986 and a former State Representative from Fairfield.

Shays would go on to represent the district until eventually losing re-election to Jim Himes in 2008.

== Republican primary ==
State representative Ralph E. Van Norstrand, who was widely considered the front-runner early on in the race, dropped out on June 4 for personal reasons. Fellow state representative William H. Nickerson attempted to contest the convention, but dropped out on June 27 after it became apparent that most of the delegates from his home town of Greenwich supported businessman John T. Becker.

The Republican convention was held on June 29 inside the Norwalk High School auditorium. There were 124 delegates to the convention in total. In order to win the party endorsement, a majority was needed, or 63 votes. To be able to force a primary, it required 20%, or 25 votes on any ballot.

The official vote for the first ballot was 51 for Rich, 34 for Becker, 21 for Shays, and 18 for Metsopoulos. On the second roll call, Rich's support rose to 52, Becker received 35, Shays declined to 20, and Metsopoulos garnered 17 votes. Shays' candidacy appeared in jeopardy. Then, in the pivotal move of the convention, Fairfield First Selectman Jacquelyn Durrell, a delegate who had voted as part of the unanimous Fairfield bloc for Metsopoulos, switched her vote to Shays. This move was quickly imitated by three other Fairfield delegates, and Shays suddenly had 24 votes, one short of the 25 threshold needed to force a primary. Then, Eleanor Yudain, a delegate from Stamford announced she was switching her vote from Becker to Shays "to allow a good friend a chance at a primary", giving Shays the threshold needed to contest a primary. On the third ballot, the Fairfield delegation unanimously stuck to Metsopoulos, and along with defections from Becker, it allowed him to garner 35 votes, reaching well above the threshold to enter the primary. Rich received 53, and both Becker and Shays garnerned 18. At the end of the third ballot, the convention adjourned, with four candidates advancing to the July 21 primary.

=== Candidates ===
==== Nominee ====
- Chris Shays, state representative for the 147th district from Stamford.

==== Eliminated in primary ====
- John T. Becker, Greenwich businessman and nominee for state treasurer in 1982.
- Frank D. Rich Jr., Darien developer.
- John G. Metsopoulos, state representative for the 132nd district from Fairfield.

==== Withdrew ====
- Ralph E. Van Norstrand, state representative for the 141st district and former Speaker of the state house from Darien.
- William H. Nickerson, state representative for the 149th district from Greenwich. (Endorsed Becker)
- Paul Giusti, Fairfield businessman.

==== Disqualified ====
- Richard H. G. Cunningham, former state Representative for the 148th district (1985-1987) and state Senator for the 27th district (1979-1981) from Stamford.

==== Declined ====
- Julie Belaga, former state representative for the 136th district from Westport (1977–1987) and nominee for governor in 1986. (Endorsed Shays)
- Emil Benvenuto, state representative for the 151st district from Greenwich.

=== Convention ===
Republican convention, June 29
Candidate	Round 1		Round 2		Round 3	
Candidate	Votes	%	Votes	%	Votes	%
Frank D. Rich Jr.	51	41.1%	52	41.9%	53	42.8%
John Metsopoulos	18	14.5%	13	10.5%	35	28.2%
John Becker	34	27.4%	34	27.4%	18	14.5%
Chris Shays	21	17.0%	25	20.2%	18	14.5%
Inactive Ballots	0 ballots		0 ballots		0 ballots	

=== Results ===
July 21, 1987 Republican primary
Party	Candidate	Votes	%
Republican	Chris Shays	11,142	38.50%
Republican	John T. Becker	7,740	26.74%
Republican	Frank D. Rich Jr.	7,185	24.82%
Republican	John G. Metsopoulos	2,876	9.94%
Total votes		28,943	100.00%

== Democratic primary ==
=== Candidates ===
==== Nominee ====
- Christine Niedermeier, former state representative for the 134th district from Fairfield and nominee for this district in 1986.

==== Eliminated in primary ====
- Margaret E. Morton, state senator for the 23rd district from Bridgeport.
- Michael G. Morgan, chairman of the Stamford Board of Finance and nominee for this district in 1978.

==== Withdrew ====
- William A. Collins, Mayor of Norwalk.

=== Convention ===
Democratic convention, June 30
Candidate	Round 1	
Candidate	Votes	%
Margaret E. Morton	80	38.65%
Christine Niedermeier	71	34.30%
Michael G. Morgan	56	27.05%
Inactive Ballots	0 ballots	

=== Results ===
July 21, 1987 Democratic primary
Party	Candidate	Votes	%
Democratic	Christine Niedermeier	13,422	52.60%
Democratic	Margaret E. Morton	7,143	27.99%
Democratic	Michael G. Morgan	4,954	19.41%
Total votes		25,519	100.00%

== General election ==
=== Results ===
Connecticut's Fourth Congressional District special election, 1987
Party	Candidate	Votes	%
Republican	Chris Shays	50,518	57.17%
Democratic	Christine Niedermeier	37,293	42.21%
War Against AIDS	Nicholas J. Tarzia	524	0.59%
Write-in		28	0.03%
Total votes		88,363	100.00%
Republican hold			
