= Droney =

Droney is an Irish surname, derived from the Gaelic Ó Dróna, and originating from county Clare. Outside of Ireland, it's also prevalent in the U.S. An alternative theory says it is derived from the Middle English word drane, meaning drone, as in a male bee, and traces its origins to Yorkshire.

Notable people with this surname include:

- Christopher F. Droney (born 1954), American judge
- John Droney, American politician
- Daithí Ó Drónaí (born 1990), sometimes anglicised as Droney, Irish musician
- Christopher droney (born 1924, died 2020) the concertinist from Bellharbour, County Clare, Ireland
- Francis Droney (born 1927, died 1925) a firefighter for the West Hartford Fire Department and war veteran from Bellharbour, County Clare, Ireland
