= Paoletta =

Paoletta is both an Italian surname and a given name. Notable people with the name include:

- Jessica Paoletta (born 1988), Italian sprinter
- Leonard S. Paoletta (born 1934), American lawyer and former mayor of Bridgeport, Connecticut
- Mark Paoletta, American attorney and former government official
- Paoletta Magoni (born 1964), Italian alpine skier
