= Thomas W. Bucci =

American lawyer

Thomas Bucci

49th Mayor of Bridgeport, Connecticut
- In office 1985 – November 13, 1989
- Preceded by: Leonard S. Paoletta
- Succeeded by: Mary C. Moran

Personal details
- Born: Thomas William Bucci; April 17, 1948 (age 78) Bridgeport, Connecticut
- Party: Democratic
- Spouse: Karen M. Flanagan
- Children: 2
- Education: Sacred Heart University (BA); University of Connecticut (JD)

Thomas William Bucci (born April 17, 1948) is an American lawyer and former mayor of Bridgeport, Connecticut. A member of the Democratic Party, Bucci ran in 1985 and defeated incumbent mayor Leonard S. Paoletta flipping Bridgeport's leadership from Republican to Democratic. Bucci served two terms in office until he was defeated and succeeded by Mary C. Moran thus returning Bridgeport back to Republican leadership.

Bucci is also known for successfully arguing the civil rights case Connecticut v. Teal in front of the Supreme Court of the United States.

== Family and personal life ==
Bucci is the cousin of Bridgeport Democratic Town Committee Chairman Mario Testa. Bucci has two children and nine grandchildren.

== Education and Legal career ==
Bucci graduated from Notre Dame Catholic High School (Connecticut). He subsequently obtained a Bachelor of Arts from Sacred Heart University in 1969 and a juris doctor from University of Connecticut School of Law in 1973. Bucci graduated cum laude from the University of Connecticut School of Law.

Bucci was admitted to the bar in Connecticut in 1973 and is also licensed to practice before the U.S. District Court for the District of Connecticut, the U.S. Court of Appeals for the Second Circuit, and the U.S. Supreme Court. Bucci is a current member and former president of the Greater Bridgeport Bar Association and a current member of the Connecticut Bar Association and American Bar Association.

Bucci is a founding partner of the law firm of Willinger, Willinger & Bucci, P.C. He argued before the U.S. Supreme Court in the civil rights case of Connecticut v. Teal that dealt with Title VII of the Civil Rights Act of 1964. Ultimately, the Supreme Court of the United States sided with Bucci and declared that the State Of Connecticut engaged in behavior that had a discriminatory impact against African Americans. Other notable cases include his defense of Dr. Moshe Gai, a professor who was fired from the University of Connecticut.

== Mayor of Bridgeport ==
After serving as Assistant Corporation Counsel for the City of Bridgeport, Bucci was twice elected mayor of Bridgeport and served out both terms.

=== Elections ===
In 1985, Bucci won a four-way Democratic primary for mayor getting 8,737 of the votes, defeating 1983 Democratic mayoral candidate Charles B. Tisdale who got 7,146 votes, City Clerk Leonard L. Crone who got 1,862 votes, and former mayor John C. Mandanici who got 798 votes. Bucci then unseated incumbent mayor Leonard S. Paoletta, the Republican nominee, in the general election and became mayor.

In 1987, Bucci won the Democratic primary with 6,155 votes, defeating State Representative Robert T. Keeley Jr who had 2,251 votes. He subsequently won the general election and remained mayor.

In 1989, Bucci ran for a third term and won the Democratic primary. In the general election, he was challenged by the Republican nominee, Mary Moran. Bucci raised $280,000, while Moran raised $78,000. Moran criticized Bucci for the city's chronic financial problems and high crime rate. Bucci responded that most of the city's financial problems were due to previous Republican administrations. Bucci was noted for his role in Bridgeport receiving a bailout package of $60 million in state-backed bonds during his tenure. Bucci attacked his opponent for being a "pro-developer candidate who would allow condominiums to be built throughout the city". Bucci claimed to have strong support from the city's African American and Hispanic voters, while his opponent was noted for having support from the "predominately white sections of the city". Since Democrats outnumber Republicans by a 4-to-1 ratio in Bridgeport, Bucci's victory seemed inevitable. Ultimately, Moran defeated incumbent mayor Bucci by a margin of 54% vs. 40%, with 6% going to minor candidates. Upon his defeat, Bucci proclaimed "We've been through a difficult period of time the past two years," and "I love this city, and I've loved being mayor of this city. The voters have spoken. They have decided they want a change." Bucci's defeat shocked observers and was understood to be a dissatisfaction towards Bucci rather than an acceptance of his opponent's policies who called for "cutting city services, except for police and fire" and not increasing taxes except during a municipal bankruptcy.

=== "Armpit of New England" ===
In 1987, Money magazine ranked Bridgeport as the nation's 37th-best place to live. In response, newspaper columnist Mike Levine of Middletown, New York—which had come in 38th—repeated a slur in his column (attributed to Paul Newman) that Bridgeport is "the armpit of New England."

=== City's budget woes ===
In April 1988, the city experienced a $24.4 million budget deficit, and Bucci proposed an 18-19% tax increase in an attempt to help the city with its financial straits.

In 1988, the City of Bridgeport agreed to let the State of Connecticut monitor city finances in exchange for a "bailout" of $58.3 million in state-backed bonds for deficit relief.

==== Aftermath ====
On June 6, 1991, the City of Bridgeport (then under Bucci's successor, Mayor Mary Moran) filed a Chapter 9 petition (municipal bankruptcy) in U.S. bankruptcy court. The city faced a $12 million gap in its fiscal year 1991-92 budget of $304 million. The Bridgeport Financial Review Board immediately passed a resolution blocking the city from seeking bankruptcy protection and adopted a $319 budget for the city, ordering an 18% increase in property taxes. Bucci warned at the time that steep declines in property values could occur in the city.

=== Census of 1990 ===
Bucci was mayor during the 1990 United States census, where he sought to ensure that the homeless were included in the count.

=== L'Ambiance Plaza disaster ===
At approximately 1:30 p.m. on April 23, 1987, 28 construction workers were killed when the sixteen storey L'Ambiance Plaza building project collapsed. Bucci was quoted as saying "It's a sight out of Beirut, Lebanon."
