= Mary C. Moran =

American politician (1933–2024)

Mary Moran

50th Mayor of Bridgeport, Connecticut
- In office November 13, 1989 – November 11, 1991
- Preceded by: Thomas W. Bucci
- Succeeded by: Joseph Ganim

Personal details
- Born: August 1, 1933 Bridgeport, Connecticut, U.S.
- Died: July 10, 2024 (aged 90)
- Party: Republican

Mary Chapar Moran (August 1, 1933 – July 10, 2024) was an American politician who served as mayor of Bridgeport, Connecticut from 1989 to 1991. She is the first and only woman to be mayor of Bridgeport to date. A member of the Republican Party, Moran ran in 1989 and defeated incumbent mayor Thomas W. Bucci flipping Bridgeport's leadership from Democrat to Republican. Her victory was considered an upset as Bridgeport was heavily Democratic. She served for one term, before being defeated by Joe Ganim thus returning Bridgeport back to Democratic leadership. Her tenure was extremely unpopular exclusively due to her decision to file for municipal bankruptcy for the City Of Bridgeport, which the U.S. bankruptcy court ultimately rejected.

Moran died on July 10, 2024, at the age of 90.

== Electoral history ==
In 1977, Moran unsuccessfully sought the Republican nomination for city clerk.

In 1989, Moran–then "a self-described housewife and real-estate broker" without experience in public office—won the Republican nomination for mayor in an upset, narrowly defeating the party-endorsed candidate, former mayor Leonard S. Paoletta, with 2,004 votes (50.4%) to Paoletta's 1,972 votes (49.6%). Moran proceeded to defeat two-term incumbent mayor Thomas W. Bucci. She received support mainly from white voters, and argued that under Bucci crime went up as and financial issues became worse. Moran was a Republican nominee in a heavily Democratic city, yet won the election by 11 percentage points. Moran was sworn in at the Klein Memorial Auditorium on November 13, 1989. Her victory was considered an upset by observers and was understood to be a rejection of Bucci rather than an acceptance of her policies which called for "cutting city services, except for police and fire" and not increasing taxes except during a potential municipal bankruptcy.

== Mayor of Bridgeport ==
In 1988, the year prior to her election, the State of Connecticut had imposed a financial review board for the city.

In 1991, Moran became famous for filing a municipal bankruptcy petition for the city in U.S. bankruptcy court in an effort to avoid an 18 percent tax that the financial review board had proposed. The petition was unsuccessful; the bankruptcy court determined that Bridgeport was not insolvent.

Moran's move was deeply unpopular, even vilified. The filing "made Connecticut's largest city a symbol of the nation's urban struggles." In a 2012 op-ed, Moran defended the decision as the only way to address Bridgeport's steep structural budget deficits.

Moran lost the 1991 election to Joseph P. Ganim. Ganim received 15,768 votes (54%) compared to 10,951 for Moran and 2,258 for other candidates.
