= John M. Fabrizi =

American mayor

John Fabrizi

52nd Mayor of Bridgeport, Connecticut
- In office April 4, 2003 – December 1, 2007
- Preceded by: Joe Ganim
- Succeeded by: Bill Finch

Personal details
- Born: December 25, 1956 (age 69) United States
- Party: Democratic

John Michael Fabrizi (born December 25, 1956) is a former mayor of Bridgeport, Connecticut, succeeded by Bill Finch. He is a member of the U.S. Democratic Party.

== Career ==
Fabrizi holds degrees from Southern Connecticut State University as well as the University of Bridgeport and has served in numerous public service capacities. He was the assistant director of Bridgeport's adult education program and was also a teacher of fifth and sixth graders. He was first elected to public office, the Bridgeport Civil Service Administration, in 1983.

In 1992, Fabrizi was elected to the Bridgeport Democratic Town Committee and in 1996, he was elected to the Democratic State Central Committee of Connecticut. In 1997, he was elected to the Bridgeport City Council. He became the mayor of Bridgeport in 2003, after the previous mayor, Joseph P. Ganim, was sentenced to nine years in a federal prison for corruption charges. As mayor, Fabrizi was a member of the Mayors Against Illegal Guns Coalition, an organization formed in 2006 and co-chaired by New York City mayor Michael Bloomberg and Boston mayor Thomas Menino.

== Cocaine and alcohol use ==
On June 20, 2006, Fabrizi admitted to cocaine and alcohol abuse while serving as mayor. Before admitting to drug use, the Federal Bureau of Investigation received a tip from Shawn Fardy, a Bridgeport Democratic Town Committee member, that he possessed a videotape of Fabrizi using cocaine. The information surfaced during an investigation into a drug ring led by Juan Marrero, a Bridgeport business owner. Fardy was sentenced to "no more than 27 months in prison" as a result of his arrest.

On May 9, 2007, Fabrizi announced he would not seek re-election, but served on the Democratic State Central Committee of Connecticut for the 2008-2010 term. More recently, Fabrizi was a supporter of Bridgeport's Mayor Bill Finch.

== Electoral history ==
Bridgeport Mayoral General Election, 2003
Party	Candidate	Votes	%
Democratic	John Michael Fabrizi	4,240	34.50%
Democratic	Christopher L. Caruso	3,937	32.04%
Democratic	Maximino Medina, Jr.	2,410	19.61%
Democratic	Robert T. "Bob" Keeley Jr.	1,030	8.38%
Democratic	John D. Guman, III	433	3.52%
Democratic	Charles Coviello, Jr.	239	1.95%

Bridgeport Mayoral General Election, 2003
Party	Candidate	Votes	%
Democratic	John Michael Fabrizi	11,816	58.87%
Republican	Enrique "Rick" Torres	8,255	41.13%
