= Dick Durrell =

American publisher (1925–2008)

Richard J. "Dick" Durrell (ca. 1925 – March 7, 2008) was an American advertising executive and one of the founding staff members for People magazine.

Durrell turned down an offer to play baseball for the Brooklyn Dodgers franchise in order to attend the University of Minnesota, from which he graduated in 1948.

For most of his career, he worked for Time Inc., retiring in 1983. In his retirement years, he occasionally taught a course titled "Magazine Publication and Related Communications" at Sacred Heart University in Fairfield, Connecticut.

He was married to Jacquelyn Durrell, a former Connecticut State Representative and First Selectman of Fairfield.
