= Nicholas Panuzio =

American politician (1935–2019)

46th Mayor of Bridgeport, Connecticut
- In office 1971–1975
- Preceded by: Hugh Curran
- Succeeded by: William Seres (interim), John C. Mandanici

Member of the Connecticut House of Representatives from the 134th district
- In office January 6, 1971 – December 14, 1971
- Preceded by: Agnes Giannini
- Succeeded by: Richard W. Pinto

Personal details
- Born: October 28, 1935 Bridgeport, Connecticut
- Died: May 3, 2019 (aged 83) Easton, Maryland
- Party: Republican
- Spouse(s): June Panuzio (divorced), Gretchen Panuzio
- Children: 3
- Education: University of Bridgeport

Nicholas A. Panuzio (October 28, 1935 – May 3, 2019) was an American politician who was Mayor of Bridgeport from 1971 to 1975.

== Early life and career ==
He was born in Bridgeport, Connecticut, the son of Nicholas and Carmela (née Petrucelli) Panuzio. He graduated from Bridgeport Central High School and later earned his bachelor's degree from the University of Bridgeport. Following graduation, he became an assistant dean of admissions at the college, and later worked his way up to becoming the university's administrator.

After a stint in the Connecticut House of Representatives, Panuzio ran for mayor in 1969, losing to incumbent Hugh Curran in a landslide. Two years later, he beat Curran in a rematch by a very narrow margin - just nine votes. He was the first Republican elected mayor in Bridgeport since William Behrens in 1929.

He ran for governor in 1974, but lost the Republican primary to Representative Robert Steele, who would later lose the general election to Representative Ella Grasso.

Panuzio later served in the Presidential administration of Gerald Ford as Commissioner of Public Buildings for the General Services Administration. He also served as Chair of the Talbot County Republican Party from 2009 until he stepped down in February 2019.
