= 2023–24 Bridgeport, Connecticut mayoral election =

2023-24 Bridgeport, Connecticut mayoral election
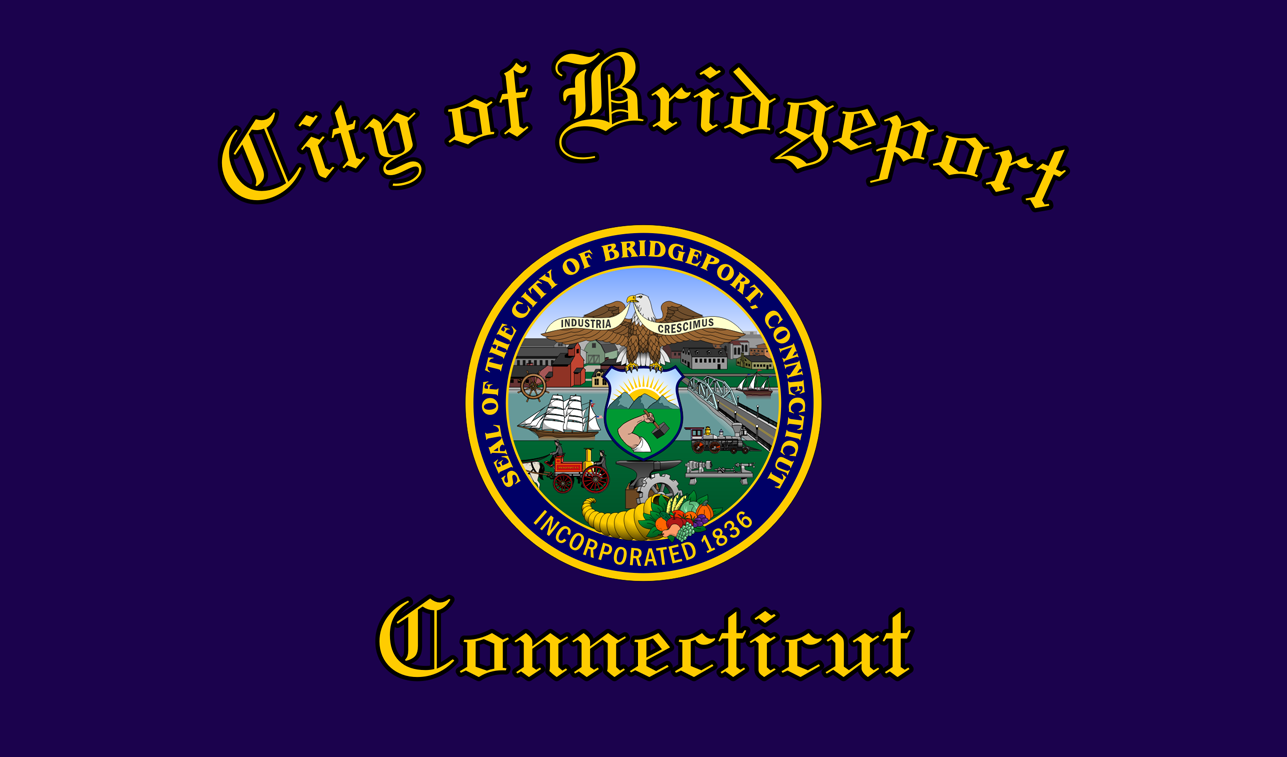
- November 7, 2023 (initial); February 27, 2024 (redo)
- Turnout: 19.98% ▼ (initial); 15.41% ▼ (redo)
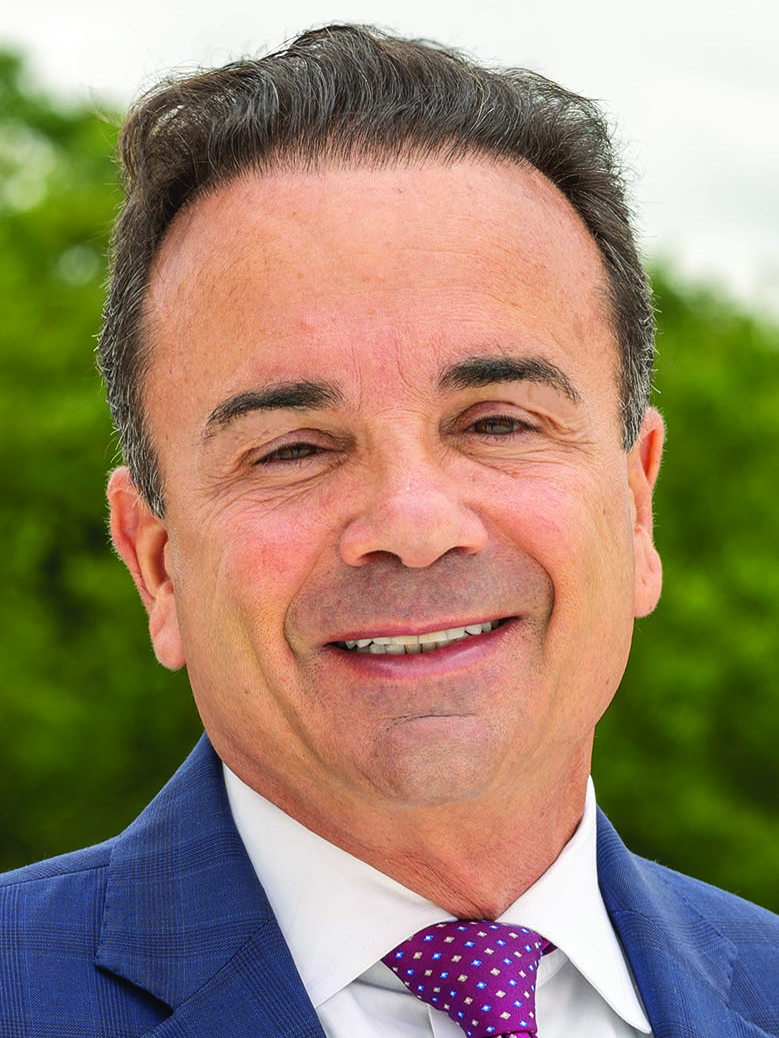

Candidate	Joseph Ganim	John Gomes
Party	Democratic	Independent Party
Initial	5,729; 41.28%	5,550; 39.99%
Redo	6,366; 58.65%	4,131; 38.06%
Candidate	Lamond Daniels	David Herz
Party	Independent	Republican
Initial	1,836; 13.23%	765; 5.51%
Redo	Withdrawn	357; 3.29%
- Ganim: 50–60% 60–70% 70–80% Gomes: 50–60% 60–70% Tie: 50% Ganim: 40–50% 50–60% 60–70% 70–80% Gomes: 40–50% 50–60% Tie: 40-50% Ganim: 50–60% 60–70% 70–80% Gomes: 50–60% 60–70% Tie: 50% Ganim: 40–50% 50–60% 60–70% 70–80% Gomes: 40–50% 50–60%
Mayor before election
Joseph Ganim
Democratic
Elected mayor
Joseph Ganim
Democratic

Bridgeport, Connecticut, held an election for mayor in 2023 and 2024. The original general election was held on November 7, 2023, with incumbent Joseph Ganim winning re-election. However, a state judge struck down the results of the September 12 Democratic primary due to evidence of election fraud and ordered a new primary scheduled for January 23, 2024. Ganim won this primary and was re-elected as mayor on February 27, 2024.

== Initial election ==
=== Democratic primary ===
Primaries were held on September 12. Democratic incumbent Joseph Ganim narrowly won re-nomination over his former aide, John Gomes. Gomes had won the votes cast on election day, but his lead was surmounted by Ganim once absentee ballots were counted.

Democratic primary election results
Party	Candidate	Votes	%
Democratic	Joseph Ganim (incumbent)	4,260	52.13%
Democratic	John Gomes	3,912	47.87%
Total votes		8,172	100.00%

Gomes declined to concede and alleged that Ganim's campaign had committed voter fraud. Bridgeport police launched an investigation regarding claims of "possible misconduct" after a video surfaced online of two women putting white envelopes in an absentee ballot drop-off box. Gomes then released a video on social media that allegedly contained security footage of Wanda Geter-Pataky, a Ganim ally, stuffing an absentee ballot drop-box. Additionally Gomes filed a lawsuit challenging his loss.

On November 1, 2023, a Connecticut Superior Court judge upheld Gomes' challenge and struck down the results of the Democratic primary, finding that 1,253 absentee ballots were submitted at Bridgeport drop boxes, despite surveillance videos only showing 420 people using the boxes. A new Democratic primary was ordered, but the general election was still held on November 7th.

== First general election ==
Despite his loss in the Democratic primary, John Gomes won the nomination of the Independent Party of Connecticut and secured a place on the general election ballot against Ganim. They were joined on the ballot by Republican David Herz, and petitioning candidate Lamond Daniels, a Democrat who failed to make the primary ballot. If Gomes had won, his attorney said they would withdraw the legal complaint, which would make the redo primary unnecessary. However, this did not occur as Ganim narrowly won the election.

First general election results
Party	Candidate	Votes	%
Democratic	Joseph Ganim (incumbent)	5,729	41.3%
Independent Party	John Gomes	5,550	40.0%
Independent	Lamond Daniels	1,836	13.2%
Republican	David Herz	765	5.5%
Total votes		13,880	100.0%

== Second Democratic primary ==
The court-ordered second Democratic primary was held on January 23, 2024, with Ganim and Gomes facing off for the third consecutive time. Ganim won this primary by a wider margin than the initial primary, and won a majority of both in-person and absentee ballots. Ganim could still run under the New Movement Party and Gomes could still run under the Independent Party if either lost the second primary.

Democratic primary election results
Party	Candidate	Votes	%
Democratic	Joseph Ganim (incumbent)	4,971	56.07%
Democratic	John Gomes	3,894	43.93%
Total votes		8,865	100.00%

== Second general election ==
Because Gomes had qualified as an independent candidate, a new general election was slated for February 27, 2024, unless all remaining candidates running against Ganim had withdrawn from the ballot by that date. Prior to the election, petitioning candidate Lamond Daniels withdrew, endorsing Ganim. Ganim easily prevailed over Gomes in the second general election, and was re-elected.

Second general election results
Party	Candidate	Votes	%
Democratic	Joseph Ganim (incumbent)	6,366	58.7%
Independent Party	John Gomes	4,131	38.1%
Republican	David Herz	357	3.3%
Total votes		10,854	100.0%
