= Jacquelyn Durrell =

American politician (died 2009)

Member of the Connecticut House of Representatives from the 134th district
- In office 1977–1979
- Preceded by: Robert W. Sherwood
- Succeeded by: Christine Niedermeier

Personal details
- Born: Jacquelyn Carmen Dow; 1927 or 1928 Sioux City, Iowa, U.S.
- Died: February 2, 2009 (aged 81) Fairfield, Connecticut, U.S.
- Party: Republican
- Spouse: Dick Durrell
- Education: University of Minnesota

Jacquelyn Carmen Durrell (died February 2, 2009) was an American politician who served in the Connecticut House of Representatives from 1977 to 1979, representing the 134th district as a Republican.

== Career ==
Durrell was born Jacquelyn Carmen Dow in Sioux City, Iowa, and grew up in Minneapolis, Minnesota, where she would later attend the University of Minnesota. In 1949, she married Dick Durrell, who would later become the founding publisher of People, and in 1959, they moved to Fairfield, Connecticut.

Durrell was elected to the Connecticut House of Representatives in 1976 and served one term representing the 134th district as a Republican. She ran for a second term in 1978, but was defeated by Democratic candidate Christine Niedermeier.

Following her service in the House of Representatives, Durrell remained active in local politics. In 1981, she became the first woman elected to the Fairfield Board of Selectmen. She became first selectman in 1983 and served for five terms. She left the position in 1993, commenting "I feel I can step down now because I have accomplished everything I set out to do when I took office".

Durrell died on February 2, 2009, in Fairfield. She was 81.
