= Lee Goldstein =

American politician

Member-elect of the Connecticut House of Representatives from the 136th district
- Assuming office January 2027
- Succeeding: Jonathan Steinberg

Personal details
- Party: Democratic
- Website: Campaign website

Lee Goldstein is an American politician. A member of the Democratic Party, she is the member-elect for the 136th district of the Connecticut House of Representatives. She was elected at the 2026 election. She was the Chair of the Westport Board of Education.

== Personal life ==
She is Jewish.
