= Laura Devlin =

American politician (born 1960)

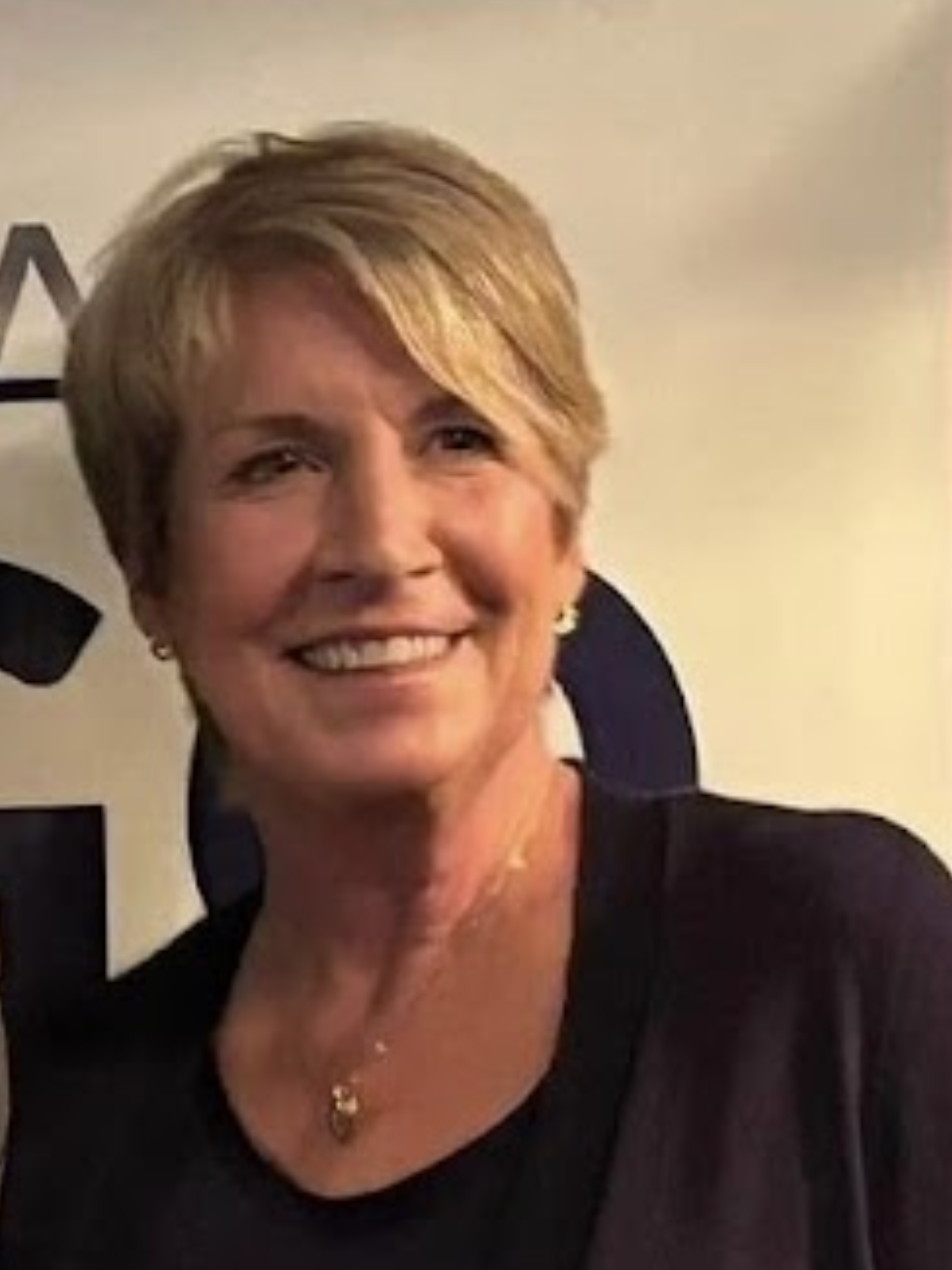
- Devlin in 2024

Member of the Connecticut House of Representatives from the 134th district
- In office January 7, 2015 – January 4, 2023
- Preceded by: Tony Hwang
- Succeeded by: Sarah Keitt

Personal details
- Born: April 13, 1960 (age 66)
- Party: Republican
- Education: University of Illinois, Urbana-Champaign (BA); Rutgers University, New Brunswick

Laura Devlin (born April 13, 1960) is an American politician who represented Connecticut's 134th House of Representatives district from 2015 to 2023. In the 2022 Connecticut gubernatorial election, she was the Republican nominee for Lieutenant Governor, running alongside the Republican nominee for Governor Bob Stefanowski.

Party political offices
Preceded by Joe Markley	Republican nominee for Lieutenant Governor of Connecticut; 2022	Most recent
