= Sidney Postol =

American businessman and politician (1918–2014)

Member of the Connecticut House of Representatives from the 134th district
- In office 1987–1989
- Preceded by: Christine Niedermeier
- Succeeded by: Daniel Caruso

Personal details
- Party: Democratic

Sidney Postol (1918 – April 28, 2014) was an American businessman and politician.

Born in Bridgeport, Connecticut, Postol served in the United States Army during World War II in Europe. Postol received his bachelor's degree from Yale College, went to Harvard Law School, Harvard Graduate School, and the Yale Labor and Management Center. He worked in the lumber business and in transportation. Postol served in local government including town government and board of education in Fairfield, Connecticut. In 1987, Postol served in the Connecticut House of Representatives as a Democrat. He died in Fairfield, Connecticut.
