= 2015 Bridgeport, Connecticut, mayoral election =

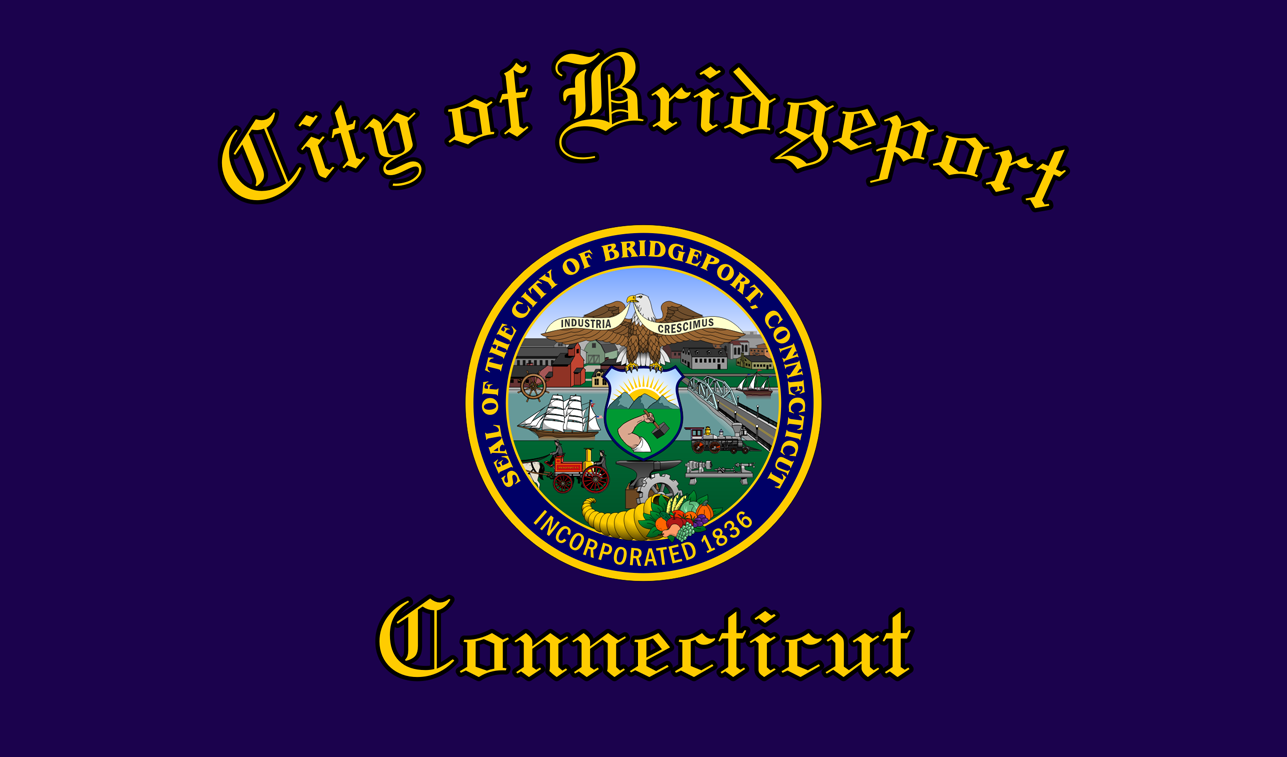
- November 3, 2015
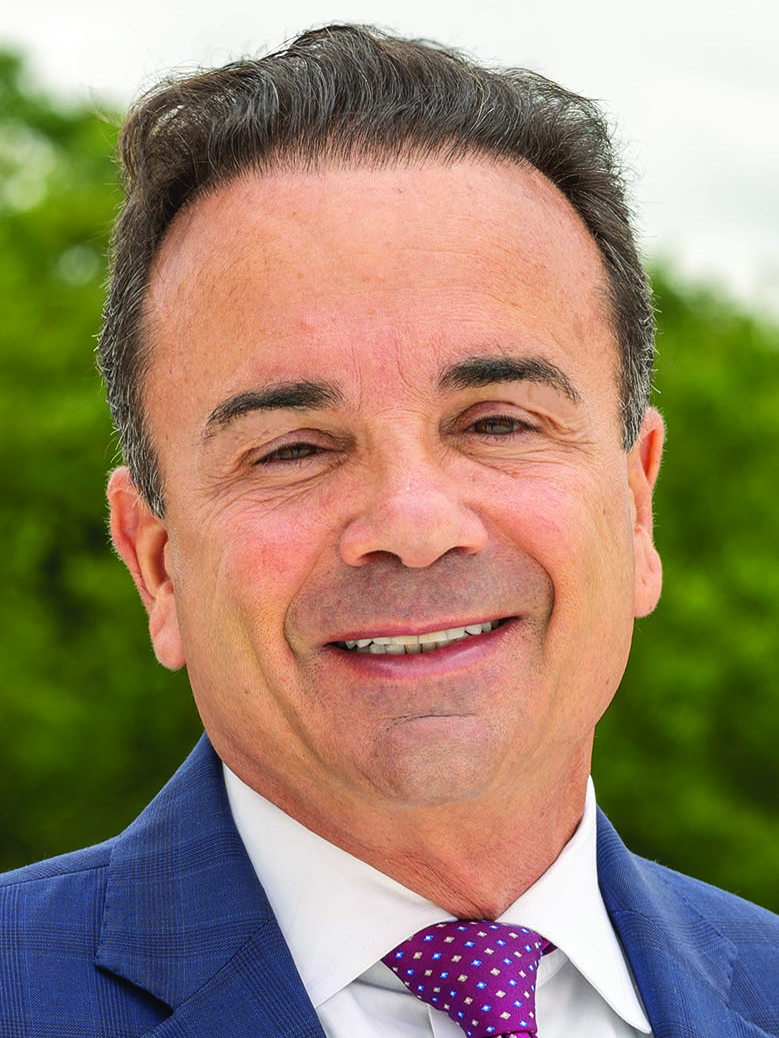

Candidate	Joseph Ganim	Mary Jane Foster	Enrique "Rick" Torres
Party	Democratic	Independent	Republican
Popular vote	11,198	6,029	2,838
Percentage	55.38%	29.81%	14.03%
Mayor before election
Bill Finch
Democratic
Elected mayor
Joseph Ganim
Democratic

Bridgeport, Connecticut, held an election for mayor on November 3, 2015. It saw former mayor Joseph Ganim return to the office. Ganim defeated incumbent mayor Bill Finch in the Democratic primary.

== Democratic primary ==
The Democratic primary was held on September 16.

Heading into the election Ganim, a former mayor who had served jail time related to federal corruption charges, was seen as an underdog.

Democratic primary election results
Party	Candidate	Votes	%
Democratic	Joseph P. Ganim	6,264	51.67%
Democratic	Bill Finch (incumbent)	5,859	48.33%
Total votes		12,123	

== General election ==
General election results
Party	Candidate	Votes	%
Democratic	Joseph P. Ganim	11,198	55.38%
Independent	Mary Jane Foster	6,029	29.81%
Republican	Enrique "Rick" Torres	2,838	14.03%
Independent	David Daniels III	504	2.49%
New Movement	Charles J. Coviello, Jr.	72	0.36%
Independent	Christopher J. Taylor	61	0.30%
Independent	Tony Barr	24	0.12%
Total votes		20,222	
