= Connecticut's 134th House of Representatives district =

American legislative district

Connecticut's 134th State House of Representatives district
Representative
Sarah Keitt; D

Connecticut's 134th House of Representatives district elects one member of the Connecticut House of Representatives. It encompasses parts of Fairfield and Trumbull and has been represented by Democrat Sarah Keitt since 2023.

== List of representatives ==
Representative	Party	Years	District home	Note
Robert J. "Bob" Testo	Democratic	1967 – 1969	Bridgeport	
Agnes Giannini	Democratic	1969 – 1971	Bridgeport	
Nicholas Panuzio	Republican	1971	Bridgeport	Later served as Mayor of Bridgeport
Richard W. Pinto	Democratic	1972 – 1973	Bridgeport	
Harry W. Wenz	Republican	1973 – 1975	Fairfield	Redistricted from the 141st District
Robert W. Sherwood	Democratic	1975 – 1977	Fairfield	
Jacquelyn Durrell	Republican	1977 – 1979	Fairfield	
Christine Niedermeier	Democratic	1979 – 1987	Fairfield	
Sidney Postol	Democratic	1987 – 1989	Fairfield	
Daniel F. "Dan" Caruso	Republican	1989 – 1995	Fairfield	
John E. "Jack" Stone Jr.	Republican	1995 – 2007	Fairfield	
Tom Christiano	Democratic	2007 – 2009	Trumbull	
Tony Hwang	Republican	2009 – 2015	Fairfield	Later served as a State Senator
Laura Devlin	Republican	2015 – 2023	Fairfield	Unsuccessfully ran for Lieutenant Governor
Sarah Keitt	Democratic	2023 – present	Fairfield	

== Recent elections ==
=== 2020 ===
2020 Connecticut State House of Representatives election, District 134
Party	Candidate	Votes	%
Republican	Laura Devlin (incumbent)	7,344	52.04
Democratic	Carla Volpe	6,413	45.44
Independent Party	Carla Volpe	226	1.60
Working Families	Carla Volpe	130	0.92
Total votes		14,113	100.00
Republican hold			

=== 2018 ===
2018 Connecticut House of Representatives election, District 134
Party	Candidate	Votes	%
Republican	Laura Devlin (Incumbent)	5,729	52.2
Democratic	Ashley Gaudiano	5,251	47.8
Total votes		10,980	100.00
Republican hold			

=== 2016 ===
2016 Connecticut House of Representatives election, District 134
Party	Candidate	Votes	%
Republican	Laura Devlin (Incumbent)	7,377	60.34
Democratic	Frederick Garrity	4,849	39.66
Total votes		12,266	100.00
Republican hold			

=== 2014 ===
2014 Connecticut House of Representatives election, District 134
Party	Candidate	Votes	%
Republican	Laura Devlin	4,353	51.0
Democratic	Tara Cook-Littman	3,989	46.7
Independent Party	Laura Devlin	191	2.2
Total votes		8,533	100.00
Republican hold			

=== 2012 ===
2012 Connecticut House of Representatives election, District 134
Party	Candidate	Votes	%
Republican	Tony Hwang (Incumbent)	7,621	65.5
Democratic	Heather Dean	4,016	34.5
Total votes		11,637	100.00
Republican hold			
