= Alan Harris Nevas =

American judge (1928–2025)

Senior Judge of the United States District Court for the District of Connecticut
- In office March 27, 1997 – February 2, 2009

Judge of the United States District Court for the District of Connecticut
- In office October 17, 1985 – March 27, 1997
- Appointed by: Ronald Reagan
- Preceded by: Seat established by 98 Stat. 333
- Succeeded by: Christopher F. Droney

United States Attorney for the District of Connecticut
- In office 1981–1985
- President: Ronald Reagan
- Preceded by: Richard Blumenthal
- Succeeded by: Stanley A. Twardy Jr.

Member of the Connecticut House of Representatives from the 136th district
- In office January 3, 1973 – January 5, 1977
- Preceded by: Leonard S. Paoletta
- Succeeded by: Julie Belaga

Member of the Connecticut House of Representatives from the 144th district
- In office January 6, 1971 – January 3, 1973
- Preceded by: Edwin R. Green
- Succeeded by: Sidney M. "Sid" Sherer

Personal details
- Born: Alan Harris Nevas; March 27, 1928 Norwalk, Connecticut, U.S.
- Died: April 19, 2025 (aged 97) Westport, Connecticut, U.S.
- Party: Democratic
- Education: Syracuse University (A.B.); New York University School of Law (LL.B.)

Alan Harris Nevas (March 27, 1928 – April 19, 2025) was a United States district judge of the United States District Court for the District of Connecticut.

== Education and career ==
Born in Norwalk, Connecticut, Nevas received an Artium Baccalaureus degree from Syracuse University in 1949. He received a Bachelor of Laws from New York University School of Law in 1951. He was in private practice of law in Westport, Connecticut from 1951 to 1952. He was in the United States Army as a Sergeant First Class from 1952 to 1954. He was in private practice of law in Westport from 1954 to 1981. He was a member of the Connecticut House of Representatives from 1971 to 1977 and was a Republican. He was a Justice of the Peace in Westport from 1976 to 1981. He was the United States Attorney for the District of Connecticut from 1981 to 1985.

== Federal judicial service ==
Nevas was nominated by President Ronald Reagan on September 9, 1985, to the United States District Court for the District of Connecticut, to a new seat created by 98 Stat. 333. He was confirmed by the United States Senate on October 16, 1985, and received commission on October 17, 1985. He assumed senior status on March 27, 1997, and retired on February 2, 2009.

== Post judicial service ==
Following his retirement from the federal bench, Nevas became special counsel to Levett Rockwood P.C., a corporate law firm in Westport. Upon Levett Rockwood's combination with Verrill Dana, a leading New England regional law firm, in 2015, he became Senior Counsel to Verrill, where he continued to practice, primarily as an arbitrator and mediator. During his tenure at Levett Rockwood, Nevas was appointed by former Governor Jodi Rell to chair the state's investigation into the causes of the deadly February 7, 2010 explosion at the Kleen Energy power plant in Middletown, Connecticut, and to chair the committee that allocated $7.7 million in funds to families impacted by the December 14, 2012 Sandy Hook Elementary School shooting in Newtown, Connecticut.

Nevas died on April 19, 2025, at the age of 97.

== Sources ==
Connecticut House of Representatives
| Preceded by Edwin R. Green | Member of the Connecticut House of Representatives from the 144th district 1971–1973 | Succeeded by Sidney M. "Sid" Sherer |
| Preceded by Leonard S. Paoletta | Member of the Connecticut House of Representatives from the 136th district 1973–1977 | Succeeded by Julie Belaga |
Legal offices
| Preceded by Richard Blumenthal | United States Attorney for the District of Connecticut; 1981–1995 | Succeeded by Stanley A. Twardy Jr. |
| Preceded by Seat established by 98 Stat. 333 | Judge of the United States District Court for the District of Connecticut; 1985–1997 | Succeeded by Christopher F. Droney |
