= Agnes Giannini =

American politician (died 1977)

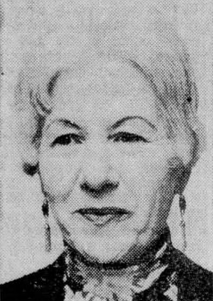

Member of the Connecticut House of Representatives from the 134th district
- In office 1969–1971
- Preceded by: Robert J. Testo
- Succeeded by: Nicholas Panuzio

Personal details
- Born: 1912 or 1913
- Died: October 24, 1977 (aged 64) Bridgeport, Connecticut, U.S.
- Party: Democratic
- Spouse: Henry R. Giannini
- Children: 6

Agnes Giannini (died October 24, 1977) was an American politician who served in the Connecticut House of Representatives from 1969 to 1971, representing the 134th district as a Democrat.

== Personal life ==
Giannini was married to Henry R. Giannini, and she had six children. She was a resident of Bridgeport, Connecticut.

== Political career ==
A Democrat, Giannini was elected to the Connecticut House of Representatives in 1968, succeeding fellow Democrat Robert J. Testo, and she served one term representing the 134th district. She ran for reelection in 1970, but was defeated by Republican candidate Nicholas Panuzio.

Following her service in the House, Giannini served on the Bridgeport Board of Education. She was secretary of the board from 1976 to her death in 1977.

Giannini was a member of the Order of Women Legislators.

== Death ==
Giannini died on October 24, 1977, at age 64. She had a heart attack at a meeting of the Bridgeport Board of Education shortly before she was scheduled to deliver a farewell speech as her term on the board was expiring. She was taken to St. Vincent's Medical Center, where she died two hours later.
