= Jonathan Steinberg (politician) =

American politician

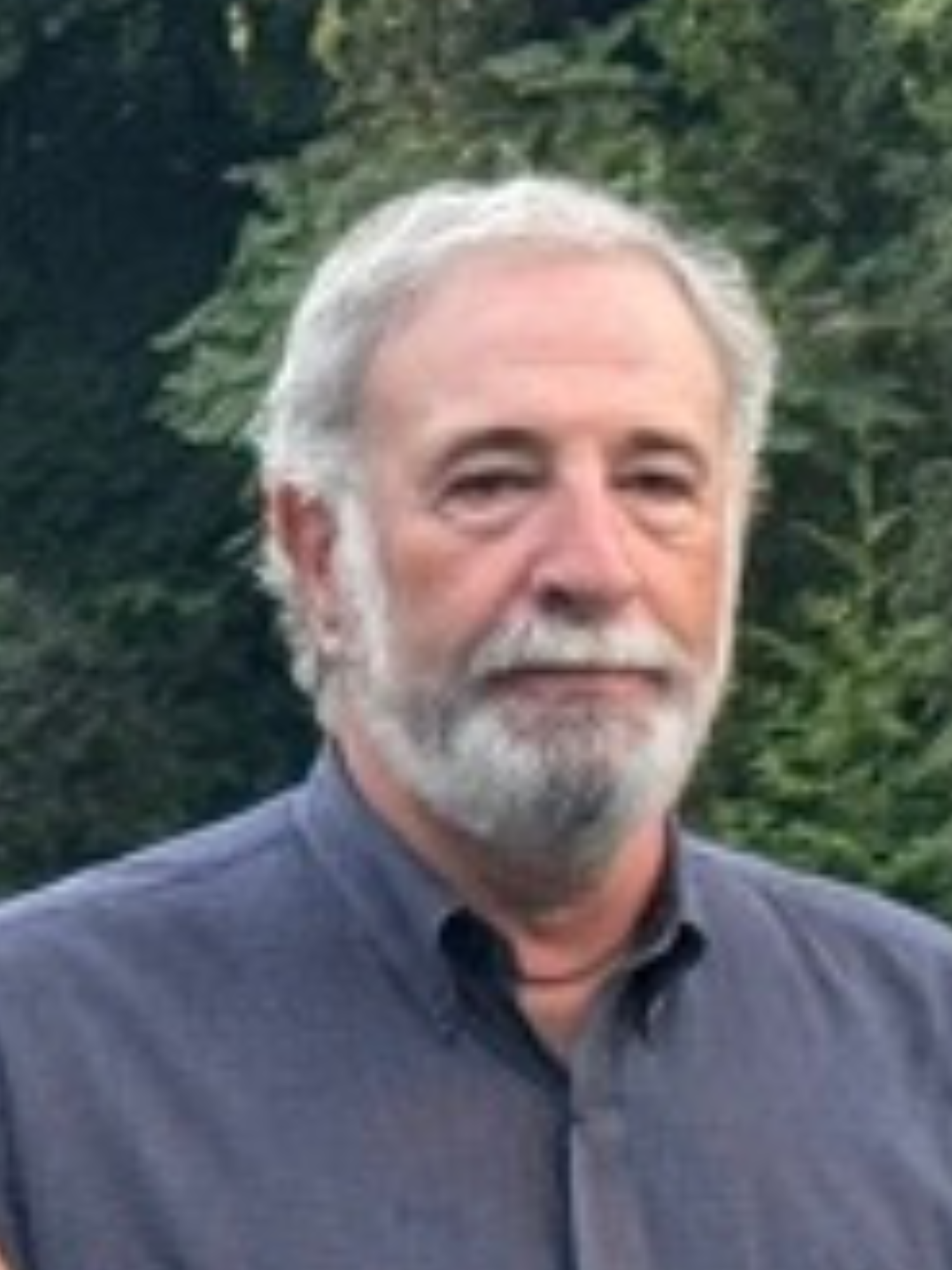
- Steinberg in 2024

Member of the Connecticut House of Representatives from the 136th district
- Incumbent
- Assumed office January 5, 2011
- Preceded by: Joseph Mioli
- Succeeded by: Lee Goldstein (elect)

Personal details
- Born: Bridgeport, Connecticut, U.S.
- Party: Democratic
- Education: Yale University (BA); New York University (MBA)

Johnathan Philip Steinberg is an American Democratic Party politician currently serving as a member of the Connecticut House of Representatives from the 136th district, which encompasses part of Westport, since 2011.

== Early life and education ==
Steinberg grew up in Westport and graduated from Staples High School in 1974.

== Career ==
Steinberg was elected for the first time in 2010, defeating Republican candidate Nitzy Cohen. More than a decade later, in 2021, he ran for the position of First Selectman of Westport, although his candidacy was not successful; he was defeated by Republican Jennifer Tooker.

Within the state legislature, Steinberg has held several roles. He serves as co-chair of the House Public Health Committee and, in addition, participates as a member of both the Transportation Committee and the Energy and Technology Committee.
