= Sarah Keitt =

American politician (born 1969)

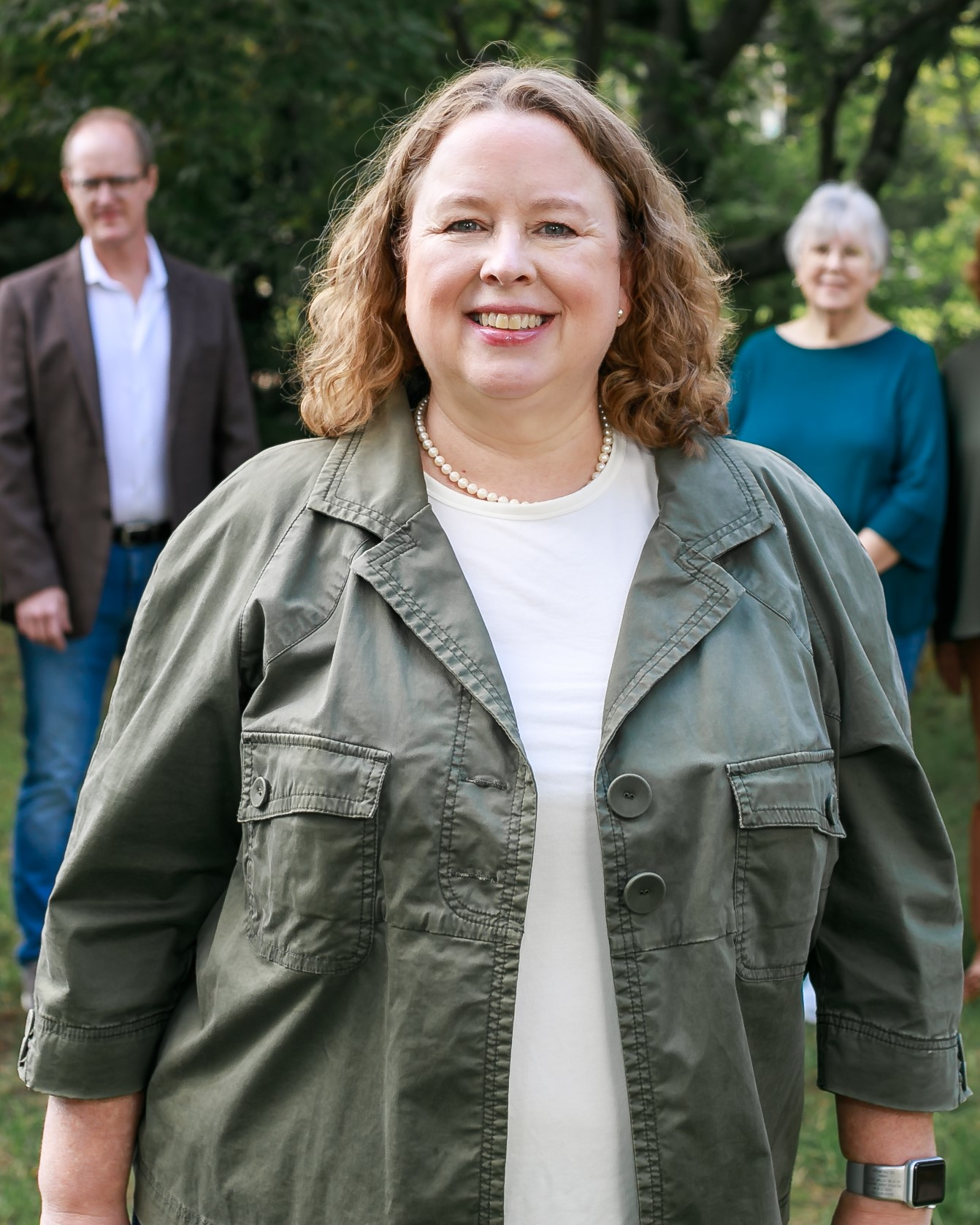

Member of the Connecticut House of Representatives from the 134th district
- Incumbent
- Assumed office January 4, 2023
- Preceded by: Laura Devlin

Personal details
- Born: September 3, 1969 (age 56) Hingham, Massachusetts, U.S.
- Party: Democratic
- Spouse: Geordie Keitt
- Children: 2
- Education: Middlebury College (BA); George Washington University (MPH)
- Website: State House website

Sarah Keitt (born September 3, 1969) is an American politician serving as a member of the Connecticut House of Representatives from the 134th district since 2023. A member of the Democratic Party, Keitt was first elected in 2022, and assumed office on January 4, 2023.

== Early life and education ==
Keitt was raised in Hingham, Massachusetts. She attended Middlebury College, where she earned a Bachelor's degree, and The George Washington University, where she earned a Masters in Public Health. In 2016, she moved to Fairfield with her husband and two kids.

== Political career ==
Keitt was first elected to Fairfield's Town Planning & Zoning Commission as an alternate in 2021. In 2022, Keitt ran for the 134th State House district, whose Republican incumbent Laura Devlin was running for Lieutenant Governor. Keitt faced Republican Meghan McCloat in the general election.

Initial results on election night 2022 had McCloat in the lead, prompting a concession from Keitt. After all the ballots were counted however, Keitt took a narrow lead. Following a recount in both Fairfield and Trumbull, Keitt was declared the victor by 14 votes. In 2024, Keitt was re-elected by a margin of over 400 votes against Republican Melissa Longo.

Keitt currently serves as Assistant Majority Leader, as vice-chair of the Committee on Children, and as a member of both the Human Services Committee, and the Public Health Committee.
