= 2019 Bridgeport, Connecticut, mayoral election =

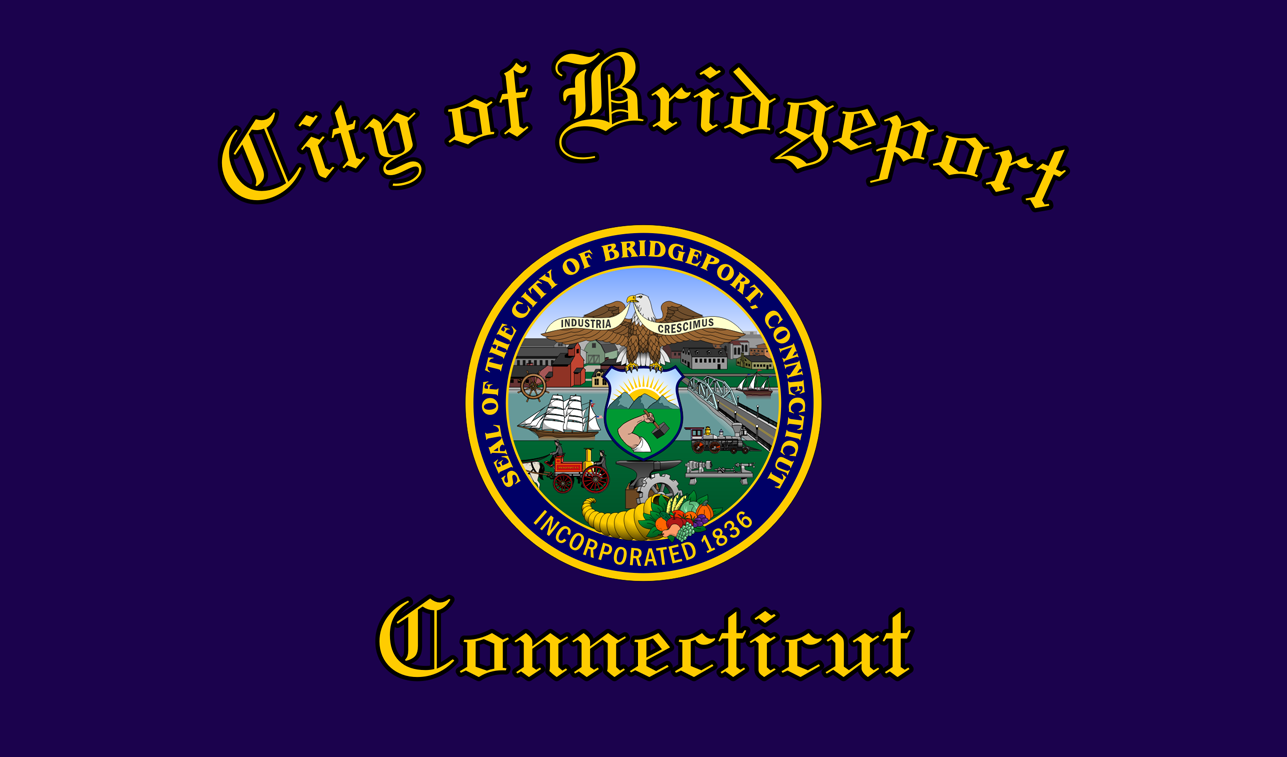
- November 5, 2019
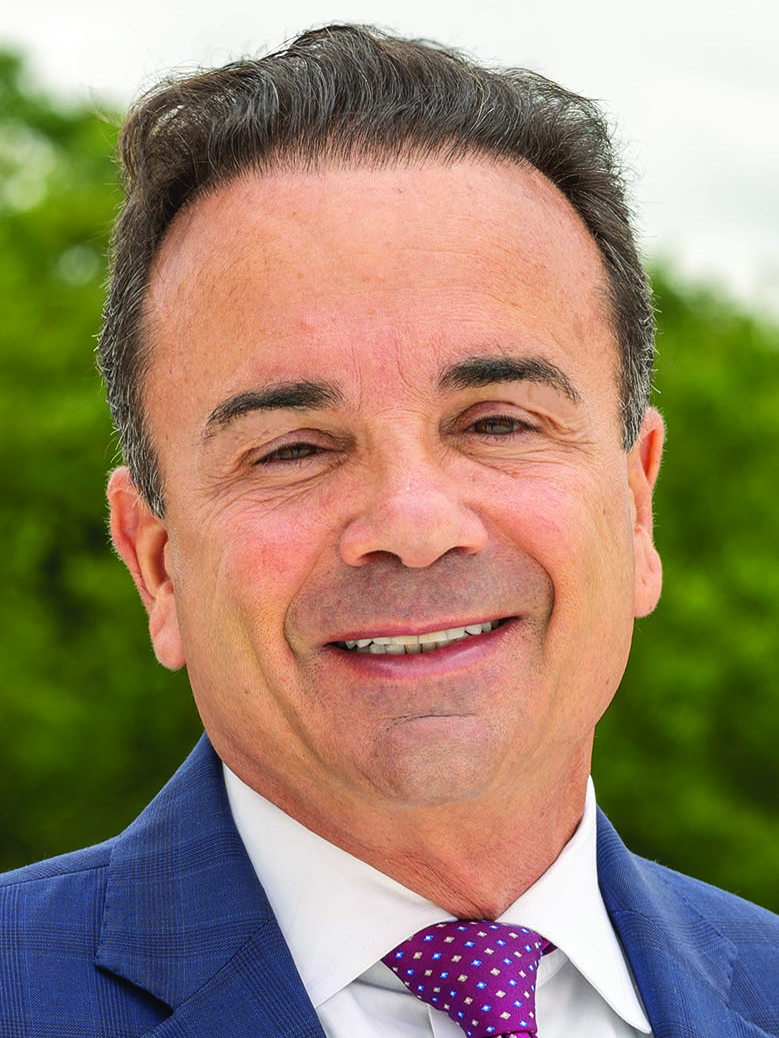

Candidate	Joseph Ganim	Marilyn Moore (write-in)	John Rodriguez
Party	Democratic	Democratic	Republican
Popular vote	9,592	4,735	1,583
Percentage	59.96%	29.60%	9.90%
Mayor before election
Joseph Ganim
Democratic
Elected mayor
Joseph Ganim
Democratic

Bridgeport, Connecticut, held an election for mayor on November 5, 2019. It saw the reelection of incumbent mayor and former 2018 gubernatorial candidate Joseph Ganim.

== Nominations ==
Primaries were held on September 10.

=== Democratic primary ===
Voter turnout in the Democratic primary was under 20%.

Democratic incumbent Joseph Ganim narrowly won renomination over state senator Marilyn Moore. Moore had won the votes cast on election day, but her lead was surmounted by Ganim once absentee ballots were counted.

Moore had filed a lawsuit alleging that there were "irregularities and illegal conduct" surrounding absentee ballots and requesting a judge order a re-do of the primary election.

Democratic primary election results
Party	Candidate	Votes	%
Democratic	Joseph P. Ganim (incumbent)	4,728	51.55
Democratic	Marilyn Moore	4,443	48.45
Total votes		9,171	

=== Republican primary ===
Voter turnout in the Republican primary was roughly 14%.

Republican primary election results
Party	Candidate	Votes	%
Republican	John Rodriguez	282	47.55
Republican	Ethan Book	167	28.16
Republican	Dishon Francis	144	24.28
Total votes		593	

== General election results ==
General election results
Party	Candidate	Votes	%
Democratic	Joseph P. Ganim (incumbent)	9,592	59.96
Democratic	Marilyn Moore (write-in)	4,735	29.60
Republican	John Rodriguez	1,583	9.90
Write-in	Ethan Book	52	0.33
Write-in	Jeff Kohut	27	0.17
Write-in	Mary Ann McLaine	8	0.05
Turnout		15,997	
