= Hugh Curran (politician) =

American politician (1924–2006)

45th Mayor of Bridgeport, Connecticut
- In office 1965–1971
- Preceded by: Samuel Tedesco
- Succeeded by: Nicholas Panuzio

Personal details
- Born: January 20, 1924 Bridgeport, Connecticut, U.S.
- Died: February 10, 2006 (aged 82) Milford, Connecticut, U.S.
- Party: Democratic
- Education: College of the Holy Cross (BA); Boston College (LLB)

Hugh Cunningham Curran (January 20, 1924 – February 10, 2006) was an American politician, lawyer, and jurist who was Mayor of Bridgeport from 1965 to 1971. Prior to his time as mayor, he served in the US armed forces and worked as a lawyer; afterwards, he served as a judge and administrator.

== Early life and career ==
He was born in Bridgeport, Connecticut, the son of Mary Elizabeth and Hugh Aloysius Curran. He fought in WWII, serving as a fighter pilot in the European theater. Afterwards, he received his bachelor's degree from the College of the Holy Cross, and his law degree from Boston College.

After serving as a lawyer at Curran, Kennedy, and Lyddy, Curran was elected to the Connecticut State House as a Democrat in 1955, serving a single term. He became the Bridgeport City Attorney in 1957, and then ran for mayor, succeeding incumbent Samuel Tedesco in 1965. Among his accomplishments was the construction of the Wonderland of Ice, an indoor ice skating rink. He ran for and won two more terms, but on his fourth try lost to Republican Nicholas Panuzio, by a 9-vote margin. He was a delegate to the Democratic National Convention in 1960 and 1968.

After his mayorship, he returned to the private sector. In 1974, he became a Superior court judge for the state of Connecticut, serving for twelve years.

== Later life ==
He married Eleanor Reagan Curran in 1952; they had 5 children. He was a Roman Catholic and a member of the Hibernian Order.
