= Bill Finch (politician) =

American politician

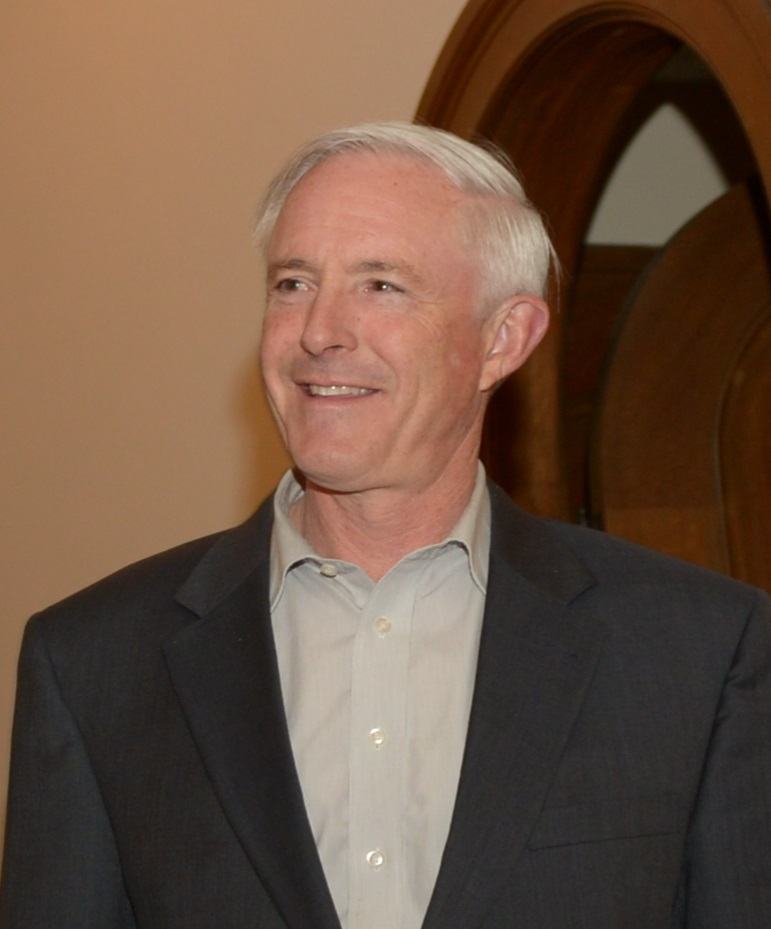
- Bill Finch at a ceremony held by the United States Coast Guard in May 2014

53rd Mayor of Bridgeport, Connecticut
- In office December 1, 2007 – December 1, 2015
- Preceded by: John M. Fabrizi
- Succeeded by: Joe Ganim

Member of the Connecticut Senate from the 22nd district
- In office January 3, 2001 – December 1, 2007
- Preceded by: Lee Scarpetti
- Succeeded by: Robert Russo

Personal details
- Born: March 4, 1956 (age 70) Connecticut, U.S.
- Party: Democratic
- Children: 4
- Education: University of Connecticut (BA)

Bill Finch (born March 4, 1956) is an American retired politician who served as mayor of Bridgeport, Connecticut for eight years after previously serving in the Connecticut Senate for seven years. As mayor, he was known for his strong environmentally friendly policies and his tax reform efforts, both of which received local and national praise. He was defeated for re-election as mayor in 2015 by former mayor Joe Ganim. Finch has since moved on to the private sector and rejected the idea of running for mayor again.

== Early life and family ==
Finch grew up in Trumbull and Bridgeport. He attended the University of Connecticut in Storrs, Connecticut. He received a Bachelor of Science degree in Agricultural Economics, and while he was there served as the student representative to the university's board of trustees and was elected president of the undergraduate student government. He has four children, all of whom lived in Bridgeport and attended Bridgeport public schools, as well as charter and parochial schools.

== Political career ==
After graduating from college, Finch moved back to Bridgeport where he became a city council member for nine and a half years. While on the city council, Finch developed a record of cutting taxes, aimed to create new jobs, and was involved in public safety by voting to add more police officers to the city's force and promoting programs such as gun safety lock distribution.

As a councilman, Finch helped negotiate the construction of the Bluefish Baseball Stadium, the Arena at Harbor Yard, and Steel Point. He also served as member of the Grow Bridgeport Fund, the Connecticut Zoological Society, and the Leo J. Ryan Education Foundation Board of Directors.

=== State senate ===
In 2000, Finch was elected state senator for the 22nd district, representing Bridgeport, Trumbull, and Monroe. He served in the legislature as Senate Chairman of the Environment Committee and as Senate Vice Chairman of the Transportation Committee. He was also a member of the Education Committee and the Finance, Revenue & Bonding Committee.

As a senator, Finch's legislative priorities included property tax reform, smart growth initiatives, education funding, expanding the Husky healthcare initiative, combating underage drinking, transportation issues, and gun control and crime prevention. Upon arriving at the Senate, Finch initiated the "Who Wants to Change the World?" Contest – a program to involve youth with government. He also promoted an ongoing movement to recognize and preserve the works of landscape architect Frederick Law Olmsted.

=== Mayor of Bridgeport ===
==== Environmental advocacy ====
Finch was elected Mayor of Bridgeport in November 2007 with approximately 76% of the vote. During his first year as mayor, Finch focused on professionalizing city government, aiming to stabilize the city's finances, and signing his first Executive Order to Promote Sustainability in Bridgeport. Finch is known for being a conservationist and advocate for programs, legislation and organizations that promote green living and green business in the state of Connecticut. In his first year in office, Finch signed up for the Connecticut Clean Energy Fund's Clean Energy Communities Program. He also signed an Executive Order to promote sustainability in Bridgeport. Upon signing this order, he assembled a team of 100 volunteers who worked for 18 months to compile the BGreen2020 initiative, which served as a "Greenprint" for the City's overall vision and path forward for the "green" economy. Among the programs included in BGreen2020 are: Solar leasing of rooftops, a comprehensive energy plan, increasing recycling rates (Recycling in the city has increased almost 20 percent since Finch signed an Executive Order to promote sustainability), and moving to single stream recycling and a Parks Master Plan for the city. Finch's sustainability plan further calls for reducing the total number of vehicle miles traveled in the city, mainly by building "complete streets." Finch also ordered a $35,000 feasibility study to see how viable it would be to use the city's sewage waste to produce energy in a biomass facility. The city began exploring the possibility of constructing a biomass plant, which generates 365 kilowatts of renewable energy a year.

In 2008 and 2010, the local environmental group Conscious Decisions recognized Finch with its Green Coast Award for his conservation and sustainability efforts in the City of Bridgeport and the region. Finch was inducted into the National Environmental Hall of Fame, and was named a "Green Advocate" by Business New Haven in its annual "Green Awards" issue. Finch says, ""We've gotta think green. We've gotta help people live green. And we're not just doing this for a city of 150,000 people. We're trying to do these things that will become best practices in many places."

In April 2010, he traveled to China as part of a small group of U.S. Mayors to discuss sustainability and green initiatives with their counterparts in China.

==== Programs and awards ====
Finch joined with the mayors of Hartford, New Haven and New London in 2008 to urge the state to fund its Payment-in-Lieu-of-Taxes (PILOT) program, which would offset the revenue burden on municipalities that are home to tax-exempt institutions like colleges and hospitals. Finch argues that a full reimbursement under the PILOT program would provide relief to cities and towns across the state, and with full funding, the PILOT program would add $5 million to the Bridgeport city budget.

Finch also supports property tax reform. He was recognized for his tax reform efforts with the Regional Impact Award by the Bridgeport Regional Business Council. In April 2009, Finch was awarded the Small Business Advocate Award presented by PartnerAmerica™, a public/private partnership of The United States Conference of Mayors and American Management Services.

A member of the U.S. Conference of Mayors, Finch was elected to its advisory board in June 2009, 18 months into his term. The board consists of 27 mayors from around the country who consult with the USCM Executive Committee on all matters related to police and program. He also is a member of its Tourism, Arts, Parks, Entertainment and Sports subcommittee.

On June 27, 2011 Finch received support from Mario Testa that included a formal complaint about an anti-Finch billboard posted on I-95.

On July 31, 2012 Finch signed a youth curfew ordinance that the city council passed. The ordinance, phased in over time, banned persons under 18 from being in public without a parent or legal guardian during late hours (11 p.m.-6 a.m. Sunday through Thursday, and midnight-6 a.m. Friday and Saturday), with various exceptions (such as attendance at or travel to or from school-sponsored events, religious activities, and First Amendment activities). The curfew, passed in response to violent crime, was backed by the Greater Bridgeport branch of the NAACP. The curfew lapsed, but was later revived in 2020.

As mayor, in 2015, Finch received the US EPA Climate Leadership Award.

==== Post-political career ====
Finch sought re-election in 2015, but lost the Democratic nomination to Joe Ganim, who had previously served as Bridgeport's mayor from 1991 to 2003 before being convicted and jailed on corruption charges. Finch went on to become acting director of the New York State Thruway Authority and Canal Corporation and a fellow at the Rockefeller Institute of Government, and in 2018 he was named executive director of Bridgeport's Discovery Museum and Planetarium. He said, "I was the mayor of a city, now I'm the mayor of a concept." and rejected the prospect of running for Bridgeport mayor again. In 2020, Finch stepped down as Discovery Museum chief. He stated his next career would "be announced at a later date." He currently serves labor (IBEW) and management (NECA) at the Connecticut Labor-Management Cooperation Committee where he lobbies for the interests of the best electricians and helps develop business.

=== Return to politics ===
In May 2024, Finch announced his candidacy for his old State Senate seat after incumbent Democrat Marilyn Moore announced that she would not seek re-election. He lost in the Democratic primary to Sujata Gadkar-Wilcox of Trumbull.
