= William J. Nardini =

American judge (born 1969)

William Nardini
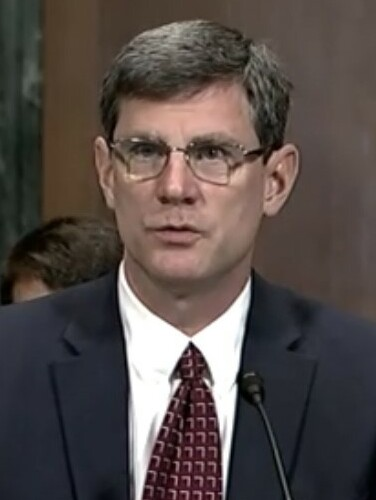
- Nardini in 2019

Judge of the United States Court of Appeals for the Second Circuit
- Incumbent
- Assumed office November 14, 2019
- Appointed by: Donald Trump
- Preceded by: Christopher F. Droney

Personal details
- Born: William Joseph Nardini; 1969 (age 56–57) Glen Ridge, New Jersey, U.S.
- Education: Georgetown University (BA); Yale University (JD); European University Institute (LLM)

William Joseph Nardini (born 1969) is an American lawyer who serves as a United States circuit judge of the United States Court of Appeals for the Second Circuit.

== Early life and career ==
Nardini earned his Bachelor of Arts, summa cum laude, from Georgetown University. Afterwards, he earned his Juris Doctor from Yale Law School, where he served as Executive Editor of the Yale Law Journal. Nardini subsequently earned a Master of Laws from the European University Institute. After graduating from law school, Nardini served as a law clerk to Judges José A. Cabranes from 1994 to 1995, and Guido Calabresi of the United States Court of Appeals for the Second Circuit from 1995 to 1996, and to Associate Justice Sandra Day O'Connor of the Supreme Court of the United States from 1996 to 1997.

Nardini received his Master of Laws in European, Comparative, and International Law European University Institute in Fiesole, Italy, in 1998. He served as a consultant for the Italian Constitutional Court. Nardini then went on to serve as an Assistant United States Attorney for the District of Connecticut from 2000 to 2010, where he prosecuted criminal cases and was promoted to Deputy Chief of the Criminal Division. From 2010 to 2014, he served as the Justice Department attaché to the United States Ambassador to Italy, where he represented the United States in extradition and mutual legal assistance in Italian criminal matters. He once again served as an AUSA from 2014 to 2019, as Chief of the Criminal Division until his appointment to the Second Circuit.

== Federal judicial service ==
On August 28, 2019, President Donald Trump announced his intent to nominate Nardini to serve as a United States Circuit Judge of the United States Court of Appeals for the Second Circuit. On September 19, 2019, his nomination was sent to the United States Senate. He was nominated to fill the seat vacated by Judge Christopher F. Droney, who assumed senior status on June 30, 2019. On September 25, 2019, a hearing on his nomination was held before the Senate Judiciary Committee. On October 24, 2019, his nomination was reported out of committee by a 19–3 vote. On November 6, 2019, the Senate invoked cloture on his nomination by an 87–3 vote. On November 7, 2019, his nomination was confirmed by a 86–2 vote. He received his judicial commission on November 14, 2019.

=== Notable cases ===
- On October 10, 2024 Judge Nardini denied Sean Combs' request for immediate release pending appeal on bond with the 2nd Circuit Court of Appeals.

== See also ==
- List of law clerks for the eighth seat of the Supreme Court of the United States

Legal offices
Preceded by Christopher F. Droney	Judge of the United States Court of Appeals for the Second Circuit; 2019–present	Incumbent
