= Mark Paoletta =

American attorney (born 1962)

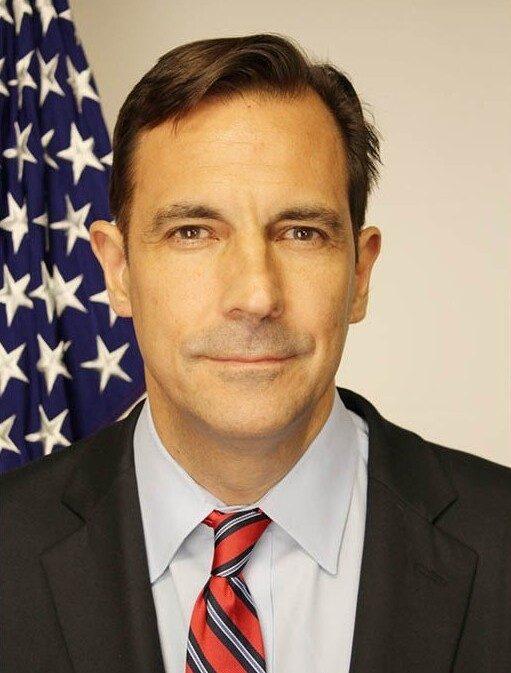
- Official portrait, 2018

Acting Director of the Consumer Financial Protection Bureau
- Incumbent
- Assumed office August 1, 2026
- President: Donald Trump
- Preceded by: Russell Vought (acting)

Deputy Director of the Consumer Financial Protection Bureau
- Incumbent
- Assumed office June 2, 2026
- President: Donald Trump
- Director: Russell Vought; Himself (acting)
- Preceded by: Geoffrey Gradler (acting)

General Counsel for the Office of Management and Budget
- Incumbent
- Assumed office January 20, 2025
- President: Donald Trump
- Preceded by: Daniel Jacobson
- In office January 8, 2018 – January 20, 2021
- President: Donald Trump
- Preceded by: James W. Carroll
- Succeeded by: Samuel Bagenstos

Counsel to the Vice President
- In office January 25, 2017 – January 5, 2018
- Vice President: Mike Pence
- Preceded by: John McGrail
- Succeeded by: Matt Morgan

Personal details
- Born: Mark R. A. Paoletta; October 5, 1962 (age 64) Fairfield, Connecticut, U.S.
- Spouse: Patricia Jones
- Children: 2
- Relatives: Leonard S. Paoletta (uncle)
- Education: Duquesne University (BS); Georgetown University (JD)

Mark R. A. Paoletta (born October 5, 1962) is an American attorney who has served as the general counsel of the Office of Management and Budget since 2025. Paoletta has additionally served as the deputy director of the Consumer Financial Protection Bureau since June 2026 and as its acting director since August 2026. He served as the general counsel of the Consumer Financial Protection Bureau from 2018 to 2021 and as the counsel to the vice president from 2017 to 2018.

Paoletta graduated from Duquesne University with a bachelor's degree in political science and from Georgetown University with a Juris Doctor. He worked for the George H. W. Bush administration as a personnel staffer and as an associate counsel, where he assisted in the Supreme Court nomination of Clarence Thomas; through his work, he became a long-standing associate of Thomas. By 1997, Paoletta had become the chief counsel of the House Committee on Energy and Commerce. He returned to private practice in 2007.

In January 2017, Vice President Mike Pence appointed Paoletta as his counsel. Paoletta became the general counsel of the Office of Management and Budget in January 2018. He was involved in creating the first Trump administration's practice of rescinding funds, including military assistance for Ukraine. After Trump's first term, Paoletta began working for Schaerr Jaffe. In December 2024, President Donald Trump named Paoletta as the general counsel of the Office of Management and Budget. He became the deputy director of the Consumer Financial Protection Bureau in June 2026 and the bureau's acting director in August 2026.

== Early life and education (1962–1987) ==
Mark R. A. Paoletta was born on October 5, 1962, in Fairfield, Connecticut. Paoletta is the son of Italian immigrants. He was the son of Joseph Paoletta, a pharmacist. His uncle, Leonard S. Paoletta, was a lawyer who served as the mayor of Bridgeport, Connecticut, from 1981 to 1985. The younger Paoletta attended Fairfield Warde High School, where he played basketball. He later attended Duquesne University, majoring in political science. Paoletta participated in the Washington Semester program at American University and interned for the Republican National Committee. He worked for Frederick K. Biebel, a Republican political strategist. After graduating from Duquesne, Paoletta began attending the Georgetown University Law Center in 1984. He volunteered for Ronald Reagan's 1984 presidential campaign and George H. W. Bush's 1988 presidential campaign.

== Career ==
=== Private practice and White House work (1987–1995) ===
After graduating from Georgetown University, Paoletta worked for a private law firm in Washington, D.C. Following George H. W. Bush's victory in the 1988 presidential election, Bush's presidential transition staff offered Paoletta a position in Bush's administration. Paoletta began working for the White House in January 1989 as the deputy associate director of White House personnel, assisting the administration in staffing the Department of Justice and regulatory commissions. By that year, he had married Patricia Jones, with whom he has two children. By June 1992, Paoletta had become an assistant counsel in the Office of the White House Counsel. He rejoined O'Connor & Hannan as a partner in June 1993, specializing in legislative matters and litigation. By August 1995, Paoletta had become a partner at Keck, Mahin & Cate.

=== House Committee on Energy and Commerce (1997–2007) ===
By November 1997, Paoletta had become the chief counsel of the House Committee on Energy and Commerce. He was involved in investigating a campaign finance controversy over alleged Chinese interference in Bill Clinton's 1996 presidential campaign; an internal memorandum written by Paoletta, which claimed there was "no smoking gun", was used by some Democrats to exonerate Clinton. Paoletta led inquiries into the Enron scandal; the ImClone stock trading case, which involved the businesswoman Martha Stewart; and the Hewlett-Packard spying scandal.

=== Return to private practice (2007–2017) ===
Following the commencement of the 110th United States Congress in January 2007, Dickstein Shapiro announced that it had hired Paoletta. By August, he had begun representing the political strategist Scott Jennings in proceedings over Attorney General Alberto Gonzales's responsibility in the dismissal of U.S. attorneys the previous year. The personal trainer Brian McNamee added Paoletta to his legal team as he was accused of having provided anabolic steroids to the baseball pitcher Roger Clemens. In September 2008, John McCain's 2008 presidential campaign hired Paoletta to respond to attacks about McCain's running mate, Sarah Palin. Paoletta additionally represented Timothy E. Wilens and Thomas Spencer, researchers at Harvard University who were alleged to have had a conflict of interest in advocating for administering antipsychotic medicines to children, as well as LightSquared and its parent company, Harbinger Capital. In September 2016, Paoletta established his own firm, MP Strategies.

=== Association with Clarence Thomas ===
According to Paoletta, he and Clarence Thomas first met when Paoletta was in college. Paoletta was involved in Thomas's hearings to serve on the United States Court of Appeals for the District of Columbia Circuit, telling the White House to take "the offense" on the proceedings. In 1991, U.S. News and World Report reported that Paoletta had become acquainted with Thomas through his Supreme Court confirmation process. Paoletta assisted Thomas in his confirmation. After Thomas was sworn in to the Supreme Court, Paoletta was diagnosed with cancer; Paoletta told the Pittsburgh Post-Gazette that Thomas called or visited him "every single day". Paoletta later established a website to support Thomas.

In 1994, the journalists Jane Mayer and Jill Abramson published Strange Justice: The Selling of Clarence Thomas, a book that claimed that Paoletta had sought to garner support for Thomas, an apparent violation of the Anti-Lobbying Act. Paoletta sued Houghton Mifflin over the statement, contending that the act only covered legislation, not judicial nominations. Paoletta was represented pro bono by Thomas Yannucci, a managing partner of Kirkland & Ellis. Houghton Mifflin agreed to remove the sentence in later publications of the book in July 1995. In 2001, David Brock, the author of The Real Anita Hill (1993), claimed that Paoletta had given him damaging information about Kaye Savage, an associate of Thomas who later said that Thomas had a voluminous collection of pornography; Paoletta denied the accusations.

According to The Washington Post, Paoletta engaged in a public relations campaign for Thomas and his wife, Ginni, throughout 2016. Paoletta was paid through a non-profit firm, Judicial Education Project. After obtaining an early script of the film Confirmation, about Thomas and his accuser, Anita Hill, Paoletta wrote to HBO's president, chief executive, and the writer of the film, claiming that the script contained "numerous distortions, omissions and fabrications". Paoletta worked with a public relations firm in Alexandria, Virginia, to establish a website, confirmationbiased.com, rebuffing the film's portrayals. He criticized Hill and the film publicly in The Daily Caller, National Review, and the Washington Examiner.

After Confirmation's release, Paoletta began working with CRC Public Relations, a firm associated with Leonard Leo, the president of the Federalist Society, to create a fan account for Thomas on Twitter. Paoletta later worked on a documentary film for Thomas, Created Equal: Clarence Thomas in His Own Words (2020). He compiled the film's interviews into a book with the same name in 2022. By June 2022, Paoletta had begun representing Ginni Thomas. As investigators with the House Select Committee to Investigate the January 6th Attack on the United States Capitol considered having her speak before the committee, Paoletta argued that the committee did not have enough justification to warrant her presence.

In April 2023, ProPublica published an article revealing that Paoletta had traveled with Thomas on a yacht owned by the billionaire Harlan Crow in 2019; at the time, Paoletta had been the general counsel of the Office of Management and Budget. The following month, ProPublica published another article revealing that Crow had paid for Thomas's grandnephew's education. Paoletta corroborated the article but defended Thomas and Crow, describing them and their wives as "kind, generous, and loving people". In August, ProPublica reported on additional trips that Paoletta had taken with Thomas, which had been previously unreported.

== First Trump presidency (2017–2021) ==
On January 25, 2017, Vice President Mike Pence named Paoletta as his counsel. Paoletta was among several individuals who interviewed Judge Neil Gorsuch to be nominated on the Supreme Court. Pence appointed Paoletta to assist Kris Kobach in overseeing the Presidential Advisory Commission on Election Integrity. According to The Washington Post, Paoletta's efforts to be involved in Gorsuch's confirmation process conflicted with other officials, including Don McGahn, the White House counsel; at his swearing in, Gorsuch personally thanked Paoletta. In January 2018, Mick Mulvaney, the director of the Office of Management and Budget, hired Paoletta to serve as the agency's general counsel. Paoletta developed a "rescissions" plan to pull back appropriated but unspent funds and authored a letter to the Government Accountability Office claiming that the president had the authority to withhold funds.

Amid the 2018–2019 federal government shutdown, Paoletta sought to keep the effects of the shutdown minimal. The Government Accountability Office accused the Department of the Interior of violating the law by keeping parks open through recreational fees; Paoletta stated that the office could be ignored. After the shutdown, Paoletta advocated for a legal interpretation that would allow for President Donald Trump to build a border wall using military funds. The interpretation was opposed by Pat Cipollone, the White House counsel, and several Republicans in Congress, although it was supported by Trump. In 2019, Paoletta, alongside Russell Vought, the deputy director of the Office of Management and Budget, developed a plan to withhold military assistance to Ukraine, a central aspect of the Trump–Ukraine scandal. Ahead of Trump's impeachment trial over the scandal, Mulvaney recommended to Trump that he hire Paoletta to represent him.

== Post-presidency work (2021–2024) ==
In February 2021, Paoletta joined Vought's Center for American Restoration. By November 2021, he had become a lawyer at Schaerr Jaffe and had begun representing Project Veritas as the Federal Bureau of Investigation raided the homes of its employees over the theft of Ashley Biden's diary. In October 2024, Politico reported that Paoletta was assisting Donald Trump's transition staff in planning policy for the Department of Justice. After Trump's victory in the 2024 presidential election, Paoletta told career employees that they would be fired for resisting Trump's agenda.

== Second Trump presidency (2025–present) ==
As early as November 2023, The New York Times had speculated that Paoletta was likely to have a position in Donald Trump's prospective second term. After Trump won a second term, the Times reported that Paoletta was among several names being considered to be Trump's nominee for attorney general. On December 9, 2024, Trump named Paoletta as the general counsel of the Office of Management and Budget. Paoletta drafted the executive order setting off a federal grant pause in January 2025.

In February 2025, Vought, the director of the Office of Management and Budget and the acting director of the Consumer Financial Protection Bureau, began identifying Paoletta as the bureau's chief legal officer. In June 2026, Paoletta was appointed as the bureau's deputy director. In August, he became the acting director after Vought's term expired.

In August 2026, Trump named Paoletta as the chairman of the National Capital Planning Commission.
