= Joe Ganim =

American politician (born 1959)

Joseph P. Ganim
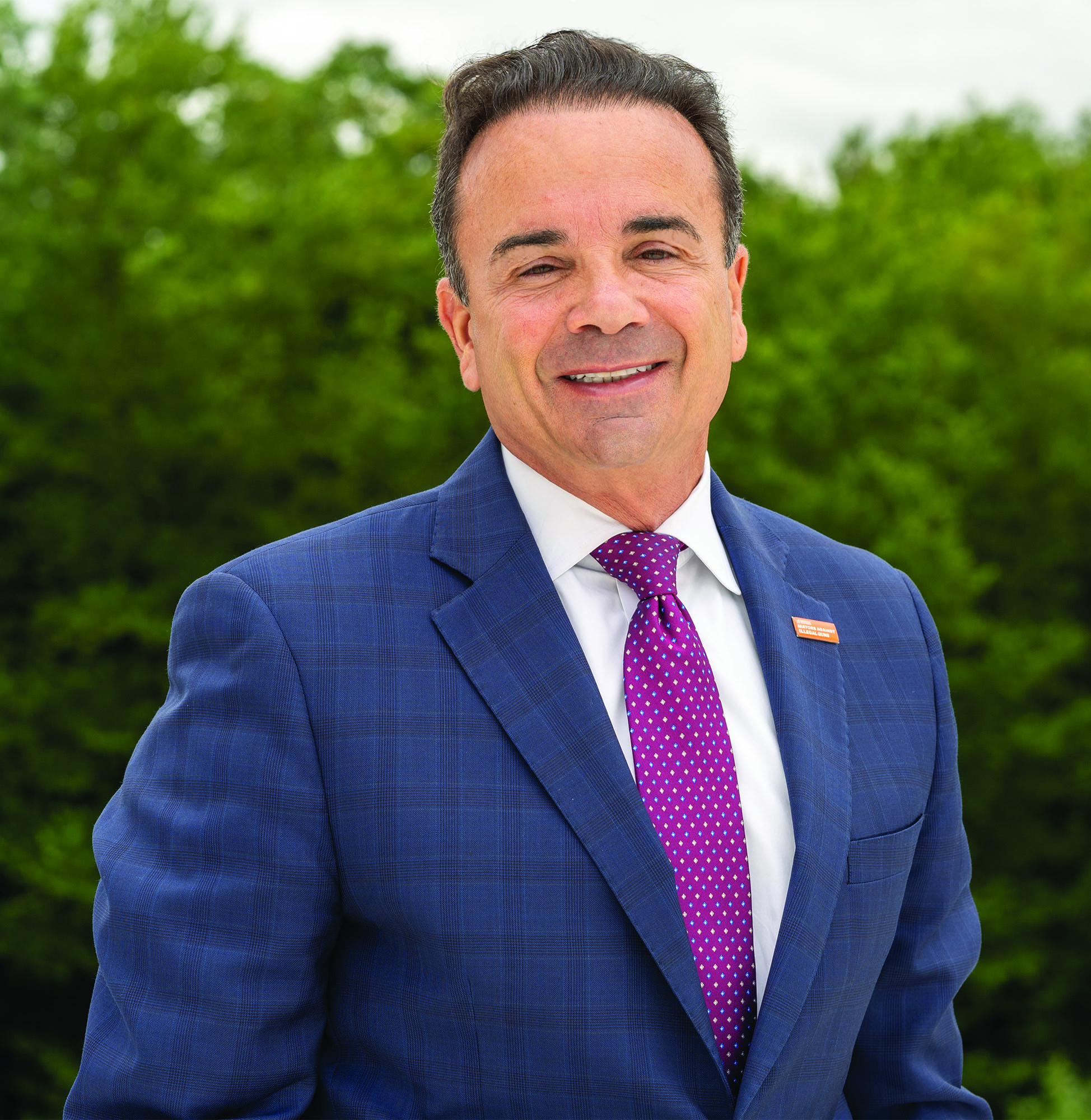

51st and 54th Mayor of Bridgeport
- Incumbent
- Assumed office December 1, 2015
- Preceded by: Bill Finch
- In office November 11, 1991 – April 4, 2003
- Preceded by: Mary C. Moran
- Succeeded by: John M. Fabrizi

Personal details
- Born: Joseph Peter Ganim; October 21, 1959 (age 66) Bridgeport, Connecticut, U.S.
- Party: Democratic
- Education: University of Connecticut (BA); University of Bridgeport (JD)

Joseph Peter Ganim (born October 21, 1959) is an American Democratic politician and former attorney who is the mayor of Bridgeport, Connecticut. He was elected mayor of the city six times, serving from 1991 to 2003, when he resigned after being convicted on federal felony corruption charges. In 2015, Ganim mounted a successful political comeback and was again elected Bridgeport mayor. Ganim was sworn in as mayor on December 1, 2015. Ganim has twice unsuccessfully sought the Democratic nomination for governor of Connecticut, running in 1994 and 2018.

Ganim was reelected to a consecutive term in 2019, and 2024, and is currently serving his seventh term as mayor of Bridgeport, Connecticut.

== Early life and education ==
Ganim was born to George W. Ganim Sr. and Josephine Ganim of Easton, Connecticut. Ganim's paternal grandparents, Wanis Joseph Ganim and Rose Baghdadi, were Lebanese immigrants who opened a grocery store in Bridgeport. Ganim's mother was the daughter of Dimian Tarick, a Syrian immigrant and Anna DeBernardi, who moved to Bridgeport from Naples. Ganim's father was a prominent Bridgeport attorney and Republican Party loyalist who was a lieutenant of local Republican boss Ed Sandula. Ganim, on the other hand, became a Democrat.

Ganim graduated from the University of Connecticut and received a J.D. degree in 1983 from the University of Bridgeport Law School (which later became Quinnipiac University School of Law).

== Early political career ==
In 1988, a young Ganim made his first run for office against Lee Samowitz in the 129th House District, a Connecticut House district in Bridgeport. Ganim lost, but only by about 150 votes.

== First mayoralty (1991–2003) ==
Ganim was elected the 51st mayor of Bridgeport in 1991, receiving 15,768 votes (54%) and defeating incumbent Mayor Mary C. Moran, who received 10,951 votes, and two minor party candidates, who got a combined total of 2,258 additional votes. During his campaign, Ganim accused Moran of making the city "a symbol of urban failure with a bankruptcy filing that drew national headlines."

Ganim was reelected four times, serving five terms. In 1993, Ganim won reelection in a landslide, defeating Republican Anthony G. Minutolo by a 4–1 margin. In 1995, Ganim defeated Republican challenger George H. Comer, the town chairman, by a 6–1 margin.

=== First term ===
At the time Ganim took office, the city's dire financial straits caused it to be the only municipality in Connecticut to have its finances under the control of a state board. The state board had ordered the city to raise its property taxes by 18 percent to close a $16 million budget shortfall for the 1991–92 fiscal year. Ganim also campaigned on a law and order platform, promising to hire a hundred new city police officers to combat crime. One reason why Ganim was elected was because "there were few politicians who wanted the grief of being mayor of Bridgeport for the paltry salary of $52,000 a year, hence there was not a lot of strong opposition with which Ganim had to contend." When Ganim became Bridgeport's fiftieth mayor, he was the youngest person to hold the office in city history.

As mayor, Ganim began to clean up the city's East End, reducing the area's notorious crime rates, and reclaiming real estate from drug gangs. Under Ganim, the city installed street lights and street signs and planted trees and flowers. In 1992, the city removed a pile of construction debris (labeled "Mount Trashmore") that had been illegally dumped by a demolition business.

==== 1994 gubernatorial candidacy ====
In 1994, three years after becoming mayor, Ganim ran for the Democratic nomination for governor of Connecticut. Ganim withdrew from the race in July 1994, less than a week before the Connecticut Democratic convention, after lagging in the polls, and endorsed John B. Larson, the State Senate president pro tem and the front-runner for the party's nomination.

=== Subsequent terms (second, third, fourth, fifth) ===
In 1997, Ganim defeated Republican challenger Joan K. Magnuson by a huge margin. In that election, Ganim's appearances on taxpayer-funded commercials "boosting his city's image" were criticized by his opponents, who believed that the commercials were tools for re-election.

Under Ganim, the City of Bridgeport joined a number of U.S. cities (others included New Orleans, Miami, and Chicago) to file legal actions against the handgun industry, arguing that they were liable for product liability negligence in failing to use technology to make their products safer, leading to handgun violence. Such suits were inspired by successful litigation against the tobacco industry. The City of Bridgeport's suit was filed in Connecticut Superior Court in January 1999; it named Smith & Wesson, 11 other U.S. firearms manufacturers, three handgun trade associations, and a dozen gun dealers in southwestern Connecticut as defendants. Ganim said that the city's action aimed at "creating law with litigation...That's the route that we're going because [the industry has] always very effectively, with big money, lobbied the legislature and kept laws from being passed." The city sought $100 million in damages for the cost of human life lost and the public cost of treating shooting victims; Ganim said that the city would agree to a settlement, "if the companies will agree to improve the design of their handguns to prevent their misuse." The suit was unsuccessful: the court dismissed for lack of standing in December 1999, and the dismissal was unanimously upheld by the state supreme court in 2001.

In 1999, Ganim was one of three American mayors to receive the City Livability Program Award from the United States Conference of Mayors. The award was conferred for Ganim's "Clean and Green program," which addressed urban decay and blight through a beautification campaign which saw the demolition of more than five buildings and the development of twelve new city parks. A cornerstone of the city's redevelopment efforts was the construction of a new baseball park (The Ballpark at Harbor Yard) for a minor league baseball team, the building of a new arena (Webster Bank Arena), and the redevelopment of industrial land on the city's waterfront. Ganim's term also saw the competition of demolition of Father Panik Village—a housing project notorious for drugs and violent crime; the final fifteen buildings were razed in 1993.

Ganim also benefited personally, however, by collecting kickbacks from developers, eventually leading to his prosecution (see below).

== Conviction on corruption charges ==
On March 19, 2003, Ganim was convicted of 16 federal counts: one count each of racketeering, extortion, racketeering conspiracy, and bribery; two counts of bribery conspiracy; eight counts of mail fraud, and two counts of filing a false tax return. Ganim was acquitted on six other counts. Ganim surrendered his law license upon conviction. Over six years, Ganim engaged in a shakedown of city contractors, accepting more than a half-million dollars; he took bribes in the form of cash, food and wine, clothing, home renovations, and diamonds. In April 2003, two weeks after being convicted, Ganim resigned from office. He was replaced by councilman John M. Fabrizi.

Ganim faced a possible sentence of up to 126 years, $500,000 in restitution, and $4 million in fines. Federal prosecutors asked for a sentence of ten years and one month, while the defense asked for a sentence of no more than three years and ten months. Testimonials seeking leniency were filed with the court on Ganim's behalf, including one from Cardinal Edward M. Egan of New York. On July 1, 2003, U.S. District Judge Janet Bond Arterton sentenced Ganim to nine years in prison and about $300,000 in fines and restitution, in addition to $175,000 that he had previously stipulated that he owed. Judge Arterton said that Ganim's crimes were "stuff that cynicism is made of" and determined by clear and convincing evidence that Ganim had "lied to the jury when he denied any knowledge of fee-splitting deals and other incriminating evidence." Ganim appealed, and the United States Court of Appeals for the Second Circuit upheld Ganim's convictions in December 2007.

=== Federal prison sentence ===
Ganim surrendered in September 2003 and served most of his sentence at FCI Fort Dix in New Jersey. He unsuccessfully petitioned for a transfer to FCI Otisville in New York, to be with his family. In 2009, Ganim was transferred to the FCI McKean prison camp in Pennsylvania. Ganim then served the last seven months of his sentence at a halfway house in Hartford. Ganim's sentence was reduced by a year for participating in a drug-treatment program.

== Return to Bridgeport ==
In July 2010, Ganim was released after serving seven years in prison. After his release, Ganim worked as a legal assistant at his family's law firm in Bridgeport. Ganim and his brother George Ganim Jr. also opened a consulting service, Federal Prison Consultant LLC, which offered other white-collar convicts advice on surviving federal prison terms.

== Disbarment and requests for reinstatement ==
After being released from prison, Ganim also sought restoration of his license to practice law. In 2012, a five-member panel of the State of Connecticut Grievance Committee recommended that Ganim's license be restored. In September 2012, a three-judge panel of Connecticut Superior Court judges rejected the recommendation, writing that: "Allowing an applicant to be readmitted to the practice of law following a conviction on 16 counts of racketeering, conspiracy, extortion, mail fraud, bribery and filing false income tax returns without any apology, expression of remorse, or explanation, and with only a vague acceptance of an unspecified event, simply would set the bar for readmission too low in the state, and we are unwilling to do that." Ganim appealed to the Connecticut Supreme Court in 2014, which unanimously ruled against his effort to have his law license restored. The court cited "the extensiveness" of Ganim's criminal offenses as well as his "failure to acknowledge or explain" them. In 2017, Ganim applied to the U.S. District Court for the District of Connecticut for permission to practice in that federal court without being readmitted to the Connecticut bar; these efforts were rebuffed by the court.

In 2021, Ganim again sought reinstatement of his license to practice law. The Grievance Committee voted, 3–2, to recommend denial of Ganim's request, and in 2023 the Connecticut Superior Court agreed, finding that there was "insufficient" evidence that Ganim was morally fit to practice law.

== Second mayoralty (2015–present) ==
=== 2015 mayoral campaign ===
On January 1, 2015, Ganim offered a public apology to the City of Bridgeport for his corruption scandal, saying: "I'm truly sorry." The apology—as well as visits to churches in the city's mainly African-American east side, a former stronghold for Ganim during his days as mayor—fueled speculation about a return to politics for Ganim. In March 2015, Ganim moved back to Bridgeport from Easton, where he had been living.

In May 2015, Ganim officially entered the race for mayor, filing paperwork to challenge incumbent Democrat Bill Finch as mayor of Bridgeport. Ganim won the endorsement of the Bridgeport police union. Ganim also won the key support of local clergy and the Democratic machine led by Democratic Town Committee chairman Mario Testa.

In September 2015, Ganim won the Democratic primary, making "a big step toward completing an improbable political comeback." Ganim defeated two primary opponents: Finch, the incumbent mayor, and University of Bridgeport vice president Mary–Jane Foster, co-founder of the Bridgeport Bluefish minor-league baseball team. Ganim received 6,264 votes, Finch 5,859, and Foster 1,177.

In the days after the primary election, Finch sought to run in the general election under the "Job Creation Party" ballot line, while Foster announced she would not seek to appear on the general-election ballot as a petitioning candidate. However, Finch's campaign missed a filing deadline, and he dropped out of the race; Foster jumped back into the race, receiving Finch's endorsement.

During his campaign, Ganim promised to reduce taxes, lower crime by adding more police officers, and lower unemployment, which is high in Bridgeport. He managed to persuade Edward Adams, a former FBI agent who helped convict Ganim on corruption charges, to support his campaign. However, Michael Wolf, the FBI special agent-in-charge of Connecticut during the Ganim investigation, fired back with a letter published in the Connecticut Post saying that Adams was not the lead investigator in the Ganim case, and writing that "a mayor who swindled a city he was entrusted to govern, should not be given the opportunity to do it again." Wolf called Ganim the "poster boy" of corrupt Connecticut politicians, a group that included former Governor John G. Rowland, former state Treasurer Paul J. Silvester, and former Bridgeport state Senator Ernest Newton II.

On November 3, 2015, Ganim won election as mayor by a wide margin, defeating Mary Jane Foster (a Democrat running as an unaffiliated candidate) and Republican nominee Enrique Torres, a city councilman. Ganim's successful return to politics has been compared to Marion Barry Jr. of Washington and Vincent A. (Buddy) Cianci, Jr. of Providence, Rhode Island, other mayors who won re-election after criminal convictions. The New York Times reported Ganim's election victory as "a stunning return to public office ... remarkable for its sheer audacity, coming after a widely publicized fall from grace."

=== Sixth term ===
Ganim was sworn in on December 1, 2015.

==== 2018 gubernatorial candidacy ====
In 2017, Ganim filed paperwork creating an exploratory committee to run for governor of Connecticut in 2018. Ganim requested public campaign financing, which in Connecticut is available to qualified candidates. In April 2017, however, the Connecticut Elections Enforcement Commission denied his request due to a state law denying public funding to candidates convicted of "felonies related to public office." Ganim challenged the denial in federal court on constitutional grounds, but the U.S. District Court dismissed his suit in November 2017.

In his campaign against Ned Lamont for the nomination, Ganim unsuccessfully ran as "feisty, in-your-face campaign, which he tried to frame as a city-versus-suburban class struggle." In the August 16, 2018, primary election, Ganim was defeated by a wide margin by Lamont, who received 172,088 votes (81.2%) to Ganim's 39,917 votes (18.8%).

=== Seventh term ===
Ganim was reelected as mayor in 2019, securing a seventh term as mayor.

==== FBI corruption investigation ====
In February 2019, the FBI served a subpoena to Ganim's administration, which was obtained by the Connecticut Post. The subpoena revealed a federal grand jury in New Haven was investigating Ganim's administration for possible municipal corruption. Ganim's administration spent more than $500,000 responding to the criminal probe into Bridgeport, included the fees for private lawyers for multiple government officials including Ganim; the investigation was similar in some respects to FBI's criminal investigation into Ganim's actions as mayor in 2003. In September 2020, the city's Personnel Director and Chief of Police were indicted for wire fraud and making false statements. This was in connection with their conspiracy to rig the 2018 selection of Bridgeport's police chief. Ganim was not accused of any wrongdoing.

==== 2019 Bridgeport Democratic mayoral primary ====
The Connecticut State Election Enforcement Commission began an investigation into possible election-law violations in the 2019 Bridgeport Democratic mayoral primary, which Ganim narrowly won. In August 2023, the Commission recommended that three people tied to Ganim's campaign be criminally charged, forwarding the recommendation to the chief state's attorney.

In June of 2024, four individuals were arrested and charged with violations of elections law, including possession of absentee ballots: two campaign workers, as well as Bridgeport Democratic Town Committee Vice Chairperson Wanda Geter-Pataky and Democratic City Council Member Alfredo Castillo, both of whom would subsequently be arrested and charged with similar crimes resulting from their actions in the 2023 mayoral Democratic primary. Prosecutors said the defendants variously directed voters for whom to vote, were present as the voters filled out their absentee ballots, and violated rules for handling absentee ballots and the applications to request them. Geter-Pataky and the campaign workers were also charged with witness tampering.

==== Violation of public records law ====
From 2012 through 2021, the Connecticut Freedom of Information Commission (FOIC) determined that the City of Bridgeport had violated the Connecticut Freedom of Information Act (FOIA) 28 times. Although Bridgeport makes up only 4% of Connecticut's population, it was responsible for 17% of all FOIA violations as determined by FOIC. In August 2022, a FOIC commissioner said that Bridgeport officials had "continually" engaged in an "ongoing pattern" of failing to comply with law. The Commission fined the city $750 for failing to comply with the law.

An investigation by Hearst Connecticut Media in early 2023 found that, during Ganim's tenure as mayor, the City of Bridgeport routinely failed to comply with the Connecticut FOIA; routinely stonewalled public-records requests (sometimes delaying responses up to two years), and had a backlog of more than 2,000 pending requests. The report also found that city leaders had "inexplicably abandoned their own proposals" to clear the backlog and expedite processing. Ganim's administration contended that the high backlog was caused in part by the city's introduction of a new "user-friendly public portal" that facilitated the submission of more FOIA requests than before.

==== 2023 mayoral Democratic primary and general election ====
In the September 2023 Democratic primary for the Bridgeport mayoral race, Ganim was initially declared the winner, defeating his opponent, former Bridgeport chief administrative officer John Gomes, by 251 votes out of 8,173 cast. Gomes successfully challenged the race in Connecticut Superior Court. After a three-day trial, in which surveillance video footage, showing two women stuffing white envelopes into outdoor absentee ballot drop boxes, was introduced into evidence, Judge William Clark invalidated the Democratic mayoral primary results, and ordered a new Democratic primary to be held. Gomes' lawyer tallied the submission of 1,253 absentee ballots, despite surveillance videos only showing 420 people using the boxes. Judge Clark found that two women were directly involved in 15 incidents of ballot stuffing, that both were "partisans" for Ganim, and that the ballot-stuffing episodes were "shocking" and "conscious acts with partisan purpose" rather than random. Ganim denied any involvement in ballot-stuffing. Because the judge had no authority to postpone the general election, the general election took place as scheduled in November 2023, before a second Democratic primary was scheduled. The New York Times described the Bridgeport election as perhaps "the most confusing election in the country" due to the legal uncertainties surrounding the race.

After the September 2023 primary irregularities, the state oversaw the Bridgeport general election, appointing an election monitor as well as attorneys from the Secretary of the State's Office to oversee the pickup of ballots from drop boxes and the counting of votes. The state also submitted a request from Bridgeport police for surveillance video footage of ballot drop-box.

The general election included four candidates for mayor: Ganim, Gomes (who ran on the Independent Party of Connecticut ballot line), Republican David Herz, and "petitioning candidate" (unaffiliated) Lamond Daniels. Ganim's campaign raised just under $579,000, while Gomes' campaign raised about $365,000. In the November 2023 election, Ganim was declared the winner: Ganim received 5,729 votes, Gomes 5,550, Daniels 1,836, and Herz 765. Under the city charter, a mayor's new term would have begun on December 1, 2023. However, because the results of the 2023 mayoral election were not certified, Ganim was not sworn in on December 1, 2023, but, pursuant to the city charter, continued in office until the election do-over could be completed and the election result could be certified.

After the Superior Court's order, negotiations on a new primary election date took place between the Ganim, Gomes, and the Secretary of the State's Office; the three sides ultimately agreed to recommend to the court new election dates. The court accepted the recommendations and set a new primary for January 23, 2024, and a new general election on February 27, 2024. Ganim won the new primary by 1,077 votes, or 12% and the new general election by 20-point margin, securing his third consecutive four-year term.

In February 2025, five individuals were arrested and criminally charged with violations of elections law relating to absentee ballots during the 2023 election; while voters were filling in their absentee ballots, they were allegedly present, lied to the voters about absentee ballot laws, and pressured the voters to choose specific candidates. Two of the five, prominent Bridgeport Democratic political operatives City Councilman Alfredo Castillo and Town Committee Vice Chair Wanda Geter-Pataky, had been arrested and charged less than a year before for similar crimes resulting from their actions during the 2019 mayoral primary.

== Personal life ==
=== Family life ===
In 1993, Ganim (then the 33-year-old mayor of Bridgeport) married Ellen Jennifer White, known as Jennifer. The couple wed at the St. Augustine Cathedral in Bridgeport in a ceremony performed by Bishop Edward M. Egan (later cardinal) of the Roman Catholic Diocese of Bridgeport. They have three children.

In 2014, the couple divorced. In 2015, a Connecticut Superior Court judge agreed to Ganim's request for a reduction in Ganim's alimony payments he sought on the basis of his low income and lack of business in his consulting job.

Ganim's brother Paul is serving as the probate judge in Bridgeport, having first been elected in 1999.

=== Residence ===
In May 2023, Ganim sold his home in the Black Rock neighborhood of Bridgeport for $1.13 million, three times what he paid to purchase the property two years earlier, and purchased a condo in Black Rock.

In November 2023, one week before Election Day, the Connecticut State Elections Enforcement Commission voted unanimously to investigate a complaint, submitted by a former Bridgeport city employee, that alleges that Ganim is not a resident of Bridgeport. The complaint alleges that Ganim actually lives in a three-acre home in Easton, Connecticut, which he owns. Ganim called the complaint "ridiculous" and said that he lived in his condo in the city.

== Sources ==
- Rob Sullivan, Political Corruption in Bridgeport: Scandal in the Park City (The History Press: 2014)

Party political offices
Preceded by Sandra Bender	Democratic nominee for Lieutenant Governor of Connecticut; 1994	Succeeded by Joe Courtney
Political offices
Preceded by Mary C. Moran	Mayor of Bridgeport; 1991–2003	Succeeded by John M. Fabrizi
Preceded by Bill Finch	Mayor of Bridgeport; 2015–present	Incumbent
