= William J. Lavery =

American politician (1938–2024)

Member of the Connecticut House of Representatives from the 136th district
- In office 1967–1971
- Preceded by: Seat established
- Succeeded by: Leonard S. Paoletta

Judge of the Connecticut Appellate Court
- In office October 4, 1989 – November 1, 2007
- Nominated by: William A. O'Neill

Personal details
- Born: March 26, 1938 New Haven, Connecticut, U.S.
- Died: November 14, 2024 (aged 86) Newtown, Connecticut, U.S.
- Party: Democratic

William J. Lavery (March 26, 1938 – November 14, 2024) was an American politician and jurist from the state of Connecticut. He was appointed judge of the Connecticut Appellate Court on October 4, 1989, Chief Judge on March 12, 2000, and Chief Court Administrator on February 1, 2006, retiring on November 1, 2007.

== Early life and education ==
Lavery was born in New Haven, Connecticut, on March 26, 1938. He graduated from Fairfield Prep in 1955; received his bachelor's degree from Fairfield University in 1959; and received his law degree from Fordham Law School.

== Career ==
While in private practice, Lavery was elected to the Bridgeport Board of Aldermen (1963–1967) and the Connecticut House of Representatives (1967–1971). He was a Democrat. Throughout the 1970s, he served as counsel for the Bridgeport Housing Authority, the Majority Party in the Connecticut House of Representatives, and the Town of Newtown, Connecticut. He was vice-chairman of the Connecticut Commission on Hospitals and Healthcare and a member of the State's Council on Environmental Quality.

In 1981, Lavery was appointed a Connecticut Superior Court judge and served as presiding judge in the Danbury Judicial District and chief administrative judge in Waterbury Judicial District prior to his appointment to the Connecticut Appellate Court.

== Death ==
Lavery died at his home in Newtown, Connecticut, on November 14, 2024, at the age of 86.
