= Connecticut's 136th House of Representatives district =

American legislative district

Connecticut's 136th State House of Representatives district
Representative
Jonathan Steinberg; D

Connecticut's 136th House of Representatives district elects one member of the Connecticut House of Representatives. It encompasses parts of Westport and has been represented by Democrat Jonathan Steinberg since 2011.

== List of representatives ==
List of Representatives from Connecticut's 136th State House District
Representative	Party	Years	District home	Note
William J. Lavery	Democratic	1967–1971	Bridgeport	Seat created
Leonard S. Paoletta	Republican	1971–1973	Bridgeport	
Alan Harris Nevas	Republican	1973–1977	Westport	
Julie Belaga	Republican	1977–1987	Westport	
Josephine Fuchs	Republican	1987–1997	Westport	
G. Kenneth Bernhard	Republican	1997–2005	Westport	
Joe Mioli	Democratic	2005–2011	Westport	
Jonathan Steinberg	Democratic	2011–	Westport	
Lee Goldstein	Democratic	2027 member-elect		

== Recent elections ==
=== 2020 ===
2020 Connecticut State House of Representatives election, District 136
Party	Candidate	Votes	%
Democratic	Jonathan Steinberg (incumbent)	10,567	66.51
Republican	Chip Stephens	5,322	33.49
Total votes		15,889	100.00
Democratic hold			

=== 2018 ===
2018 Connecticut House of Representatives election, District 136
Party	Candidate	Votes	%
Democratic	Jonathan Steinberg (Incumbent)	7,945	61.3
Republican	Greg Kraut	5,008	38.7
Total votes		12,953	100.00
Democratic hold			

=== 2016 ===
2016 Connecticut House of Representatives election, District 136
Party	Candidate	Votes	%
Democratic	Jonathan Steinberg (Incumbent)	8,029	57.66
Republican	Catherine Walsh	5,895	42.34
Total votes		13,924	100.00
Democratic hold			

=== 2014 ===
2014 Connecticut House of Representatives election, District 136
Party	Candidate	Votes	%
Democratic	Jonathan Steinberg (Incumbent)	5,009	55.0
Republican	Brandi Briggs	3,887	42.7
Independent Party	Brandi Briggs	216	2.4
Total votes		9,112	100.00
Democratic hold			

=== 2012 ===
2012 Connecticut House of Representatives election, District 136
Party	Candidate	Votes	%
Democratic	Jonathan Steinberg (Incumbent)	7,398	56.3
Republican	Stephen Rubin	5,740	43.7
Total votes		13,138	100.00
Democratic hold			
