= Christopher F. Droney =

American judge (born 1954)

Christopher Droney
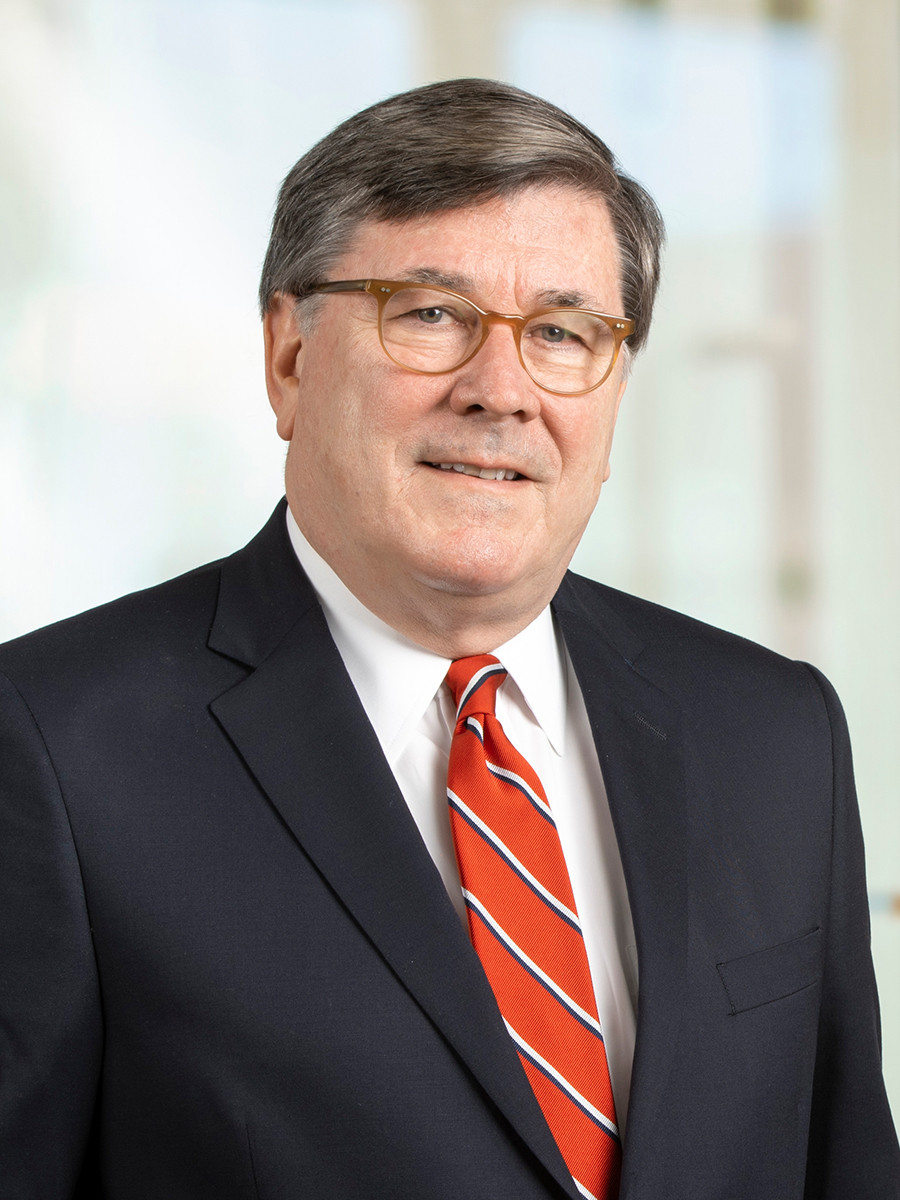
- Droney in 2012

Senior Judge of the United States Court of Appeals for the Second Circuit
- In office June 30, 2019 – January 2, 2020

Judge of the United States Court of Appeals for the Second Circuit
- In office December 1, 2011 – June 30, 2019
- Appointed by: Barack Obama
- Preceded by: Guido Calabresi
- Succeeded by: William J. Nardini

Judge of the United States District Court for the District of Connecticut
- In office September 18, 1997 – December 1, 2011
- Appointed by: Bill Clinton
- Preceded by: Alan Harris Nevas
- Succeeded by: Michael P. Shea

United States Attorney for the District of Connecticut
- In office 1993–1997
- President: Bill Clinton
- Preceded by: Stanley Twardy
- Succeeded by: Stephen C. Robinson

Personal details
- Born: Christopher Fitzgerald Droney; June 22, 1954 (age 72) Hartford, Connecticut, U.S.
- Education: College of the Holy Cross (BA); University of Connecticut (JD)

Christopher Fitzgerald Droney (born June 22, 1954) is an American lawyer who served as a federal circuit judge of the United States Court of Appeals for the Second Circuit from 2011 to 2020. He was previously a judge of the United States District Court for the District of Connecticut from 1997 to 2011.

== Early life and education ==
Droney was born on June 22, 1954, in Hartford, Connecticut. He was raised in neighboring West Hartford and was one of four children of John F. Droney and Christine Anne (née Fitzgerald) Droney, who had moved to West Hartford after World War II. His older brother John F. Droney Jr. later became a prominent Connecticut trial lawyer and served as the chairman of the Connecticut Democratic Party.

Droney graduated from the College of the Holy Cross in Worcester, Massachusetts, with a Bachelor of Arts in history, magna cum laude, in 1976. As an undergraduate at Holy Cross, he was elected to Alpha Sigma Nu, the Jesuit honor society, and Phi Alpha Theta. During the summer after his graduation, Droney worked as a laborer at a Heublein bottling plant in Hartford. He then earned his Juris Doctor (J.D.) in 1976 from the University of Connecticut School of Law, where he was the notes and comments editor of the Connecticut Law Review.

== Early career ==
Droney was in private practice in Hartford from 1979 to 1993, and was also deputy mayor of West Hartford from 1983 to 1985, and then Mayor of West Hartford from 1985 to 1989. He was the United States Attorney for the District of Connecticut from 1993 to 1997.

== Federal judicial service ==
On June 5, 1997, Droney was nominated by President Bill Clinton to a seat on the United States District Court for the District of Connecticut vacated by Alan Harris Nevas. Droney was confirmed unanimously by the United States Senate on September 11, 1997, and received his commission on September 18, 1997. His service as a district judge was terminated on December 1, 2011 when he was elevated to the court of appeals.

On May 4, 2011, President Barack Obama nominated Droney to serve on the United States Court of Appeals for the Second Circuit to replace Judge Guido Calabresi, who assumed senior status in 2009. On November 28, 2011, the United States Senate confirmed his nomination by a 88–0 vote. He received his commission on December 1, 2011. On April 15, 2019, Droney announced that he would assume senior status, beginning June 30, 2019. In August 2019, Droney announced that he would retire from the bench in January 2020 and resume private practice. He retired on January 2, 2020 and rejoined a law firm, Day Pitney. On March 13, 2023, he left Day Pitney to create his own law firm, Droney Law in West Hartford.

From 2021 to 2026 Droney served as the System Arbitrator for the National Football League.

=== Notable cases ===
As a United States District Judge, Droney presided over such matters as a multi-district class action involving RICO and fraud charges in the national food service industry, the first sex trafficking criminal jury trial under the then-new federal child sex trafficking statutes, and the return of the famous television puppet Howdy Doody from private parties to the museum at the Detroit Institute of Arts.

While on the Court of Appeals, Droney authored the Ragbir opinion, which held that immigrants could not be deported in retaliation for their protected First Amendment speech, Littlejohn v. City of New York, which eased the pleading standard for federal employment discrimination claims, and Force v. Facebook, 934 F. 3d 53 (2d Cir. 2019), which recognized immunity of internet computer service providers under section 230 of the Communications Decency Act for information posted by third parties. He also provided the deciding vote for the Second Circuit in Windsor v. United States, which held that the Equal Protection Clause guaranteed the right of same-sex couples to marry, which was affirmed by the United States Supreme Court. He also dissented from the denial of en banc in the Microsoft email case, arguing that federal prosecutors could obtain emails of Microsoft customers that were stored abroad. Droney also joined in the Knight First Amendment Institute v. Trump opinion, which held that the President's Twitter account was a First Amendment-protected public forum and the President could not block unfavorable comments from that account, the panel opinion in CREW v. Trump, which held that the suit could proceed against President Trump for violation of the Constitution's emoluments clause for his profits from his hotels and restaurants, as well as the Vance v. Trump opinion, which held that the President's personal tax returns were not immune from production in response to a state grand jury subpoena. He also joined the opinion which required the disclosure of the Jeffrey Epstein court documents.

Legal offices
Preceded by Stanley Twardy	United States Attorney for the District of Connecticut; 1993–1997	Succeeded by Stephen C. Robinson
Preceded by Alan Harris Nevas	Judge of the United States District Court for the District of Connecticut; 1997–2011	Succeeded by Michael P. Shea
Preceded by Guido Calabresi	Judge of the United States Court of Appeals for the Second Circuit; 2011–2019	Succeeded by William J. Nardini
