= John Droney =

Connecticut politician (1946–2026)

John F. Droney Jr. (October 8, 1946 – July 19, 2026) was an American politician and lawyer in the state of Connecticut. As chair of the Connecticut Democratic Party, he organized Joe Lieberman's upset 1988 victory over Lowell Weicker and supported Lieberman during his independent run in 2006. He was also the senior partner of Levy & Droney, a law firm based in Farmington, Connecticut until it dissolved in 2012.

== Early life and education ==
Droney was born in West Hartford, Connecticut, on October 8, 1946. He graduated from the College of the Holy Cross, before serving in Vietnam as an army medic in Pleiku; afterwards he went to the University of Connecticut School of Law to complete his law degree.

== Career ==
Droney served as chair of the Connecticut Democratic Party from 1986 to 1992, having been picked for the position by Governor William O'Neill. During his tenure, the Democrats managed to win the 1988 Senate race where Lieberman defeated Weicker, as well as retain control of Connecticut's state legislature through all three election cycles Droney was chairman (1986, 1988, and 1990). However, despite Droney's efforts, the Democrats lost control of Connecticut's governorship in 1990 when candidate Bruce Morrison came last in a three-way race. He also served as a member of the Democratic National Committee and was co-chair of the Bill Clinton-Al Gore campaign in Connecticut.

In 2006, Droney was a vocal supporter of Lieberman when he was challenged by Ned Lamont for the Democratic nomination for Senate. Early in the year he had publicly urged Lieberman to forgo the Democratic primary altogether and seek reelection as an independent candidate; the strategy was vindicated when Lieberman indeed won on his new Connecticut for Lieberman ticket.

== Personal life and death ==
Droney died on July 19, 2026, at the age of 79.

His brother, Christopher F. Droney, is a judge on the United States Court of Appeals for the Second Circuit.
