= Christine Niedermeier =

American politician

Member of the Connecticut House of Representatives from the 134th district
- In office 1979–1987
- Preceded by: Jacquelyn Durrell
- Succeeded by: Sidney Postol

Personal details
- Party: Democratic
- Education: Georgetown University; Georgetown University Law Center

Christine Marie Niedermeier (born 1950 or 1951) is an American attorney and politician who served in the Connecticut House of Representatives from 1979 to 1987, representing the 134th district as a Democrat. She lived in Fairfield during her tenure. Niedermeier graduated from Georgetown University with a degree in government and earned her Juris Doctor degree from Georgetown University Law Center. She was an associate at the Stamford office of Winthrop, Stimson, Putnam & Roberts. In 1986, Niedermeier ran to represent Connecticut's 4th congressional district in the U.S. Congress. She was defeated by Republican candidate Stewart McKinney, who subsequently died in office in May 1987. Niedermeier ran to succeed him in the following special election, but was defeated by Chris Shays.
