= John C. Mandanici =

American politician (1918–1986)

47th Mayor of Bridgeport, Connecticut
- In office November 10, 1975 – November 9, 1981
- Preceded by: William Seres
- Succeeded by: Leonard S. Paoletta

Personal details
- Born: January 1, 1918 Bridgeport, Connecticut, U.S.
- Died: January 7, 1986 (aged 68) Bridgeport, Connecticut, U.S.
- Party: Democratic
- Spouse: Mary Grace Mullins
- Children: 4

John C. Mandanici Sr. (January 1, 1918 – January 7, 1986) was an American politician who served three terms as the mayor of Bridgeport, Connecticut, the largest city in the U.S. state of Connecticut.

== Early life and career before politics ==
John C. Mandanici Sr. was born on New Year's Day 1918, in the Hollow neighborhood of Bridgeport, to a Sicilian American family that had settled in the city ten years earlier. He attended Bridgeport Central High School, where one of his classmate was Joseph Walshs, the future superintendent of the Bridgeport police; both would later rise to become the city's two most powerful people.

Mandanici worked for the A&P supermarket in downtown Bridgeport for nearly 40 years before entering politics. He started as a grocery clerk and rose to become store manager. Mandanici became active in the local Democratic Party and served on the zoning board.

== Political career and mayoralty ==
Mandanici entered citywide politics for the first time in 1969, when he became Bridgeport city clerk.

In 1975, Mandanici was elected mayor with 63 percent of the vote, defeating Republican Richard S. Scalo. He succeeded interim mayor William Seres, who had replaced former mayor Nicholas Panuzio. As mayor, Mandanici is credited with starting Captain's Cove, the city's public marina.

Mandanici "maintained an iron control of city politics until 1981, when he was narrowly defeated by Republican Leonard S. Paoletta after scandal rocked his administration." In that election, "Mandanici was at the center of a federal investigation into corruption in Bridgeport City Hall." Mandanici was never implicated or indicted in connection with the corruption scandals, but more than a dozen members of his administration were convicted on state or Federal corruption charges." From 1977 to January 1983, nineteen associates of Mandanici or administration officials were indicted on corruption charges, such as perjury, fraud, and misapplication of federal money. At that time, eleven had pleaded guilty, three were convicted following jury trials, a judge dismissed charges against one, and four (including Mandanici's son John C. "Buddy" Mandanici) were awaiting trial. Mandanci Jr. was convicted in May 1983 by a jury in the U.S. District Court in New Haven of three charges of fraud in connection with a federal housing subsidy application that he had filed with the U.S. Department of Housing and Urban Development; he was acquitted on a fourth charge of lying to a bank officer. Judge Robert C. Zampano sentenced Mandanci Jr. to a five-year suspended sentence, a $20,000 fine, and three years' probation.

Mandanici Sr.'s "biggest antagonist" during this period was Richard Blumenthal–then the U.S. Attorney for the District of Connecticut—who aggressively pursued Mandanici. Blumenthal later became Connecticut Attorney General and then U.S. senator.

In the highly contentious 1981 campaign, Mandanici was the target of death threats and wore a bulletproof vest while campaigning. According to one author, the election of 1981 was "without question" the "wildest election" in city history, a clash "between two bombastic politicians with hard-charging styles"—Mandanici and Paoletta—"who did not much care for each other." In that campaign, a car was firebombed outside the city Republican headquarters and two cars were blown up in Mandanici's driveway. Mandanici lost the election by just 64 votes. His loss was attributed to the federal indictments as well as Mandanici's unpopular demand for a 50% pay raise, which the common council approved.

In 1982, the state Elections Commission fined Mandanici $800 for establishing an illegal campaign committee and soliciting funds for it the previous year. Mandanici's son John C. Mandinici Jr., the special committee chairman Mario Testa, and the special committee treasurer George H. Farrell Jr., along with several Bridgeport-area businesses, were also fined. The fines were levied as part of an agreement with the Commission, absolving the parties of any intentional violation of the law.

In 1983, Mandanici unsuccessfully attempted to make a comeback as mayor. He failed to win the Democratic nomination and ran as an independent candidate instead. In 1985, Mandanici again sought election as mayor but was defeated in the Democratic primary.

== Death ==
Mandanici died on January 7, 1986, at St. Vincent's Medical Center in Bridgeport, at age 68.

== Family ==
John C. Mandanici Sr., had two sons: Francis Mandanici, who became a public defender in Bridgeport, and John C. Mandanici Jr, a former Connecticut State Trooper. He also had two daughters, Marylou Mandanici who was a 7th grade school teacher and Cecilia Mandanici who also became a school teacher in Bridgeport at Black Rock School and taught kindergarten.
