= List of mayors of Bridgeport, Connecticut =

The Mayor is the chief executive of Bridgeport, Connecticut who is directly elected for a four-year term. They have the power to issue executive orders, declare emergencies, submit a yearly budget to the city council and makes appointments to city government offices.

As of July 2012, the Mayor of Bridgeport earns an annual salary of $132,459.

== List of mayors ==
Name	In office	Party	Notes	Reference
Isaac Sherman	1836–1837			
Daniel Sterling	1837–1838			
Alanson Hamlin	1838–1839			
Charles Foote	1839			
Charles Bostwick	1840			
William Burrall	1841–1842?			
James Chaffee Loomis	1843–1844	Democratic		
Henry Harral	1844–1847			
Sherwood Sterling	1847–1849			
Henry Harral	1849–1851			
John Brooks	1851–1852			
Henry Harral	1852–1853			
Charles Hubbell	1853–1854			
John Brook	1854–1855			
Philo Calhoun	1855–1858	Democratic		
Silas Booth	1858–1860			
Daniel Sterling	1860–1863			
Clapp Spooner	1863–1864	Republican		
Jarratt Morford	1864–1865			
Stillman Clapp	1865–1866			
Monson Hawley	1866–1868			
Jarratt Morford	1868–1869			
Monson Hawley	1869–1870			
Jarratt Morford	1870–1871			
Epaphras Goodsell	1871–1874	Democratic		
Robert Clarke	1874–1875			
Phineas Barnum	1875–1876	Republican		
Jarratt Morford	1876–1878			
Robert De Forest	1878–1879	Democratic		
John Wessells	1879–1880			
Daniel Morgan	1880–1881	Democratic		
John Wessells	1881–1882			
Carlos Curtis	1882–1883			
John Wessells	1883–1884			
Daniel Morgan	1884–1885			
Henry Pyle	1885–1886			
Civilion Fones	1886–1888		A dentist, his son Alfred Fones was also a dentist and a leader in early oral hygiene and education.	
Patrick Coughlin	1888–1889			
Robert De Forest	1889–1891	Democratic		
William Marigold	1891–1893	Republican		
Walter Bostwick	1893–1895			
Frank Clark	1895–1897	Democratic		
Thomas Taylor	1897–1899	Republican		
Hugh Stirling	1899–1901	Republican		
Denis Mulvihill	1901–1905	Democratic		
Marcus Reynolds	1905–1907			
Henry Lee	1907–1909			
Edward Buckingham	1909–1911	Democratic		
Clifford Wilson	1911–1921	Republican		
Fred Atwater	1921–1923	Democratic		
William Behrens	1923–1929	Republican		
Edward Buckingham	1929–1933	Democratic		
Jasper McLevy	1933–1957	Socialist	Longest-serving mayor	
Samuel Tedesco	1957–1965	Democratic		
Hugh Curran	1965–1971	Democratic		
Nicholas Panuzio	1971–1975	Republican	Resigned toward the end of his second term to serve as deputy administrator of the General Services Administration in the Gerald Ford administration	
William Seres	1975	Republican	President of the Common Council who succeeded as mayor following Panuzio's resignation; served 55 days	
John C. Mandanici	1975–1981	Democratic		
Lenny Paoletta	1981–1985	Republican		
Thomas Bucci	1985–1989	Democratic		
Mary Moran	1989–1991	Republican	First and only woman to serve as Bridgeport mayor; last Republican to serve as Bridgeport mayor; unsuccessfully sought to have city declared insolvent in municipal bankruptcy	
Joe Ganim	1991–2003	Democratic	Second-longest serving Bridgeport mayor; was convicted on federal corruption charges in 2003; spent seven years in prison.	
John Fabrizi	2003–2007	Democratic	Did not run for a second term in 2007 after admitting to a drinking problem and use of cocaine while in office.	
Bill Finch	2007–2015	Democratic	Defeated by Joseph P. Ganim during the Democratic primary in September 2015.	
Joe Ganim	2015–present	Democratic	Second-longest serving Bridgeport mayor; was convicted on federal corruption charges in 2003; spent seven years in prison; re-elected to office November 3, 2015; Sworn in on December 1, 2015.	
