= Leonard S. Paoletta =

American lawyer and politician (born 1934)

Leonard Paoletta

48th Mayor of Bridgeport, Connecticut
- In office 1981–1985
- Preceded by: John C. Mandanici
- Succeeded by: Thomas W. Bucci

Member of the Connecticut House of Representatives from the 136th district
- In office January 6, 1971 – January 3, 1973
- Preceded by: William J. Lavery
- Succeeded by: Alan Harris Nevas

Personal details
- Born: November 9, 1934 (age 92) Bridgeport, Connecticut, U.S.
- Party: Republican
- Education: Fairfield University (BA); Georgetown University (JD)

Leonard S. "Lenny" Paoletta (born November 9, 1934) is an American lawyer and former mayor of Bridgeport, Connecticut from 1981 to 1985. He was a Republican. Earlier in his career, he served in the Connecticut House of Representatives in the 1970s.

== Early life and education ==
Paoletta was born in Bridgeport, Connecticut, on November 9, 1934. He is a second-generation Italian-American.

Paoletta graduated from Warren Harding High School. He then received his bachelor's degree from Fairfield University, where he was a member of the Fairfield Stags men's basketball team, and his J.D. degree from Georgetown University Law School. He was admitted to the bar in Connecticut in 1959.

== Political career ==
=== Early political career ===
Paoletta first ran for the Connecticut State Senate in 1962, but lost the general election to Louis Gladstone. He served in the Connecticut House of Representatives in the 1970s.

In 1979, Paoletta ran unsuccessfully for mayor of Bridgeport against Democratic incumbent John C. Mandanici, although Paoletta held Mandanici to his smallest margin of victory in his three elections.

=== Mayor of Bridgeport ===
In 1981, Paoletta (then age 48) again challenged Mandanici and was successful, narrowly edging out the incumbent by just 64 votes (17,950 to 17,886 votes, following a recount). The New York Times reported at the time that "In what is virtually a trademark of Bridgeport politics, the mayoral campaign was held against a backdrop of violence and bizarre incidents." Paoletta was sworn in on his 47th birthday, becoming Bridgeport's 47th elected mayor.

In 1983, Paoletta won reelection, defeating both Democratic challenger Charles B. Tisdale and Mandanici (who ran under the third party "Taxpayers Party" ballot line after losing the Democratic primary election to Tisdale). Paoletta received 15,606 votes, Tisdale 14,358 votes, and Mandanici 9,728 votes.

As mayor, Paoletta clashed with Joseph A. Walsh, who had been Bridgeport's superintendent of police for 22 years. Walsh had been a colorful and controversial figure in the city for many years. In December 1983, at Paoletta's urging, the city's Board of Police Commissioners voted 6-0 to force Walsh into retirement. Paoletta immediately appointed Thomas Thear, the former police chief of Battle Creek, Michigan, to be the interim leader of Bridgeport's 420-member police department. Walsh subsequently challenged his dismissal, and the Bridgeport Civil Service Commission ordered his reinstatement.

According to the New York Times, "two burly detectives, acting under orders from the Mayor, blocked him from entering his office. The dispute then shifted to the courts and a lengthy hearing on 185 charges of misconduct that the city drew up against the superintendent." In mid-1984, a state trial referee ruled that "no just cause" existed for Walsh's dismissal. During the seven-month standoff between Walsh and Paoletta, the police commissioners assumed day-to-day control of the police department for a time. Walsh returned to work in July 1984, after an "uneasy truce" took hold.

=== 1985 election and later political career ===
In 1985, Paoletta was defeated in the general election by Democratic candidate Thomas W. (Tom) Bucci. In September 1989, Paoletta ran in a seven-way Republican primary for mayor, but came in second place, losing by 32 votes to Mary C. Moran, who went on to win the general election and become mayor.

In 1997, Governor John G. Rowland named him as a member of Connecticut's Workers' Compensation Commission.

== Post-mayoralty ==
In the 1990s, Paoletta was a lawyer with Seeley & Berglass, which has offices in New Haven and Fairfield. In 1994, Paoletta moved to Easton, Connecticut. The same year, Paoletta unsuccessfully ran for probate judge.

In September 1994, Paoletta (then 59 years old) was shot on the steps of Holy Rosary Roman Catholic Church School in Bridgeport in an apparently random shooting; a priest and a parishioner were also shot. Paoletta was seriously wounded but recovered following emergency surgery at Bridgeport Hospital.
