= Smoking in Korea =

Smoking in Korea can refer to:

- Smoking in North Korea
- Smoking in South Korea
