= Senator Burgin =

Senator Burgin may refer to:

- Jim Burgin (born 1956), North Carolina State Senate
- Thomas S. Burgin (1902–1986), Massachusetts State Senate
- William G. Burgin (1924–2002), Mississippi State Senate
- William O. Burgin (1877–1946), North Carolina State Senate

== See also ==
- Frank Bergin (1886–1971), Connecticut State Senate
