= Mary Hooker =

American politician (1864–1939)

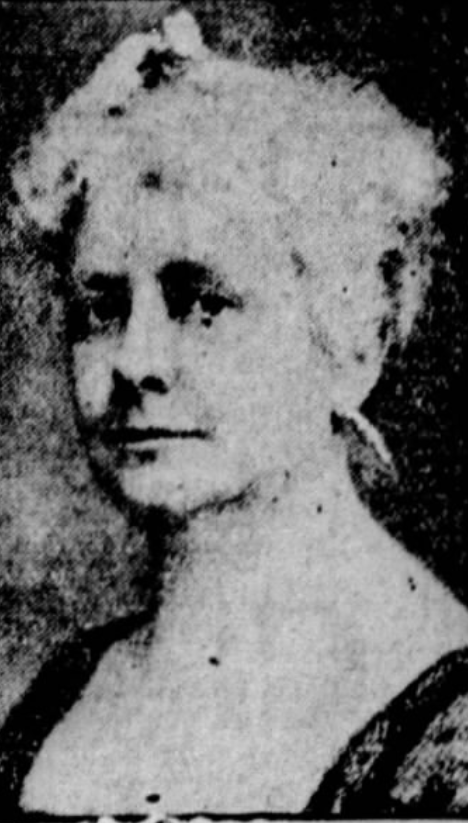

Member of the Connecticut House of Representatives from Hartford
- In office 1921–1923 Serving with John T. Dunn Jr.
- Preceded by: William B. Green; T. J. Cummings
- Succeeded by: Raymond M. Marlowe; Louis M. Schatz
- In office 1925–1927 Serving with Louis A. Samuels
- Preceded by: Raymond M. Marlowe; Louis M. Schatz
- Succeeded by: Mary Wiedman; Albert Newfield

Personal details
- Born: February 26, 1864 Philadelphia, Pennsylvania, U.S.
- Died: May 13, 1939 (aged 75) Hartford, Connecticut, U.S.
- Party: Republican
- Spouse: Edward W. Hooker (m. 1888; died 1915)
- Children: 2

Mary Mather Turner Hooker (February 26, 1864 – May 13, 1939) was an American politician who served in the Connecticut House of Representatives from 1921 to 1923 and 1925 to 1927, representing the city of Hartford as a Republican. She was among the first five women to serve in the Connecticut General Assembly, taking office in the first state legislative session following the ratification of the Nineteenth Amendment.

== Personal life ==
Hooker was born on February 26, 1864, in Philadelphia, Pennsylvania. In 1888, she married Edward W. Hooker, who would later serve as mayor of Hartford, Connecticut and in the Connecticut General Assembly. They moved to Hartford in 1889, and together, they had a son and a daughter. The two were married until Edward's death in 1915. Both Edward and Mary were separately descended from Thomas Hooker (1586–1647), a founder of Hartford.

Hooker died on May 13, 1939, at Hartford Hospital. She was 75.

== Political career ==
=== Board of education ===
Though women would not have the right to hold state office or vote in state elections until 1920, Connecticut law provided an exception for women to vote and run for boards of education beginning in 1893, and Hooker began her political career in 1915 on the Hartford Board of Education. Her husband, Edward W. Hooker, had served in the position until his death, and she was named to complete his unexpired term. In 1918, she ran for and was elected to the position independently.

In 1921, Hooker stated that while she had previously opposed women's suffrage, "after I was elected to the board of education, I felt that I was not only inconsistent but wrong to oppose the ballot for women."

=== Connecticut House of Representatives ===
A Republican, Hooker was elected to the Connecticut House of Representatives in 1920, the first year in which women could vote and run for state office, and thus was among the first five women to serve in the Connecticut General Assembly. She served one term representing the city of Hartford alongside John T. Dunn Jr. She unsuccessfully ran for reelection in 1922, and she and Dunn were succeeded by Raymond M. Marlowe and Louis M. Schatz.

Hooker was again elected to represent Hartford in 1924, and she served from 1925 to 1927 alongside Louis A. Samuels. Hooker was not a candidate for reelection in 1926 and was succeeded by Mary Wiedman and Albert Newfield.

On January 5, 1921, the first day of the 1921 session, Hooker became the first woman legislator to speak on the House floor when she said, "Mr Speaker, I did not expect that my maiden speech in the House would be upon tobacco, but I desire to say that I trust the gentlemen of the House will keep on smoking, if they desire, just as if there were no women members". In the 1920s, it was considered taboo for women to smoke and for men to smoke in front of women, and there had been significant discussion over the issue among House members, with Representative W. L. Higgins of Coventry having considered the introduction of an edict to ban smoking in the House.
