= J. Agnes Burns =

American attorney and politician (died 1952)

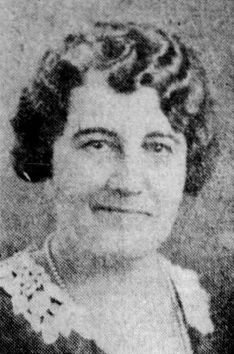

Member of the Connecticut House of Representatives from Hartford
- In office 1931–1937
- Preceded by: Marian Roberts; John A. Markham
- Succeeded by: Ernest T. Racicot; Thomas F. Leavy

Personal details
- Born: Terryville, Connecticut, U.S.
- Died: March 6, 1952 Hartford, Connecticut, U.S.
- Party: Democratic
- Education: Hartford College of Law

J. Agnes Burns (died March 6, 1952) was an American attorney and politician from Connecticut. She was the first woman to graduate from the Hartford College of Law and the first woman to present a case to the Connecticut Supreme Court. From 1931 to 1937, she was a member of the Connecticut House of Representatives, representing the city of Hartford as a Democrat.

== Personal life and education ==
Burns was born in Terryville, Connecticut, to John and Johanna Kilmartin Burns. She had two sisters and a brother. Burns graduated from Hartford College of Law (later absorbed by the University of Connecticut as the University of Connecticut School of Law) in 1924, the first woman to do so. Burns was admitted to the bar in 1925.

== Legal career ==
While attending the Hartford College of Law, Burns worked as a law clerk and assistant to Judge William F. Henney, a former mayor of Hartford. Following her admission to the bar on January 20, 1925, she became an associate of Henney's legal practice, a position she maintained until Henney's death in 1928. Burns later operated her own private law practice in Hartford.

In a 1935 address at the Hartford College of Law, Burns expressed opposition to the concept of limited bar admission. During the Great Depression, the American Bar Association, along with many regional bar organizations, promoted measures such as stricter prerequisite educational requirements and limits on the number of lawyers admitted to the bar due to a perceived excess of lawyers entering the profession. Burns remarked that "there is always room at the top for good lawyers, and instead of considering a limited bar, the profession should merely be careful about the type of men and women who are allowed to take the bar examinations".

=== American Sugar Refining Co. v. Blake ===
On March 3, 1925, Burns became the first female lawyer to appear before the Connecticut Supreme Court. Alongside Hugh M. Alcorn, the state's attorney of Hartford County, Burns represented the defense in American Sugar Refining Co. v. Blake, a lawsuit brought by the American Sugar Refining Company against Edwin G. Blake et al. for breach of contract. The company was appealing the lower court's verdict in favor of the defense after the judge denied a motion to set aside the verdict on the grounds of error in the proceedings. Ultimately, the Connecticut Supreme Court ruled for the plaintiff, finding error in the lower court's proceedings. A new trial was ordered. Burns did not participate in the arguments, but was on the brief and present in the courtroom.

== Political career ==
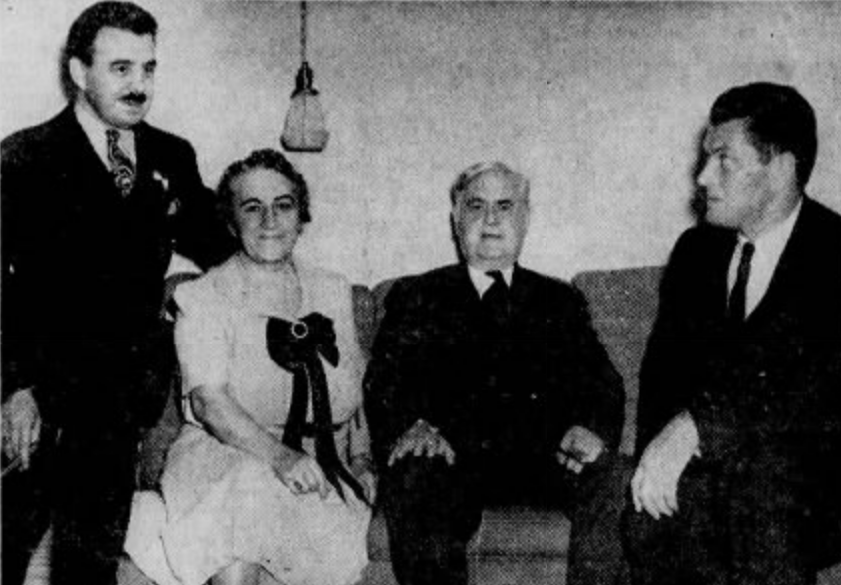
C. John Satti, Burns, Augustine Lonergan, and Gene Tunney at the 1938 Connecticut Democratic State Convention

A Democrat, Burns was first elected to the Connecticut House of Representatives in 1930, and she served three terms as one of two representatives from the city of Hartford. She served her first two terms alongside John A. Markham, and her third alongside Thomas F. Leavy. Burns did not run for reelection in 1936 and was succeeded by Leavy and Ernest T. Racicot in 1937. During her tenure, she was a member of the State Prison Committee and the School Fund Committee, and she served as clerk of the Claims Committee.

== Death ==
Burns died on March 6, 1952, at Saint Francis Hospital & Medical Center in Hartford.
