= Allan K. Smith =

American lawyer

United States Attorney for the District of Connecticut
- In office 1923–1925
- President: Calvin Coolidge
- Preceded by: Edward L. Smith
- Succeeded by: John Buckley

Personal details
- Born: Allan Kellogg Smith; August 17, 1888 Hartford, Connecticut
- Died: September 4, 1985 (aged 97) Hartford, Connecticut
- Education: Trinity College(1911); Harvard Law School (L.L.B.)

Allan Kellogg Smith (August 17, 1888 – April 9, 1985) was an American attorney and educator who served as the United States Attorney for the District of Connecticut under Calvin Coolidge.

== Biography ==
Allan K. Smith was born in Hartford and would go on to live there his entire life. He was educated in Hartford Public High School and then went on to Trinity College. He received his law degree from Harvard Law School. In 1921 he was one of the 3 founders of the Hartford College of Law (later this would become University of Connecticut law school). In addition to his teaching he served as the US attorney for the district of Connecticut under Calvin Coolidge. At his alma mater he endowed the Allan K. Smith Center for Writing and Rhetoric.
