= Smoking in South Korea =

Smoking in South Korea (Korean: 한국에서의 흡연) has decreased overall for both men and women in the past decades. However, a high prevalence of tobacco use is still observed, especially with the rise of novel tobacco products such as e-cigarettes and heat-not-burn tobacco products. There are socioeconomic inequalities in smoking prevalence according to gender, income, education, and occupational class. Advocates call for measures to reduce the smoking rates and address smoking inequalities using a combination of monitoring and tobacco control policies. These measures include significant price hikes, mandatory warning photos on cigarette packs, advertising bans, financial incentives, medical help for quitting, and complete smoking bans in public places.

In 2021, the smoking rate for Koreans over 19 was 19.3%, a record low. That year, 31.3% of men and 6.9% of women were smokers. A 2022 study reported that this was a 50% decrease from 20 years ago.

== History ==
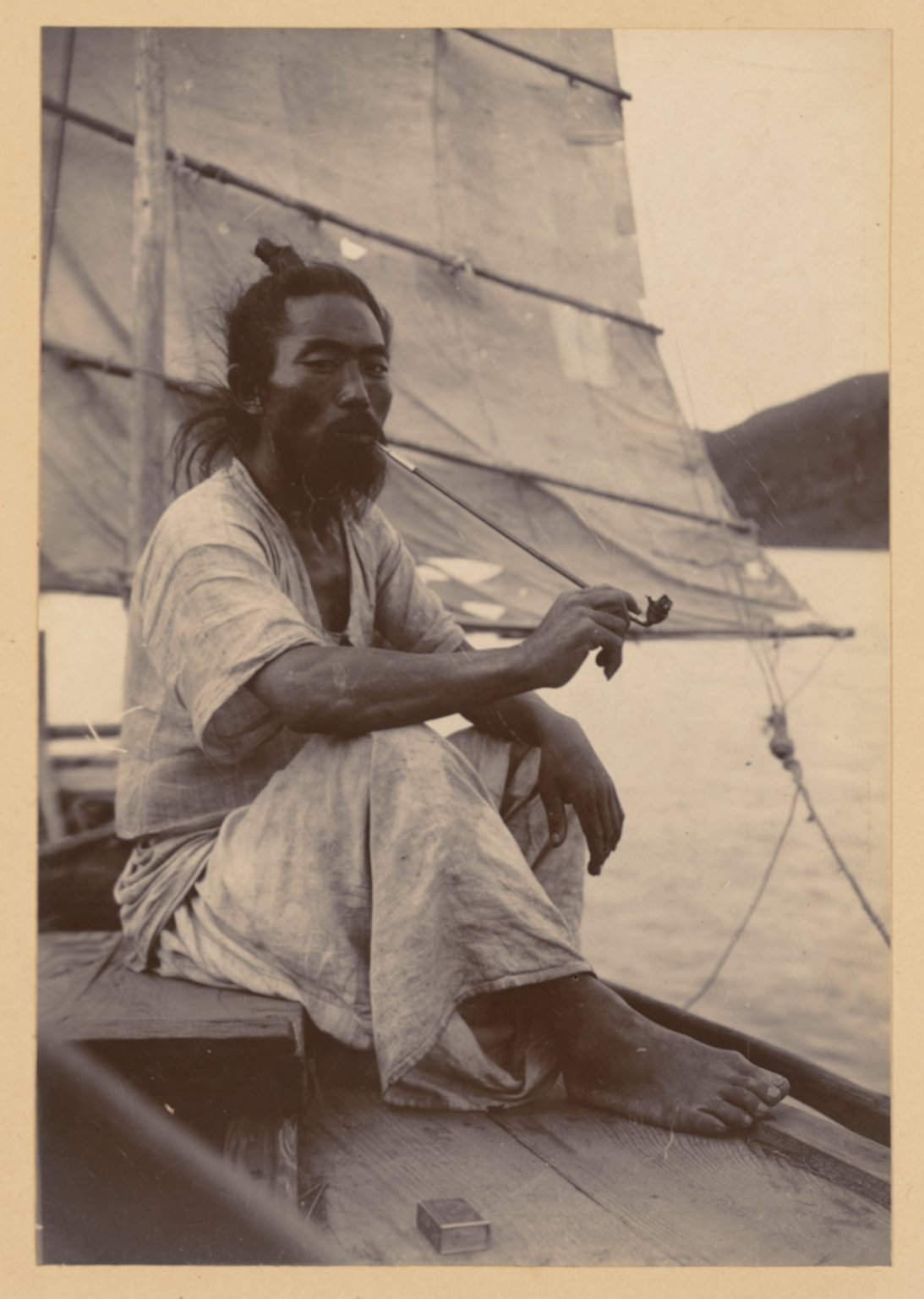
Korean boatman smoking a pipe, c. 1904

Smoking arrived in Korea through the introduction of tobacco in the early 1600s from Japan and quickly became a widespread and popular activity among the people regardless of gender, social class, and age. This was due to the appealing characteristics of tobacco in the context of Korea at that time. Namely, the favorable climate and soil for tobacco cultivation created a profitable economic sector, and smoking was thought to be a health-promoting, social, and cultural activity. Although smoking was common amongst all people, the quality of tobacco used differed across the established classes of the hierarchical system. The Dutch mariner Hendrick Hamel wrote in the 17th century that tobacco use was so prevalent that even children began smoking by age four or five. The practice became so widespread that it became said that even tigers must have smoked in Korea, which gave rise to the phrase "a long time ago, when tigers smoked pipes..." (Korean: 『옛날 옛적에 호랑이 담배 피던 시절에...』) to begin stories about the distant past.

Men and women both smoked until around 1880, when stigmas against women, especially young and middle-aged women, started to arise.

== Prevalence of smoking ==
=== Cigarettes ===
==== Adults ====
According to the 2017 World Health Organization (WHO) report on the global tobacco epidemic, smoking prevalence was estimated to be 49.8% among males and 4.2% among females in 2015, when both daily and non-daily smokers were included. Another survey by the Organization for Economic Cooperation and Development (OECD), which included only daily smokers, indicated a smoking prevalence of 31.1% among males and 3.4% among females in 2015.

The Korea National Health and Nutrition Examination Survey (KNHANES) tracks smoking behavior in Korean adults (aged 19 years or older). KNHANES aims to represent the Korean population through surveying approximately 10,000 individuals aged 1 year and older from 3,840 households. In this survey, adult smokers were defined as those who smoked at least five packs of cigarettes in their lifetime and currently smoke everyday or on somedays. In 2016, the cigarette smoking prevalence was 40.7% among male adults and 6.4% among female adults. According to the Korea National Health and Nutrition Examination Survey (KNHANES), conducted by the Korea Disease Control and Prevention Agency, the prevalence of current cigarette smoking among adults fell to 30.0% for men and 5.0% for women by 2022. In 2023, however, the current smoking figures rose to 32.4% among men and 6.3% among women, reversing the long-term downward trend.

==== Adolescents ====
The Korea Youth Risk Behavior Web-based Survey (KYRBWS) annually tracks smoking behavior in Korean adolescents, defined as individuals between the ages 12 and 18. In this survey, adolescent smokers are defined as those who had smoked on more than one day during the past 30 days. In 2015, adolescent cigarette prevalence was measured to be 7.8%. In 2013, the cigarette smoking prevalence was 14.4% among male adolescents and 4.6% among female adolescents. When the adolescent group was divided, high school students had a higher prevalence rate (20.7% males, 6.3% females) compared with middle school students (7.9% males, 2.8% females).

=== E-cigarettes ===
E-cigarettes were introduced in the South Korean market in 2007. Whereas other countries have seen a dramatic rise in e-cigarette use among adolescents, it has remained at a stable low level in Korea. According to the 2015 KYRBWS, e-cigarette prevalence among adolescents was 4%. Adolescents make up less than 3% of e-cigarette users.

=== Other tobacco products ===
IQOS, a heat-not-burn tobacco product from company Philip Morris International (PMI), was introduced in South Korea in May 2017 in two stores in Seoul. A month later in June, IQOS was sold by other retail outlets including CU (a convenience store chain) and Electromart (an electronics store chain).

== Cultural environment ==
=== General attitudes ===
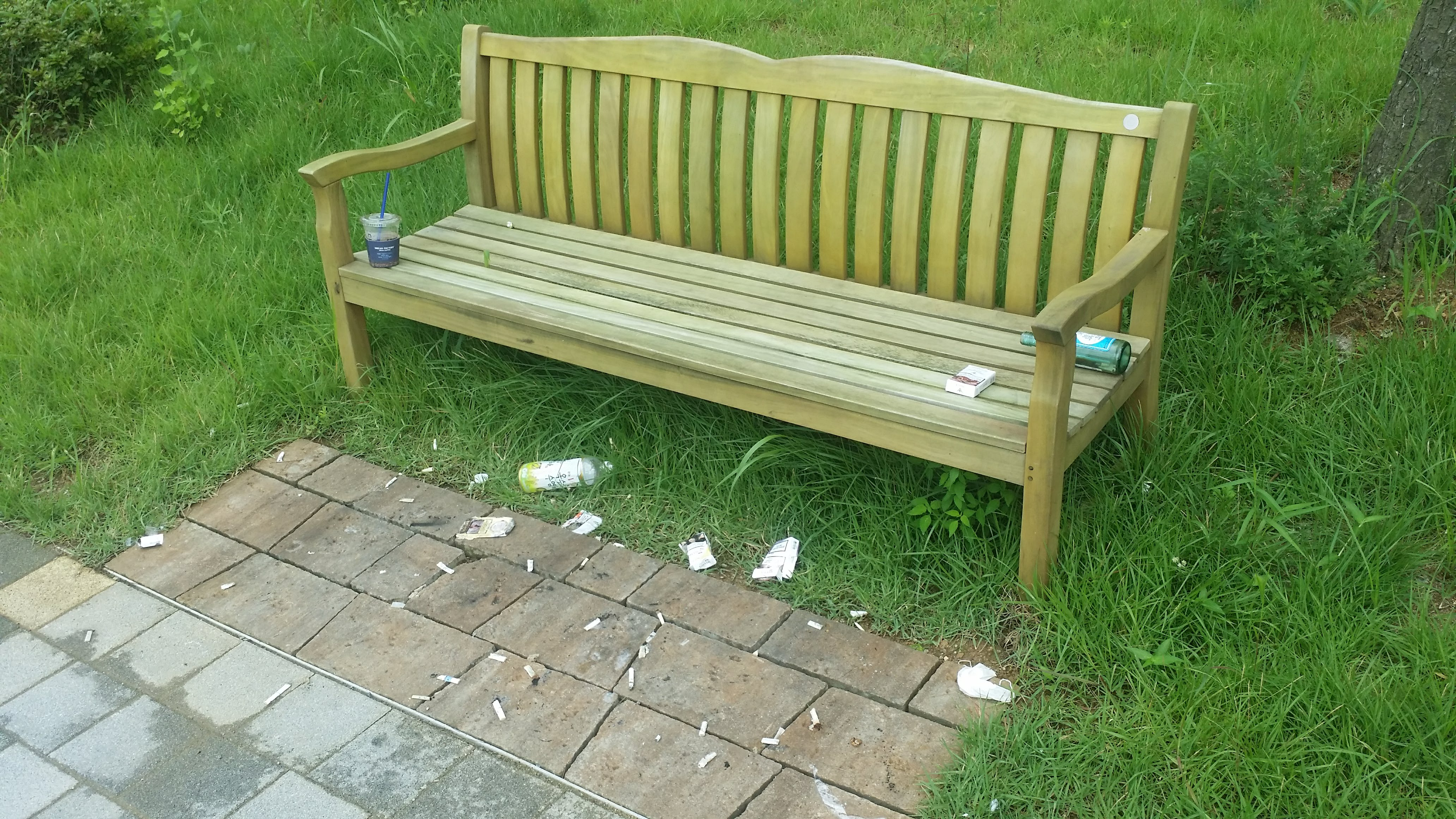
Cigarette trash and assorted trash left by smokers at a bench in Ansan, South Korea, in 2020

Compared with the past, smoking has become substantially less prevalent. Still, South Korea has a high smoking prevalence, but tobacco control measures may be a strategy to depict smoking as an undesirable or socially unacceptable activity in public places. Research has shown that smoke-free policies help to change attitudes towards smoking bans in public places. Specifically, through a process called denormalisation, smoke-free policies may shift attitudes of smokers and non-smokers from smoking acceptance to regarding it as an atypical behavior.

There is a cultural reluctance to seek treatment such as medical or psychological support. 87.8% of Korean male smokers indicated that they would rather try to quit smoking by themselves than seek out smoking cessation tools.

Local smoking etiquette in South Korea is influenced by Confucianism. For instance, smokers generally refrain from or seek permission before lighting up in the presence of social superiors; a social superior could be a boss, professor, parent, grandparent, or teacher.

=== Social differences ===
According to the 2013 KNHANES, the highest prevalence rates among both Korean male and female adults were found to be among those of either lower household income or lower education level. Another study also indicated that the "low" income quartile group showed the highest smoking rates for both males and females. Specifically, the difference in cigarette smoking prevalence between those with the highest and lowest household incomes was 11.8% among males and 5.4% among females. On the other hand, the lowest rates were found to be among those with college and higher education levels. For males, smoking was most prevalent among technicians and mechanics (51.6%), service and sale workers (51.4%), and simple laborers (49.3%). For females, smoking was most prevalent among service and sales workers (10.8%), simple laborers (8.2%), and agriculture, forestry, fishing workers (5.0%). While "rural" regions showed the highest smoking rates among males, "other urban city" showed the highest smoking rates among females.

The highest adolescent smoking rates were found to be among those of either lower household economic status or lower perceived academic records. Furthermore, smoking use was higher among students attending vocational high schools (31.6% males, 14.8% females) compared with those attending general high schools (18.2% males, 4.7% females).

=== Gender differences ===
South Korea has a significant gender difference in its smoking rates. While its male smoking rate is the highest of all countries in the OECD, its female smoking rate is the lowest. However, the female smoking rate is thought to be underestimated due to social desirability response bias in the self-reported surveys, where participants did not want to indicate smoking activity to family members or neighbor during the survey, as well as the negative stigmas associated with smoking among women. Compared with the reported rates, the actual rates, which were measured using urinary cotinine concentration (UCC) methods, were shown to be about two times higher. This is because female smoking is viewed very negatively and socially condemned. The stigmas behind female smoking may even contribute to the reporting differences between married and other (e.g. divorced, unmarried, widowed, etc.) women who may not feel as restricted by social pressures to hide their smoking statuses. Unmarried women have a higher smoking rate. It is important for smoke-free policies to specifically address hidden female smoking activity in order to prevent the possibly increasing prevalence rates among women.

There are also adolescent gender differences in smoking initiation factors. Whereas stress was strongly correlated with smoking initiation for male adolescents, family income was a strong factor for female adolescents. For both male and female adolescents, attachment to friends, smoking friends, stigma, and self-control were common factors for smoking initiation.

=== Military service ===
Reports suggest that persistently high rates of smoking in the military contribute to the high incidence of male smoking and negate the efficacy of anti-smoking measures. This is because as many men start smoking during their mandatory 2-year military service. Smoking is largely framed as a social activity, and cigarettes are freely distributed.

== Tobacco control ==
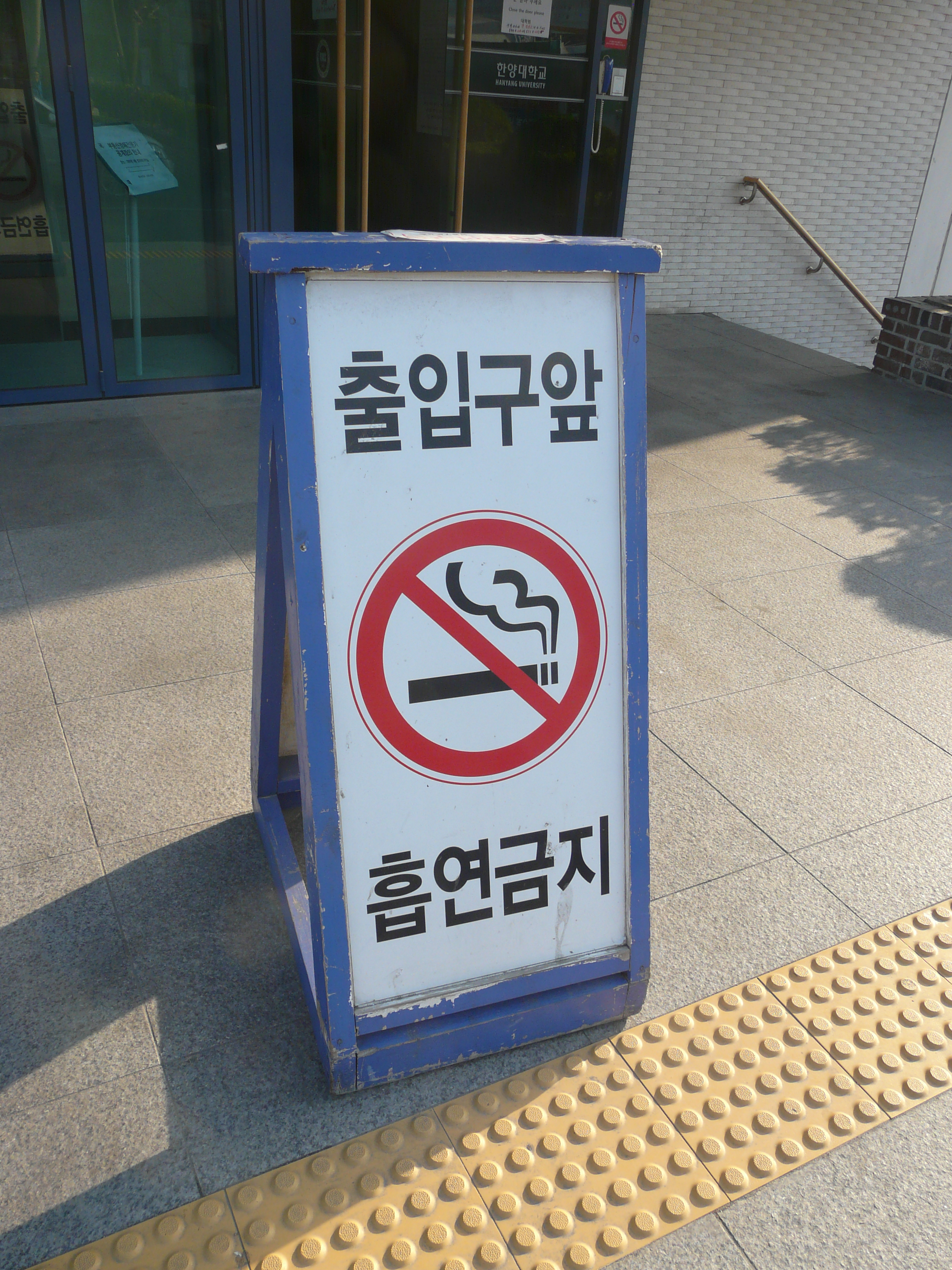
No smoking sign at Hanyang University

The South Korean government has enacted regulations like increasing the price or taxation of tobacco products, smoking bans, and limitations on tobacco advertisements in stores. For example, in 2016, graphical health warnings on all cigarette packages became mandatory.

Tobacco control measures have shown to be effective in decreasing smoking prevalence rates. For example, in 1980, the smoking rates of men and women were 79.3% and 12.6%, respectively. Various laws, policies, and campaigns in the following decades were able to decrease smoking rates significantly (45.0% for men and 5.3% for women). Although South Korea's tobacco control policies have improved in the past years, they can still be expanded on. For example, the cigarette costs can still be increased further, tobacco advertisements can be regulated more, and workplace smoking bans can include smaller companies. Challenges to addressing the high prevalence of smoking in South Korea include the low cost of cigarettes, social factors, inadequate anti-smoking measures, and the rise of new tobacco products.

The sociocultural and economical context of South Korea should be considered when thinking about the trends in smoking prevalence and behavior. Significant economic growth and market liberalisation have allowed transnational tobacco companies to advertise and sell their products to South Korea's market, often targeting populations like women and young adults.

Tobacco control policies need to be comprehensive in order to optimise efficacy and sustainability. A study inquired smokers in Korea about the price increase that would be needed in order for them to attempt quitting. Overall, the median price to quit was $5.31, which is more than 2.3 times the typical current price of $2.27. Those who responded with a higher price to quit tended to also have less worries about the negative health effects of smoking and smoked more cigarettes per day. Furthermore, the survey found that the price to quit and prevalence of smoking were lower among those exposed to non-tax tobacco control policies compared with those who were not. Therefore, these results suggest that tax tobacco control policies need to be accompanied by non-tax tobacco control policies.

=== Historical timeline ===
Year	Event	Significance
1976	Tobacco Monopoly Act	Added cigarette warning labels that stated that cigarette use should be limited for health reasons
1988	Tobacco Business Act	Added stronger cigarette warning labels Yet, overall purpose was to ensure the development of the tobacco industry through advising the production and distribution of tobacco
	Korean tobacco industry opened to global tobacco market	
1995	National Health Promotion Act	Overall purpose was to provide citizens with accurate knowledge about health so that they can live healthy lives Restricted indoor smoking and the advertisement, promotion, and sponsorship of smoking Banned cigarette sales to minors Distributed information on adverse health effects of smoking through campaign
2003	Signing of the World Health Organization Framework Convention on Tobacco Control (WHO FCTC)	
2004	Large cigarette pack tax increase	
2005	Ratification of the WHO FCTC	Included more policies in its 1995 National Health Promotion Act, including more smoke-free areas, cigarette package warnings, restrictions on advertisements
	Establishment of Nationwide Smoking Cessation Program in 253 health centers	Providing nicotine replacement therapy and counseling services at no cost
2006	Revision of the 1995 National Health Promotion Act	Greater emphasis on addressing the socioeconomic inequalities in smoking prevalence
	Introduction of the National Quitline Service	Offering services 13 hours/day on weekdays, 9 hours/day on weekends, and free counseling sessions for registered users for one year 3,368 (19%) of the 17,752 smokers who participated in at least one telephone counseling session did not smoke for 6 months after their designated quit date.
2010-2011	Local governments allowed to restrict outdoor smoking Some public places completely ban outdoor smoking	
2015	National Health Insurance Service includes tobacco cessation consultation and cessation drug fees in its services nationwide	

=== Smoke-free policies ===
Between 2005 and 2010, the support for smoking bans increased. The number of smokers who supported total smoking bans in the indoor areas of workplaces doubled from 17.7% in 2005 to 34.4% in 2010. Furthermore, support for total smoke-free restaurants or bars doubled. Not only in public places but the percentage of smokers who implemented smoking bans in their private homes also significantly increased. Despite this increase, still 50% of Korean smokers reported smoking in their homes.

Exposure to secondhand smoke (SHS) is also an issue that calls for smoke-free policies. A study found that 17.8% of Korean men and women are exposed to SHS in indoor workplace areas while 21.1% are exposed in public indoor areas. The dangers associated with secondhand smoke are well known among Korean smokers. The more they were aware of the harms of SHS, the more they were likely to support a total smoking ban in workplaces.

South Korea enforced strict smoking bans in public places since July 2013, with fines of ₩100,000 won on any spotted smoker and up to ₩5 million won on shop owners not following the law. It is illegal to smoke in all bars and restaurants, cafes, internet cafes, government buildings, kindergartens, schools, universities, hospitals, youth facilities, libraries, children's playgrounds, private academies, subway or train stations and their platforms and underground pathways, large buildings, theaters, department stores or shopping malls, large hotels and highway rest areas. The strict bans came into force gradually beginning with a ban on places larger than 150 square metres in 2012, extended to 100 square metres in 2014, with a full-fledged complete nationwide ban on 1 January 2015.

Since 1 January 2015, South Korea has completely banned smoking on all bars, restaurants and cafes regardless of size, including any smoking rooms. Any spotted smoker must pay fines of 100,000 won and up to 5 million won on shop owners not obeying the law. Anyone can report a smoker via calling or sending a text message to a government hotline (in the case of Seoul, the number is 120) with their location address and authorities will raid the reported place, of which a picture of the offending smoker will be taken and fined 100,000 won. Disguised authorities also secretly check random places at random times for offending smokers. Furthermore, tobacco prices have nearly doubled to an average of ₩4,500 KRW, and it is illegal to advertise misleading claims such as "light", "mild", "low tar" or "pure" on cigarette packs.

From December 2016, warning photos such as rotten teeth and black lungs were made mandatory on all cigarette packs.

Eight out of ten teenagers were found to think they should not smoke by looking at cigarette pack warning pictures. According to the Centre for Disease Control, 83.1% of teenagers who know cigarette warning pictures responded that they thought smoking cigarettes should not be allowed to smoke. The health authorities have announced that they will replace the cigarette warning label in December and will include a picture symbolising 'carcinogenicity' in cigarette-type electronic cigarette packs.

Discussion is under way at the Parliament to pass a law that will raise the prices every year pegged to inflation. The government has passed a law in 2015 to completely ban any form of advertising of cigarettes in convenience stores and make it illegal for tobacco companies to sponsor cultural or sport events.

==== Nationwide ====
Smoking is illegal and strictly prohibited in the following premises:

- Office, multi-use or factory buildings larger than 1,000 square meters in floor area (of which offices, conference rooms, auditorium and lobby must be smoke-free).
- Institutions larger than 1,000 square meters in floor area (of which classrooms, waiting rooms and lounges must be smoke-free).
- Shopping malls, department stores and underground malls (of which any shop selling goods must be smoke-free).
- Hotels and resorts (of which the lobby must be smoke-free).
- Universities (of which lecture rooms, lounges, auditoria, cafeteria and conference hall must be smoke-free).
- Indoor sports facilities such as basketball and volleyball courts which can seat more than 1,000 people (of which the seats and pathways must be smoke-free).
- Social welfare facilities (of which the living and working rooms, lounge, cafeteria and conference hall must be smoke-free).
- Airports, bus terminals and train stations (of which waiting rooms, domestic flights, cabins, inside trains, subway car and its platform and underground stations and underground pathways must be smoke-free).
- Any vehicle that can seat more than 16 people.
- Public baths (of which changing rooms and bathing rooms must be smoke-free).
- Game arcades, comic book renting shops and internet cafes.
- Bars, restaurants, cafes, fast food restaurants and bakeries, regardless of size.
- Baseball or football/soccer stadiums which can seat more than 1,000 people (of which the seats and pathways must be smoke-free).
- Kindergartens, primary and secondary schools.
- Hospitals and health centers.
- Nurseries.
- Taxis.

==== Seoul ====
In addition to the nationwide ban laws, Seoul designates the following areas must be smoke-free and any spotted smoker must pay a fine of 100,000 won:

- All subway station exits (10m around the exits) from April 2016.
- All parks owned by Seoul city (including sidewalks around rivers or streams).
- All bus stops.
- Apartments designated as smoke-free.
- All gas stations.
- Road between Gwanghwamun and Seoul Station.
- Cheonggye plaza at the beginning of Cheongyecheon and Gwanghwamun plaza.
- Insa-dong street.
- Both sides of the road between Gangnam station and Sinnonhyeon station. Extended to the road between Gangnam Station and Woosung Apartments in 2015.
- The area surrounding Jamsil station which includes Lotte World, Lotte World Tower, Songpa-gu Office, Galleria Palace apartments and entrance to Seokchon Lake.
- Namdaemun street around Myeong-dong.
- Both sides of the road between Yeouido station and Yeouinaru station.
- Yeongdeungpo station plaza and both sides of the National Assembly road (2.1 km).
- Both sides of the road around the Daechi-dong academy town.
- Festivals street in Mok-dong around Happy department store.
- Streets around the entrance of Hankuk University of Foreign Studies and Kyung Hee University.
- Seongbuk and Jeongneung streams, Hanaro street, Amazon street near Mia Elementary School.

==== Other regions ====
In addition to the nationwide ban laws, several Provinces designate the following areas must be smoke-free:

- Apartment corridors, stairs, elevators and car parks in Gyeonggi Province if at least 60% of residents have agreed to keep them smoke-free.
- Wolmi-do culture street in Incheon.
- All bus stops, areas around schools, Lake Park and Hwarang pleasure ground in Ansan.
- All bus stops, areas around schools and city parks in Seongnam.
- The entire Busan Citizens' Park.
- Dongseong street in Daegu.
- Noeun Station and Yuseong Culture Park in Daejeon's Yuseong District.
- Sanbon Rodeo Street in Gunpo.

=== Public campaigns ===
Although public campaigns have been used in South Korea, further evaluation is needed to assess their effectiveness. The public campaigns included mass media campaigns on television and radio, advertisements on public transportation, online education, and self-help leaflets in health centers. The most effective form of campaign is one that reaches a large population and conveys negative health messages highlighting the harms of tobacco use.

=== Marketing ===
In South Korea, regulations on tobacco advertising differ depending on the form of communication. For instance, while tobacco advertisements on television and radio are banned, they are allowed in magazines and in retail stores. Tobacco sponsorship is restricted only for events strictly for women and children.

=== Other interventions ===
Quitlines have been reported to be effective as a smoking cessation tool with the widespread use of mobile technology in South Korea. The "quit bus" provides smoking cessation services for socially marginalised smokers such as women.

=== Incentives for smoking cessation ===
People who have successfully quit smoking will receive 50,000 to 150,000 KRW as a financial incentive from the government. A 12-week medical help program for quitting is provided at a heavily subsidized cost of 5,000KRW upon the first treatment, reduced to 3,000KRW thereafter. Smoking cessation aids such as bupropion, varenicline and nicotine patches are handed out for free at any participating medical center nationwide. Anyone in need of consulting smoking cessation can dial a hotline and consult a doctor or specialist.

Residents of Seoul's Seocho District will receive a 5 million KRW cash prize if they have successfully quit smoking.

== Effects of smoking ==
=== Health effects ===
Tobacco smoking is considered to be the leading cause of preventable death and disability worldwide. Although there is rising awareness of the health effects of tobacco, the prevalent smoking environment in South Korea continues to place a significant burden of avoidable deaths. Smoking-attributable mortality was 58,155 deaths in 2012 with 49,704 (34.7%) being adult males and 8,451 (7.2%) being adult females. 41.1% and 5.1% of all male and female cancer, respectively, and 33.4% and 5.4% of all male and female cardiovascular diseases were attributed to smoking. Furthermore, the prevalence of the major smoking-related diseases (chronic obstructive pulmonary disease (COPD), hypertension, cardiovascular disease) was found to be higher in former and current smokers compared to non-smoker. COPD had a significant association with current and former smoking in both male and female smokers after controlling for other variables.

A study found that exposure to parental smoking, including passive smoking, substantially increased the prevalence of respiratory and allergic symptoms in children. Passive smoking includes both secondhand smoke and third-hand smoke, which is a type of tobacco smoke that remains in the environment or is absorbed by objects like fabrics or carpets and can be inhaled. As parental smoking gradually decreased during the study, children't symptoms also decreased. Although no direct relationship could be established, the study notes that the children's decreased exposure to passive smoking may have contributed to the decline in symptoms.

=== Economic effects ===
Smoking has a significant economic impact in South Korea. One study aimed to find the estimated annual economic impact of smoking using two approaches: the disease specific approach and all causes approach. The disease specific approach examined the direct and indirect costs of treating four major disease groups (cardiovascular, respiratory, gastrointestinal diseases, and cancer) caused by smoking. They did this by estimating the relative risks of smoking, accounted for by physician visits, hospital admission, and death with other variables (e.g. age, body mass index, alcohol consumption) adjusted for. This approach showed the total economic costs attributed to smoking in 1998 to be $2269.42 million - $2956.75 million, translated to 0.59-0.78% of the average gross domestic product (GDP) from 1997 to 1999. The all causes approach examined the differences in direct and indirect costs between smokers and non-smokers for all conditions, regardless of disease type. This approach estimated the total economic costs attributed to smoking in 1998 to be $3,154.75 million - $4,580.25 million, translated to 0.82-1.19% of the GDP.

== See also ==
- Smoking in North Korea
- Health effects of tobacco
- Health in South Korea
- Prevalence of tobacco consumption
- Women and smoking
