= Marian Roberts =

American politician (died 1980)

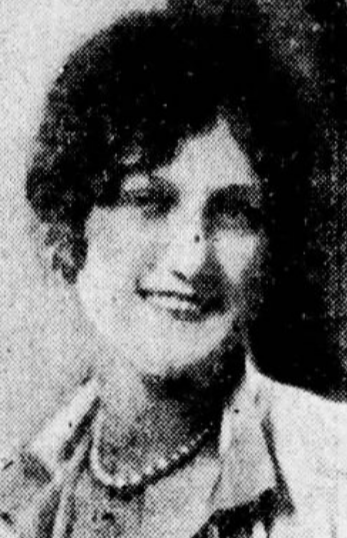

Member of the Connecticut House of Representatives from Hartford
- In office 1929–1931 Serving with John A. Markham
- Preceded by: Mary Wiedman; Albert Newfield
- Succeeded by: J. Agnes Burns; John A. Markham

Personal details
- Born: Marian Greene; 1901 or 1902 Hartford, Connecticut, U.S.
- Died: November 4, 1980 (aged 78) West Hartford, Connecticut, U.S.
- Party: Democratic
- Spouse: Jay B. Roberts
- Children: 2

Marian Greene Roberts (1901 or 1902 – November 4, 1980) was an American politician who served in the Connecticut House of Representatives from 1929 to 1931, representing the city of Hartford as a Democrat.

== Personal life ==
Roberts was born in Hartford, Connecticut, and graduated from Hartford Public High School. She was married to Jay B. Roberts and had two children.

== Political career ==
A Democrat, Roberts was elected to the Connecticut House of Representatives in 1928, and she served one term representing the city of Hartford alongside John A. Markham. Beginning her term at age 26, Roberts was the youngest woman legislator in the Connecticut General Assembly during her tenure. Roberts did not run for reelection in 1930 and was succeeded by Markham and J. Agnes Burns.

== Death ==
Roberts died on November 4, 1980, in West Hartford, Connecticut. She was 78.
