= John Buckley (attorney) =

American attorney and politician (1885–1959)

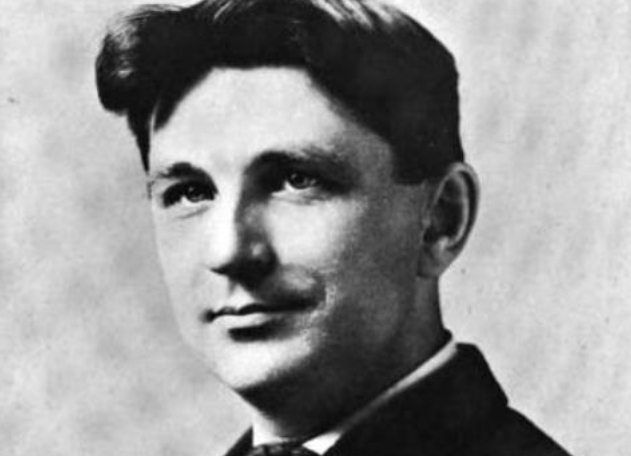

Member of the Connecticut House of Representatives from Union
- In office 1909–1910
- In office 1921–1922

United States Attorney for the District of Connecticut
- In office 1925–1933
- President: Calvin Coolidge; Herbert Hoover
- Preceded by: Allan K. Smith
- Succeeded by: Frank Bergin

Personal details
- Born: May 12, 1885 Stafford, Connecticut
- Died: December 11, 1959 (aged 74) Union, Connecticut
- Party: Republican
- Spouse: Grace R Gaylord Buckley
- Education: University of Maine (LLB); University of Maine (LLM)
- Profession: Lawyer, politician

Military service
- Allegiance: United States
- Branch/service: United States Army
- Years of service: 1917–1920
- Rank: Major

John Buckley (May 12, 1885 – December 11, 1959) was an American attorney who served as the United States Attorney for the District of Connecticut under two presidents. He also served in the Connecticut House of Representatives and United States Army.

== Biography ==
John Buckley was born in Stafford, Connecticut on May 12, 1885. He lived in Stafford until he was seven years old, when his family moved to the neighboring town of Union. He was educated at Union's public schools and at Hitchcock Academy in Brimfield, Massachusetts. He received his LLB in 1907 and his LLM in 1908 from the University of Maine College of Law. He was admitted to the Connecticut Bar in June 1907 and entered private practice.

In 1909, Buckley became the youngest sitting member of the Connecticut House of Representatives, chairing the House Committee on Labor. A member of the Republican Party, he served two terms in the House, both representing Union. He became assistant clerk of the House in 1911 and clerk of the Senate in 1917. From 1917 to 1921 he served as executive secretary to Governor Marcus H. Holcomb. During World War I, Buckley was commissioned a US Army major and charged with administering the Selective Service System in Connecticut. He served as US District Attorney for the District of Connecticut from 1924 to 1933.

Buckley served as a trustee of the University of Connecticut from 1926 to 1940. The Buckley dormitory building on UConn's campus in Storrs was named in his honor.

Buckley married Grace Robinson Gaylor of Winsted in December 1930. He died after a long illness at his home in West Hartford on December 11, 1959.
