= Edward L. Smith =

American attorney and judge

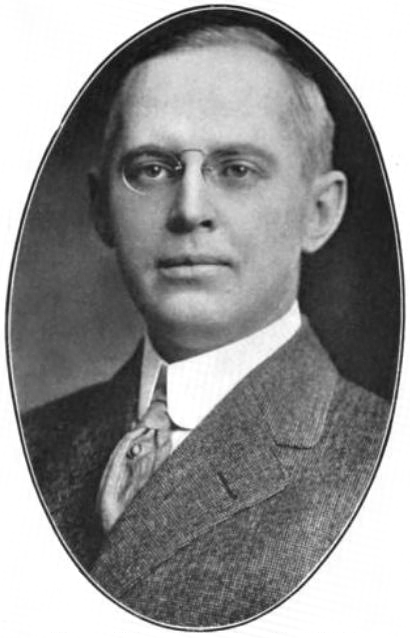

35th Mayor of Hartford, Connecticut
- In office April 5, 1910 – April 2, 1912
- Preceded by: Edward W. Hooker
- Succeeded by: Louis R. Cheney

Connecticut Judge of Common Pleas for Hartford County
- In office 1915–1919

United States Attorney for the District of Connecticut
- In office 1919–1923
- President: Woodrow Wilson; Warren G. Harding
- Preceded by: John Francis Crosby
- Succeeded by: Allan K. Smith

Personal details
- Born: Edward Lawrence Smith; January 22, 1875 Hartford, Connecticut
- Died: February 9, 1923 (aged 48) Hartford, Connecticut
- Party: Democratic Party
- Education: Yale; Yale Law School

Edward Lawrence Smith (Note: Spelled "Laurence" in some sources.) (January 22, 1875 – February 9, 1923) was an American attorney and judge who served as the United States Attorney for the District of Connecticut under two presidents. In addition he was the 35th Mayor of Hartford, Connecticut.

== Biography ==
Born to Andrew Jackson and Julia Agnes (Burke) Smith on January 22, 1875, in Hartford, Connecticut, Edward L. Smith was one of 5 children. He would go on to become a lawyer, politician, and judge in Connecticut. He served a four-year term as United States Attorney after resigning from the bench. His first political ventures where running for the Connecticut House of Representatives, however he never was elected to that body. He served as the mayor of Hartford for one term as a Democrat in a heavily Republican town.

He died from pneumonia at his home in Hartford on February 9, 1923.
