= Mary Wiedman =

American politician (1884–1946)

Member of the Connecticut House of Representatives from Hartford
- In office 1927–1929 Serving with Albert Newfield
- Preceded by: Louis A. Samuels; Mary Hooker
- Succeeded by: John A. Markham; Marian Roberts

Personal details
- Born: Mary Seymour; June 14, 1884 Simsbury, Connecticut, U.S.
- Died: October 9, 1946 (aged 62) Hartford, Connecticut, U.S.
- Party: Republican
- Spouse: Otto G. Wiedman

Mary Wiedman (June 14, 1884 – October 9, 1946) was an American politician who served in the Connecticut House of Representatives from 1927 to 1929, representing the city of Hartford as a Republican.

== Personal life ==
Mary Seymour was born on June 14, 1884, in Simsbury, Connecticut, to Thomas and Mary Rutherford Seymour. She was a registered nurse and worked for the United States Public Health Service during World War I. She was married to Otto G. Wiedman.

== Career ==
A Republican, Wiedman was elected to the Connecticut House of Representatives in 1926, and she served one term representing the city of Hartford alongside fellow Republican Albert Newfield. She served on the Humane Institutions Committee. Wiedman did not run for reelection in 1928, and she and Newfield were succeeded by Democrats John A. Markham and Marian Roberts.

== Death ==
Wiedman died on October 9, 1946, at Hartford Hospital in Hartford, Connecticut. She was 62. Wiedman was buried in Cedar Hill Cemetery.
