= Smoking in North Korea =

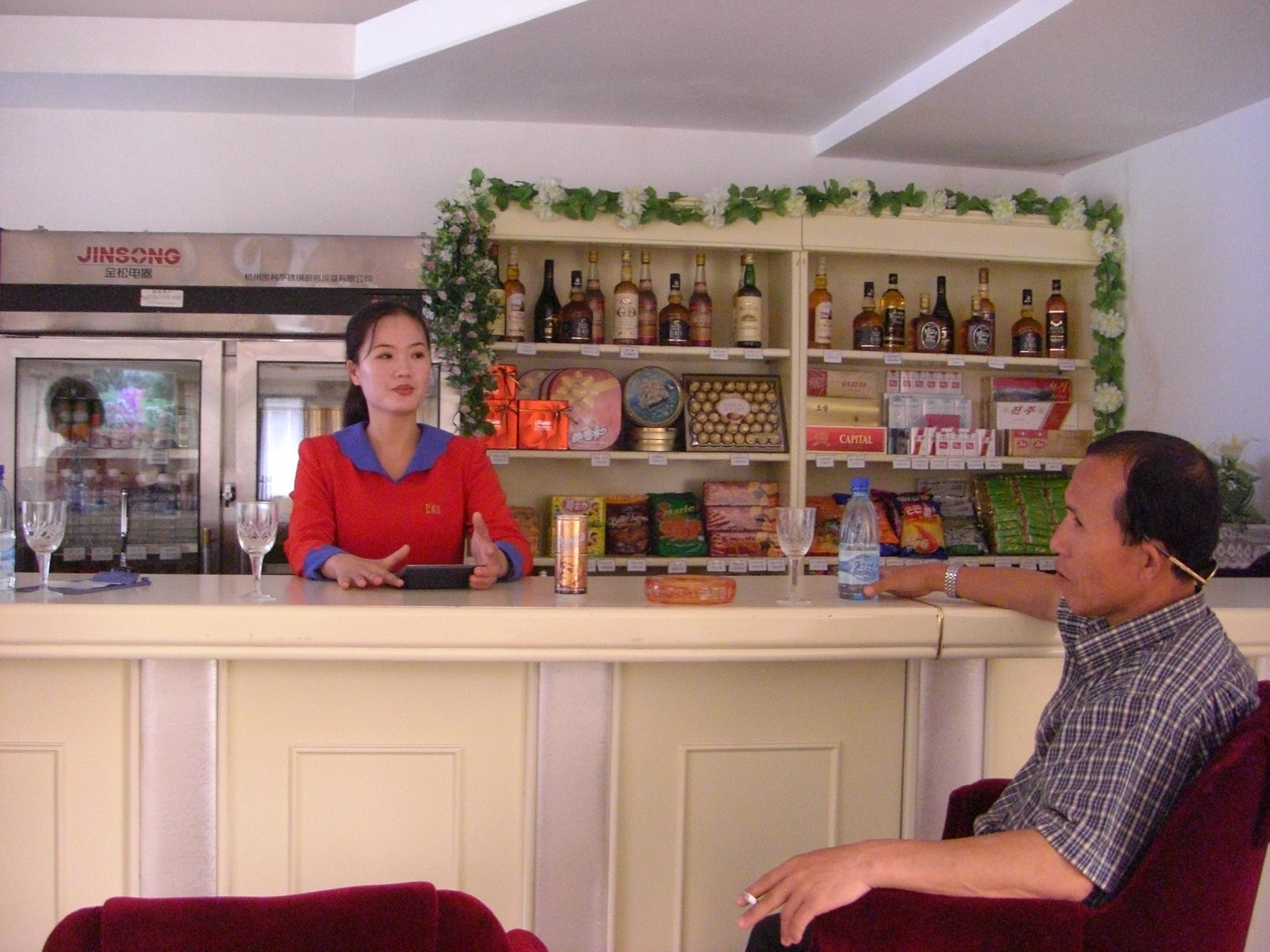
A man smokes at a shop selling cigarettes.

Tobacco smoking is popular in North Korea and culturally acceptable among men, but not for women. As of 2019, some 43.6% of men are reported to smoke daily, whilst in contrast only 4.5% of women smoke daily, with most of these being older women from rural areas. Smoking is a leading cause of death in North Korea, and as of 2021 mortality figures indicate that 14.2% of North Koreans die due to smoking-related causes, which is the 6th highest rate after China, Greenland, Kiribati, Denmark and Micronesia. There are tobacco control programs in North Korea, and although smoking was not prohibited in all public spaces, the smoking rates have declined since their peak in the 2000s.

However, according to the KCNA, the state news agency of North Korea, the Supreme People's Assembly has introduced smoking bans in some public places to provide citizens with "hygienic living environments".

All three leaders of North Korea — Kim Il Sung, Kim Jong Il, and Kim Jong Un — have been smokers and the country has struggled to balance their public image with its anti-smoking efforts. In general, North Koreans tend to prefer strong tobacco and different classes of quality range from homegrown to sought-after foreign brands that are considered status symbols. As a percentage of the available arable land compared to consumption, the tobacco crop is over-represented in North Korean agriculture.

== Consumption ==
Over 5,355,658 adults and 4% of the youth in North Korea are believed to consume tobacco daily. It is estimated by the World Lung Foundation and American Cancer Society's The Tobacco Atlas (2019 data) that 43.6% of men, 4.5% of women, nearly 2.4% of boys and 5.1% of girls (aged <15) are daily smokers, with the average smoker (data is likely skewed towards males due to the higher prevalence of smoking in this group) smoking an average of 609 cigarettes per person per year. World Health Organization (WHO) data is roughly comparable, with 44% of men classified as smokers (only 33% are classed as "daily smokers"), whilst North Korean anti-smoking authorities put the figure even higher, saying that some 54% of men are smokers.

Overall, the average smoker consumes 12.4 cigarettes per day, with this figure rising slightly to 15 per day when just male smokers are considered. The average smoker starts smoking at the age of 23 and the percentage of the population that smokes increases with age until the 55–64 age group, after which it declines. On average, people who live in urban areas tend to smoke more cigarettes per day than rural farmers.

Data indicate that the prevalence of smoking in North Korea is on par with South Korea, although South Korean men pick up the habit earlier and smoke more cigarettes per day. The high rate of smoking in South Korea is possibly due to it being a free society, where marketing is prevalent and consumption is uncontrolled.

However, much of the current information regarding the smoking habits of North Koreans is obtained by studying North Korean defectors who now live in South Korea and may not be totally representative of the true picture. One study of defectors found that smoking is even more common than anticipated, but nicotine dependence was not as severe as predicted. Defectors are reported as often being very interested in quitting smoking.

== History ==
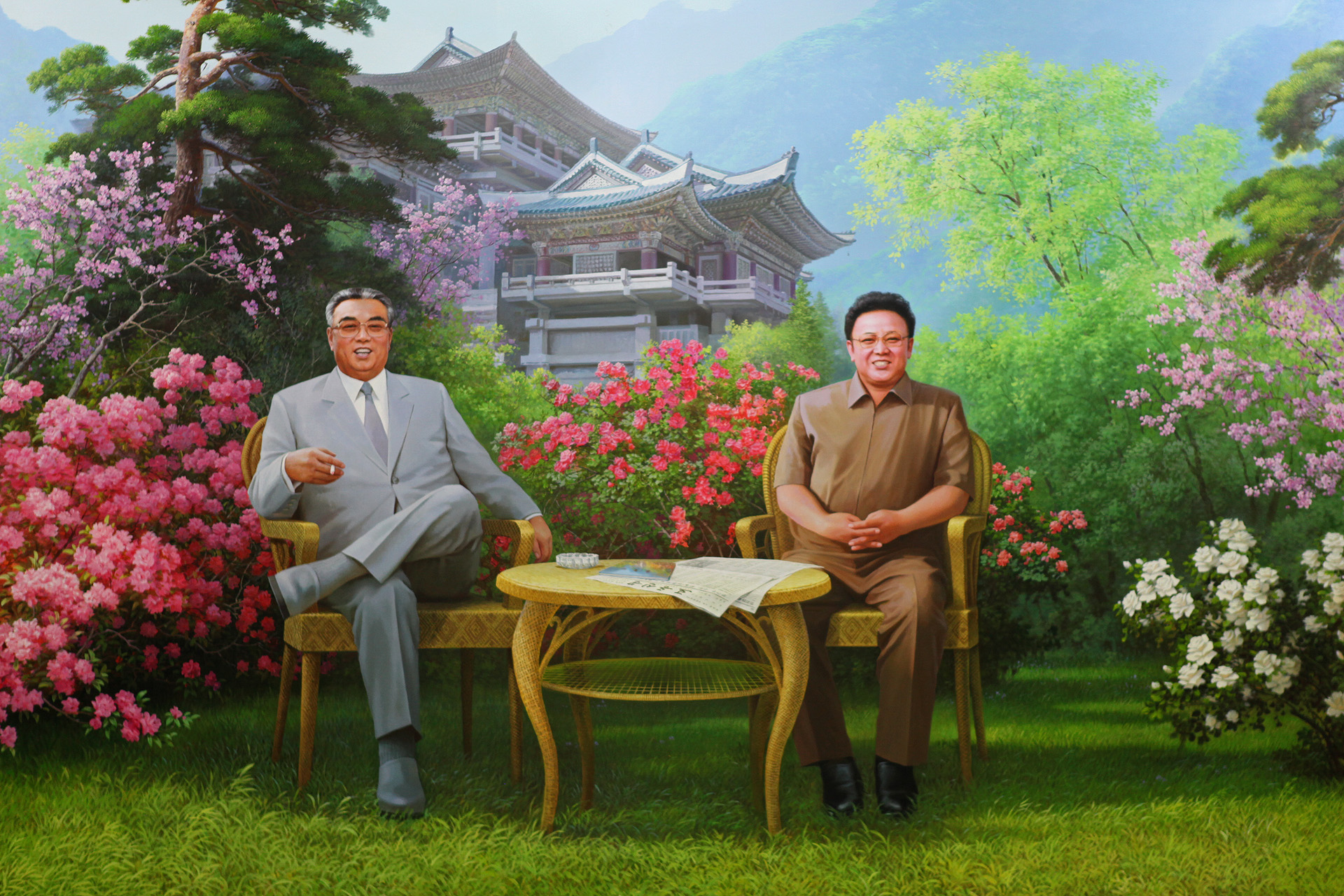
North Korea's first Supreme Leader Kim Il Sung depicted smoking. All three leaders have been smokers.

Tobacco first arrived in Korea in the early-1600s from Japan and until around 1880, both men and women smoked. Today, North Koreans consider smoking to be a normal activity for men, but female smoking has become a social taboo.

All of North Korea's three leaders—Kim Jong Un, his father Kim Jong Il and grandfather Kim Il Sung; have been smokers. Kim Jong Il has called smokers one of the "three main fools of the 21st century", along with people who do not understand music or computers. The current leader Kim Jong Un is often seen smoking in public, including in university classrooms, subway carriages, and in the presence of his pregnant wife Ri Sol-ju, facts that "might make the life of the North Korean health educators more complicated." While discussing any negative aspects of the leaders has normally been rare, some North Koreans have recently raised the issue of the apparent contradiction between anti-smoking measures and Kim's public image with foreigners.

== Culture ==
=== Women and smoking ===
Female smoking is a taboo in North Korea and is considered even more disgraceful than heavy drinking. Women are said to "react with shock if you joke that maybe they secretly smoke in bathrooms". Smoking by older women, above the age of 45 to 50, is more tolerated, particularly in rural areas. In comparison, for men smoking is considered such an important social activity that men who do not smoke can become socially isolated at workplaces.

=== Smokers' preferences ===
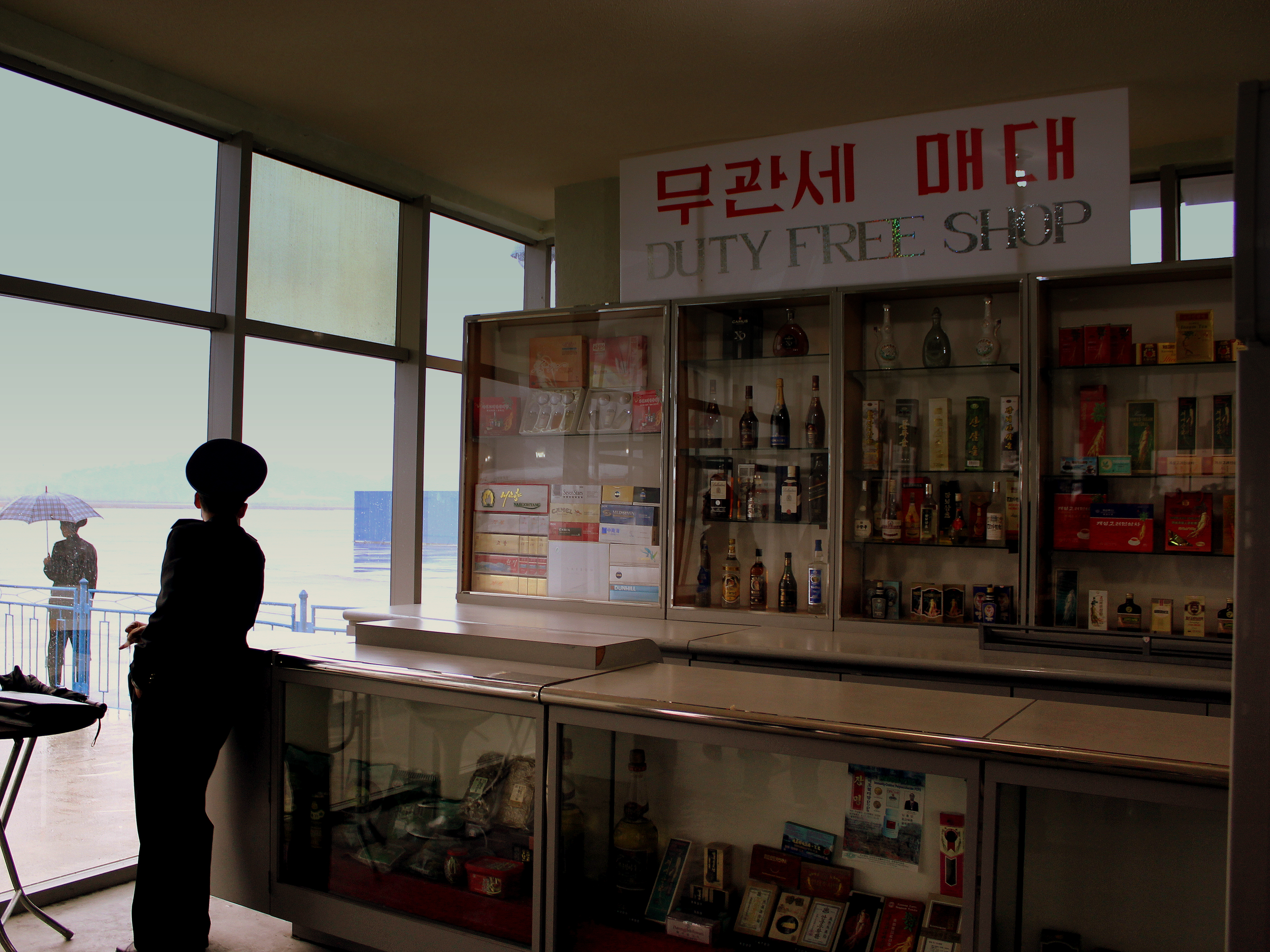
Cigarettes being sold at a duty-free shop at Pyongyang Sunan International Airport

Even though most consumer items are in short supply in North Korea, there is a considerable variety of cigarettes available. In general, strong tobacco is preferred, and filters are rare. Western brands, particularly American, but also Chinese, Russian and Japanese are popular with the elite and preferred over domestic cigarettes. Foreign cigarettes and the domestic 7.27 brand, whose name stands for 27 July, the date of the Korean Armistice Agreement; are veritable status symbols. Menthol cigarettes are virtually non-existent, but there is competition among tobacco companies to introduce other attractive products, such as fruit-flavored balls inside the filter to give the cigarette a more distinct flavour.

Those who have hard currency can easily buy imported cigarettes from hard currency shops, although these will also stock the best domestic brands (such as Pak Ma (백마)) to convince tourists of the quality of North Korean tobacco. Cigarettes are popular gifts, and tourists are recommended to give Western brands of cigarettes to tour guides. Within the country, cigarettes are used as a form of currency in bribery.

Those who roll their own tobacco prefer to use sheets of Rodong Sinmun—the organ of the Central Committee of the ruling Workers' Party of Korea—as rolling paper. One piece of the paper can be used to roll some 40–50 cigarettes. According to one defector, when a North Korean "starts to smoke the Rodong Sinmun tobacco, he cannot smoke other kinds of tobacco. I used to smoke the Rodong Sinmun tobacco, and after defection, couldn't smoke with Chinese paper tobacco due to the poor taste." Because the Rodong Sinmun is in limited circulation, most North Koreans roll their cigarettes with some other paper.

== Health effects ==
The health impacts of smoking are well documented and in North Korea the high prevalence of smoking has a significant impact on the health of the population. As of 2021 mortality figures indicate that 14.2% of North Koreans die due to smoking-related causes, which is the 6th highest rate after China, Greenland, Kiribati, Denmark and Micronesia.

== Tobacco control ==
Tobacco is sold only at designated shops at a fixed price set by the government. (Note: Law of the Democratic People's Republic of Korea on Tobacco Control 2009, Articles 22 and 23) As of 2014, a 20-pack of the most common cigarette brand costs 246.38 KPW (US$2.51), whilst the cheapest 20-pack sells for as little as 7.47 won (US$0.08).

North Korea has set up specific government objectives for tobacco control and there is a national agency to implement them, with eight full-time staff members. Although there is no free of charge smoking cessation quitline that smokers could phone and discuss their problems, most healthcare facilities offer support in cessation, including cessation programs and nicotine replacement therapy. Costs are covered for the patient partially, or in full by the state. In addition to regular healthcare clinics, there are eleven specialized anti-smoking centers in the country where consultation is free, but medicine is not. Of medicines, bupropion and varenicline are not legally available in North Korea, but herbal medicines are used as smoking cessation aids.

There have been attempts at anti-smoking movements "across the generations" in the country, with the earliest major campaign taking place in 2004. While early campaigns had little effect, they have become more frequent in the 2010s and restrictions on smoking have been observed more closely in recent years; consequently, since the early-2000s; smoking rates have started to decline. There are signs that the North Korean government takes anti-smoking campaigns more seriously than they did in the past. According to the WHO, North Korea now "keenly celebrates World No Tobacco Day (WNTD) every year and disseminates information about tobacco use and its effect on health. The Government persuades public health institutions and the media to spread the information about the health effects of tobacco and its adverse impact on environmental protection and economic development."

=== Law ===
Smoking legislation in North Korea has tightened in recent years, although it is still relatively lax and has not had any really meaningful effect on curtailing smoking rates. The rules on where people can or cannot smoke are complex, with smoking prohibited on pavements, ferries, aircraft and at stations, in healthcare and educational facilities, pre-schools and nurseries, shops, theaters, cinemas, culture halls and conference rooms, historic and battle sites, and hotel lobbies. (Note: Law of the Democratic People's Republic of Korea on Tobacco Control 2009, Articles 27 and 28) However, smoking is not prohibited in either private or work vehicles or on-board trains, at bus stops, near entrances to buildings, in universities, government offices, workplaces, restaurants, cafes, bars, or nightclubs.

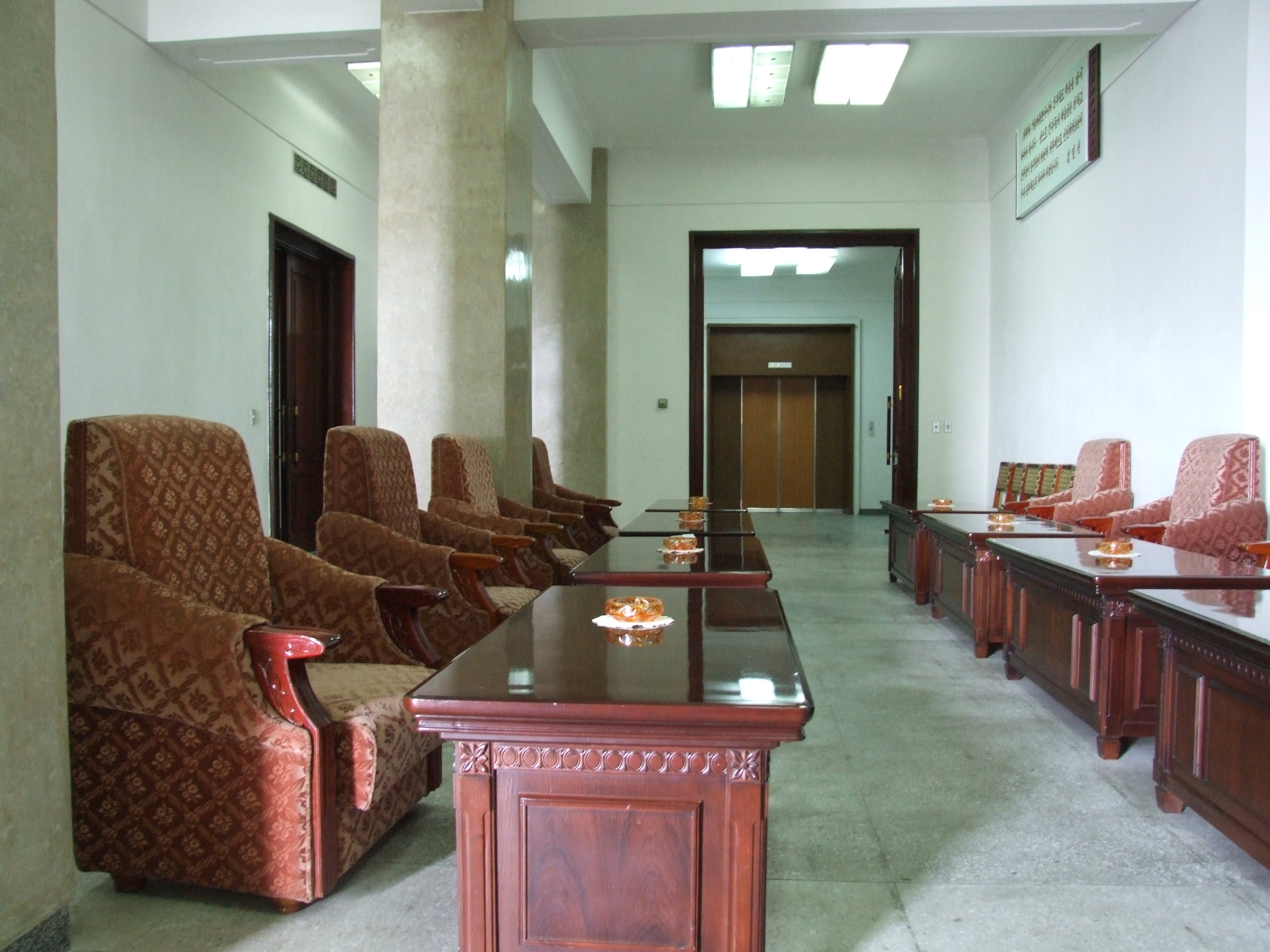
A smoking lounge at the Grand People's Study House in Pyongyang

Some of the legislation is observed with high levels of compliance, but not uniformly throughout the country. There are not mandatory fines for smoking transgressions, although the newest 2016 anti-smoking campaign has seen fines issued and offenders threatened with images of them being broadcast on TV. Tobacco packaging warning messages are required on all types of packaging, but their appearance is not regulated in any way. They are usually printed in small print on the side of the package and only state that smoking is harmful to health. However, the descriptions must state the nicotine and tar content, (Note: Law of the Democratic People's Republic of Korea on Tobacco Control 2009, Article 12) must not be misleading and do need to be approved by local authorities. Graphic warning images that are now common worldwide have never appeared on packaging in North Korea. Since the creation of the smoking prohibition act in 2020, there are now posters at smoking places displaying graphic images of the effects of smoking, including images of gangrene and lip cancer.

There are no restrictions on tobacco advertising, although there are no advertising campaigns of any kind in North Korean media. Tobacco may not be sold to minors (Note: Law of the Democratic People's Republic of Korea on Tobacco Control 2009, Article 24) (those under the age of seventeen) and cigarette machines are banned. (Note: Law of the Democratic People's Republic of Korea on Tobacco Control 2009, Article 22) North Korea imposes no kind of tobacco tax at all, including specific excise, ad valorem excise, value-added tax, sales tax, or import duty. Electronic cigarettes are legal.

North Korea signed the WHO Framework Convention on Tobacco Control on 17 June 2003 and ratified it on 27 April 2005.

In 2020, a new legislation concerning smoking was created with a total of 31 articles. The law bans the smoking of cigarettes in public and commercial places such as at childcare, medical and educational facilities, restaurants, at locations where smoking would be a hazard and at welfare service amenities. This law also restricts the sale of cigarettes to only licensed shops. The law also created a tobacco cessation service which will also provide treatment and publicity campaigns against smoking. Before this law, the fine was not encouraged and the penalty was minimal.

== Tobacco industry ==
The tobacco industry in North Korea is substantial, with 53,000 hectares (2.3% of its arable land) dedicated to tobacco cultivation. This is the fourth-highest percentage of arable land dedicated to tobacco in the world, with the annual output exceeding 80,000 tonnes, making North Korea one of the top 25 tobacco producers worldwide. The best, strongest and most expensive tobacco comes from the region near the border with China.

There are many North Korean tobacco companies, making some 30 different types of cigarettes, with the biggest tobacco company being the North Korea General Tobacco Corporation. Some companies export tobacco to the Middle East and elsewhere, sometimes in partnership with foreign firms. For example, the Taedong River Tobacco Company (대동강담배합영회사) and the Rason Shinhung Tobacco Company (라선신흥담배회사), both operating in the Rason Special Economic Zone, are partnered with the Chinese Jilin Tobacco. British American Tobacco also has business in the country, but it has reduced its involvement due to political pressure and public relations reasons. During the Cold War, North Korea paid for goods it imported from the Soviet Union with poor quality tobacco. Later, during the years of the Sunshine Policy, high-end Pyongyang brand cigarettes were exported to South Korea where they were popular among South Koreans who wanted to express a pro-reunification stance. There are some privately owned tobacco factories, some of which are known to produce counterfeit brand cigarettes for export as part of North Korea's illicit activities to earn hard currency. North Korea is one of the largest producers of counterfeit cigarettes in the world.

Leaf tobacco is cheap and can be bought from markets to roll one's own cigarettes. Many rural farmers produce homegrown tobacco on their own plot of land, while others steal tobacco from co-operative farms for sale.

== See also ==
- Azalea (chimpanzee) – North Korean smoking chimpanzee
- Beer in North Korea
- Cannabis in North Korea
- Health effects of tobacco
- Health in North Korea
- Korea Sogyong Trading
- List of countries by cigarette consumption per capita
- Prevalence of tobacco use
- Smoking age
- Smoking in China
- Smoking in South Korea
- Women and smoking
