= Louis R. Cheney =

American politician (1859–1944)

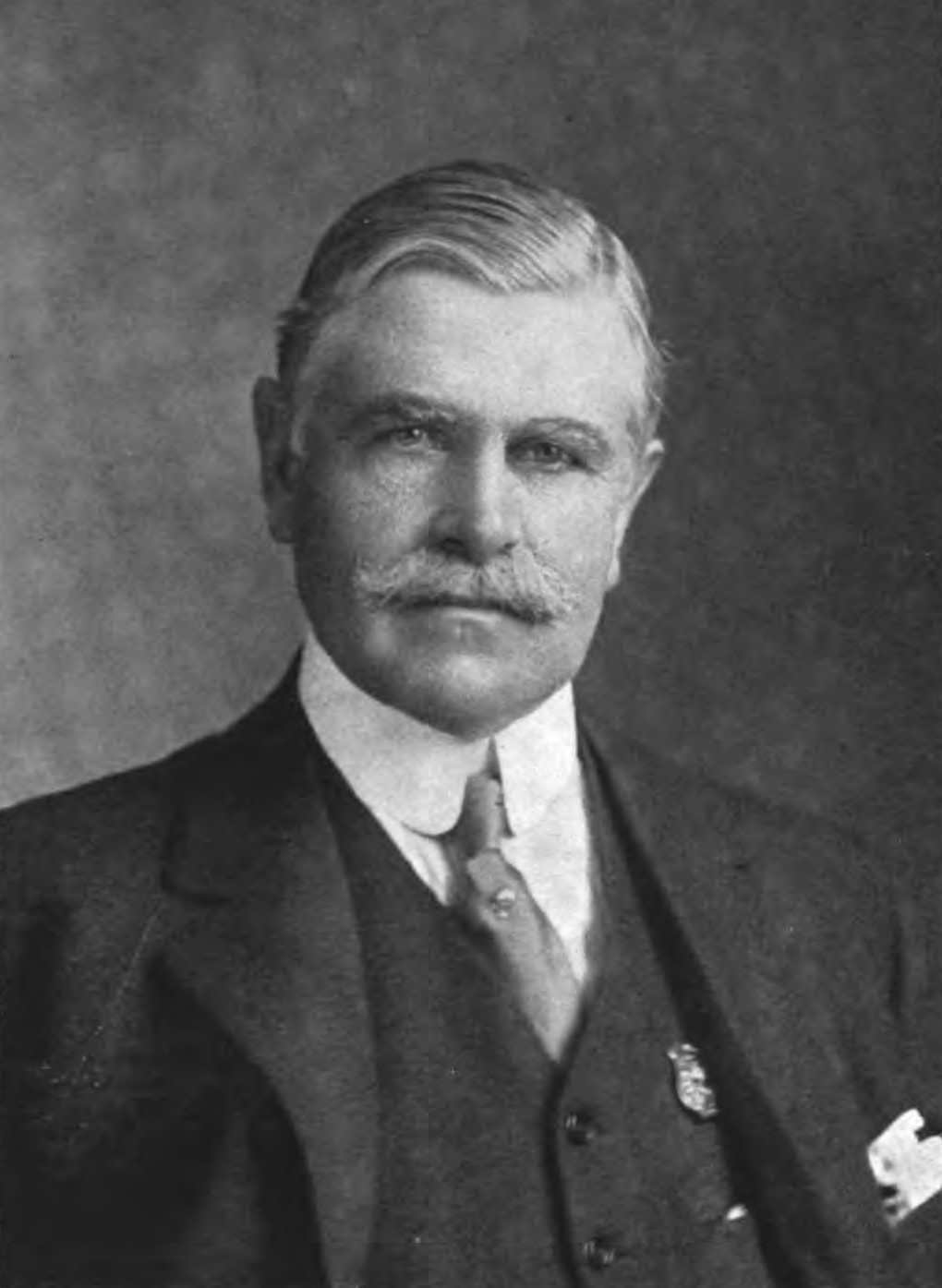

36th Mayor of Hartford, Connecticut
- In office April 2, 1912 – April 7, 1914
- Preceded by: Edward L. Smith
- Succeeded by: Joseph H. Lawler

Personal details
- Born: Louis Richmond Cheney; April 27, 1859 South Manchester, Connecticut, U.S.
- Died: December 17, 1944 (aged 85) Hartford, Connecticut, U.S.
- Party: Republican
- Occupation: Silk merchant

Louis Richmond Cheney (1859–1944) was a businessman and political figure from Connecticut.

== Early life ==
Cheney was born in South Manchester, Connecticut, on April 27, 1859. He was the son of George Wells Cheney and Harriet K. (Richmond) Cheney and the great-grandson of Captain Timothy Cheney, who served in the Connecticut militia during the American Revolution. He graduated from Hartford Public High School in 1879.

== Marriages ==
On April 16, 1890, he married Mary Alice Robinson (1856–1926), daughter of the late Lucius F. Robinson and Eliza (Trumbull) Robinson. They for the parents of one daughter who married John T. Roberts. Mary Cheney died on May 8, 1926. His second wife was Margaret Bennett Crain (1874–1940) whom he married on December 8, 1933. She was the widow of Robert Crain, a prominent lawyer of Baltimore, Maryland.

== Business ==
After graduating high school, Cheney was employed by Cheney Brothers silk manufacturing company of Manchester, Connecticut. Cheney Brothers was founded by his father and five uncles in 1838 and owned the landmark Cheney Building in Hartford. He worked for four years in their sales department in New York City.

In addition to the silk business, he was President of the Hartford Chamber of Commerce, from 1915 to 1916 and 1923 to 1924. He was also a director of the Connecticut River Banking Company, of the Phoenix Mutual Life Insurance Company, the Hartford Electric Light Company, Colts Patent Fire Arms Manufacturing Company, the Phoenix and Connecticut Fire Insurance Companies, the Automatic Refrigerating Company, Connecticut River Bridge and Highway District.

He was also a trustee of the Hartford-Connecticut Trust Company, the American School for the Deaf, the Institute for the Blind, the Hartford Retreat for the Insane and the Loomis Institute preparatory school. He was president of the Hartford Hospital, the Hartford Morris Plan Bank, and Honorary President of the Hartford Council of Boy Scouts. He was president of Hartford Hospital and served on its board of directors for over 40 years.

== Military ==
Cheney served, with the rank of colonel, as quartermaster general of the Connecticut Militia from 1895 to 1897. In 1898 he was reduced in rank to major and commanded the socially elite 1st Company of the Governor's Foot Guard. He commanded this unit until 1903 and again from 1907 to 1909.

== Politics ==
Cheney was elected a councilman and alderman in Hartford and served for five years. He was then elected mayor of Hartford as a Republican and served from 1912 to 1914. In 1914 he represented Hartford at the Millenary Celebration of Hertford, England, for which Hartford was named. He also served as a member of the Connecticut State Senate from 1915 to 1917.

== Memberships ==
Cheney was elected as an honorary member of the Connecticut Society of the Cincinnati in 1914. He was also a member of the Sons of the American Revolution, the Society of Colonial Wars (served as Governor of the Connecticut Society from 1910 to 1912), Military Order of Foreign Wars (served as Commander of the Connecticut Commandery), the General Society of Mayflower Descendants and the Order of the Founders and Patriots of America.

He was also a member of the Hartford Club (of which Mark Twain and J.P. Morgan were also members), the Hartford Golf Club, the Union League Club of New York, and of many sports men's clubs. He was also chairman of the several Red Cross fund raising campaigns starting in 1917, when the United States entered the First World War.

== Residences ==
Cheney lived at 40 Woodland Street in Hartford and had a summer home, named Tholassa Cottage, on Eastern Point in York Harbor, Maine.

== Death ==
He died at his home in Hartford on December 17, 1944, at the age of 85 years, 234 days. He was interred in the East Cemetery in Manchester, Connecticut.
