= Korea Sogyong Trading =

- Chosŏn'gŭl: 조선서경무역회사
- Revised Romanization: Joseon Seogyeong Mu-yeok Hoesa
- McCune–Reischauer: Chosŏn Sŏkyŏng Muyŏk Hoesa

The Korea Sogyong Trading Corporation is a North Korean company that exports carpets and manufactures cigarettes.

== Origins ==
Its cigarette manufacturing business began in September 2001 when it formed a 40%-60% joint venture with British American Tobacco called Taesong-BAT. As of 2005, when the venture became known to the public, Taesong-BAT employed 200 people in Pyongyang and produced 2 billion cigarettes per year.

== See also ==
- Smoking in North Korea
