= John F. Crosby (attorney) =

American lawyer

United States Attorney for the District of Connecticut
- In office 1918–1919
- President: Woodrow Wilson
- Preceded by: Thomas J. Spellacy
- Succeeded by: Edward L. Smith

Personal details
- Born: John Francis Crosby; October 26, 1889 Fond du Lac, Wisconsin
- Died: December 10, 1962 (aged 73) Spring Lake, New Jersey
- Education: Georgetown University (BA); Harvard University (LLB)
- Profession: Lawyer

John Francis Crosby (October 26, 1889 – December 10, 1962) was an American attorney who served as the United States Attorney for the District of Connecticut under two presidents. He also served as the Assistant U.S. Attorney General.

== Biography ==
Born in Wisconsin, John would move up and down the east coast during his lifetime. He worked as an attorney serving as the US Attorney for Connecticut and the assistant US Attorney General. After attending Georgetown Preparatory School, he was the Valedictorian from Georgetown University in 1912 and went to Harvard Law School after that.

He died on December 10, 1962, at his home in Spring Lake, New Jersey.
