= Hartford College of Law =

Former law school in Hartford, Connecticut

The Hartford College of Law was a law school operating in Hartford, Connecticut, from October 25, 1921, to October 27, 1948, when it was fully merged into the University of Connecticut, which had taken over administrative control of the school by lease in 1942.

The school had close ties to the Travelers Insurance Company, and in 1939 also established the Hartford College of Insurance. After this establishment, it was sometimes referred to as the Hartford College of Law and Insurance. In 1943, an act of the state legislature permitted the University of Connecticut to take over the institution for a trial period of five years, to determine whether the University could effectively operate it. At the end of that time, the operation of the college having been deemed successful, it was then permanently absorbed by the University as the University of Connecticut School of Law.

It was founded by three lawyers one of them Allan K. Smith served as a United States Attorney while teaching there. Alumni of the institution include Louis Shapiro, a past Justice of the Connecticut Supreme Court.

== See also ==
- List of defunct law schools in the United States
