= Frank Bergin =

American football player, coach, and official (1886–1971)

Biographical details
- Born: July 5, 1886; New Haven, Connecticut, U.S.
- Died: November 11, 1971 (aged 85); New Haven, Connecticut, U.S.

Playing career
- 1907–1909: Princeton
- Position: Quarterback

Coaching career (HC unless noted)
- 1910–1912: Bowdoin
- 1913: Middlebury

Head coaching record
- Overall: 12–14–3

Accomplishments and honors

Championships
- 1 MIAA (1910)

Frank Bergin

Member of the Connecticut Senate from the 10th district

United States Attorney for the District of Connecticut
- In office 1933–1934
- President: Franklin D. Roosevelt
- Preceded by: John Buckley
- Succeeded by: George H. Cohen

Personal details
- Born: Frank S. Bergin; July 5, 1886 New Haven, Connecticut
- Died: November 11, 1971 (aged 85) New Haven, Connecticut

Frank S. Bergin (July 5, 1886 – November 11, 1971) was an American college football player, coach, and official.

Bergin played football as a quarterback at Princeton University from 1907 to 1909. Bergin was the head football coach at Bowdoin College from 1910 to 1912 and Middlebury College in 1913, compiling a career college football coaching record of 12–14–3. He refereed college football games for several years after World War I. Bergin served in the Connecticut Senate, representing the 10th district in New Haven, and was the chairman of Connecticut Liquor Control Commission. He died on November 11, 1971, at the age of 85.

Bergin was born on July 5, 1886, in New Haven, Connecticut. He graduated from Phillips Exeter Academy in 1906, Princeton in 1910, and Columbia Law School in 1913.

== Head coaching record ==
Year	Team	Overall	Conference	Standing	Bowl/playoffs
Bowdoin Polar Bears (Maine Intercollegiate Athletic Association) (1910–1912)
1910	Bowdoin	6–1–2		1st	
1911	Bowdoin	2–3–1			
1912	Bowdoin	2–6			
Bowdoin:		10–10–3			
Middlebury (Independent) (1913)
1913	Middlebury	2–4			
Middlebury:		12–14–3			
Total:		12–14–3			
National championship Conference title Conference division title or championship game berth
