= Women and smoking =

Tobacco consumption among women

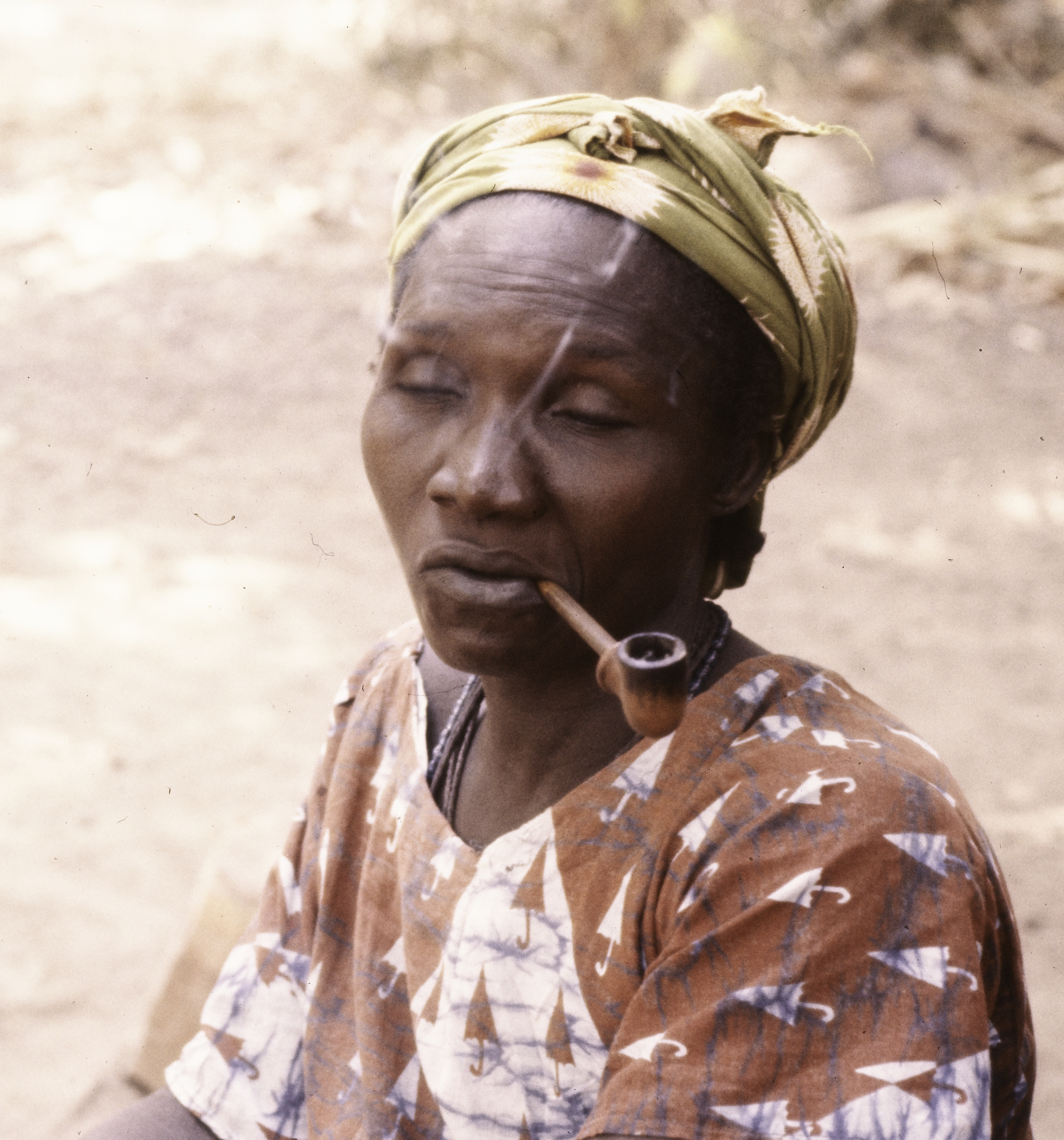
Woman smoking a pipe while cooking. Guinea-Bissau, 1974

Tobacco smoking has serious negative effects on the body. A wide variety of diseases and medical phenomena affect the sexes differently, and the same holds true for the effects of tobacco. Since the proliferation of tobacco, many cultures have viewed smoking as a masculine vice, and as such the majority of research into the specific differences between men and women with regard to the effects of tobacco have only been studied in-depth in recent years.

== Countries and regions ==
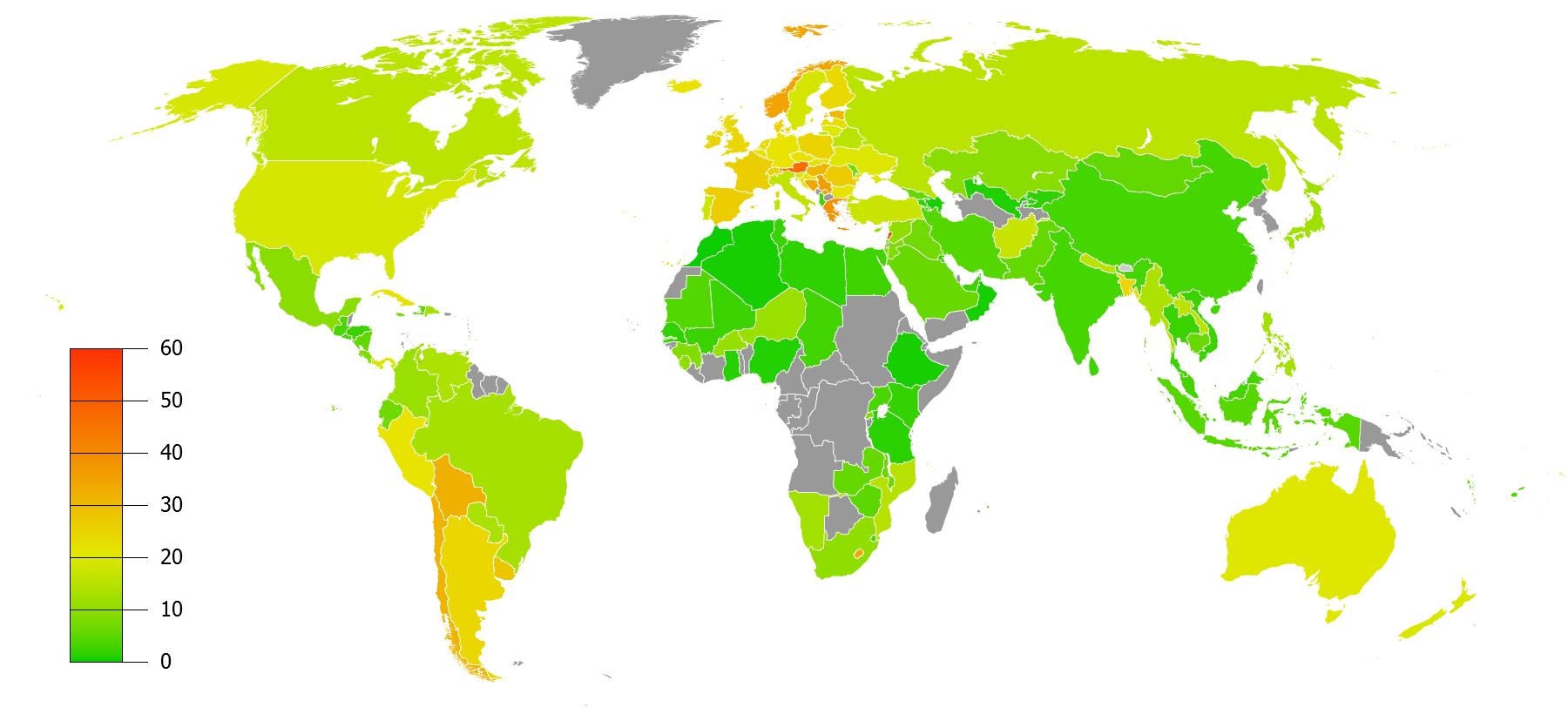
Female smoking by country in 2008

=== Gaza ===
In 2010 the Hamas-led Islamist government of Gaza imposed a ban on women smoking the popular nargilas in public. A spokesman for the Interior Ministry explained that "It is inappropriate for a woman to sit cross-legged and smoke in public. It harms the image of our people." The ban was soon lifted later that year and women returned to smoking in popular venues like the cafe of Gaza's Crazy Water Park. The park was burned down by masked men in September 2010, after being closed by the Hamas. The Committee for the Propagation of Virtue and the Prevention of Vice (Gaza Strip) has arrested women for smoking in public.

=== Japan ===
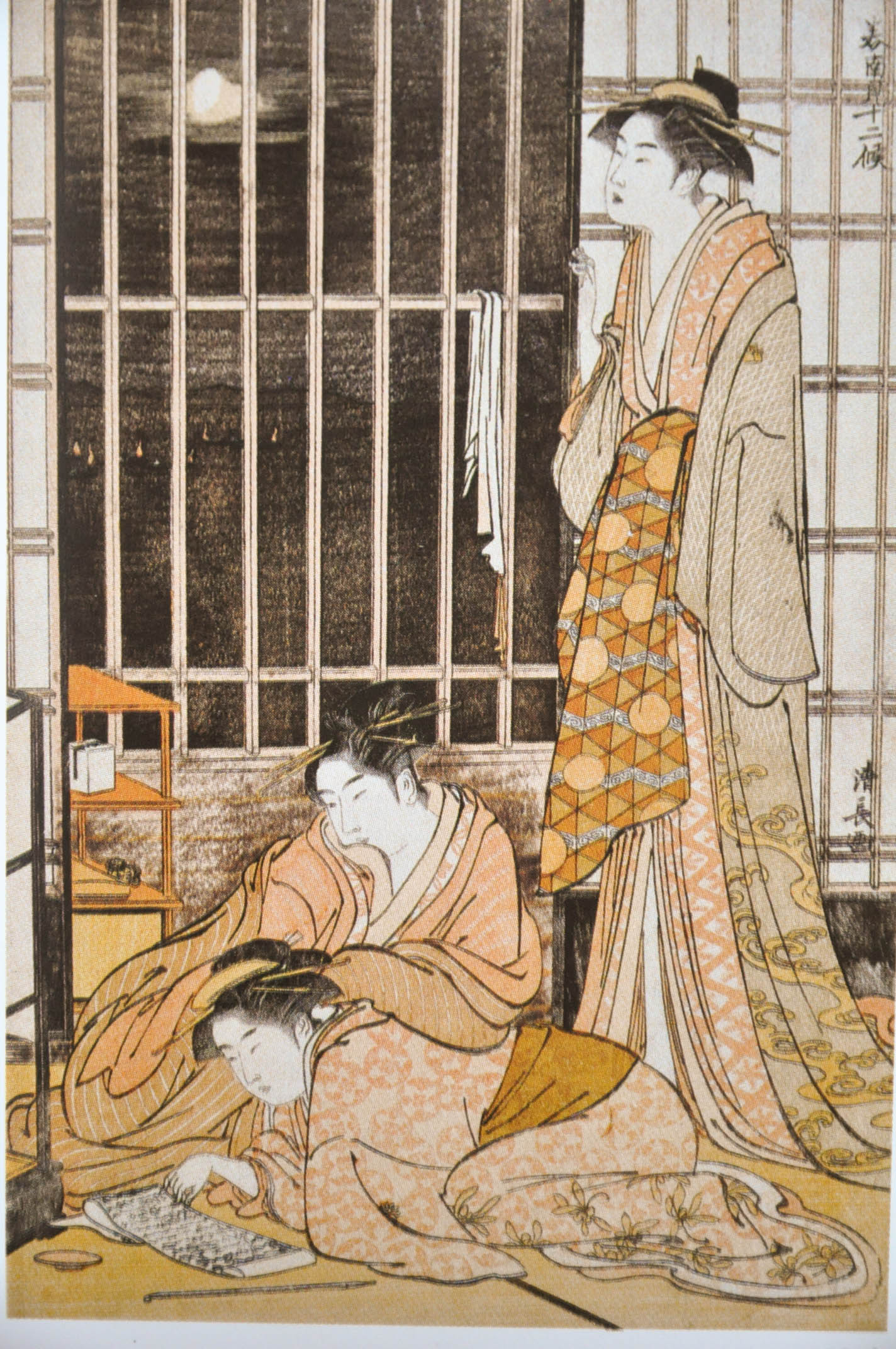
Kiseru pipe on a brothel's floor

In Edo period or earlier than it, tobacco had come to Japan. Prostitutes (ja:遊女, yūjo) were the main smokers among Japanese women by the early 19th century.

=== United States ===
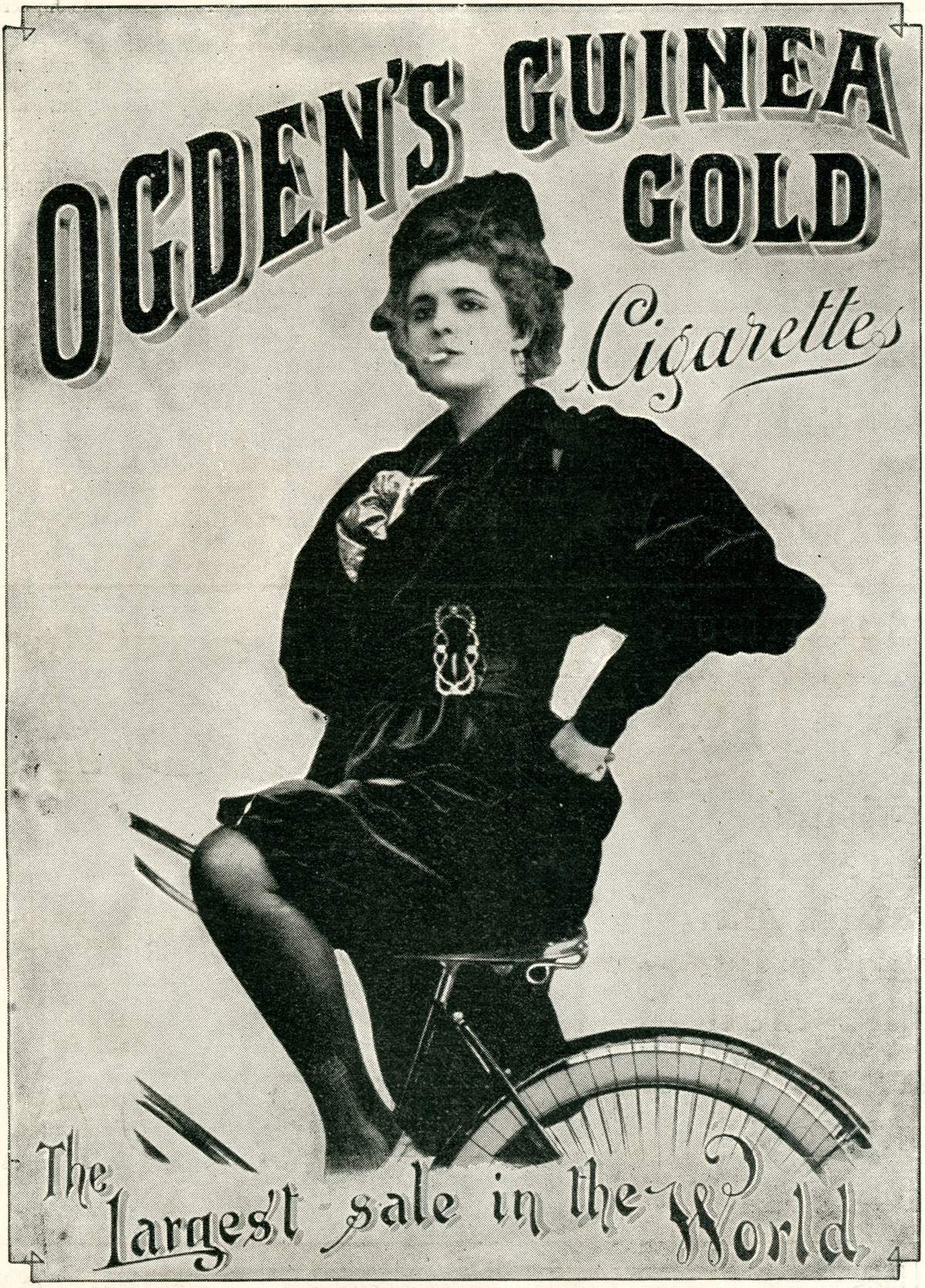
1900 cigarette ad; targeting women is not a new strategy.

== General health effects ==
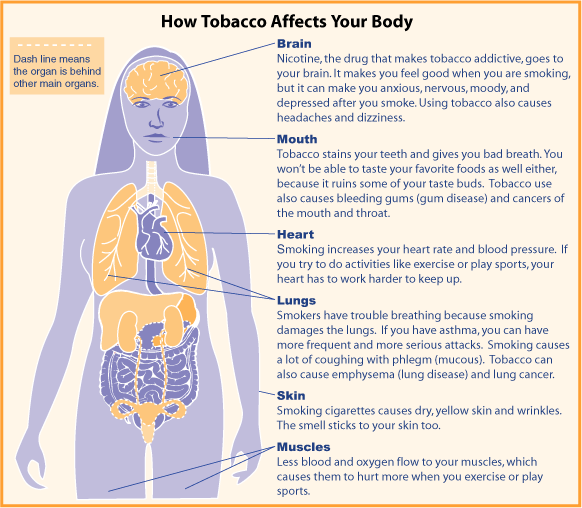
"How Tobacco Affects Your Body", by the Office on Women's Health in the Office of the Assistant Secretary for Health

According to the Centers for Disease Control and Prevention, cigarette smoking is the leading cause of preventable death in the United States and produces substantial health-related economic costs to society. During the time between 1995 and 1999, smoking resulted in approximately 440,000 premature deaths per year and about $157 billion in "health-related economic losses". Smoking has been known to increase to the risks of, and has been linked to, a plethora of adverse health effects. For instance, "Cigarette smoking accounts for about one-third of all cancers, including 90 percent of lung cancer cases. [Smoking also] causes lung diseases such as chronic bronchitis and emphysema, [and can] increase the risk of heart disease, including stroke, heart attack, vascular disease, and aneurysm." According to the Surgeon General's Report of 2004, titled "The Health Consequences of Smoking", other consequences of smoking include increased risk of cataracts, lowered levels of antioxidants, especially vitamin C, heightened inflammation, and periodontitis.

== Unique gender differences and health effects for women ==
In the United States, although general rates of smoking are declining – "24.1% in 1998 to 20.6% in 2008", and there are higher rates among men – the gendered health consequences illustrate that women are at a greater disadvantage. "In 2008, smoking prevalence was higher among men (23%) than women (18.3%)"; however that gender gap appears to be narrowing. Prior to recent increasing smoking rates, women usually experienced different effects of smoking compared to men. For instance, a decrease in lifetime expectancy is greater for female smokers compared to male smokers. On average, while an adult male loses 13.2 years due to smoking, an adult female smoker loses 14.5 years of life. This decreased life expectancy for male smokers mirrors the gender differences in life expectancy overall. However, when it comes to smokers in particular, males tend to smoke more heavily than women do. Yet still women continue to show more deleterious results.

As previously mentioned, smoking is attributable to the majority of lung cancer cases. Over the years lung cancer mortality has dramatically increased among women. "In 1987, lung cancer surpassed breast cancer to become the leading cause of cancer death among U.S. women." Smoking now accounts for 80% of lung cancer deaths among women. Although there has been a more pronounced campaign to raise funds for breast cancer research and a possible cure, more women are dying from lung cancer. Research also continues to question whether women tend to be more susceptible to lung cancer, regardless of similar exposure as their male counterparts. However, making a definitive answer has been difficult, and the issue remains controversial. Chronic obstructive pulmonary disease (COPD) is another major issue among women who smoke. The risk of having COPD is increased with amount and duration and smoking accounts for 90 percent of COPD mortalities.

The effects of smoking on cardiovascular health also shows sex differences. Heart diseases continue to be the leading cause of death nationwide, and one of the risk factors is smoking. Unique to women, smoking lowers their estrogen and their high-density lipoproteins that prevent arteries from blockage. For many women the effects of smoking on the heart's health become obvious later on in life. Among current female smokers, "the chance of dying from heart disease or lung cancer exceeds the chance of dying from breast cancer from 40 on (and does so by at least a factor of 5 after age 55)." The habit becomes particularly crucial when women are also taking birth control because these two in concert increases, even more so, women's chances of having a stroke or a heart attack.

When observing older women, those who smoke in their postmenopausal stages tend to have a lower bone density along with more hip fractures when compared to their non-smoker counterparts. For the younger cohort of women, during their reproductive stages, smoking affects their reproductive health as well as pregnancy outcomes. Research has revealed that smoking makes it more difficult for women to conceive and it can also result in infertility. Women who smoke while they are pregnant increase their chances of having an early delivery and low-birth weight babies. One of the many serious effects on the fetus itself is sudden infant death syndrome (SIDS). Studies have shown that "infants of mothers who smoke during and after pregnancy are 3 to 4 times more likely to die from sudden infant death syndrome (SIDS) than babies to non-smoking mothers". Smoking during pregnancy could also cause stillbirth, preterm birth, placental abruption. It can also cause Premature menopause.

== The future: women, smoking, and globalization ==
As smoking levels decline in the developed world, they are increasing in the developing world. The major cigarette manufacturers have more than tripled the number of cigarettes exported in the last 35 years. Tobacco companies are using similar strategies to attract women in other countries that they used in the early days of attracting American women. Offering appealing ads that depict cigarettes as modern, empowering, and liberating draws in women smokers who make every effort to be as western as possible. The smoking bans occurring in the United States are happening around the globe. In other countries (as in the United States), tobacco manufacturers circumvent advertising restrictions by sponsoring events, retail endorsements, and advertising in alternative markets such as satellite television channels. These methods have proven quite successful for the tobacco industry. Overwhelmingly, in the global market the trends point toward the market becoming increasingly female in the future.

=== Delving deeper: Women, smoking and globalization ===
When discussing smoking among women it is crucial to also take into account the fact that smoking, and tobacco use in general, is a global issue that is not confined to the borders of the Western world. The World Health Organization (WHO) notes the stark difference between women in various geographic locations as it states that "[a]bout 22 percent of women in developed countries and 9 percent of women in developing countries smoke tobacco". However, numerically the number of women could be more in developing countries.

In his article, Fred C. Pampel looks into why these differences may exist and suggests reasons pertaining to gender equality, cigarette diffusion, economic factors and smoking policies. For women in countries where traditional gender roles have changed, it becomes more socially acceptable for women to initiate smoking. However, this evidence should not hinder a deeper look into the smoking among women in developed countries.

Though the rates of smoking among people in developed countries are on a slow decline, smoking rates among middle and low-income countries are increasing. This particularly affects women within developing regions because they are most at risk when male cigarette use is high. About 70% of tobacco users live in developing countries, and about half of the men in these countries are smokers. Although women are not mainly the ones to smoke, they are still exposed to environmental tobacco smoke (ETS). When among men who smoke, the risks of passive smoking increase for women whether they are at home or at work. Smoking and second-hand smoke not only affects the female body but has detrimental results on the health of their children. This issue is compounded in developing nations that may already have limited medical care for women.

A study that focused on pregnant women in a few Latin American and African countries, India and Pakistan showed that "[w]omen in Latin America had the highest level of tobacco use." The probability of living with a tobacco user was also high in Latin America but highest in Asia. Argentina and Uruguay had the highest percentages of women who were once regular smokers, who had smoked during their current pregnancy and who thought it was acceptable for women to smoke. One-fifth of the world's largest tobacco producers are in the Latin American region, which includes Argentina and Brazil. With such increased production in these countries, the prices of cigarettes are significantly lowered. In these two latter countries, a pack of premium cigarettes such as the Marlboro brand can cost between US$1 and US$1.99, rendering cigarettes more accessible and encouraging more consumption. This has serious implications for the population as whole. The smoking rates among women alone are also a point of concern. In Argentina, 22.6% of the women smoke, while in other countries such as Uruguay the percentage is 25.1 percent.

As the rate of tobacco use among men is predicted to decrease, the rate among women is estimated to rise to 20% of the woman population by 2025. A major catalyst for this increase in smoking among women is globalization because it allows for the increase in the marketing of tobacco products to middle and low-income areas. In their efforts to expand their markets, multinational tobacco companies are paying particular attention to women. The advertisements tend to include words such as 'menthol', 'mild' and 'light,' and seek out women through "alluring marketing campaigns, linking smoking with emancipation and glamour". Consequently, the rates of tobacco use among women in regions such as Asia, Africa and Latin America have increased. The lack of strict tobacco control policies in developing countries sets up an environment where little to no advertising restrictions and taxation are in place to buffer the impending increase in smoking among women. What puts women in developing regions at an even greater disadvantage is the significant shift in tobacco production to their areas, where they are mainly involved in the harvesting.

With all these influences, cessation can be very difficult for women. There has been research surrounding this topic among many developed nations in order to explore and find the most successful methods, even for women. Many of these studies have expressed that women who attempt to quit on their own "were less likely to quit initially or to remain abstinent at follow up". When speaking of women in developing countries, however, they would experience added barriers due to their low-income status. While women in the developed countries have cessation programs available, not many programs are available to women in developing countries. The latter group of women could significantly benefit from educational programs that teach of the adverse effects of smoking on their health as well as the health of their children. Although these programs may not be set in place in the various areas they are most needed, several organizations have made an effort to draw smoking among women to the public's attention. For instance, the World Health Organization (WHO) published The Tobacco Atlas which is helpful in showing the scope of the issue among women on a worldwide scale. This organization has also negotiated the Framework Convention on Tobacco Control which is a treaty supported by 164 Parties and was done "in response to the globalization of the tobacco epidemic". This initiative has been particular about pointing out how women are also being affected. In sum, when looking at smoking among women beyond the boundaries of the Western world, the full scope of the issue comes into view.

== See also ==
- History of nicotine marketing
- Nicotine marketing
- Ovarian cancer
