= List of first women lawyers and judges in Connecticut =

This is a list of the first women lawyer(s) and judge(s) in Connecticut. It includes the year in which the women were admitted to practice law (in parentheses). Also included are women who achieved other distinctions such becoming the first in their state to graduate from law school or become a political figure.

== Firsts in Connecticut's history ==
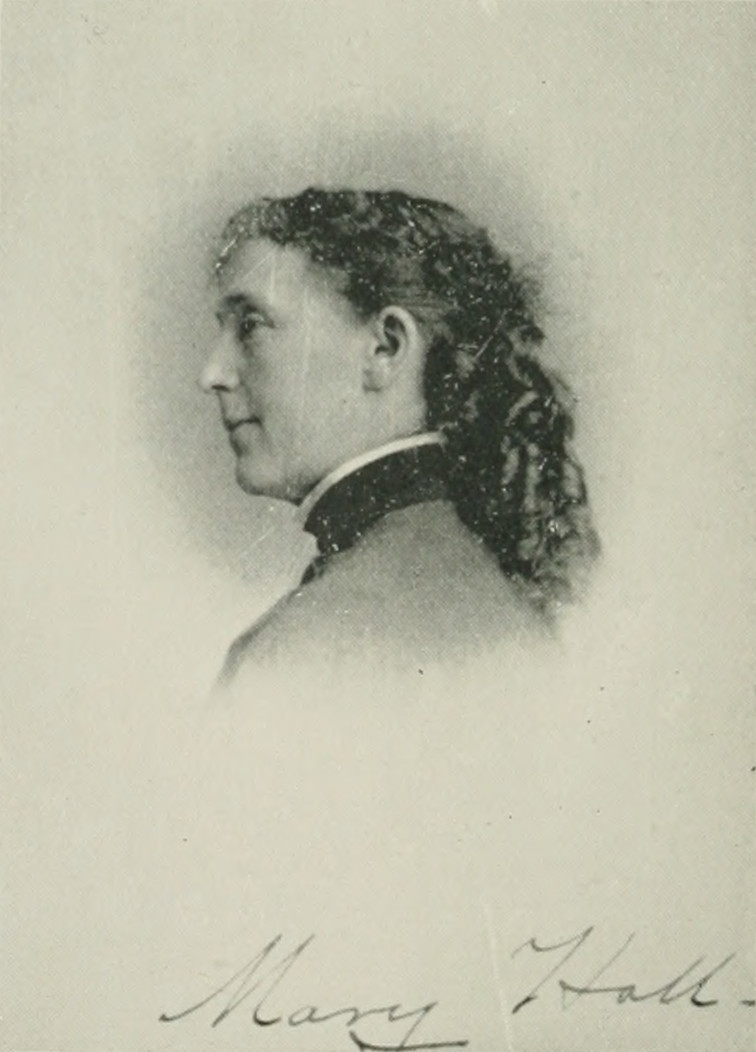
Mary Hall: First female lawyer in Connecticut (1882)

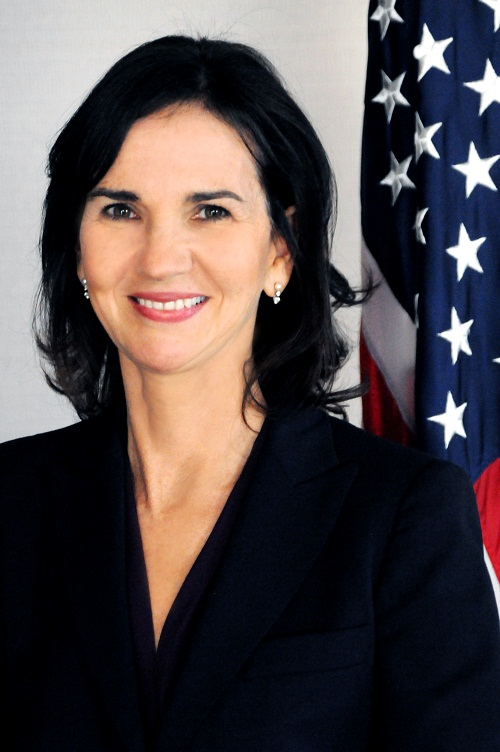
Deirdre M. Daly: First female U.S. Attorney in Connecticut (2014)

=== Lawyers ===
- First female: Mary Hall (1882)
- First female to appear before the Connecticut Supreme Court: J. Agnes Burns (1925)
- First females to serve as municipal court prosecutors: Shirley R. Bysiewicz and Lillian Malley Vernon c. 1951
- First African American female: Bessye Anita Warren Bennett (1974)
- First African American female to open a law practice: Patricia Harleston (1974) in 1975
- First Latino American (female) prosecutor: Rosita "Bae" Cremer (1978)
- First Asian Pacific Islander female: Elizabeth Yen (1980)
- First openly lesbian: Brooke Goff (2015)
- First DACA-recipient (female): Denia Perez in 2018

=== Law clerk ===
- First Latino American female (Chief Deputy Clerk; United States District Court for the District of Connecticut): Elsie M. Mata in 2006

=== State judges ===
- First female (justice of the peace): Alice J. O'Neill in 1921
- First female (juvenile court): Margaret Connors Driscoll in 1960
- First female (trial court/circuit court): JoAnne Kulawiz in 1972
- First female (Superior Court of Connecticut): Ellen Bree Burns (1947) in 1976
- First female (Connecticut Supreme Court): Ellen Ash Peters (1954) in 1978
- First female (Connecticut Court of Appeals/Chief Judge): Antoinette Dupont in 1984
- First female (Chief Justice; Connecticut Supreme Court): Ellen Ash Peters (1954) in 1984
- First African American female: E. Curtissa R. Cofield in 1991
- First Hispanic American (female): Carmen E. Espinosa in 1992
- First Asian American (female): Nina F. Elgo (1990) in 2004
- First Portuguese American female: Maria Araújo Kahn (1989) in 2006
- First Hispanic American female (Connecticut Court of Appeals): Carmen E. Espinosa in 2011
- First Hispanic American (female; Family Support Magistrate): Norma Sanchez-Figueroa in 2011
- First Hispanic American female (Connecticut Supreme Court): Carmen E. Espinosa in 2013
- First Asian American (female) (Connecticut Court of Appeals): Nina F. Elgo (1990) in 2018
- First African American female (Connecticut Court of Appeals): Melanie L. Cradle in 2020

=== Federal judges ===
- First female (U.S. Court of Appeals for the Second Circuit): Susan L. Carney (1977):
- First female (U.S. District Court for the District of Connecticut): Ellen Bree Burns (1947) in 1978
- First female (U.S. Magistrate Judge for the District of Connecticut): Joan G. Margolis in 1985
- First female (Chief Judge; U.S. District Court for the District of Connecticut): Ellen Bree Burns (1947) in 1988
- First South Asian (female) (U.S. District Court for the District of Connecticut): Sarala Nagala in 2021
- First Latino American female (U.S. District Court for the District of Connecticut): Maria Eugenia Garcia in 2022

=== Attorney General of Connecticut ===
- First female: Clarine Nardi Riddle (1974) from 1989-1991

=== Deputy Attorney General ===
- First female: Clarine Nardi Riddle (1974) in 1986

=== Associate Attorney General ===
- First African American (female; Administration and Management): Antoria Howard in 2013

=== Assistant Attorney General ===
- First Asian American (female): Nina F. Elgo (1990) in 2000

=== United States Attorney ===
- First female (acting): Nora Dannehy from 2008-2010
- First female: Deidre M. Daly in 2014
- First African American (female): Vanessa R. Avery in 2022

=== Assistant United States Attorney ===
- First African American female: Cheryl Brown Wattley in 1978
- First Latino American female: Carmen E. Espinosa in 1980
- First Pacific Islander (female): Carolyn Ikari in 1995
- First South Asian (female): Krishna Patel in 1999

=== State's Attorney ===
- First African American (female): Gail Petteway Hardy in 2007

=== Assistant State's Attorney ===
- First female: Anne C. Dranginis (1972) in 1977
- First African American (female) to serve as a Supervisory Assistant State's Attorney: Juliett L. Crawford in 1988

=== Public Defenders ===
- First female: Ellen B. Lubell around 1977
- First Latino American female: Ramona Mercado-Espinoza in 1987
- First African American female: Claudia Jones in 2013
- First African American (female) to serve as the Chief Public Defender: TaShun Bowden-Lewis in 2022

=== Assistant Public Defender ===
- First Latino American (female) to act as a Supervisory Assistant Public Defender: Grace Cavero Feliú in 1998

=== Connecticut Bar Association ===
- First female (president): Marilyn Seichter from 1989-1990
- First African American (female; secretary): Juliett L. Crawford in 1994
- First Asian American and Pacific Island (female; treasurer): Elizabeth Yen in 1999
- First female (executive director): Alice A. Bruno in 2012
- First African American (female; president): Karen DeMeola in 2017
- First Asian Pacific American (female; president): Amy Lin Meyerson in 2020
- First Hispanic American (female; president): Maggie I. Castinado in 2023

== Firsts in local history ==
- Vivien Hall Root: First female lawyer in Fairfield County, Connecticut (c. 1905)
- Dianne Andersen (c. 1950s): First female lawyer in Danbury, Connecticut [Fairfield County, Connecticut]
- Dianne Yamen: First female probate judge in Danbury, Connecticut (1990) [Fairfield County, Connecticut]
- Mary Hall (1882): First female lawyer in Hartford County, Connecticut
- Catherine Kligerman: First female to serve as the President of the Hartford County Bar Association, Connecticut (1990)
- Eboni S. Nelson: First African American (female) to serve as the Dean of the University of Connecticut School of Law (2020)
- Susan C. O'Neill: First female lawyer in Waterbury, New Haven County, Connecticut
- Ellen B. Lubell: First female to serve as a Public Defender for the New Haven Judicial District (c. 1977) [New Haven County, Connecticut]

== See also ==
- List of first women lawyers and judges in the United States
- Timeline of women lawyers in the United States
- Women in law

== Other topics of interest ==
- List of first minority male lawyers and judges in the United States
- List of first minority male lawyers and judges in Connecticut
