= Elgo =

Elgo may refer to:

- Yacine "Elgo" Elghorri, French illustrator
- Nina F. Elgo (born 1962), American judge
- SS Elgo, a ship wrecked in June 1940
- Elgo, a character in Final Fantasy Dimensions
- ELGO, a brand of toy building blocks
