= List of first minority male lawyers and judges in Connecticut =

This is a list of the first minority male lawyer(s) and judge(s) in Connecticut. It includes the year in which the men were admitted to practice law (in parentheses). Also included are other distinctions such as the first minority men in their state to graduate from law school or become a political figure

== Firsts in state history ==
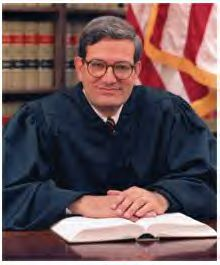
Jose A. Cabranes: First Puerto Rican male Judge of the U.S. District Court for the District of Connecticut (1979)

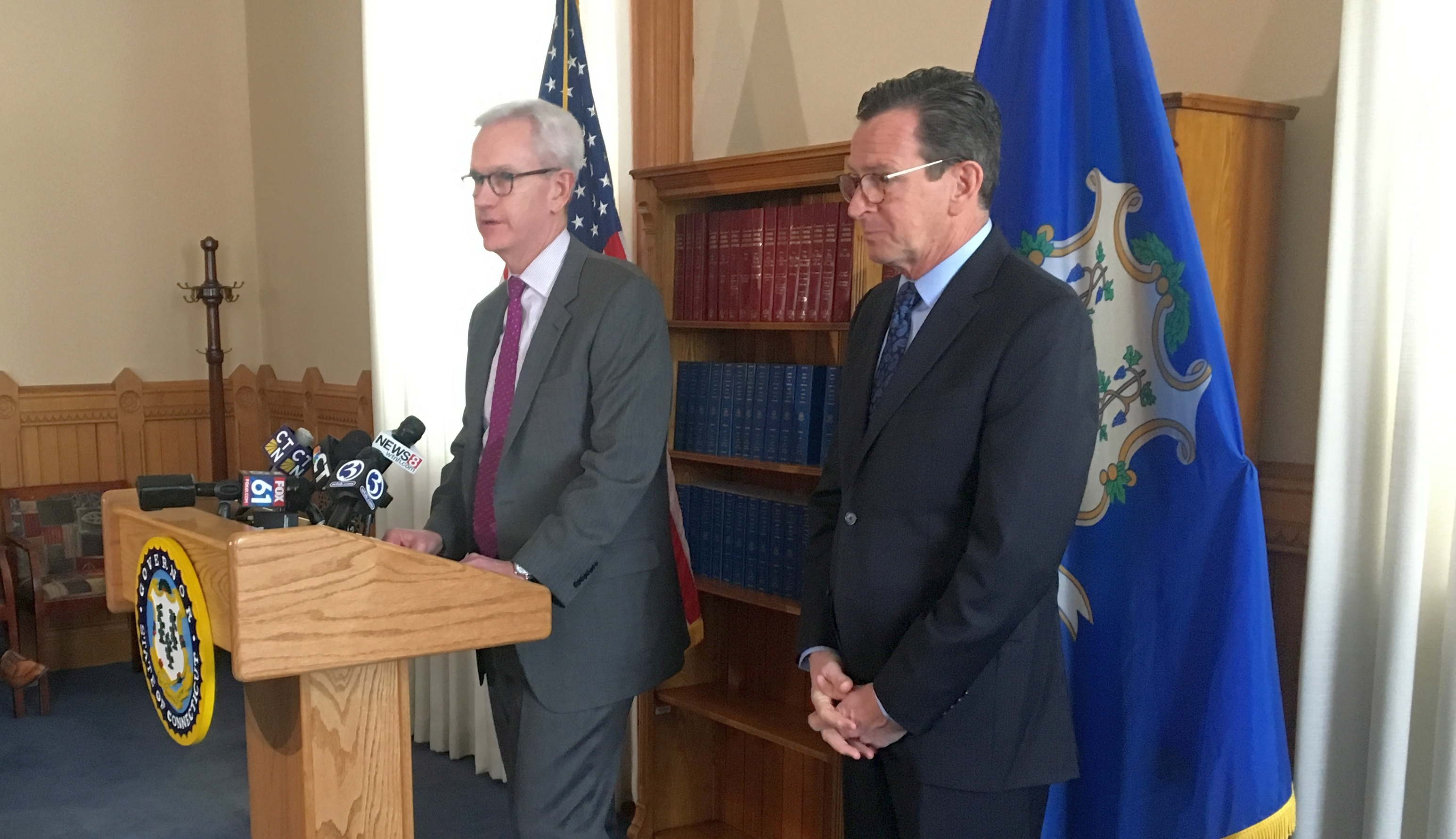
Andrew J. McDonald: First gay male appointed as Justice of the Connecticut Supreme Court (2013)

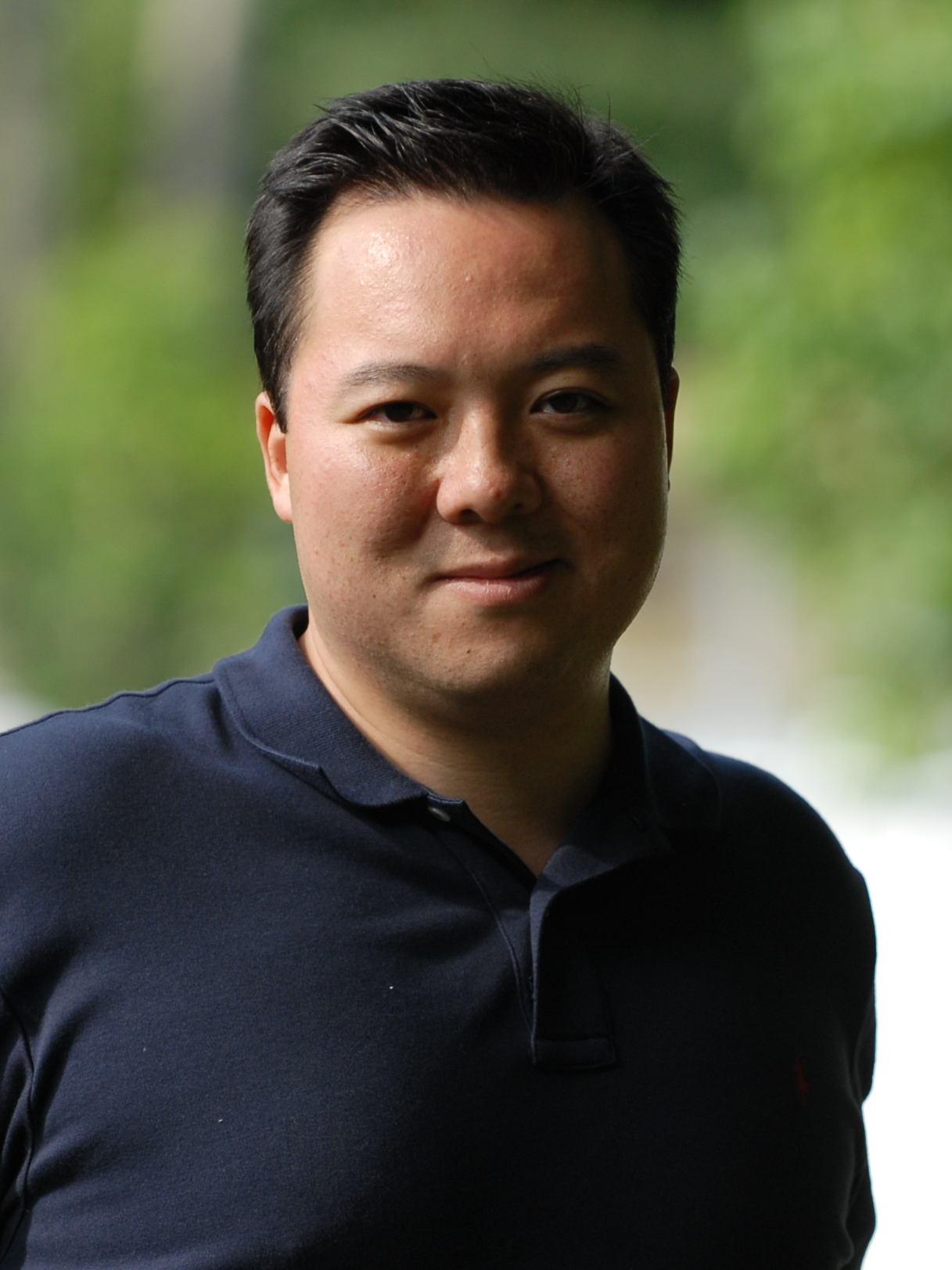
William Tong: First Asian American male Attorney General of Connecticut (2018)

=== Lawyers ===
- First Jewish American male: Morris Goodhart (1867)
- First African American male admitted to the Connecticut State Bar: Edwin Archer Randolph (1880)
- First African American to actually practice law in Connecticut: Walter J. Scott (1882)
- First Armenian American male: Andrew B. Aharonian (1928)
- First African American male (federal prosecutor): Robert D. Glass (1951) in 1966
- First to found a black law firm: John F. Merchant, Eugene Spear and L. Scott Melville (1962)
- First Latino American male: Antonio Robaina (1972)
- First Asian American male: Jackie Chan (1974)
- First Puerto Rican male: William J. Perez (c. 1981)

=== State judges ===
- First Jewish American male (judicial officer): Solomon Elsner in 1921
- First male judge of Italian descent: Edward Mascolo in 1933
- First African American male (judicial officer): Howard Drew (c. 1940s)
- First African American male (judge): Boce W. Barlow Jr. in 1957
- First Jewish American male (Connecticut Supreme Court): Samuel Mellitz in 1958
- First African American male (now-defunct Connecticut Circuit Court): John Daly in 1961
- First African American male (Connecticut Common Pleas Court): Robert L. Levister (1956) in 1974
- First African American male (Connecticut Superior Court): Robert L. Levister (1956) in 1976
- First Greek American male (Connecticut Superior Court): Socrates Mihalakos in 1985
- First African American male (Connecticut Court of Appeals): Flemming L. Norcott Jr. in 1987
- First African American male (Connecticut Supreme Court): Robert D. Glass (1951) in 1987
- First African American male (administrative judge): Eugene Spear in 1989
- First African American male (chief judge): Eugene Spear in 1991
- First Latino American male: Eddie Rodriguez in 1994
- First Muslim and South Asian male (Pakistani descent): M. (Mohammad) Nawaz Wahla in 2010
- First African American male (Family Support Magistrate): Michael Ferguson in 2011
- First openly gay male (Connecticut Supreme Court): Andrew J. McDonald (1991) in 2013
- First African American male (Chief Justice; Connecticut Supreme Court): Richard A. Robinson in 2018

=== Federal judges ===
- First Puerto Rican male (U.S. District Court for the District of Connecticut): José A. Cabranes (1965) in 1979
- First (male) public defender of color (U.S. District Court for the District of Connecticut): Omar A. Williams
- First South Asian male (U.S. Magistrate Judge; U.S. District Court for the District of Connecticut): S. Dave Vatti in 2021

=== Attorney General of Connecticut ===
- First Italian American male: Francis A. Pallotti in 1939
- First Jewish American male (to serve in a full-time capacity): Joe Lieberman in 1983
- First Asian American male: William Tong in 2018

=== Assistant Attorney General of Connecticut ===
- First Jewish American male: Joseph A. Levy in 1936
- First South Asian male: Rupal Shah Palanki in 2003

=== Assistant United States Attorney / United States Attorney ===
- First Jewish American male to serve in both capacities: George H. Cohen (c. 1934-1935)
- First African American male (U.S. District Court for the District of Connecticut): Stephen C. Robinson in 1998

=== Assistant State's Attorney ===
- First South Asian male: Proloy Das in 2002

=== Public Defender ===
- First African American male: Eugene Spear in 1978
- First South Asian male: Tejas Bhatt in 2004

=== Connecticut Bar Association ===
- First African American male (treasurer): David Bogan in 1995
- First Latino American male (treasurer): John R. Flores in 1998
- First South Asian male (president): Cecil J. Thomas in 2021

=== Political Office ===
- First African American openly LGBT male (Connecticut State Treasurer elect): Erick Russell in 2022

== Firsts in local history ==
- Henry J. Marks (1940): First Jewish male to serve as the President of the Hartford County Bar Association
- Robert Glass (1949): First African American male lawyer in Waterbury, Connecticut
- Robert L. Levister (1956): First African American male lawyer in Stamford, Connecticut
- Jackie Chan (1974): First Asian American male to serve as the President of the Danbury Bar Association, Connecticut
- Sung Ho Hwang: First Asian American male to serve as the President of the New Haven Bar Association (2012)

== See also ==
- List of first minority male lawyers and judges in the United States

== Other topics of interest ==
- List of first women lawyers and judges in the United States
- List of first women lawyers and judges in Connecticut
