= Maria Araújo Kahn =

American judge (born 1964)

Maria Kahn
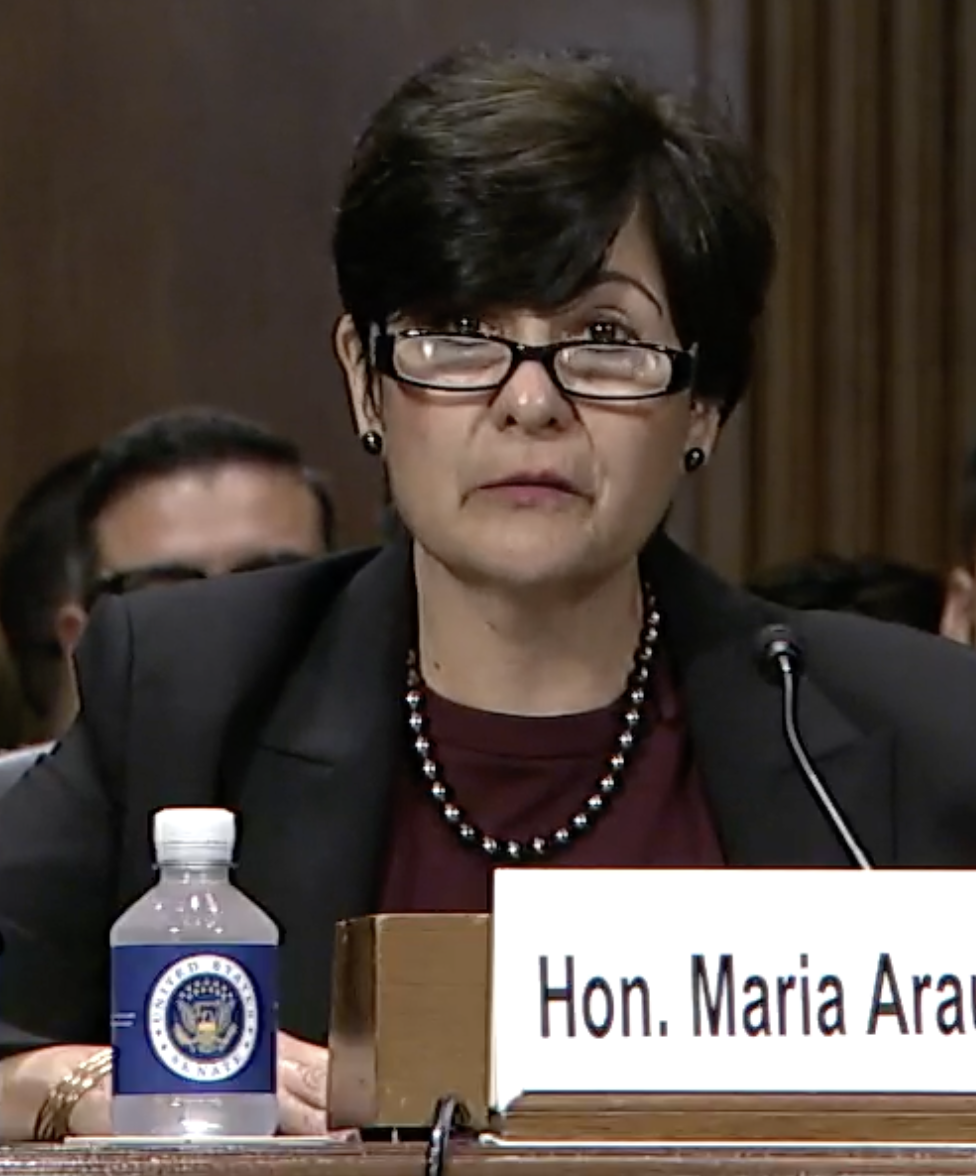

Judge of the United States Court of Appeals for the Second Circuit
- Incumbent
- Assumed office March 10, 2023
- Appointed by: Joe Biden
- Preceded by: José A. Cabranes

Associate Justice of the Connecticut Supreme Court
- In office November 1, 2017 – March 10, 2023
- Appointed by: Dan Malloy
- Preceded by: Carmen E. Espinosa
- Succeeded by: Nora Dannehy

Personal details
- Born: Maria José Violante Dias Araújo; August 20, 1964 (age 62) Benguela, Angola
- Education: New York University (BA); Fordham University (JD)

Maria Araújo Kahn (née Araújo; born August 20, 1964) is an American lawyer who is serving as a United States circuit judge of the United States Court of Appeals for the Second Circuit. She previously served as an associate justice of the Connecticut Supreme Court from 2017 to 2023.

== Early life and education ==
Kahn was born in 1964 in Benguela, Angola, to Portuguese parents. She immigrated to the United States when she was ten years old and speaks fluent Portuguese and Spanish. She earned a Bachelor of Arts degree from New York University in 1986 and her Juris Doctor from the Fordham University School of Law in 1989.

== Career ==
Kahn clerked for Judge Peter Collins Dorsey of the United States District Court for the District of Connecticut from 1989 to 1991 before serving as a public defender for the State of Connecticut from 1991 to 1993. From 1993 to 1997, Kahn was a staff attorney at the Connecticut Office of Protection and Advocacy for Individuals with Disabilities. She then served as an Assistant United States Attorney prosecuting medical fraud, computer fraud, and white collar criminal cases from 1997 to 2006. She was also an adjunct professor at the University of Connecticut School of Law.

=== Connecticut Superior Court ===
Kahn was appointed by Jodi Rell to the New Haven County Superior Court in April 2006, serving until she was appointed by Dan Malloy to the Connecticut Appellate Court in January 2017.

=== Consideration for federal district court ===
In February 2013, Kahn was named as one of five finalists being considered for nomination to a seat on the United States District Court for the District of Connecticut left vacant when Judge Mark R. Kravitz died in September 2012.

=== Connecticut Appellate Court ===
On May 2, 2017, Governor Dannel Malloy nominated Kahn to the Connecticut Appellate Court. Her appointment and confirmation created a female majority on the court.

=== Connecticut Supreme Court ===
On October 4, 2017, Governor Malloy nominated Kahn to the Connecticut Supreme Court. She was confirmed and sworn into office on November 1, 2017.

=== Federal judicial service ===
On July 29, 2022, President Joe Biden announced his intent to nominate Kahn to serve as a United States circuit judge for the United States Court of Appeals for the Second Circuit. On August 1, 2022, her nomination was sent to the Senate. President Biden nominated Kahn to the seat that was vacated by Judge José A. Cabranes, who announced his intent to assume senior status upon confirmation of a successor. On September 21, 2022, a hearing on her nomination was held before the Senate Judiciary Committee. On December 1, 2022, her nomination was favorably reported by the committee by a 12–10 vote. On January 3, 2023, her nomination was returned to the President under Rule XXXI, Paragraph 6 of the United States Senate; she was renominated later the same day. On February 2, 2023, her nomination was favorably reported by the committee by an 11–9 vote. On February 13, 2023, Majority Leader Chuck Schumer filed cloture on her nomination. On February 16, 2023, the Senate invoked cloture on her nomination by a 50–44 vote. On March 9, 2023, her nomination was confirmed by a 51–42 vote. She received her judicial commission on March 10, 2023.

== See also ==
- List of Portuguese Americans

Legal offices
Preceded by Carmen E. Espinosa	Associate Justice of the Connecticut Supreme Court; 2017–2023	Succeeded by Nora Dannehy
Preceded by José A. Cabranes	Judge of the United States Court of Appeals for the Second Circuit; 2023–present	Incumbent
