= William Henry Richmond =

American coal mine operator (1821–1922)

William Henry Richmond as he appeared in the National Cyclopaedia of American Biography in 1899.

William Henry Richmond (1821-1922) was an American coal mine operator. He is reckoned as one of the key actors in the expansion of the Lackawanna Coal Mine district of Scranton, Pennsylvania, during the second half of the 19th Century. Richmond is best remembered today as the namesake of Richmond Memorial Library in Marlborough, Connecticut.

== Biography ==
=== Early years ===
Richmond was born October 23, 1821, at Marlborough, Hartford County, Connecticut. His father, William Wadsworth Richmond, claimed family roots dating back to 11th Century Brittany and an American forefather who was one of the members of Plymouth Colony that launched Taunton, Massachusetts, in 1637. Another of Richmond's ancestors, William Wadsworth, was an immigrant to the Massachusetts Bay Colony from England in 1632 and a founder of the Colony of Connecticut a few years later.

Richmond's father worked as a blacksmith, with his shop working in conjunction with a Marlborough factory that produced wagons, window blinds, and other fabricated goods. His father later expanded his operation with another Marlborough blacksmith, establishing a foundry under the business name Richmond and Kellogg.

One of five children, Richmond attended public school in Connecticut until the age of 13, at which time he left home to take a job. With the coming of the massive economic crisis known as the Panic of 1837 this decision was soon reversed, however, and the 15-year-old Richmond returned home to work on the home farm and in his father's shop, also re-enrolling in school to continue his studies.

=== Career ===
William Henry Richmond in 1903.

In 1842 Richmond left home again, this time to take a job in a store in Honesdale, Pennsylvania. He remained there for three years before moving to the nearby Northeastern Pennsylvania town of Carbondale, where he opened a store of his own as part of a partnership called Richmond & Robinson. Originally a general merchandise store, the Richmond & Robinson firm brought in some of the first woodworking machinery into the Lackawanna and Wyoming Valleys and began manufacturing doors, coal cars, and other wooden products in 1851. This new activity proved successful and Richmond bought out his partner to become a sole proprietor in 1853.

A fire in September 1855 destroyed Richmond's store building, but he was able to have it rebuilt by the next year.

Richmond was married in 1847 to Lois Roxanna Morss and together they raised three daughters, all of whom attended and graduated from Vassar College. Two other children died in early childhood.

Richmond began his career as a mine operator in January 1860 when he launched Richmond & Co. in partnership with a former official of the when he opened a coal mine in partnership with a former top official of the Delaware and Hudson Canal Company. A mine was opened near the neighboring town of Blakely. The enterprise proved successful and in 1861 Richmond sold his Carbondale wood manufacturing operation to concentrate full-time on the coal industry. Richmond & Co. subsequently opened the first coal breaking facility in the area, processing and finishing coal for the market.

Richmond & Co. was absorbed into the Elk Hill Coal and Iron Company in 1863, with Richmond eventually emerging as president, chief stockholder, and general manager of the operation. Coal breaking remained a specialty, and in 1889 construction was begun on a new facility at Dickson City, closer to mining operations. By 1891 Richmond's colliery was able to process and ship 1,000 tons of coal per day. The Lackawanna and Wyoming valleys as a whole saw their total production of anthracite coal explode from barely over 200,000 tons per year in the middle 1840s to about 26,000,000 tons per year in 1897. Richmond became very wealthy in the process.

As the 19th century came to a close, Richmond's Elk Hill Coal and Iron operated two coal mines in Lackawanna County with an annual output of between 400,000 and 500,000 tons per year, a third colliery at Dickson City, and a fourth constructed in 1893 about 5 miles north of Carbondale.

Richmond took pride in the economic role played by him and his peers and felt himself the victim of unfair vilification at the hands of journalists and the public. In a 1903 speech to citizens of the town of his birth, Richmond declared:

"The price of oak and hickory wood used to be $6 to $7 a cord on dock at Middle Haddam, and by the time it was placed before the door of the New Yorker, and sawed and split to proper sizes to use, it cost him $12 or more per cord, and it is counted as taking two cords, or 256 cubic feet, of wood to supply the number of heat units of a ton of anthracite coal. Notwithstanding, now when the people of New York and elsewhere can have a ton of anthracite coal put in their coalbins for $5 or $6, they, through the newspapers, abuse the hardworking coal operators and producers, who expend large amounts of money in opening coal mines, building coal breakers and railroads to produce the coal, and call them by the euphonious name 'Coal Barons.'"

Richmond financed the launch of other business enterprises during his life, including the Crystal Lake Water Company and in 1867 the Carbondale Gas Company. He was also an original stockholder and director of the Third National Bank.

=== Later years ===
In matters of religion, Richmond was an active member of the Presbyterian Church from 1842. He was treasurer of the Lackawanna Bible Society for three decades and was a member of the American Bible Society.

Politically, Richmond supported the Republican Party until the middle of the 1890s, at which time he switched his allegiance to the Prohibition Party. Richmond was a Prohibition Party candidate for United States Congress in 1904. In 1908 he appeared on the ballot as a Presidential elector on behalf of Prohibition Party nominee Eugene W. Chafin.

In 1874 Richmond moved to a 75-acre farm outside of Scranton, Pennsylvania, where as a hobby he began raising Jersey cows. He sold the bulk of his herd in 1886, keeping 10 animals for household use. A son-in-law who was an attorney was made a vice president of Elk Valley Coal and Iron, and he and Richmond's daughter and their five children shared Richmond's home during his later years.

=== Death and legacy ===
Richmond died March 14, 1922, at the age of 101.

Richmond is remembered today as the namesake of Richmond Memorial Library in Marlborough, Connecticut.

== Works ==
- "Address by Hon. William H. Richmond of Scranton, Pa.," in Mary Hall, Report of the Celebration of the Centennial of the Incorporation of the Town of Marlborough: August 23d and 25th, 1903. Hartford: Case, Lockwood & Brainard Company, 1904; pp. 80–86.
- "Recollections of Ninety-Five Years in Connecticut and the Anthracite Region of Pennsylvania," Journal of American History, vol. 11, no. 3 (1917) pp. 424–444.
