= Boce W. Barlow Jr. =

American politician (1915–2005)

Personal details
- Born: Boce William Barlow Jr. August 8, 1915 Americus, Georgia, U.S.
- Died: January 31, 2005 (aged 89)
- Party: Democratic
- Education: Hartford High School; Howard University; Harvard University
- Occupation: Politician, judge
- Known for: First African-American judge in Connecticut; First African American elected to the Connecticut State Senate

Military service
- Allegiance: United States
- Battles/wars: World War II

Boce William Barlow Jr. (August 8, 1915 – January 31, 2005) was first African-American judge in Connecticut, in 1957, and the first African-American to be elected to the Connecticut State Senate in 1966.

Born in Americus, Georgia, in 1915, Barlow came to Hartford with his parents when he was one year old, attended Hartford High School, and graduated from Howard University in 1939 as class president. After serving in World War II in a segregated unit, he graduated from Harvard Law School, one of only four African Americans in his class. Like his father before him, he was active in Democratic Party politics, and won election to the state senate in 1966, serving two terms. Barlow continued to distinguish himself, serving in a variety of state posts that advanced the cause of equal rights.

== See also ==
- Boce W. Barlow Jr. House
- List of African-American jurists
- List of first minority male lawyers and judges in Connecticut
