= Bessye Anita Warren Bennett =

American lawyer

Bessye Anita Warren Bennett (1938–2000) was Connecticut's first African American female lawyer.

She was born on August 16, 1938, in Prairie View, Texas to educators Dr. Samuel Enders Warren and Juanita McBroom. Bennett graduated from Radcliffe College in Boston, Massachusetts in 1954, and married John Bennett (a Harvard University student at the time) shortly thereafter. By 1964, the couple eventually settled with their children in Hartford, Connecticut. Since she was working as an educator, Bennett earned a master's degree in education at Trinity College.

Bennett went on to graduate from University of Connecticut School of Law in 1973, and in the following year, Bennett was admitted as the first African American female to practice law in Connecticut. She worked as a corporate attorney (the first African American female to do so) before establishing her own practice in 1985. She achieved yet another historical first when she served as the Deputy Town Counsel for Bloomfield, Connecticut.

She died on May 16, 2000, in Hartford.

== See also ==
- List of first women lawyers and judges in Connecticut
