= Marlborough, Connecticut =

- Town
- Town of Marlborough
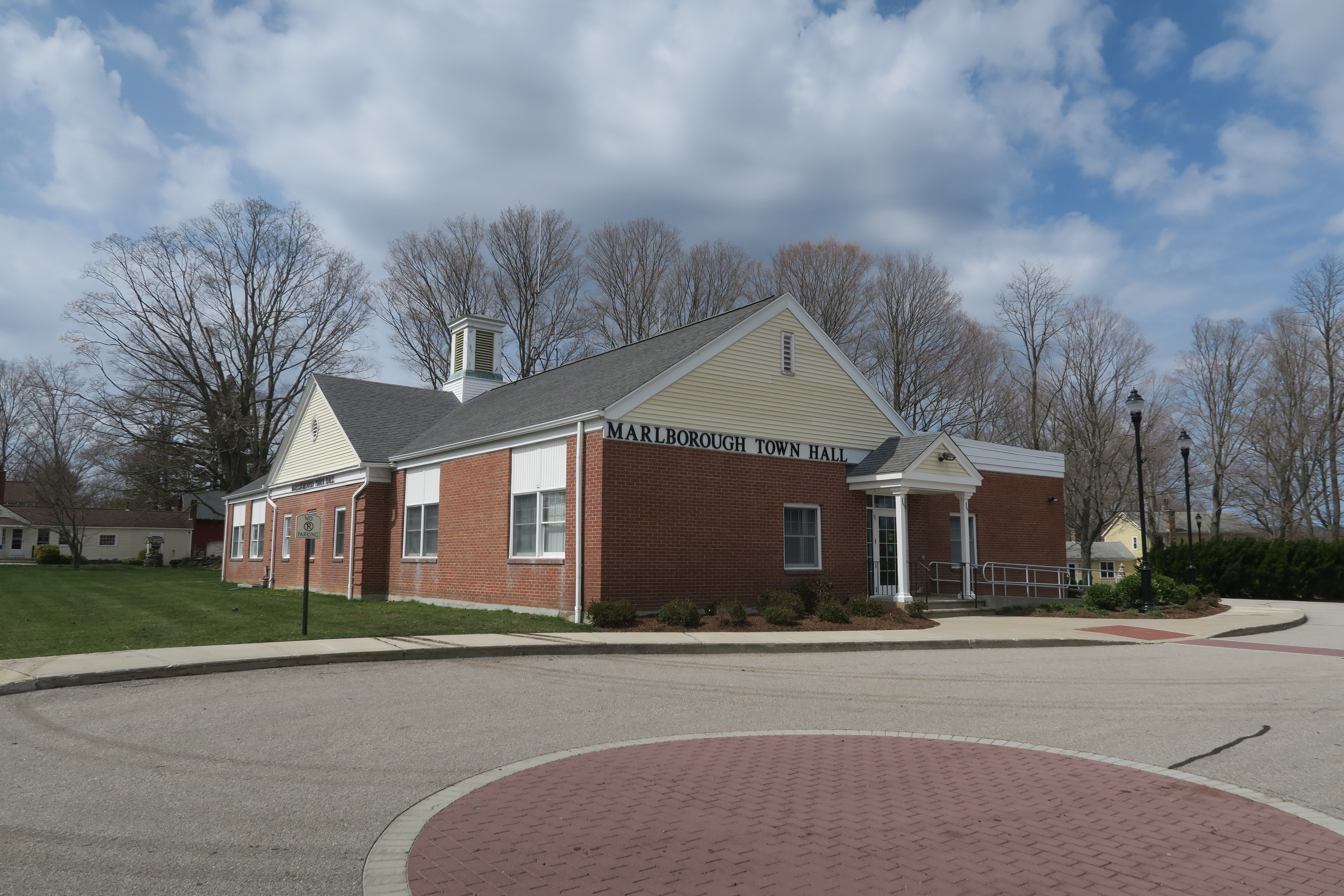
- Town Hall

- Flag Seal
- Interactive map of Marlborough, Connecticut
- Coordinates: 41°38′07″N 72°29′14″W
- Country: United States
- U.S. state: Connecticut
- County: Hartford
- Region: Capitol Region
- Incorporated: 1803

Government
  - Type: Selectman-town meeting
  - Selectman: Louise Concodello (R)
  - Selectman: Joseph J. Asklar (R)
  - Selectman: Anthony Bratz (D)
  - Selectman: Susan McFarland (D)
  - Selectman: John Rizza (D)
  - Town Manager: David Porter

Area
  - Total: 23.5 sq mi (61 km^{2})
  - Land: 23.4 sq mi (60.5 km^{2})
  - Water: 0.15 sq mi (0.4 km^{2})
- Elevation: 538 ft (164 m)

Population (2020)
  - Total: 6,133
  - Density: 263/sq mi (101/km^{2})
- Time zone: UTC-5 (Eastern)
  - Summer (DST): UTC-4 (Eastern)
- ZIP Code: 06447
- Area codes: 860/959
- FIPS code: 09-45820
- GNIS feature ID: 0213457
- Website: marlboroughct.net

Marlborough is a town in Hartford County, Connecticut, United States. It contains the census-designated place (CDP) of Terramuggus. The town is part of the Capitol Planning Region. The town's population was 6,133 at the 2020 census. Marlborough is a suburban and rural community. The local high school is RHAM High School. In 2013, Marlborough ranked third (of 24) in Connecticut Magazine's biannual ranking of Connecticut small towns. Educationally, RHAM High School, which serves Marlborough, Hebron, and Andover students, is one of the top-ranked regional high schools in the state on the SAT in 2017, and 11th highest-performing school in the state on the test. The town is home to Elmer Theines-Mary Hall elementary school which serves Pre-K through 6th grade. The school scores above state average on standardized testing and student progress.

== History ==
The earliest inhabitants of present-day Marlborough, prior to the arrival of the English settlers, were the Podunk people, an indigenous people who spoke an Algonquian language. The town's origins can be traced back to 1648, when (John) Sadler's Ordinary, a rest stop from the colonical era, was established. This establishment, the second of its kind in Connecticut Colony after Hartford, served as a crossroads during colonial times. Travelers would stop to rest at the Buell House (now the Marlborough Tavern) located at the heart of what is now Marlborough center. Although the original Sadler's Ordinary (Inn) eventually went out of business, a new Sadler's Ordinary was built in a new location in 1970 and continues to operate today.

In 1747, William Buell and Joel Foote petitioned the colonial General Court for permission to form an Ecclesiastical Society and establish the town of Marlborough. In 1749, they began constructing the First Congregational Church which was not completed until 1803. On October 13, 1803, Marlborough was officially incorporated, encompassing land from portions of three neighboring towns: Glastonbury, Colchester (New London County) and Hebron (Tolland County). The town took its name from Marlborough, Massachusetts, which was named after Marlborough, Wiltshire in England.

By 1907 the town had a population of fewer than 305 residents. It wasn’t until the 1960s that Marlborough was rediscovered as a bedroom community for white-collar professionals working in Hartford. A comprehensive history of the town titled Reflections Into Marlborough's History was published in 2007.

== Geography ==
According to the United States Census Bureau, the town has a total area of 23.5 square miles (60.9 km^{2}), of which 23.4 square miles (60.5 km^{2}) is land and 0.15 square miles (0.4 km^{2}), or 0.73%, is water. Marlborough is adjacent to four other Connecticut towns (Glastonbury to the north, East Hampton to the west, Colchester to the south, and Hebron to the east). East Hampton, Colchester and Hebron are each in different counties from each other and from Marlborough.

Route 2, a two-lane highway (sometimes three) in most sections, bisects the town, and there are three Marlborough exits, at South Main Street, Route 66, and West Road, although there are exits westbound only for South Main and eastbound only for West Road. It takes approximately 15– 20 minutes to get to Hartford, 40 minutes to New London, 45 minutes to New Haven, and 40 minutes to Springfield, MA. Marlborough is generally equidistant between Boston and New York. Boston is an hour and 45 minutes away, while New York City is a two-hour car ride, pending traffic conditions. Popular vacation areas are also reasonable drives from Marlborough. The Berkshire Mountains are an hour and 20 minutes away, and popular Rhode Island beaches, depending on which one you go to, are an hour (Misquamicut, Westerly) to an hour and 20 minutes away (Narragansett).

== Demographics ==
Historical population
Census	Pop.	Note	%±
1820	1,954		—
1850	832		—
1860	682		−18.0%
1870	476		−30.2%
1880	391		−17.9%
1890	582		48.8%
1900	322		−44.7%
1910	302		−6.2%
1920	303		0.3%
1930	319		5.3%
1940	476		49.2%
1950	901		89.3%
1960	1,961		117.6%
1970	2,991		52.5%
1980	4,746		58.7%
1990	5,535		16.6%
2000	5,709		3.1%
2010	6,404		12.2%
2020	6,133		−4.2%
U.S. Decennial Census

As of the census of 2010, there were 6,404 people, 2,292 households, and 1,820 families residing in the town. As of the 2000 census, the population density was 245.2 inhabitants per square mile (94.7/km^{2}). There were 2,057 housing units at an average density of 88.4 per square mile (34.1/km^{2}). The racial makeup of the town was 65.3% White, 1.3% African American, 30.1% Native American, 1.6% Asian, 0.2% from other races, and 1.4% from two or more races. Hispanic or Latino of any race were 2.8% of the population.

There were 2,292 households, out of which 36.9% had children under the age of 18 living with them, 68.9% were married couples living together, 7.5% had a female householder with no husband present, and 20.6% were non-families. 15.8% of all households were made up of individuals, and 5.8% had someone living alone who was 65 years of age or older. The average household size was 2.75 and the average family size was 3.09.

In the town, the population was spread out, with 27.4% under the age of 18, 3.4% from 20 to 24, 22.7% from 25 to 44, 34.1% from 45 to 64, and 12.5% who were 65 years of age or older. The median age was 43 years.

The median income for a household in the town was $139,255 and the median income for a family was $159,376. Males had a median income of $98,789 versus $64,959 for females. The per capita income for the town was $58,805. About 0.3% of families and 1.0% of the population were below the poverty line, including none of those under age 18 and 0.5% of those age 65 or over.

== Government and politics ==
Voter Registration and Party Enrollment as of October 27, 2020
Party	Active Voters	Inactive Voters	Total Voters	Percentage
Democratic	1,410	106	1,516	30.64%
Republican	1,248	83	1,331	26.91%
Unaffiliated	1,874	114	1,988	40.19%
Minor Parties	106	6	112	2.26%
Total	4,638	309	4,947	100%

Marlborough town vote by party in presidential elections
Year	Democratic	Republican	Third Parties
2020	52.2% 2,119	45.8% 1,861	2.0% 79
2016	46.36% 1,687	48.53% 1,766	5.11% 186
2012	51.04% 1,791	47.53% 1,668	1.43% 50
2008	55.93% 2,071	43.05% 1,594	1.03% 38
2004	50.96% 1,850	47.11% 1,710	1.93% 70
2000	50.99% 1,654	43.50% 1,411	5.52% 179
1996	48.25% 1,379	35.93% 1,027	15.82% 452
1992	37.02% 1,187	33.00% 1,058	29.98% 961
1988	44.61% 1,230	54.15% 1,493	1.23% 34
1984	32.84% 825	66.88% 1,680	0.28% 7
1980	32.66% 771	47.18% 1,114	20.16% 476
1976	43.48% 850	56.01% 1,095	0.51% 10
1972	36.41% 603	62.68% 1,038	0.91% 15
1968	43.27% 469	49.45% 536	7.29% 79
1964	65.35% 594	34.65% 315	0.00% 0
1960	45.29% 409	54.71% 494	0.00% 0
1956	33.15% 243	66.85% 490	0.00% 0

== Notable people ==
- Larry Boardman (born 1936), boxer born in Marlborough
- Chris Cillizza (born 1976), journalist born in Marlborough
- Mary Hall (1843–1927), suffragist, first female lawyer in Connecticut, born in Marlborough
- A.J. Pollock (born 1987), Major League Baseball player with the Arizona Diamondbacks; born in Marlborough, attended RHAM High School in Hebron, CT
- William Henry Richmond (1821–1922), anthracite coal mine operator born in Marlborough
- Gretchen Ulion (born 1972), 1998 Winter Olympics ice hockey gold medalist

== Points of interest ==
- Marlborough Congregational Church, placed on the National Register of Historic Places in 1993
- Marlborough Arts Center – A non-profit regional arts center housed in the restored Charles W. Hall building
- Marlborough Tavern
