= Boce W. Barlow Jr. House =

Historic house in Connecticut, United States

- U.S. National Register of Historic Places
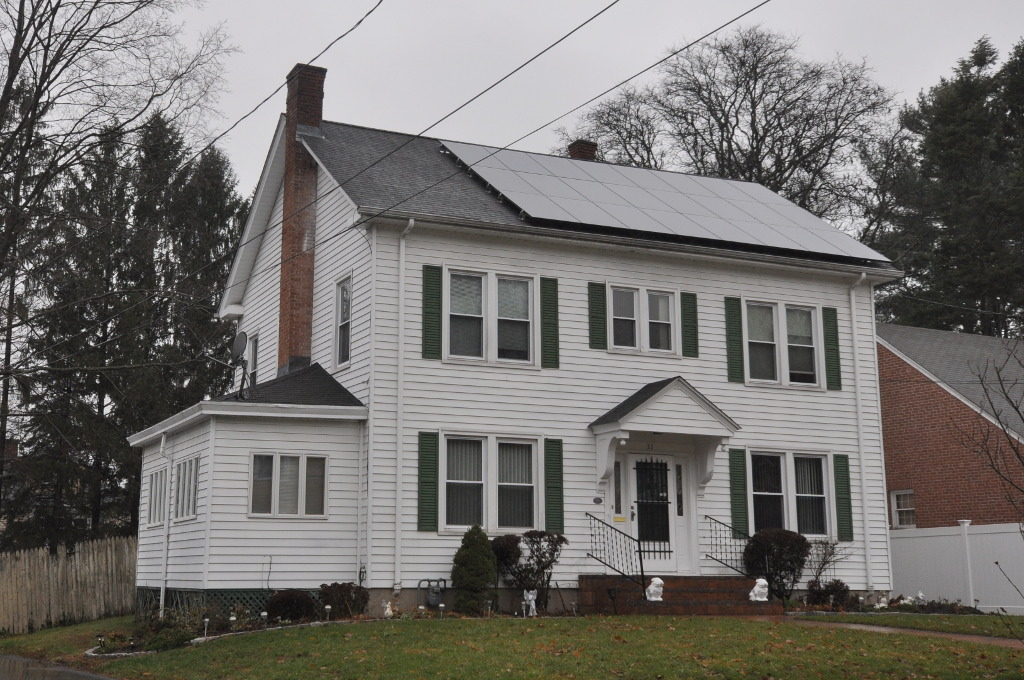

- Location within Connecticut Location within the United States
- Location: 31 Canterbury Street, Hartford, Connecticut
- Coordinates: 41°47′19″N 72°41′53″W
- Area: less than one acre
- Architectural style: Colonial Revival
- NRHP reference No.: 94000767
- Added to NRHP: July 31, 1994

The Boce W. Barlow Jr. House is a historic house at 31 Canterbury Street in Hartford, Connecticut. An architecturally undistinguished two-story built in 1926, it was from 1958 home to Boce W. Barlow Jr. (1915–2005), the first African-American to win election to the Connecticut State Senate, and a prominent figure in Hartford politics. The house was listed on the National Register of Historic Places in 1994.

== Description and history ==
The Boce W. Barlow Jr. House is located in Hartford's northernmost Blue Hills neighborhood, on the west side of Canterbury Street north of Westbourne Parkway. It is one of a number of similar homes on the street, which was subdivided and built out in the 1920s. It is a two-story wood-frame structure, with a side gable roof, clapboarded exterior, and two brick chimneys, one at the left side and one in the interior behind the roof ridge. The main facade is three bays wide, with the outer bays filled by paired sash windows. The main entrance is at the center, sheltered by a bracketed gable-roofed hood. A smaller pair of sash windows are set above the entrance.

The house was built in 1926, and was purchased in 1958 by Boce Barlow Jr. Born in Georgia, Barlow came to Hartford with his parents when he was one year old, attended Hartford High School, and graduated from Howard University in 1939 as class president. After serving in World War II in a segregated unit, he graduated from Harvard Law School, one of only four African-Americans in his class. Like his father before him, he was active in Democratic Party politics, and won election to the state senate in 1966, serving two terms. When he moved into this house in 1958 with his wife and children, they were the first African-Americans on the block, and were subjected to harassment and prejudicial behavior. Barlow continued to distinguish himself, serving in a variety of state posts that advanced the cause of equal rights. The city named a street in his honor in 1987.

== See also ==
- National Register of Historic Places listings in Hartford, Connecticut
