= Marlborough Congregational Church =

Historic church in Connecticut, United States

- U.S. National Register of Historic Places
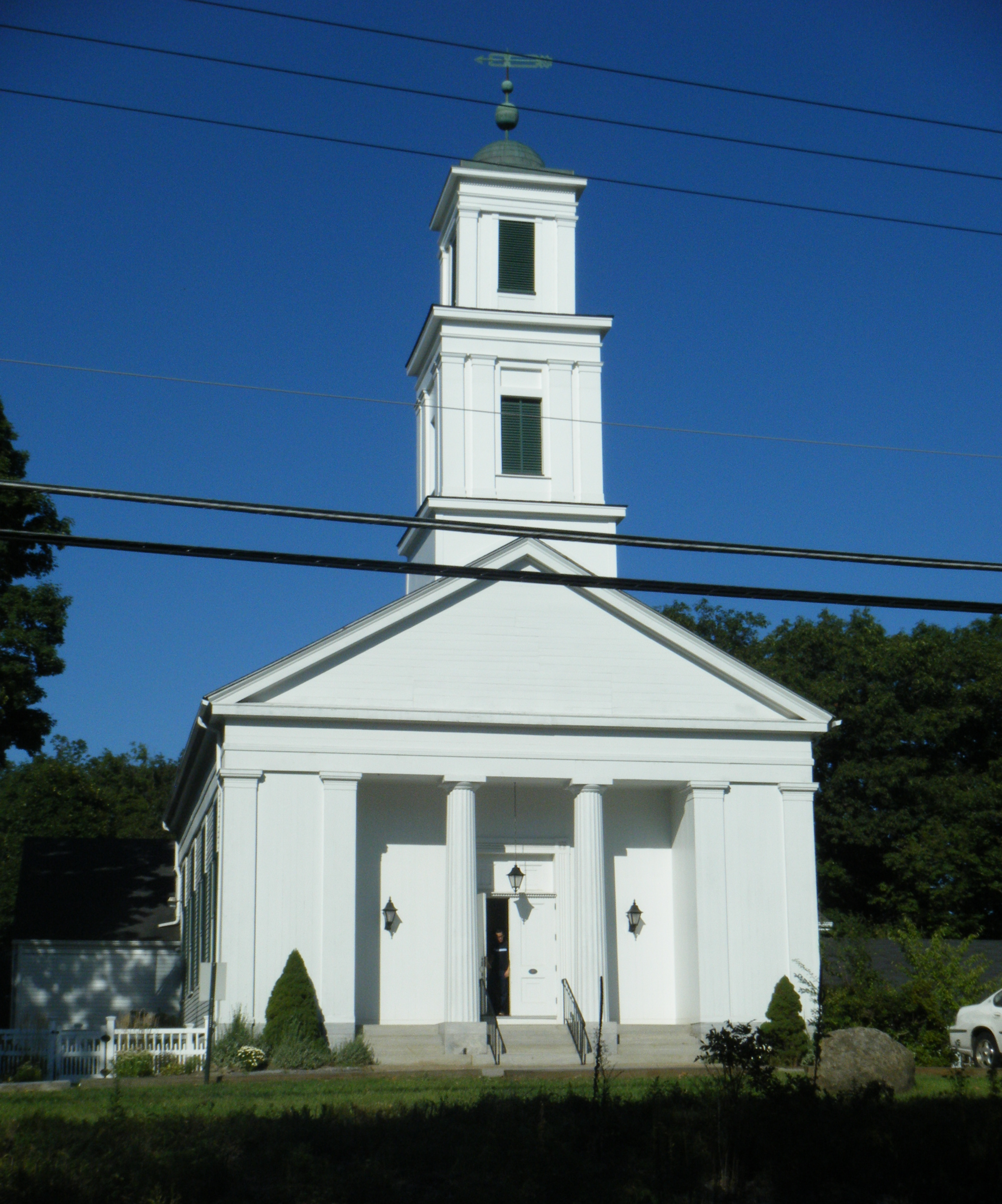

- Location within Connecticut Location within the United States
- Location: 35 South Main Street, Marlborough, Connecticut
- Coordinates: 41°37′44″N 72°27′19″W
- Area: 1.9 acres (0.77 ha)
- Built: 1842
- Architect: Truedale, Augustus
- Architectural style: Colonial Revival
- NRHP reference No.: 93001346
- Added to NRHP: December 10, 1993

The Marlborough Congregational Church is a historic Congregational Church at 35 South Main Street in Marlborough, Connecticut. Built in 1842, it is a well-preserved example Greek Revival architecture. In addition hosting religious services, it also hosted town meetings for many years. It was listed on the National Register of Historic Places in 1993.

== Description and history ==
The Marlborough Congregational Church stands near the southern fringe of the village center of Marlborough, at the junction of South Main Street and Johnson Road. Set on a rise facing north, it is a single-story wood-frame structure, with a gabled roof. Its main facade has a recessed central area, in which a wide double door provides entrance to the building. This is set behind a pair of fluted Doric columns, and the recess is framed by pilasters at either end, as are the corners of the building. The pilasters and pillars support a simple entablature that extends along the sides of the building, above which is a fully pedimented gable pediment. A three-stage square tower rises above the entrance, the upper two stages with louvered centers and corner pilasters, with a shallow dome and weathervane at the top.

The town of Marlborough was incorporated in 1803 from territory taken from surrounding towns. Its congregational society was established in 1747, with the construction of a meetinghouse. By the 1830s, that building was too small for the congregation, and the present building was constructed in 1842 with funds raised by subscription. Although Connecticut had formally required separation of church and civic functions in 1818, the church continued to be used for local town meetings into the 20th century, because it was the only building in the small community with large enough seating capacity. In addition to hosting religious services, the building has been the site of community meetings and social events.

== See also ==
- National Register of Historic Places listings in Hartford County, Connecticut
