= Howard Drew =

American sprinter (1890–1957)

Howard Porter Drew (June 28, 1890 – February 19, 1957) was an American track and field athlete who competed in the 1912 Summer Olympics.

An inspirational African-American athlete, Drew was once considered the "world’s fastest man", known as the first great black sprinter, and went from being an Olympic track athlete to serving in World War I to becoming a judge in Hartford, Connecticut, later in life.

== Early life ==
Born in Lexington, Virginia, Howard Drew and his family settled in Springfield, Massachusetts, in 1904. His father was a Baptist minister, and both parents agreed they did not want to raise Howard in the Jim Crow south.

A graduate from Springfield (Central) High School, Drew showed exceptional athletic abilities even upon entering high school. Known for winning track meets—regardless of sporting apparel—he soon became recognized nationally, later setting world records in the 50, 100 and 220 yard dash. In his early years in high school it was said that he often raced the horses going to a fire, since few men in the area would compete with him (Davis-Harris).

This all took place during high school. Drew scored more points individually than entire high school teams during track meets, and he had already tied world records at the midpoint of his high school athletic career. He is known for winning his first two races in high school (age 15) wearing his own shorts that he made and, on top of this, he won one race barefooted and one race wearing what would today be called cleats. But for him, these cleats were his own creation of inserting nails into his track shoes and cushioning this with leather.

Drew impressed everyone by winning the first 100-yard dash with these cleats, and the next 440-yard dash on cinder track without anything on his feet at the Fourth of July “Springfield City Games” that year (AAR).

== Life and legacy ==
=== Athletic career ===
Drew's multi-faceted life served as a powerful model for young black men, especially considering the bravery and fortitude he exemplified during his time of maturity. Drew's career began as someone who dropped out of high school to support this family, only to return in 1910 (age 20) to begin setting track records and dominating both baseball and football opponents. He was a star football athlete, playing running back on the Springfield Football Team made up of players from all high schools in Springfield. He, alongside Bertram Smith and Hobart Johnson, were the starts in the years of 1907–1910 (Davis-Harris).

Drew won the Harvard Stadium Olympic qualifiers and went on to win the US Trials in Michigan through the personal support of Jack Sullivan, current head of the National AAU, as well as donations received from the Springfield newspapers bringing Drew's name to fame. He set the world record at the time for the 100yd dash, as he cruised past one of the fastest Americans at the time, Ralph Craig. Ongoing support, even from the Mayor of Boston, enabled Drew to go to Sweden for the 1912 Stockholm Olympics. Here he won the initial races but threw out one of his legs while stepping on a soft spot on the track as he still won first place in the 100m semi-final. Nevertheless, Drew didn't have the fastest time at Stockholm - healthy or not - that went to D.F. Lippincott who ran 10.6 for the Olympic record in a heat which lasted until 1932. Lippincott finished second to Ralph Craig in the 100 final. The next year Lippincott tied Drew's 100 yard record of 9.6.

While at USC (1913–1916) Drew tied or set the world records (ranging from 30 to 250 yd dashes) and was called by journalists "the fastest man in the world" as well as "Crack Colored Sprinter" and "Negro Dash Man". Drew did not qualify for the 1920 Olympics.

=== Education, enlisting in the U.S. Army ===
Drew had always striven to be a strong student academically and athletically. He frequently wrote as a journalist for the local newspaper, and he received all A's on average during his college years at USC. Later doing graduate studies at Drake University, he blended his abilities, serving as a motivational speaker and track coach for university students.

Around this time it is noted that in 1915 he was captured in the “Education Number” special of the NAACP's The Crisis, and also met Booker T. Washington—which was one of the signifying moments in defining the status of Howard Porter Drew (Coach Larry—see pdf below).

Through it all, Drew never let go of his intellectual abilities, despite taking time off to enlist in World War I. He later became the Victory Medal award-winning sergeant for the Supply Company, 809th Pioneer Infantry Regiment, and the 88th Division of the U.S. Army. He coached Army track teams while in France and was Honorably Discharged in 1919—receiving the Victory Medal and a defensive bar for his actions and service.

== Later years ==
Having been honorably discharged, he worked tirelessly to take advantage of this time to pass the bar exam in 1920 in Connecticut. He soon moved to Hartford to become one of four black attorneys at the time. He married Dora Helen Newcomb. They welcomed Howard Jr. and Jean into their lives shortly after. His reputation in Hartford grew as he was both assistant clerk and a judge. He had been the Justice of the Peace in the 1940s, setting records as the first Black man in Connecticut to do such things. During World War II he served on the local draft board.

Drew died at the U.S. Veterans Hospital in West Haven, Connecticut (Black Past), and he now rests just north of Hartford, near where he raised his family.

== See also ==
- List of first minority male lawyers and judges in Connecticut
