= Marlborough Tavern =

- U.S. National Register of Historic Places
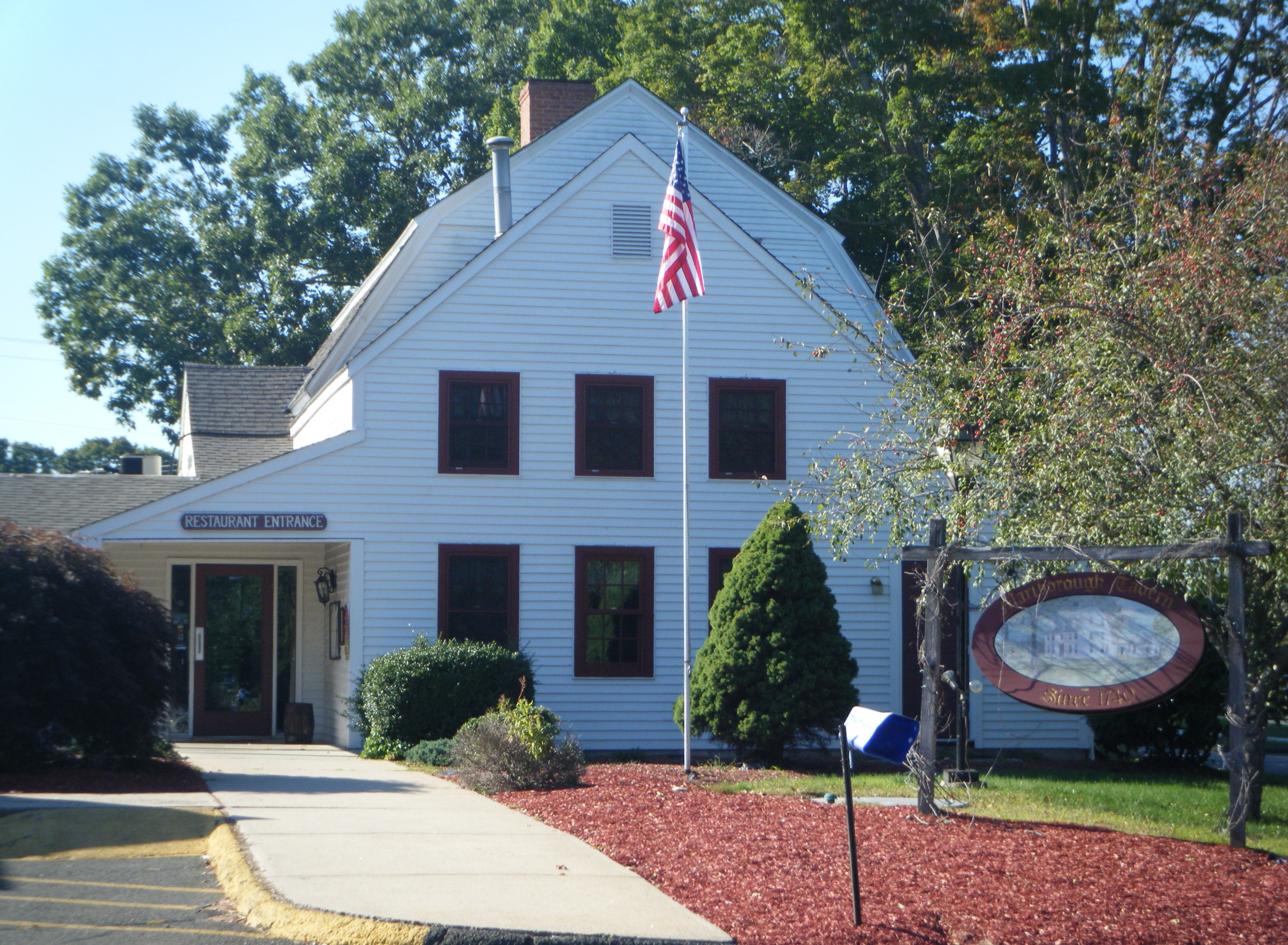
- Tavern in 2010

- Location within Connecticut Location within the United States
- Location: East Hampton Road and South Main Street, Marlborough, Connecticut
- Coordinates: 41°37′52″N 72°27′35″W
- Area: 5 acres (2.0 ha)
- Built: 1760
- Architectural style: Colonial
- NRHP reference No.: 78002866
- Added to NRHP: December 6, 1978

The Marlborough Tavern, also known historically as the Col. Elisha Buell House, is a historic house and former tavern at 3 East Hampton Road in Marlborough, Connecticut. Built in 1760, it was for many years a prominent stagecoach stop, and a center of the town's civic activities. It was listed on the National Register of Historic Places in 1978.

== Description and history ==
The former Marlborough Tavern stands prominently in the town center of Marlborough, at the southern corner of South Main Street and East Hampton Road (Connecticut Route 66). It is a 2-1/2 story wood frame structure, with a gambrel roof, central chimney, and a fieldstone foundation. Its main facade faces South Main Street, and is five bays wide. The center entrance is topped by a transom window and architrave. The steep line of the gambrel roof is puncture by three hip-roof dormers. The main block is extended to the left and rear by gabled additions. The interior of the main block retains original features, including paneling in its downstairs parlor and taproom spaces, and in the second-floor ballroom space.

The tavern was built about 1760. It was first operated by innkeeper Colonel Elisha Buell, who had a nearby gunsmith and metalworking shop, and was a prominent stagecoach stop on the road between Hartford and New London. The house was owned by the Buell family until 1898, and was given to the Society of Colonial Dames in the 20th century, who effected a restoration of the building. In 1978 the building was in use as a restaurant, the Marlborough Tavern. The restaurant closed in September 2011, and the building has housed a number of businesses between 2011 and 2018, and The Marlborough Tavern reopened as a restaurant and bar in November 2018.

== See also ==
- National Register of Historic Places listings in Hartford County, Connecticut
