= Nora Dannehy =

American attorney (born 1961)

Associate Justice of the Connecticut Supreme Court
- Incumbent
- Assumed office September 26, 2023
- Appointed by: Ned Lamont
- Preceded by: Maria Araújo Kahn

United States Attorney for the District of Connecticut
- In office April 4, 2008 – May 10, 2010
- President: George W. Bush; Barack Obama
- Preceded by: Kevin O'Connor
- Succeeded by: David B. Fein

Personal details
- Born: March 13, 1961 (age 65)
- Education: Wellesley College (BA); Harvard University (JD)

Nora Riordan Dannehy (born March 13, 1961) is an American attorney serving as an associate justice of the Connecticut Supreme Court since September 2023. She was previously appointed acting United States attorney for the District of Connecticut on April 4, 2008. She was the first woman to hold the office, which was established in 1789.

== Education ==
Born in Willimantic, Connecticut, Dannehy attended Windham High School. She received a Bachelor of Arts from Wellesley College in 1983 and a Juris Doctor from Harvard Law School in 1986.

== Career ==
She joined the United States Department of Justice in 1991. Prior to her appointment, she had served as professional officer for the District of Connecticut.

Dannehy prosecuted political corruption in Connecticut and won convictions of former Connecticut Governor John G. Rowland and former state treasurer Paul J. Silvester.

On September 29, 2008, Dannehy was appointed by United States Attorney General Michael B. Mukasey to continue an investigation into the George W. Bush administration's dismissals of nine federal prosecutors in 2006. Her role was to determine if anyone should be prosecuted following the investigation by the Inspector General and Office of Professional Responsibility of the Department of Justice, which had concluded that political pressure drove the dismissals of at least three of the federal prosecutors in 2006. Her investigation concluded that "Evidence did not demonstrate that any prosecutable criminal offense was committed with regard to the removal of David Iglesias," "The investigative team also determined that the evidence did not warrant expanding the scope of the investigation beyond the removal of Iglesias," and that "there was insufficient evidence to charge someone with lying to Congress or investigators."

On December 10, 2010, Dannehy was named by Connecticut Attorney General-elect George Jepsen to the post of deputy attorney general of the state.

On March 18, 2019, Dannehy returned to the U.S. Attorney's Office in Connecticut, as counsel to John Durham. She was Durham's deputy on the Durham special counsel investigation into the origins of the FBI investigation into Russian interference in the 2016 elections. Dannehy resigned from the Justice Department in September 2020 without a public explanation. The New York Times reported in January 2023 that during the investigation she had a series of disputes with Durham about his and attorney general William Barr's prosecutorial ethics. She pressed Durham to ask Barr to adhere to DOJ policy by not publicly discussing the ongoing investigation; as one example, in April 2020 Barr said on Fox News that "the evidence shows that we are not dealing with just mistakes or sloppiness. There is something far more troubling here." Durham declined her request. Months before the 2020 presidential election, Barr asked Durham to prepare an interim report relating to the Hillary Clinton 2016 presidential campaign and FBI gullibility or willful blindness. After Dannehy learned that other Durham prosecutors had drafted such a report, which she said contained disputed information and should not be released just before an election, she sent colleagues a memo explaining her concerns, and resigned.

In 2021, she was named top legal aide to Governor Ned Lamont.

On September 1, 2023 she was nominated by Lamont to a seat on the Connecticut Supreme Court, replacing Justice Maria Araújo Kahn who was appointed by President Joe Biden to serve as a judge of the United States Court of Appeals for the Second Circuit. On September 20, 2023, she received a hearing on her nomination and after 3 hours, the committee advanced her nomination by a 30–4 vote. On September 26, 2023, the General Assembly confirmed her nomination by a 31–2 vote in the Senate and 120–18 vote in the House. She was sworn in on the same day.

Legal offices
Preceded by Maria Araújo Kahn	Associate Justice of the Connecticut Supreme Court; 2023–present	Incumbent
