= Nina F. Elgo =

American judge from Connecticut

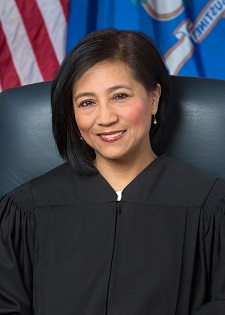

Judge of the Connecticut Appellate Court
- Incumbent
- Assumed office May 25, 2017
- Appointed by: Dan Malloy

Judge of the Connecticut Superior Court
- In office May 5, 2004 – May 25, 2017
- Appointed by: John G. Rowland

Personal details
- Born: June 18, 1962 (age 63) Groton, Connecticut, U.S.
- Education: Connecticut College (BA); Georgetown University (JD)

Nina F. Elgo (born June 18, 1962) is an American lawyer who serves as a judge of the Connecticut Appellate Court. She is the first Asian Pacific American to be appointed to the Connecticut Appellate Court and the Connecticut Superior Court.

== Education ==
Elgo received her Bachelor of Arts from Connecticut College in 1984 and her Juris Doctor from the Georgetown University Law Center in 1990.

== State judicial career ==
Prior to her appointment to the Appellate Court, she served as a Superior Court judge since May 5, 2004. At the time of her appointment she was the first Asian Pacific American judge appointed to the Connecticut Superior Court.

== Appointment to state appellate court ==
On May 2, 2017 Elgo was nominated to the Connecticut Appellate Court by Dan Malloy. The General Assembly confirmed her appointment on May 25, 2017. With her confirmation, it marked the first time in the court's history where women held the majority. She is the first Asian Pacific American judge appointed to the Connecticut Appellate Court.

== Awards and recognition ==
In 2015, she was honored with the Native Daughter of Norwich Award; in 2014, she was the recipient of the CT Asian Pacific American Bar Association Impact Award; and in 2013, she was the recipient of the Edwin Archer Randolph Diversity Award. As the first Asian Pacific American judge in Connecticut, she was honored in 2006 by the Connecticut Trial Lawyers Association Women's Caucus as a "Trailblazer in the Connecticut Judiciary." She was also a recipient of the 2007 Connecticut Bar Association's Young Lawyers Section Diversity Award.

== Personal ==
Elgo is married to attorney Christopher Kriesen and they have a daughter.

== See also ==
- List of Asian American jurists
