= Edwin Archer Randolph =

American lawyer, politician, and journalist

- Born: c. 1850
- Died: Unknown
- Occupations: American lawyer, politician, and journalist
- Known for: The first African-American to graduate from Yale Law School, and the first African-American lawyer to be admitted to the Connecticut bar

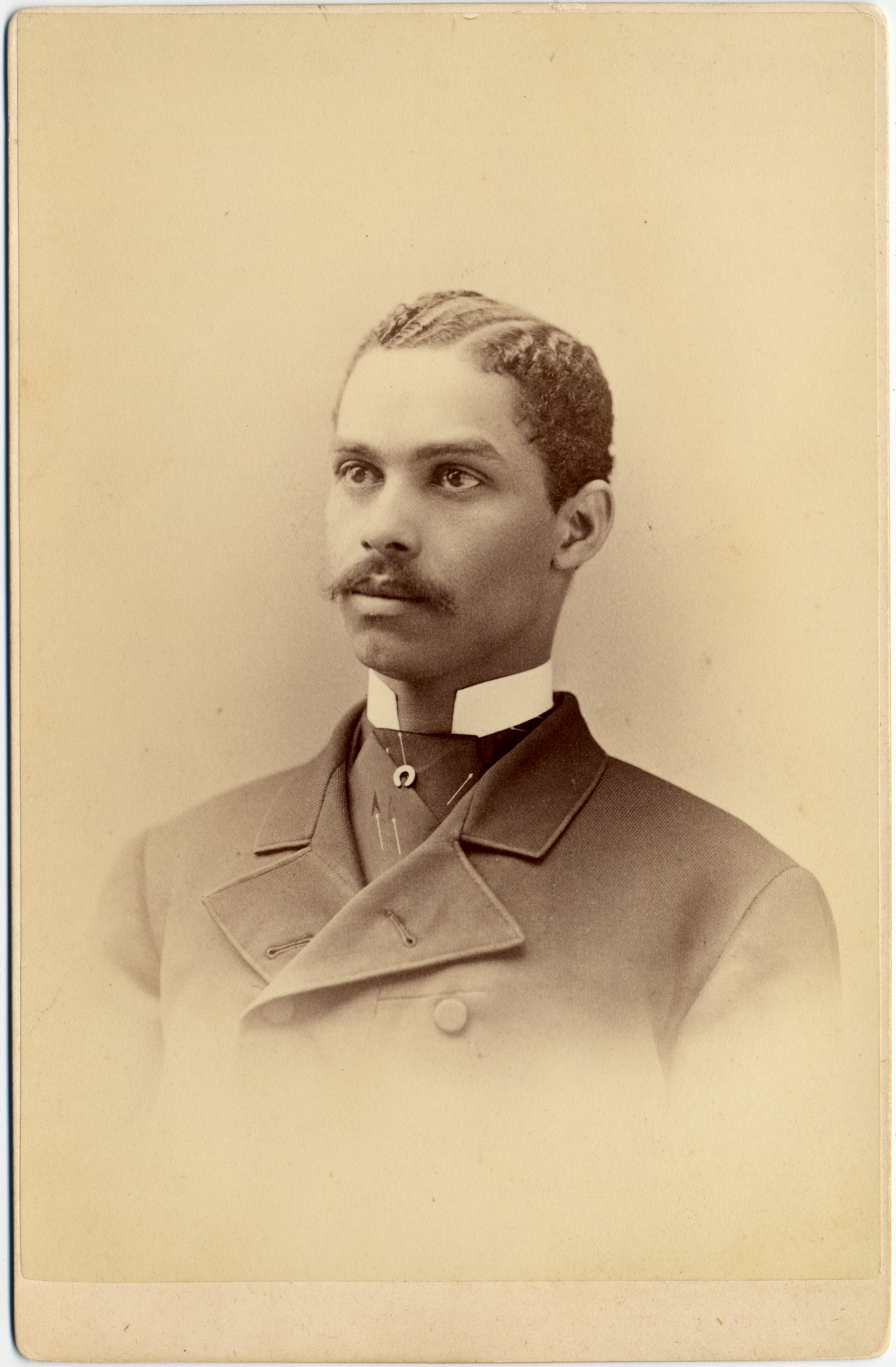
Portrait of Edwin Archer Randolph as a Yale Law School student

Edwin Archer Randolph (c. 1850- unknown) was an African-American lawyer, politician, and journalist from Virginia. In 1880, Randolph became the first African-American to graduate from Yale Law School. In July 1880, Randolph was the first African-American to be admitted to the Connecticut bar.

Randolph was born around 1850, to a family of free parentage. In his youth, Randolph worked as a driver for a white physician, Dr. James B. McCaw. McCaw was the medical superintendent of Chimborazo Hospital, during the Civil War. In the mid-1870s Randolph left Richmond to attend Wayland Seminary and then in 1878 he entered Yale Law School.

Whilst practicing law in Virginia, Randolph also served as a councilman and alderman in Richmond. Randolph was elected to the common council in Richmond, from 1881 to 1883. From 1883 to 1886 he served on the board of alderman and from 1884 to 1885, he was on Virginia’s commissions for the World Exposition in New Orleans. Randolph also served on both houses of the Virginia state legislature and also edited and published an African-American newspaper, The Richmond Planet, also edited by John Mitchell Jr. In 1884, he published ‘'The life of Rev. John Jasper, pastor of Sixth Mt. Zion Baptist Church, Richmond, Va. : from his birth to the present time, with his theory on the rotation of the sun’'.

The Lawyers Collaborative for Diversity (LCD) presents Edwin Archer Randolph Diversity Awards for those who promote "inclusion and advancement of lawyers of color and other professionals".

== See also ==
- List of first minority male lawyers and judges in Connecticut
