= Mary Hall =

American lawyer (1843–1927)

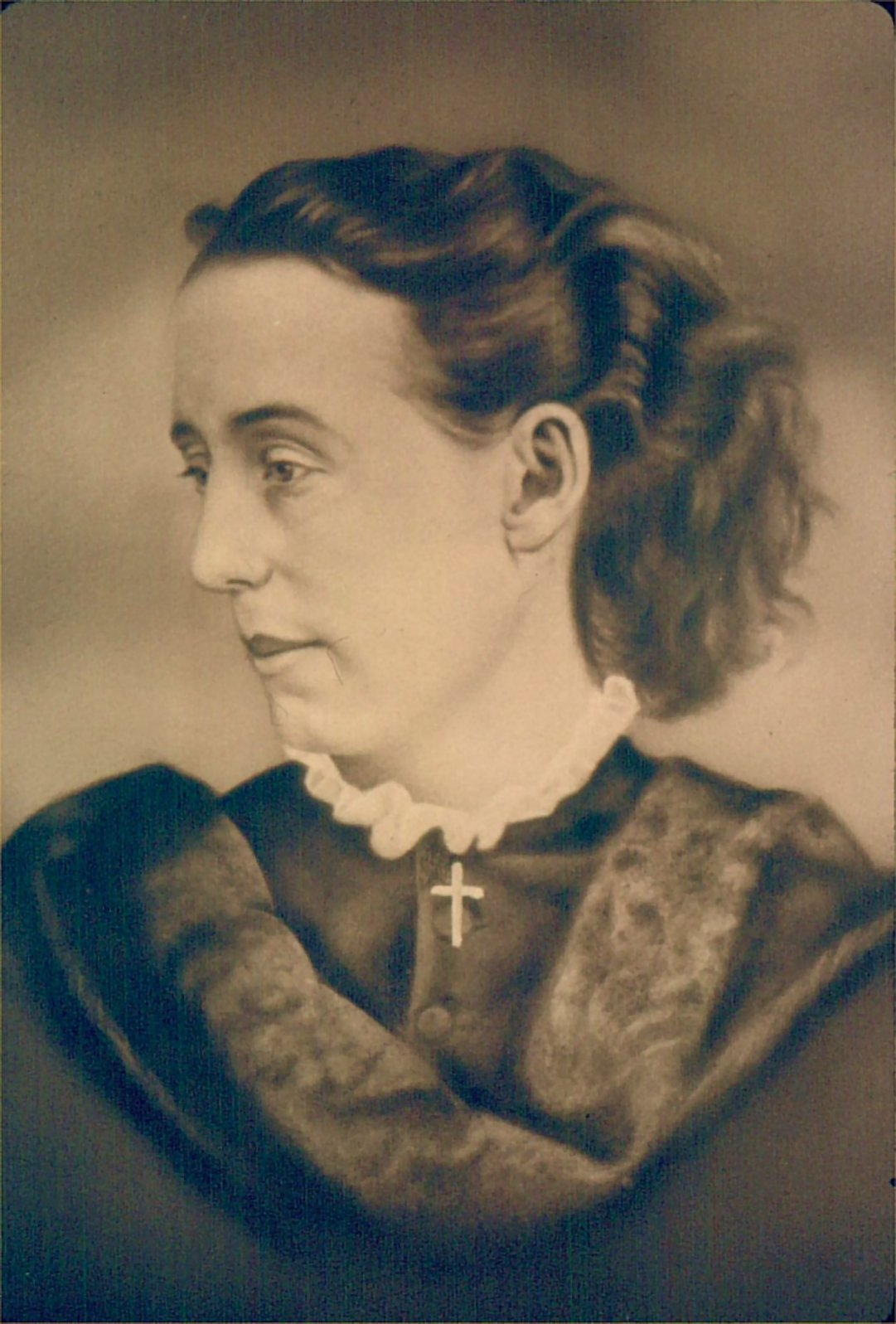
- Born: August 16, 1843; Marlborough, Connecticut
- Died: November 15, 1927 (aged 84)
- Occupations: Lawyer, poet, suffragist, philanthropist

Mary Hall (August 16, 1843 – November 15, 1927) was the first female lawyer in Connecticut, and also a poet, a suffragist, and a philanthropist. In 1882, the Connecticut Supreme Court of Errors' decision to allow Hall to be admitted to the Connecticut Bar was the first judicial decision in the nation to hold that women were permitted to practice law.

== Early life ==
Mary Hall was born in Marlborough, Connecticut, one of seven children of Gustavus E. Hall and Louisa (Skinner) Hall. Gustavus Hall was a prosperous farmer and miller, known to be one of liberal convictions. Hall graduated from Wesleyan Academy in Wilbraham, Massachusetts, in 1866. She was an accomplished poet, winning a medal for her commencement poem and having her poems published in newspapers. Hall then went on to teach mathematics at the LaSalle Seminary near Boston, where she became the Chair of Mathematics.

In 1877, Hall decided to pursue the study of law. She approached her brother, Ezra, who was already an attorney and Connecticut State Senator, about her decision. Although he gave her no encouragement, upon her insistence, he gave her a copy of difficult legal work. After watching her study the work with great enthusiasm, Ezra decided to allow Hall to apprentice in his office. However, Ezra died a few months later in April 1878. John Hooker, the Clerk of the Supreme Court of Errors, took Hall in as his apprentice, beginning on April 2, 1879. That year, Belva Lockwood became the first woman admitted to argue before the U.S. Supreme Court. Hall studied law and copied and prepared judicial opinions under Hooker's supervision and instruction for over three years.

On April 2, 1880, while studying law, Hall founded the Good Will Club, a charity for underprivileged boys, particularly newspaper boys. The program provided education as well as vocational training. The Club began with nine boys, but eventually grew to 3.000 boys, with its own facilities and newspaper called "The Good Will Star." Despite her eventual practice of law, the Club was "Mary Hall's first priority, and her life's work."

== Pursuit of becoming a lawyer ==
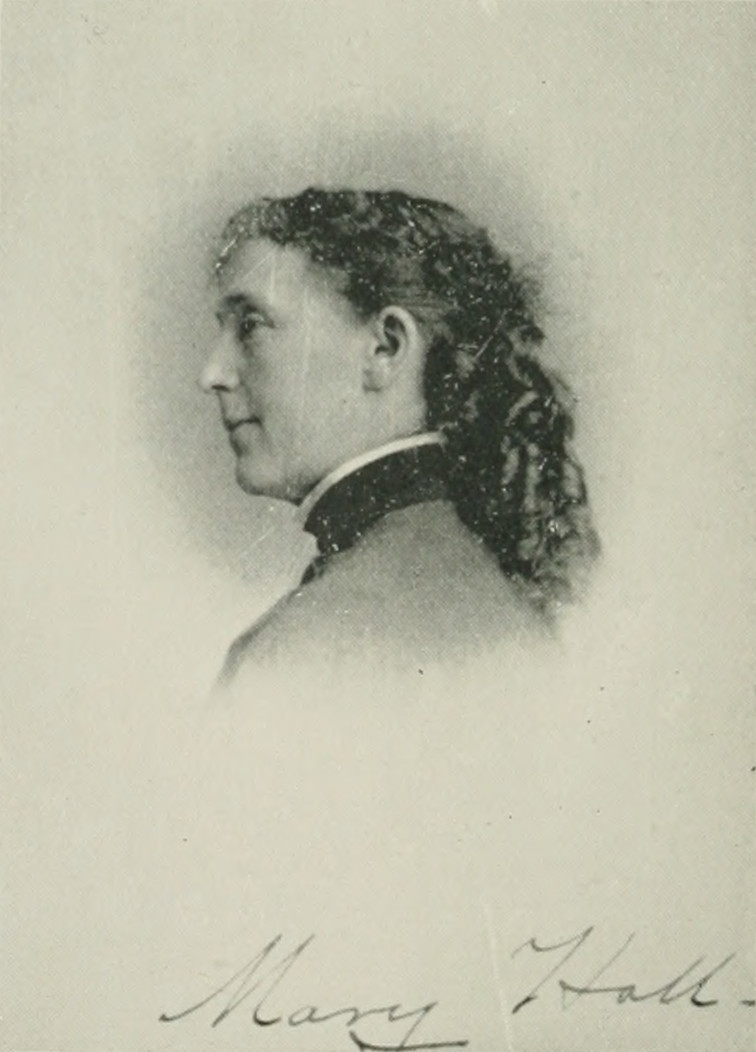
Mary Hall

In 1882, at the age of 38, Mary Hall made her application to the Connecticut Bar. She passed an examination on March 22, 1882. On March 24, 1882, the Hartford Bar Association held a regular meeting at which Hooker moved to have Hall admitted to the usual examination before the Bar Examining Committee, attesting that she had studied law in his office for three years and that she possessed the requisite qualifications for admission to the bar. The members agreed to allow Hall to be examined for the bar, subject to the ruling of the Supreme Court of Errors on its legality.

Hall had many supporters nationwide who believed that her admission to the Bar would be important for women's suffrage. An editorial published in the Hartford Courant stated: "It is to be hoped that the members of the Hartford county bar will not see fit to put themselves on the illiberal side, on the pending application of an accomplished lady for admission to the bar. When women are allowed as teachers and as physicians without question, it would be taking a long step backward to refuse their admission to the bar. It would be regarded as a confession of fear on the part of men." Another article stated, "Those very earnest and patient people of both sexes who advocate woman suffrage will look upon Miss Hall's success in getting a decision in her favor as an important contribution to the triumph of their cause."

== In re Hall ==
In May 1882, Thomas McManus submitted the brief in support of Hall in the case labeled In re Hall. He argued that "save sex," there was no other reason why Hall should not be found to be qualified to be admitted to the Bar. Noting that women preached in churches, practiced medicine, taught in the classroom, and acted as executors, guardians, trustees, and overseers, he claimed that the language of the statute regulating attorneys "neither expressly [n]or impliedly exclude[d] women" and that "attorney" was defined as a "person." Opposing counsel was Goodwin Collier, who argued that at the time the statute was enacted, women were excluded from the Bar and the legislature's failure to change the statute indicated its intent to continue to exclude women.

On July 19, 1882, the Connecticut Supreme Court of Errors issued its decision in favor of Hall. Chief Justice John Park wrote for the Court and took the position, contrary to Collier's argument, that if the legislature wanted to exclude women, it would have rewritten the statute to expressly exclude them. Park explained his opinion, stating, "We are not to forget that all statutes are to be construed, as far as possible, in favor of equality of rights. All restrictions upon human liberty, all claims for special privileges, are to be regarded as having the presumption of law against them, and as standing upon their defense, and can be sustained, if at all by valid legislation, only by the clear expression or clear implication of the law." This decision had the effect of holding that the laws of equal protection applied to women because he in effect rejected the "entire jurisprudence of separate spheres." It has been said that this decision as "[o]ne of the greatest decisions in all of Connecticut jurisprudence."

== Later years ==
During her legal career, Hall mostly confined herself to office work, assisting Hooker in preparing the Connecticut Reports and handling wills and property matters for women. Hall rarely appeared in court because "public sentiment would be much against a woman's speaking in court."

In addition to her legal work, Hall became increasingly involved in suffrage and social reform activities. In March 1885, Hall helped to found the Hartford Woman Suffrage Club and served as its Vice President. She also attended the International Council of Women to celebrate the first Woman's Rights Convention, where the International Woman's Bar Association was founded. Hall was then elected Assistant Secretary at the Connecticut Woman's Suffrage Association convention. In 1895, Hall became a member of the State Board of Charities and was responsible for investigating and regulating the charitable institutions through the state. She also testified before the State Judiciary Committee in 1905 against a bill that would prohibit girls from selling newspapers.

Mary Hall is remembered as a pioneer in the legal profession and a suffragist and reformist in Connecticut because of her dedication to the cause of women and of the welfare of underprivileged children.
