= Carmen E. Espinosa =

American judge

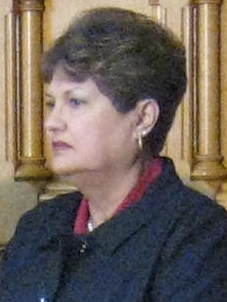

Carmen E. Espinosa is a former justice of the Connecticut Supreme Court. She became a senior justice on July 16, 2017.

== Education ==
Espinosa received a Juris Doctor from The George Washington University Law School; a Master of Arts in Hispanic Studies from Brown University and a Bachelor of Science in secondary education with a major in Spanish and French from Central Connecticut State University.

== See also ==
- List of Hispanic and Latino American jurists
