= Cambridge University Press v. Patton =

American copyright case law

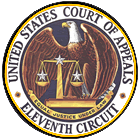
- Court: United States Court of Appeals for the Eleventh Circuit, United States District Court for the Northern District of Georgia
- Full case name: Cambridge University Press et al. v. Becker et al.

Court membership
- Judges sitting: Orinda Dale Evans (N.D. Ga.); Gerald Bard Tjoflat, Stanley Marcus, Roger Vinson (11th Cir.)

Keywords
- E-reserves; fair use

Cambridge University Press et al. v. Patton et al. (also captioned v. Becker), 1:2008cv01425, was a case in the United States District Court for the Northern District of Georgia in which three publishers, Cambridge University Press, SAGE Publications, and Oxford University Press, initially filed suit in 2008 against Georgia State University for copyright infringement.

== Background ==
The plaintiffs claimed that Georgia State University engaged in "systematic, widespread and unauthorized copying and distribution of a vast amount of copyrighted works" through its e-reserves system. Georgia State asserted that its system did not infringe copyright because its uses were fair use.

The district court issued a 350-page findings of fact and conclusions of law on 11 May 2012, finding that in almost all cases the alleged infringements were fair use. In a subsequent decision the court deemed that Georgia State University was the prevailing party and ordered the plaintiffs to pay GSU's attorney's fees. The plaintiffs characterized the decision as "flawed" but not a "loss", and filed an appeal.

The costs of the litigation were funded in large part by the Copyright Clearance Center, a licensing company which funded 50% of the litigation and announced plans to continue to do so on appeal, and the Association of American Publishers (AAP).

On 17 October 2014, the 11th Circuit reversed and remanded to the lower court for reconsideration in light of its opinion. The 11th Circuit reversed the grant of attorney's fees, and closely examined the lower court's 300-plus page fair use decision in their own 129-page decision, affirming and reversing various portions of the District Court's analysis. On 31 March 2016, the lower court issued its decision on remand, finding this time 4 of 49 to be infringements, and again awarding costs and attorneys' fees to Georgia State University as the prevailing party.

The case concluded on 29 September 2020, when "Judge Orinda Evans declared GSU to be the prevailing party after finding the plaintiff publishers succeeded in establishing copyright infringement in just 10 of 99 claims brought to trial."

== Pre-trial ==
Cambridge University Press, SAGE Publications, and Oxford University Press filed the lawsuit on 15 April 2008. They named four Georgia State officials as the defendants. The plaintiffs alleged that Georgia State made over 6,700 works available through its e-reserves system and website. They also alleged that the university "invit[ed] students to download, view, and print such materials without permission of the copyright holder." The plaintiffs alleged direct, vicarious, and contributory infringement. They filed for summary judgment on all three claims, and Georgia State submitted counter-motions for summary judgment.

On 17 February 2009, the Georgia Board of Regents changed the challenged e-reserve system, making it more similar to peer institutions. Following this change, on 22 June 2009, the university was granted a court order that limited discovery to the university's ongoing conduct.

On 1 October 2010, Judge Orinda Evans granted summary judgment in favor of Georgia State on the claims of direct and vicarious infringement. She granted summary judgment on direct infringement because there was not enough evidence to show that any of the four named defendants engaged in acts of infringement. She also granted summary judgment on vicarious infringement because there was no evidence the named defendants profited from the alleged infringement of librarians working under them. The plaintiffs then submitted a partial motion for reconsideration. The judge granted it, allowing the vicarious infringement claim to go forward under a theory of indirect liability.

Money damages were not at issue in the case. Under the doctrine of state sovereign immunity, the plaintiffs could only seek injunctive relief against Georgia State.

=== Reaction to the initial lawsuit ===
Both librarians and publishers watched this case for its implications for broader conflicts about fair use and copyright infringement in the education community. As universities replace traditional printed resources with electronic course resources (either in the form of e-reserves or electronic course packs), publishers have sought to limit unlicensed uses in these forms. Similar cases have been filed against universities, including UCLA, and in other countries, York University, Delhi University, and New Zealand. In Seattle, a lawsuit was filed against a commercial copyshop serving Seattle University. The District Court distinguished the university, a nonprofit educational institution directly serving its users, from the commercial copyshops found to have infringed copyright in two cases in the early 1990s.

Academic librarians and their lawyers have described the case as a "nightmare scenario." Barbara Fister, a librarian at Gustavus Adolphus College, has suggested that the plaintiffs have lost sight of their missions, which include furthering education and scholarship. Similarly, Paul Courant, University Librarian and dean of libraries at the University of Michigan, has argued that the plaintiffs in this suit are in danger of becoming enemies, rather than simply adversaries, of libraries and authors. Kevin Smith, the director of scholarly communications at Duke University, has said that a broad holding in the plaintiffs' favor would have "catastrophic consequences," either limiting the information that students can read or greatly increasing the cost of higher education. Both Fister and Smith also suggest that a narrow interpretation of fair use could lead more professors and academic authors to embrace the open access movement.

Publishers and their representatives also feel that the stakes are very high. Tom Allen, president and CEO of the Association of American Publishers, has written that Georgia State's policy "invited disregard for basic copyright norms" and would threaten copyright's incentives for producing original work. Allen emphasized that educational purpose is not enough for a finding of fair use—other factors also enter the analysis. He also wrote that Georgia State's practices, if universalized, could bring down the entire "creative ecosystem." Sandy Thatcher, then the executive editor for social sciences and humanities at Penn State University Press, commented in 2010 that the loss of revenue from the unlicensed electronic use of copyrighted material limited the University Press's ability to publish new books.

== Trial ==
The trial began on 17 May 2011 and ended on 8 June 2011. After hearing the plaintiffs' arguments, Judge Evans granted the defendants' motion for a directed verdict on the claim of contributory infringement. The defendants' arguments largely related to fair use. The parties filed their final post-trial briefs later that summer.

The district court issued a 350-page findings of fact and conclusions of law on 11 May 2012, a ruling that was appealed to the Eleventh Circuit.

The Court found that most uses considered were fair use, considering the purpose of the use (nonprofit educational), the nature of the works (scholarly and factual), the amount taken (often less than 10%), and the effect on the market (little or to none known especially where there was no license available for electronic excerpts). Of the other allegations, the Court dismissed some as de minimis (because no students had in fact used the reserve copies), and dismissed others because the plaintiffs could not show that they actually owned the copyrights. Specific factual fightings included the Court determining that the relevant length of the work was the entire work, not individual chapters or portions of works, and a finding "that no book sales were lost." Based on the overwhelming number that were found to be non-infringing, the Court held Georgia State to be the "prevailing party", and awarded attorney's fees to Georgia State.

== First appeal ==
The plaintiffs appealed to the 11th Circuit, which heard oral arguments in the fall of 2013.

On 17 October 2014, the 11th Circuit reversed and remanded to the lower court for reconsideration in light of its opinion. The 11th Circuit reversed the grant of attorney's fees, and closely examined Judge Evans' 300-plus page fair use decision in their own 129-page decision.

They affirmed the lower court's holdings on the first factor, finding that the course reserves were not transformative, but that nonprofit educational uses are favored under fair use. They reversed the lower court on the second fair use factor, requiring a closer examination of the original works and the relative composition of original analysis data. However, they noted that this factor "is of relatively little importance in this case."

On the third factor, the 11th Circuit held that the lower court had erred in establishing a strict quantitative test for the "amount and substantiality taken". Evans had suggested that less than 10% or one chapter in ten would be considered fair use; more than that, perhaps not. The 11th Circuit held that per se rules were not appropriate, and that the third factor had to be considered separately in light of the first and fourth factors.

On the fourth factor, the 11th Circuit agreed with the lower court that "the small excerpts Defendants used do not substitute for the full books from which they were drawn," and ultimately found "that the District Court's analysis under the fourth factor was correct, and that the District Court properly took license availability into account in determining whether the fourth factor weighted for or against fair use." The publishers had argued that the District Court had erroneously shifted the burden of proof to plaintiffs on the question of license availability, but the 11th Circuit found no error on this point. Instead, the Court held that requiring plaintiffs to produce evidence of availability was "reasonable", since "Plaintiffs–as publishers–can reasonably be expected to have the evidence as to availability of licenses for their own works." After such evidence is presented, defendants still "retain[] the overall burden of persuasion on the fourth factor".

The 11th Circuit also held that "the District Court did not err in performing a work-by-work analysis of individual instances of alleged infringement."

However, the 11th Circuit held that "the District Court did err by giving each of the four fair use factors equal weight, and by treating the four factors mechanistically."

The 11th Circuit vacated the injunction and declaratory relief, and the award of attorney's fees and costs, and remanded to the lower court for further proceedings.

District Court Judge Vinson, sitting on this panel, wrote a concurrence in which he disagreed with several of the majority's holdings. The concurrence reads more like a dissent, including language that asserts the notion of fair use originally was a common law creation and thus "fair use analysis does not require conventional statutory interpretation."

== Subsequent proceedings ==
On remand, the District Court applied the 11th Circuit's guidance, and ultimately found even fewer infringements (four in total) and again awarded attorney's fees. The plaintiffs again appealed to the 11th Circuit, which in October 2018 held that the District Court had been too mechanistic in its approach to fair use and remanded for a third review.

== Conclusion ==
The case closed on 29 September 2020, with GSU as the prevailing party.

== See also ==
- American Geophysical Union v. Texaco, 60 F.3d 913 (1995), Second Circuit Court of Appeals case holding private company research library's similar photocopying of journal articles was not fair use due to commercial purpose
- Authors Guild, Inc. v. HathiTrust, 755 F.3d 87 (2d Cir. 2014), finding search and accessibility uses of digitized books to be fair use
- Williams & Wilkins Co. v. United States, 487 F.2d 1345 (Ct. Cl. 1973), ruling that libraries photocopying articles for use by patrons engaged in scientific research is fair use
- Books in the United States
- List of copyright case law
