= Alexis T. Bell =

American chemical engineer

- Born: October 16, 1942 (age 83); New York City, U.S.
- Education: Massachusetts Institute of Technology (B.S., Ph.D.)
- Known for: Heterogeneous catalysis; Catalytic reaction mechanisms; Electrocatalysis for water splitting; Fischer–Tropsch process
- Awards: National Academy of Engineering (1987); American Association for the Advancement of Science Fellow (1988); Russian Academy of Sciences; American Academy of Arts and Sciences (2007)
- Scientific career
- Fields: Chemical engineering; Catalysis; Physical chemistry
- Workplaces: University of California, Berkeley; Lawrence Berkeley National Laboratory

Alexis Tarassov Bell (born October 16, 1942) is an American chemical engineer. He is currently the Dow professor of Sustainable Chemistry in the Department of Chemical and Biomolecular Engineering in UC Berkeley's college of chemistry. He is also the Faculty Senior Scientist at Lawrence Berkeley National Laboratory. He is known for his work with heterogenous catalysts and characterizing the mechanisms of these reactions on a quantum level.

== Early life and education ==
Bell was born on October 16, 1942, in New York City, the only child of immigrant parents. He grew up in midtown Manhattan and attended McBurney School. Bell studied chemical engineering at Massachusetts Institute of Technology (MIT) and got his bachelor's degree in 1964 and his PhD in 1967. His doctoral thesis was on the Chemical reaction in a radiofrequency discharge: the oxidation of hydrogen chloride. Bell joined the Chemical Engineering Faculty at UC Berkeley after getting his PhD in 1967.

== Career ==
Bell remains at UC Berkeley doing work in the Chemical Engineering Faculty. Bell's research first started in the 1970s with plasma and to date one of his most cited papers is from 1974 is Techniques and applications of plasma chemistry. In the 1970s, Bell started his work in catalysis; an older mentor offered him a research grant as long as the work was done on catalysts. A lot of Bell's work was done with an infrared spectrometer and studying the rate of oxidative reactions over metal catalysts. Bell and a colleague completed their research on ethylene epoxidation, which was published in 1975 in the Journal of Catalysis. In 1975, Bell became the principal investigator in the Chemical Sciences Division at Lawrence Berkeley National Laboratory. In the mid 1970s, Bell's catalysis research gained attention from other surface-chemistry chemists. Bell collaborated with many chemists doing work in surface catalytic reactions throughout his career.

Bell has been recognized for many rewards throughout his entire career. Bell was elected as a member of the National Academy of Engineering and the National Academy of Sciences in the United States. Bell has been highly recognized by his Chinese and Russian peers who have granted him many honorary awards. Bell has continued his work in heterogenous catalysts and more recently has made an impact with his work in quantum chemistry modeling of catalytic activity sites and metal oxides as catalysts. In the time Bell has worked at UC Berkeley, he has been the Editor in Chief of Catalysis Reviews - Science and Engineering and Chemical Engineering Science and was appointed chair of a Panel on New Directions in Catalytic Science and Technology for the National Research Council from 1989 to 1991. Bell also held a workshop of the report Catalysis Looks to the Future, which had many reports presented to the house and senate committees dealing with science and technology.

== Research ==
Some of Bell's earliest work was done on the techniques and applications of plasma chemistry. Bell moved on to look at mechanisms of oxidation processes through infrared spectroscopic techniques. Bell was known for his process when performing research: "identify important questions; master the spectroscopic and numerical tools needed to address the problem; determine the detailed reaction chemistry; and then share with the community the relationship between the reaction chemistry and process performance." Air pollution was a major societal problem in the 1970s and catalytic reactions offered a solution to removing harmful pollutants from car exhausts. Bell looked at the oxidation/reduction of certain CO_{x} and NO_{x} through absorption on metal catalysts. This could help lower the CO pollution that was found coming out of automobiles.

Bell started with his research by looking at adsorbed species on metal catalysts by using infrared techniques. Bell wanted to study the mechanism and rates of these reactions to characterize the species that forms on the surface. One of Bell's most impactful work from the 1970s was the identification of surface structures on a silver catalyst during the oxidation of ethylene. He was able to provide a mechanism of the epoxidation process and qualitatively explain the kinetics of the oxidation reaction. From this work he continued on looking at CO and CO_{2} hydrocarbon synthesis over silica-Ru catalysts. The main purpose of this work was to truly understand the rate determining steps and how hydrocarbons form at the silica-Ru surface from Fischer-Tropsch synthesis.

In the 1980s, Bell continued looking at Fischer-Tropsch synthesis over Ru catalysts to look at the growth of hydrocarbon chains based from carbon monoxide hydrogenation to methanol. The work continued on to look at adsorption reactions of NO and CO on metal catalysts. This work helped Bell determine the key rate-determining steps happening at the surface of the metal catalyst. Bell's work started looking at mathematical based methods to describe resist spin coating. These models combined with the growth of hydrocarbons over metal catalysts lead to his work on silica surfaces, which lead to his work on zeolites. By the end of the 1980s, Bell was incorporating Raman and NMR spectroscopy techniques to analyze zeolite structures in alumina-silicate solutions. The Bell group discovered how metal zeolite crystallites transformed in the reaction environment, the interactions in the environment and the change of species over time.

Bell continued his work with oxidation of hydrocarbons by looking at vanadium oxide catalysts and analyzing them through Raman spectroscopy. He continued through the 1990s looking at zeolites as catalysts and different adsorption of aromatic hydrocarbons on the surface. Bell was able to thermodynamically and mechanistically describe the absorption of aromatic hydrocarbons on the surface of silicate zeolites. Bell wanted to study reduction and oxidation reactions of hydrocarbons on aluminosilicate zeolite surfaces. By the end of the 1990s, Bell had come up with techniques that allowed him to synthesize these aluminosilicate zeolites and identify the species involved in synthesis through NMR techniques.

In the early 2000, Bell submitted his work on heterogenous catalysts and could describe the reduction and oxidation of nanoparticles through catalytic reactions to reduce the amount CO pollution. His current research work is being done on the quantum models of thin film catalysts. Bell's research also went on to look at the electrochemical evolution of oxygen and found how metals could enhance the metal oxide activity for the electrochemical evolution. Bell continues to find efficient ways of catalyzing the electrolysis of water using quantum models to analyze the absorbed species on the metal catalyzed by different spectroscopic techniques. Bell has been a pioneer throughout the years working on oxidation/reduction reactions of CO and NO to understand the selectivity and limiting factors.

== Honors and awards ==
- Curtis W. McGraw Award for Research, American Association of Engineering Education
- The Professional Progress and R. H. Wilhelm Awards, the American Institute of Chemical Engineers
- Paul H. Emmett Award in Fundamental Catalysis, Catalysis Society
- National Academy of Engineering (1987)
- Fellow of the American Association for the Advancement of Science (1988)
- the ACS Award for Creative Research in Homogeneous or Heterogeneous Catalysis, ACS (2001)
- Honorary professor, Siberian Branch of the Russian Academy of Sciences (2001)
- William H. Walker Award of the AIChE (2005)
- Elected to the American Academy of Arts and Sciences (2007)
- NACS Award for Distinguished Service in the Advancement of Catalysis (2018)
