= American Geophysical Union v. Texaco, Inc. =

1995 American copyright infringement case

Coordinates: 41.5186°N 73.9373°W

- Court: United States Court of Appeals for the Second Circuit
- Argued: May 20, 1993
- Decided: October 28, 1994
- Citations: 60 F.3d 913; 1995 Copr.L.Dec. (CCH) ¶ 27,417, 35 U.S.P.Q.2d 1513

Case history
- Prior history: Judgement for plaintiffs, 802 F.Supp. 1 (S.D.N.Y., 1992)
- Subsequent history: Amended December 23, 1994; further amended July 17, 1995. cert den., 516 U.S. 1005 (1995)

Holding
- Photocopying of articles from scientific journals for benefit of research scientists by library at private, for-profit facility was not fair use since ultimate aim was to assist researchers in developing better products for commercial sale and photocopies were used in substantially the same way as the articles copied; copying also cost publishers license fees they otherwise could have collected.

Court membership
- Judges sitting: Jon O. Newman, Ralph K. Winter Jr., Dennis Jacobs

Case opinions
- Majority: Newman, joined by Winter
- Dissent: Jacobs

Laws applied
- Copyright Act of 1976

American Geophysical Union v. Texaco, Inc., 60 F.3d 913, was a 1995 U.S. copyright case holding that a private, for-profit corporate library could not rely on fair use in systematically making copies of articles in academic journals for its employees. A divided panel of the U.S. Court of Appeals for the Second Circuit affirmed a ruling by Judge Pierre Leval of the U.S. District Court for the Southern District of New York in favor of the academic publishers who had filed the lawsuit. The case was the first heard by the Second Circuit to seriously consider the question of transformative use, a concept Leval had introduced, in evaluating a fair use claim. (Note: Leval had described transformative use in a 1990 Harvard Law Review article. The following year the Southern District rejected the Kinko's chain of photocopy centers' claim that its unlicensed photocopying from texts to make packets for professors' syllabi was transformative use since it was "a mere repackaging" of the originals, paraphrasing Leval, the first time a court considered the concept; the decision was not appealed. In 1993 the Second Circuit mentioned transformative use, citing Leval, in Twin Peaks Productions Inc. v. Publications International Ltd., but did not discuss it in depth in its opinion as it would in Texaco.)

In the wake of an earlier case that had held similar archival photocopying of academic articles by a government agency's internal library to be fair use due to the public purpose of the agency, Congress had urged the academic publishing industry to develop ways to adequately license such photocopying, a common practice, by private, for-profit libraries. One such system was in place during the 1980s, but Texaco declined to use it, citing its cumbersome bureaucratic requirements and its belief that the practice was fair use, leading several academic publishers, including the American Geophysical Union (AGU), to sue for copyright infringement.

At trial Leval found that Texaco's fair use defense failed on three of the four factors used to determine fair use. The copies were used for the same informational purpose as the original articles, and Leval did not find that the ability they gave the scientists to bring them into the lab or home was sufficiently transformative. The articles were copied in their entirety and adversely affected commercial opportunities for the publishers in the form of the lost revenue they otherwise would have made from licensing the photocopying and/or the sale of additional subscriptions to their journals. Only on the second factor, the purpose of the work, did Leval hold for Texaco, since both the originals and the copies were used commercially.

Two years later, the Second Circuit took into account the Supreme Court's Campbell v. Acuff-Rose Music, Inc. decision in the interim, which had recognized transformative use when it held parody to be protected under fair use. Judge Jon O. Newman's majority opinion, amended twice over the year following, criticized Leval for having emphasized Texaco's commercial purpose, and held that the second-factor test, the purpose of the work, favored neither side, but otherwise affirmed his holding. Judge Dennis Jacobs dissented, arguing that the use of the photocopied articles was indeed transformative since ultimately they could lead to new research and new ideas, as well as attacking as "circular" the majority's lost revenue finding when the entire purpose of the case was to determine whether the use that gave rise to those revenues was fair, themes echoed in criticisms by academic commentators. After further appeals were denied, Texaco settled the case.

== Background ==
=== Williams & Wilkins Co. v. United States ===
Since the early 20th century, libraries had offered patrons the ability to make copies of documents, at considerable expense, with photostat machines. In the 1960s, commercial xerographic photocopying machines became widely available in libraries, allowing patrons to duplicate reading material for personal use. This diluted the value publishers could get for their work, and many in particular objected to the practice of institutional libraries of making copies in bulk of work considered useful by specialist patrons who might otherwise have to wait for a book to be returned, take extensive notes from a copy while in the library, or handwrite or retype the article. In 1973 several academic publishers filed suit against the federal government in the U.S. Court of Claims, arguing that such photocopying by the library of the National Institutes of Health (NIH) and the National Library of Medicine (NLM) for the researchers in their employ was copyright infringement. The government countered that the photocopying was fair use. At trial Judge James F. Davis held the government liable, but on appeal the court's full membership reversed.

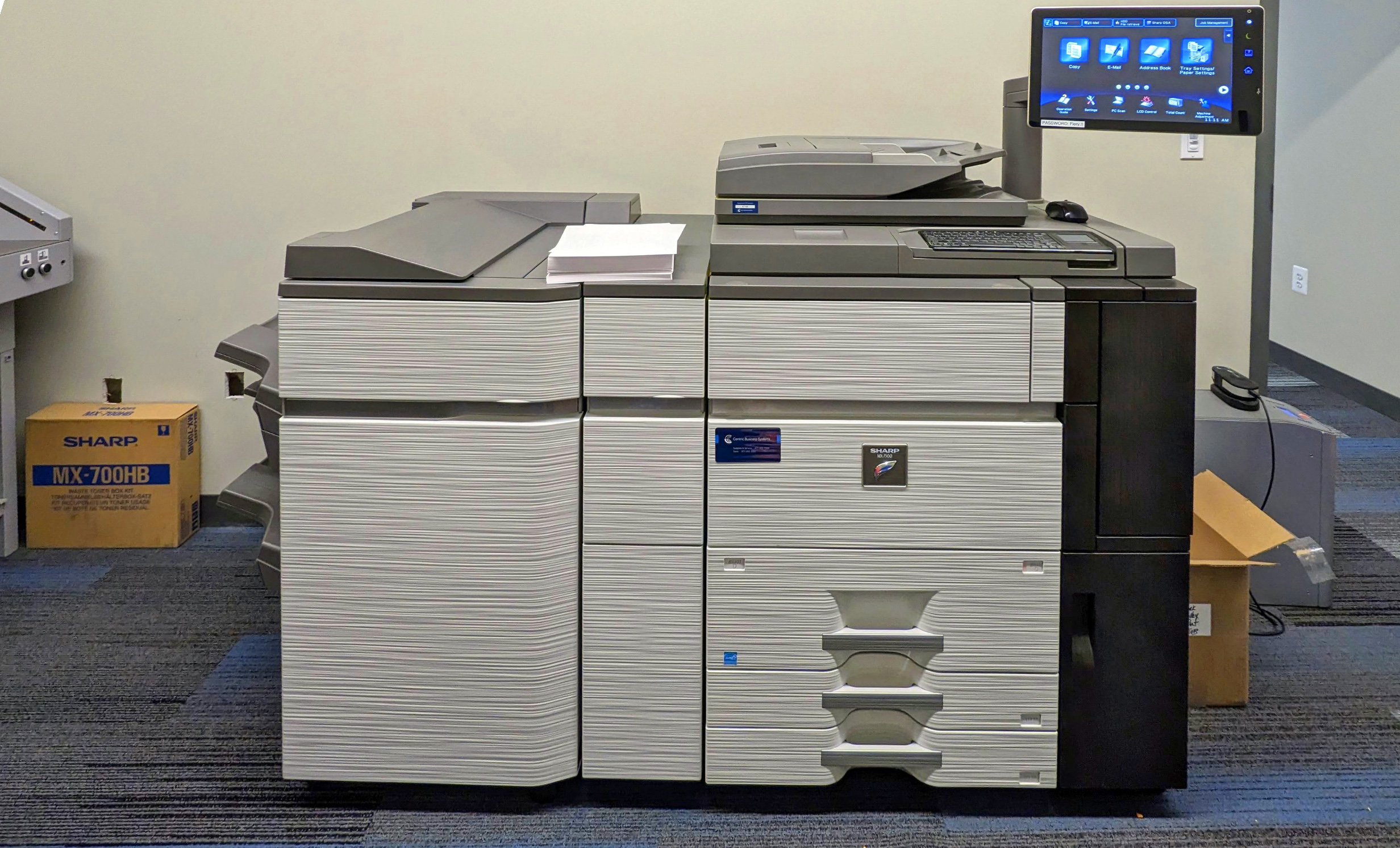
Photocopier used for bulk copying (in 2023)

Judge Oscar Hirsh Davis, writing for the majority, found the vague language in the Copyright Act of 1909 around copying work complicated the case. He looked instead to fair use, noting that the practice of photocopying in some way in libraries was at least half a century old, that the NIH and NLM limited the amount of copies a user could request per month, that they were not commercial entities but government agencies working towards the public good, and that the photocopying did not seem to have measurably affected the market for subscriptions to the plaintiff's journals. Chief Judge Arnold Wilson Cowen, joined by Robert Lowe Kunzig and Philip Nichols Jr., dissented, arguing the majority had placed too much emphasis on facts favoring the defense. It had not noted, as the trial judge had, that the 1909 Act was not at all vague about what copying meant, that the libraries routinely granted exceptions to the limits the majority had noted, and that measured in terms of the plaintiff's journals it had been adversely affected. He included a portion of the trial judge's opinion, which he thought needed no elaboration, in his dissent.

The publishers appealed to the U.S. Supreme Court, which granted certiorari and heard the case. Justice Harry Blackmun recused himself, and after hearing oral argument the remaining justices were equally divided. A short per curiam opinion was thus issued in 1975, allowing the Court of Claims's decision to stand.

=== Subsequent developments ===
Congress soon afterward passed the Copyright Act of 1976, the first major overhaul of copyright law since 1909. Fair use, which previously had been a matter for judicial determination, was formally codified as Section 107 (§107), with courts given four factors they were to assess to determine whether it was properly claimed: the purpose of the secondary work, the nature of the original work, the portion of the original work and the impact on commercial opportunities of the original work. Under those rules, meant to account for rapid improvements in information dissemination and storage technology, the Supreme Court found in 1984's Sony Corp. of America v. Universal City Studios, Inc. that television viewers recording shows on their VCRs to watch later were making fair use of the copyrighted programming. The following year, it provided some guidance for courts to apply the four fair use factors when it did so for the first time in Harper & Row v. Nation Enterprises, holding that the publication of leaked excerpts of a forthcoming book did not meet the test.

The Act of 1976 did not include any specific provisions aimed at the bulk-photocopying issue that had been at the heart of Williams & Wilkins. So, in response to a recommendation from Congress when it had been considering and developing the legislation, academic journal publishers had formed the Copyright Clearance Center (CCC) in 1977 to administer a licensing and royalty system. Its Transactional Reporting System, established the following year, required that all subscribing institutions provide a report listing all the copies they made, which some found cumbersome. In 1983 the CCC introduced another option, the Annual Authorization Service (AAS), which allowed unlimited copying for the payment of a blanket fee. That option proved popular with large companies, and by 1991 CCC had 500 subscribers between the two plans, earning it around $27 million a year.

In 1990 federal judge Pierre Leval of the Southern District of New York, which hears many copyright cases due to the many media companies in New York City, published an influential Harvard Law Review article about fair use. "Toward a Fair Use Standard", drew on cases from the Second Circuit Court of Appeals, which has appellate jurisdiction over the Southern District, and the Supreme Court in the years since 1978, when the 1976 Act took full effect, to discern what judges might be coming to a common understanding of in interpreting its fair-use provisions. In considering the first factor, the purpose of the secondary, allegedly infringing, work, which had more commonly been about whether that purpose was primarily commercial, Leval identified a concept he called "transformative use" derived from courts' decisions:

[It] must be productive and must employ the quoted matter in a different manner or for a different purpose than the original. A quotation of copyrighted material that either repackages or republishes the original is unlikely to pass the test ... If, on the other hand, the secondary use adds value to the original—if the quoted matter is used as raw material, transformed in the creation of new information, new aesthetics, new insights and understanding—this is the very type of activity that fair use doctrine intends to protect for the enrichment of society.

== Underlying dispute ==

Texaco (since merged with Chevron) was a for-profit corporation that refined and sold oil products of all kinds. It employed at the time of the suit between 400 and 500 scientists and engineers at six research centers in the U.S., one of which was located outside Beacon, New York, approximately 60 mi (97 km) north of Manhattan. At the center, like its others, it maintained an internal library that, in addition to its holdings, subscribed to many scientific journals, for the benefit of its researchers.

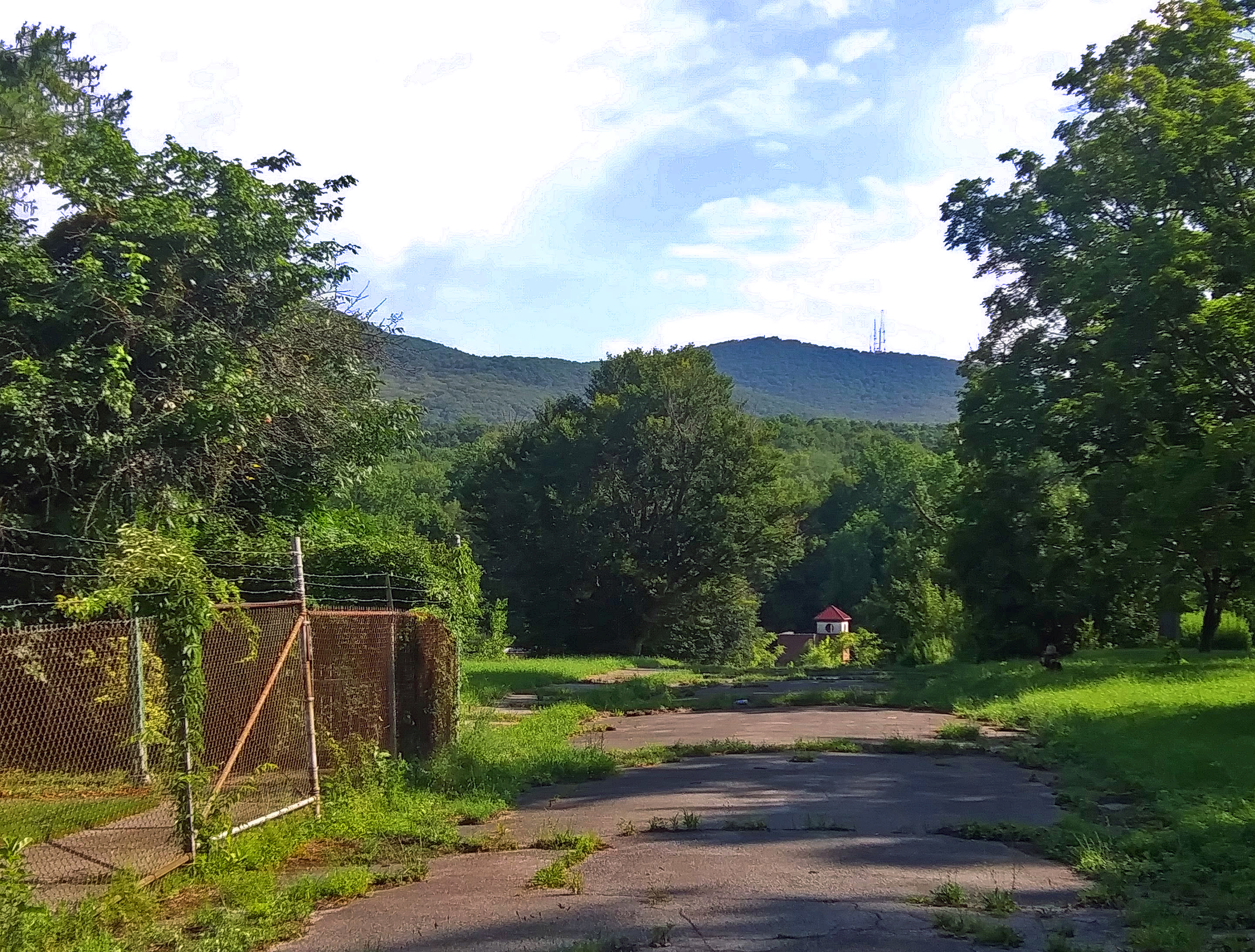
Former site of Texaco's Beacon Research Center, in 2023

Like other corporate internal libraries, Texaco's routinely supplied the company's researchers with photocopies of articles from the journals it subscribed to, both those that it believed might be of interest to them and those they specifically requested. Unlike other companies, including most other major oil companies, while Texaco had purchased a license under CCC's per-transaction plan, CCC and its member publishers noticed that the company was photocopying much less than comparable licensees. They concluded that Texaco was probably underreporting the total amount of copies it made. According to copyright lawyer William Patry, who represented the publishers in the early portions of the suit, the goal of the suit was to disincentivize companies from trying to save costs that way and encourage them to pay more for the blanket plan allowing them to copy as much as they wanted.

In 1985, six journal publishers that licensed photocopying through CCC, led by the American Geophysical Union, sued Texaco in the Southern District of New York, alleging copyright infringement. Texaco responded that per Williams & Wilkins the activity was protected under fair use.

Leval was assigned to hear the case. Although the plaintiffs at the time of filing did not offer any evidence of infringement, he allowed the case to proceed on the grounds it was likely that it had, an unusual decision. The evidentiary record reached 31 bound volumes. In 1992 Leval rejected Texaco's claim of fair use and held that it was infringing the journal's copyrights.

=== District court ===
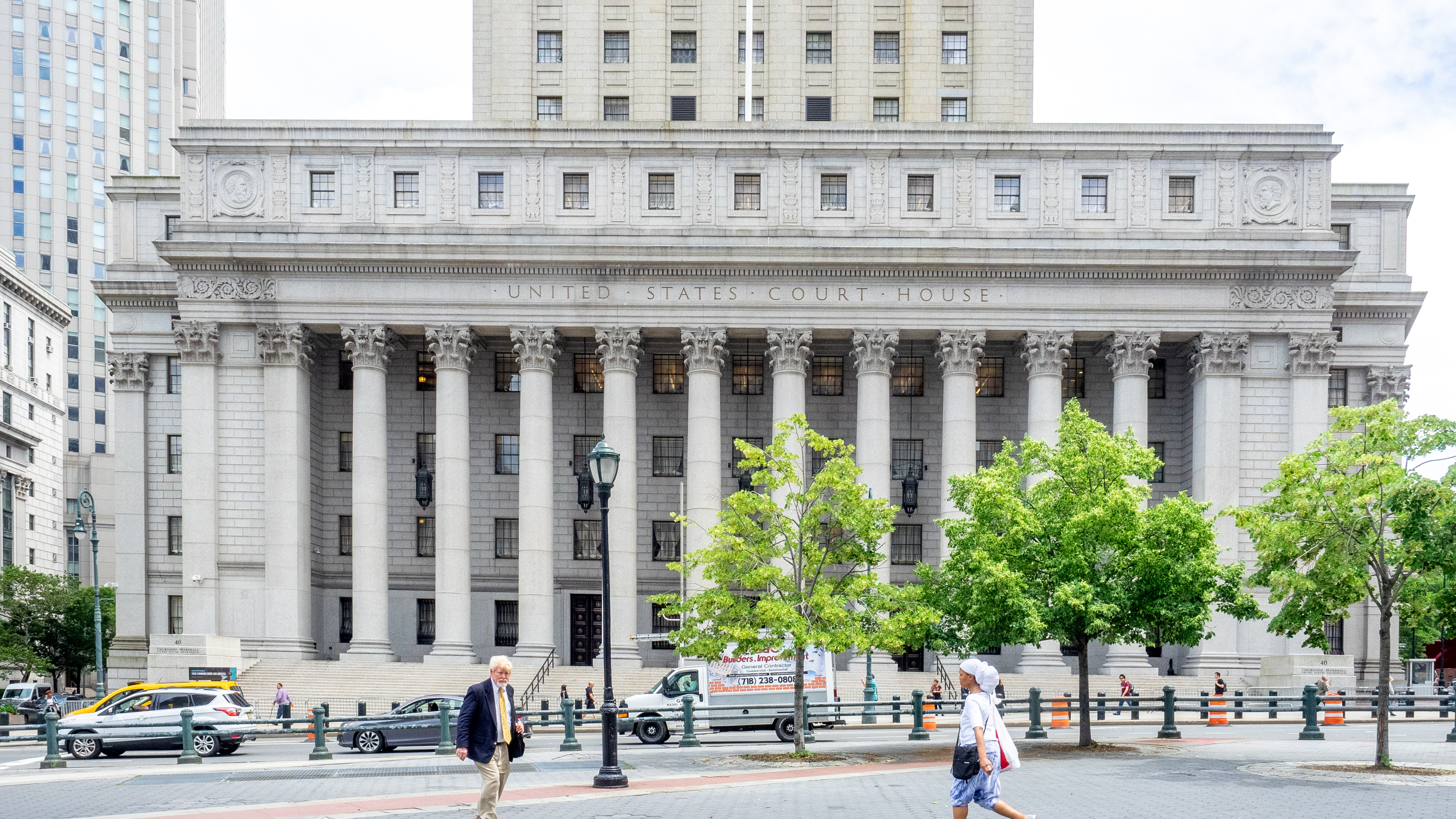
The Thurgood Marshall United States Courthouse in Manhattan, where the case was tried and heard on appeal

The parties stipulated that the fair-use question would be contested on eight pieces—four articles, two notes, and two letters to the editor—from the Journal of Catalysis, published at the time by Academic Press (now part of Elsevier). The research center library received three subscriptions to it, at a cost of almost $2,500 ($6,000 in current dollars) annually. (Note: The court noted that since 1972 the cost of the subscription had increased at a rate three times that of the Consumer Price Index.) They were kept in the file of one Texaco researcher, Donald Chickering, a PhD in chemical engineering who studied catalysis, the process by which small amounts of an additional chemical can speed up a reaction. His job consisted of designing and conducting experiments in the labs.

==== First factor ====
On the first factor, the purpose of the secondary work, Leval observed that while it was typically a question of commercial or non-commercial use courts had increasingly been allowing commercial reuse to be offset by a sufficiently transformative use. But Texaco's photocopying was neither, merely "superseding", since it:

simply makes mechanical photocopies of the entirety of relevant articles. Nor is the copy of the original employed as part of a larger whole, for some new purpose. The dimensions of the original and of the copy are identical. The principal purpose of Texaco's copies is to supersede the original and permit duplication, indeed, multiplication. A scientist can make a copy, to be read subsequently and kept for future reference, without preventing the circulation of the journal among co-workers. This kind of copying contributes nothing new or different to the original copyrighted work. It multiplies the number of copies.

Texaco argued that the photocopies were transformative in that they contributed to its scientists' research. Leval rejected that, since if it were true no copyright on scientific or scholarly research papers would survive. Another argument, that the photocopies were transformative as marginal notes could be written in them and they could be taken into the lab, where they might be damaged or destroyed by chemicals used in research, or to the scientists' homes, he agreed had "some merit", but only if Chickering was the only one reading Catalysis or copying from it. "Here, however, where three subscriptions to Catalysis are serving the needs of hundreds of scientists, the principal feature of the photocopying is its capacity to give numerous Texaco scientists their own copy based on Texaco's purchase of an original."

Some precedent supported another of Texaco's first-factor arguments, that the copies were a necessary way of transmitting accurate information, in this case the "formulas, graphs and tables that set forth the results of studies and experiments". But Leval noted that the company's scientists had copied not just those pages but the entire articles, often before even reading them. "Texaco's argument, although ingenious, simply does not fit the facts of the case."

Lastly, Texaco had likened its photocopying to that upheld as fair use in Williams & Wilkins, arguing that its scientists, too, were using the previously published research as building blocks for their own progress in advancing science. The company encouraged its scientists to publish their research in journals like those it photocopied from—pointing to 130 papers from them in the five years since the suit had been filed—and attend conferences; it also funded research at universities. But Leval said that even though the Texaco scientists were not reselling their copied articles, "their research is being conducted for commercial gain. Its purpose is to create new products and processes for Texaco that will improve its competitiveness and profitability." Thus the first factor of the fair-use test favored the publishers.

==== Second and third factors ====
Turning to the second factor, the nature of the copyrighted work, Leval found the facts favored Texaco. While, as he had observed in his Harvard Law Review article, copyright protection was especially important to the dissemination of scientific research due to the expense and risk involved. But at the same time precedent was more generous to fair-use claims for works that primarily communicated factual information, since facts themselves cannot be copyrighted. Leval was uncertain whether a previous Second Circuit holding stating that facts had generally received greater fair-use protection was "descriptive or prescriptive", but it was "unquestionably true that fair use is more easily found where the copyrighted material is of a factual nature rather than a fictional type." (Note: Patry noted that Leval's analysis of this, that "it may be nothing more than the logical consequence" of both the axiom that facts cannot be copyrighted and that quotation to communicate accurately reported facts has generally been more likely to be found a fair use, rare.) The articles primarily described the experimental methodology and gave results in quantifiable forms like charts and graphs, making them communications of fact.

On the third factor, the portion of the work used, Leval held for the plaintiffs since the researchers had copied entire articles. Texaco argued that these still did not amount to the entire work, since it was the publishers suing over their journals and not the individual authors. By that standard, the company's researchers had copied only 4 percent of the publishers' journals in the time period at issue. "This argument constitutes imaginative lawyering," Leval wrote, "but it does not prevail" as the authors had assigned copyright to the publishers in exchange for publication. While the publisher registered only each issue with the Copyright Office, that was only for convenience's sake and did not logically make each issue a single, discrete copyrighted work.

==== Fourth factor ====
As to the fourth factor, the impact on commercial opportunities for the copyrighted work, Texaco raised both factual and legal arguments against the publishers' contention that its photocopying had hurt their business. If the photocopying were held infringing, Texaco argued that it would not be able to replace the copies with additional copies of the journals, since its researchers specifically needed the photocopies. Leval found this "substantially correct" but that finding alone did not settle the question for Texaco.

Texaco pointed to the increase in the publishers' overall profits as evidence against market harm from its photocopying. While the Court of Claims had held that fact to benefit the government's argument in Williams & Wilkins, here Leval said it:

distorts the statutory standard. In order to prevail on the fourth factor, the copyright owner is not required to demonstrate that it has been reduced to poverty by the defendant's copying ... The fact that the copyright owner is realizing rich profits from the exploitation of its copyrights despite the unauthorized copying has no logical tendency to prove that the secondary user's copying is not diminishing those profits. If the copyright owner would be receiving significantly higher revenue but for the defendant's uncompensated copying, the standard is satisfied, regardless of revenues already being received.

The copyright owner was only required to prove potential harm, in any event, Leval noted.

On the legal front, Texaco argued that courts should not overemphasize the fourth factor. Since, the company said, there are some fair uses where the argument from the first three factors is strong enough, and the public need they address great, that to reject fair use on the ground of market harm would deny the public the benefit and go against the principles of fair use. Leval agreed: "There is considerable force in Texaco's argument that this should not be the law ... Its arguments express a correct understanding of the law of fair use. I do not think the Supreme Court would disagree ..."

But the company could not make that argument in the instant case, Leval continued. "This is not a case where hypothetical loss of revenue arguably converts fair use to infringement", he wrote. "Here, without reaching the fourth factor, analysis of the other considerations strongly favors the plaintiffs' contention that Texaco's copying infringes the publishers' copyrights. The fourth factor merely confirms that conclusion." On that basis he held the publishers had demonstrated market harm, especially since they were willing to sell Texaco a license under either of the CCC plans, and Texaco did not want to buy one it could still order tear sheets from a third-party service or have it do the photocopying.

==== Equitable factors ====
Courts may consider equitable factors besides the four related to the two works when assessing a fair-use defense, and Texaco made some arguments in that area. First, it likened the case to both Williams & Wilkins and Sony, claiming they were similar enough as to not require separate evaluation. Leval rejected that, observing that those two cases "do not purport to define the heartland of fair use. To the contrary, they present themselves as defining its remote extremities."

While Sony had also involved mechanically created near-perfect copies of entire works, Leval distinguished the two cases in that VCR owners created single copies of programs for their own personal reuse, while Texaco's photocopies were meant "to assist Texaco in its pursuit of scientific research that is done to bring it competitive commercial advantage." Anticipating that holding, Texaco had attempted to draw a closer comparison, in that "having purchased subscriptions to Catalysis, it has then been invited by the publisher to have each of its scientists read Catalysis free of any additional charge and is therefore in a position comparable to the Sony home timeshifter when it permits its scientists to make photocopies to facilitate such reading."

"The argument has some force", Leval wrote, noting that Texaco was in a better position to make it for having used its own library than it would have been if its researchers made their own copies at public libraries. But it still failed, as "Texaco uses three subscriptions to Catalysis to furnish copies to hundreds of scientists. That is a far cry from the single user's one-time viewing hypothesized in Sony."

Nor, Leval wrote, did Williams & Wilkins help the company's case. "Taking its own holding at face value, it strongly suggests that Texaco's use should be considered infringing", he said. Not only had it been decided before the 1976 Copyright Act codified fair use and allowed for the kind of copying in the instant case, the copying for government agencies in Williams & Wilkins was specifically found to be "devoted solely to scientific progress, untainted by any commercial gain, [while] here it is commercial profit that is the hallmark of the enterprise."

The Court of Claims had also cited the difficulty of managing the licensing of so many photocopies from different sources, something the CCC had been established to deal with in the interim, Leval noted. "[P]rivate cooperative ingenuity has found practical solutions to what had seemed unsurmountable problems." While Leval again conceded to Texaco a minor point, that photocopying had become "reasonable and customary" use that an author could expect and not object to, "[t]hose arguments depend, however, on the absence of a convenient, reasonable licensing system", which was no longer the case.

Leval found Texaco's next argument, that the AAS plan that many CCC users had favored was irrelevant because some of the articles Chickering copied predated its establishment, "perversely struthian". The company had argued that the lukewarm corporate response to the TRS which was the only CCC option available at the time of the earliest articles Chickering had copied showed it was indeed too burdensome (Note: In a footnote, Leval noted that "Law firms routinely keep a log of all photocopying done and bill clients for such copying on a per-page basis to a specific client-matter code. The recording and reporting requirements of the TRS are scarcely more burdensome.") to have been a realistic alternative, but "[t]his evidence does not prove as much as Texaco contends. The fact that members of the user community negotiated for something more advantageous by no means proves that the TRS was too burdensome to be practical", Leval wrote.

Texaco raised some other equitable questions that Leval found "superficially seductive but, in the end, unpersuasive." It had attacked the publishers as "greedy abusers who obtain their merchandise for free, sell it at a high profit and finally seek to stifle scientific research by extorting tribute for photocopying" and noted that many of the authors of the papers supported Texaco's liberal construction of fair use as applied to photocopying. "Virtually every segment of this construct is flawed, illogical and contrary to the principle on which the copyright law is founded", Leval responded.

While the authors were not financially compensated directly for their work, publication did improve their academic and professional reputations, which "translates itself into remuneration ... through growth of prestige and a consequent ability to command greater salaries or more prestigious and powerful positions", wrote Leval. The authors' position on photocopying was irrelevant since they had surrendered copyright on their papers in order to get them published, and therefore they were likely to support any policy that extended the reach of their work, even at the expense of royalty payments. "But the authors have not risked their capital to achieve dissemination. The publishers have."

And profit, Leval noted, was essential to copyright working for the public good.

The copyright law celebrates the profit motive, recognizing that the incentive to profit from the exploitation of copyrights will redound to the public benefit by resulting in the proliferation of knowledge ... The profit motive is the engine that ensures the progress of science. The principle is admirably demonstrated by the facts of this case. Through its ability to profit from its exclusive rights over the works assigned to it, Academic Press has expanded its range so that it publishes 105 scientific, medical and technical journals. The result is the progress of science; the means is the profit motive, which is underwritten by the law of copyright.

So not only was Texaco's outrage legally irrelevant, it was "an odd argument, furthermore, to be made by an oil company that reported over $2.4 billion net income for fiscal 1989 on revenues of over $32 billion", Leval observed in a footnote.

=== Appeals court ===
While the decision would not normally be appealable, Leval granted Texaco the right to do several months later under a provision of federal law allowing that waiver, since it involved a "controlling question of law", there was reasonable room for a difference of opinion, and allowing an appeal would bring the litigation to an end if the plaintiffs prevailed there, too; the parties welcomed this and said they would begin settlement talks in that instance. Otherwise, "the court will be obliged to face voluminous unnecessary litigation of the claims of 84 (Note: Many had joined the suit since it was filed.) plaintiffs, including innumerable technical defenses."

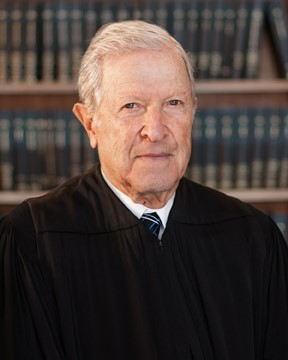
Judge Newman, in 2016

The Second Circuit Court of Appeals took the case. Southern District judge Charles E. Stewart Jr., sitting by designation, was empaneled to hear it along with Ralph K. Winter Jr. and Dennis Jacobs. Oral arguments were held in 1993; after which Stewart recused himself due to illness (Note: He died on the same day the decision was first announced.) and was replaced by Jon O. Newman, the circuit's chief judge. In late 1994, over a year later, a divided court affirmed Leval's ruling while criticizing some aspects of it. Newman wrote the majority opinion, joined by Winter, while Jacobs dissented.

Since the district court decision, the Supreme Court had decided Campbell v. Acuff-Rose Music, Inc., a copyright case in which it recognized transformative use for the first time, holding that parody was protected under that concept. Newman wrote that panel had incorporated that case's holdings, which had affected some of its interpretations even though it affirmed Leval's decision.

When recapitulating the dispute, Newman responded to many amici briefs addressing the broader issues around fair use in bulk photocopying in academia, making clear that the court was deciding the narrow issue before it "[O]ur opinion does not decide the case that would arise if Chickering were a professor or an independent scientist engaged in copying and creating files for independent research, as opposed to being employed by an institution in the pursuit of his research on the institution's behalf". Newman did express some concern over "whether the fair use analysis that has developed with respect to works of authorship alleged to use portions of copyrighted material is precisely applicable to copies produced by mechanical means" and complained that Congress had offered little guidance in interpreting fair use in that area. He found Sony to be the best applicable precedent.

==== First factor ====
After laying out the materials at issue (the articles in Chickering's file) and what the burden of proof was, Newman turned to the fair-use factors. Texaco had argued three errors in Leval's first-factor analysis: that he had confused the user and the use in determining Texaco's copying to be fundamentally commercial, that he had put too much emphasis on transformative use, and that the photocopying was a "reasonable and customary" use of the copyrighted articles.

While Newman called Leval's analysis of the commercial-use question "insightful", he agreed the district judge had placed "undue emphasis" on Texaco's status as a for-profit company. "Since many, if not most, secondary users seek at least some measure of commercial gain from their use, unduly emphasizing the commercial motivation of a copier will lead to an overly restrictive view of fair use", he observed. He noted that Campbell, recently decided, had replaced the presumption against fairness for commercial reuse affirmed in Sony with the parallel transformative-use analysis. Leval, Newman, said, had not recognized that the actual act of photocopying was not directly commercial. "Rather, Texaco's photocopying served, at most, to facilitate Chickering's research, which in turn might have led to the development of new products and technology that could have improved Texaco's commercial performance," products and technology that might serve to benefit the public as a whole, he added.

But it was still relevant that Texaco was a commercial enterprise. While he agreed that Texaco had raised a valid point, "it is overly simplistic to suggest that the 'purpose and character of the use' can be fully discerned without considering the nature and objectives of the user", Newman reiterated. Precedents and legal commentary suggested that when there was both public and private benefit from secondary use, whether it was fair depended on how much accrued to the former interest. "[W]e can confidently conclude that Texaco reaps at least some indirect economic advantage from its photocopying", said Newman. "Conceptualized in this way, it is not obvious why it is fair for Texaco to avoid having to pay at least some price to copyright holders for the right to photocopy the original articles."

On the transformative-use issue, Newman explained its role in the first-factor analysis:

The "transformative use" concept is pertinent to a court's investigation under the first factor because it assesses the value generated by the secondary use and the means by which such value is generated. To the extent that the secondary use involves merely an untransformed duplication, the value generated by the secondary use is little or nothing more than the value that inheres in the original. Rather than making some contribution of new intellectual value and thereby fostering the advancement of the arts and sciences, an untransformed copy is likely to be used simply for the same intrinsic purpose as the original, thereby providing limited justification for a finding of fair use.

Texaco reiterated its arguments that the photocopies allowed the articles to be used in the laboratory was sufficiently transformative. But this "merely transforms the material object embodying the intangible article that is the copyrighted original work", Newman wrote. He allowed that, again, Texaco's argument was not without value, as the direct copy was an improvement over the notes Chickering might have taken in the past. "Nevertheless, whatever independent value derives from the more usable format of the photocopy does not mean that every instance of photocopying wins on the first factor. In this case, the predominant archival purpose of the copying tips the first factor against the copier, despite the benefit of a more usable format."

Newman agreed with Leval that the "reasonable and customary use" claim that had been considered in Williams & Wilkins could no longer be made since the cooperative licensing agreements contemplated there were now a reality. "On balance," he concluded, "we agree with the District Court that the first factor favors the publishers, primarily because the dominant purpose of the use is a systematic institutional policy of multiplying the available number of copies of pertinent copyrighted articles by circulating the journals among employed scientists for them to make copies, thereby serving the same purpose for which additional subscriptions are normally sold, or, as will be discussed, for which photocopying licenses may be obtained."

==== Second factor ====
On the second factor, the nature of the copyrighted work, the publishers appealed Leval's finding for Texaco. The publishers had contrasted his finding that the journal articles were purely factual communications by noting his statements about the importance of copyright law in protecting their work, and arguing that the articles were in fact creative works. Newman found the first argument unimpressive: "[N]early every category of copyrightable works could plausibly assert that broad copyright protection was essential to the continued vitality of that category of works." As for the second, Newman agreed that Leval that they were "manifestly factual" and that the trial judge had been correct on this factor.

==== Third factor ====
Texaco raised three arguments against Leval's finding that the third factor, the portion used, weighed in the publishers' favor: it was irrelevant where no resale or redistribution took place after the copying, its earlier argument that the articles should count only against the entire journal they were in and that therefore they were minor, and that Sony and Williams & Wilkins had held that in some circumstances a copy of the entire work can still be fair use. Newman reiterated Leval's conclusions as to the latter two, noting that Williams & Wilkins had also treated the articles at issue as separate works and Sony had set a high bar to cross for that holding. On the first, "we are sensitive to Texaco's claim that the third factor serves merely as a proxy for determining whether a secondary use significantly interferes with demand for the original ... [but] we think this factor serves a further end that advances the fair use analysis" since it facilitated greater insight into understanding the copier's purpose in the first-factor test, Newman wrote. Texaco's decision to copy entire articles "weakens its assertion that the overriding purpose and character of its use was to enable the immediate use of the article in the laboratory and strengthens our view that the predominant purpose and character of the use was to establish a personal library of pertinent articles for Chickering." Newman again affirmed Leval.

==== Fourth factor ====
Newman wrote at length in considering the fourth-factor analysis, the effect of the copying on the market for the original work. He began by noting that Campbell had made this aspect of the analysis less important than before, when it had been "the single most important element of fair use", as the Supreme Court had characterized it in Harper & Row. Campbell had changed that, instructing courts to weigh all four factors together.

This analysis was complicated by the fact that while there was a market for the journals, there was no discernible market for the individual articles that had been copied, making it hard to put a value on them. Leval had approached the inquiry in terms of the effect on subscriptions, but Newman found this "of somewhat limited significance". The publishers might indeed have lost a few journal subscriptions, but as neither side had offered much in evidence either way, Newman did not see this area as offering much to help either side.

Newman found stronger ground when considering the question in terms of the loss of photocopying licensing revenue. Leval had held this to favor the publishers, which Texaco said was error because it assumed that the publishers were entitled to that revenue, the question before the court. Newman allowed that case law recognized some limitations on this issue, such as a market the original author cannot enter or has shown no interest in, but they did not apply here because the publishers, since Williams & Wilkins, had created the CCC and its licensing plans. Texaco had argued that it did not follow that making it easier to pay affected the fair use evaluation, but Newman said that was logical. Responding to a criticism in the dissent, he wrote "[t]he vice of circular reasoning arises only if the availability of payment is conclusive against fair use."

Newman lastly found indirect evidence that Congress anticipated publishers being able to collect licensing fees for the photocopying of their work by libraries. A section of the 1976 Copyright Act limited libraries' abilities to do that, for one thing. "Though this section states that it does not in any way affect the right of fair use," Newman observed, "the very fact that Congress restricted the rights of libraries to make copies implicitly suggests that Congress views journal publishers as possessing the right to restrict photocopying, or at least the right to demand a licensing royalty from nonpublic institutions that engage in photocopying." Like Leval, he also noted the suggestions for the establishment of something like the CCC in the committee reports that predated the Copyright Act.

The lost licensing revenue, Newman said, was the primary reason the court agreed with Leval that the publishers had prevailed on the fourth factor. With two of the other factors also going their way, the majority affirmed Leval's conclusion that Texaco's copying was not fair use and thus infringement.

=== Amendments of decision ===
The Second Circuit issued its opinion in October 1994. It amended it twice.

Two months later, it denied Texaco's petition for rehearing. Most of the amendments made at that time were to its analysis of the fourth factor, the impact on commercial opportunities for the original work. One of those changes was to specify more clearly the court's belief that in Campbell the Supreme Court had retreated from its earlier instruction (in Harper & Row) that the fourth factor was to be given the most importance.

In July 1995, it again amended the ruling. The new language included the preambulatory language clarifying that the broader issue of academic and institutional photocopying was not being decided, and that Chickering's eight copies were being judged not by themselves but as a representative sample of all the copying done by Texaco's scientists.

=== Dissent ===
Jacobs agreed with Newman and Winter's findings on the second and third factors. He wrote at length on why he believed the majority had misread the first and fourth factors, which he believed favored Texaco. "[T]he purpose and character of Dr. Chickering's use is integral to transformative and productive ends of scientific research", Jacobs said. "As to the fourth factor: the adverse effect of Dr. Chickering's use upon the potential market for the work, or upon its value, is illusory."

Granting the majority its factual finding that Chickering had used the articles to inform his research, Jacobs pointed to the preamble of the statute governing fair use, which specifically mentioned "research" as a valid fair use of copyrighted material. The Second Circuit had, a few years earlier, held that uses within the meaning of that preamble had a strong presumption of fair use, While that presumption came from cases about quotations from private communications in biographies, Jacobs saw no difference between that and the copies made for Chickering, since he believed the majority had seen the scientist's purpose too narrowly in characterizing his copying as "archival" since he filed them away and had not taken them into the lab or otherwise used them in his research at the time of the suit.

[T]he research function is far broader than the majority opinion and the district court opinion contemplate ... Replication of laboratory experiments is of course a form of scientific research, but it is not the whole or main part of it. Often, a researcher needs to know what others have thought and done in order to steer clear of repetition and dead ends, to evaluate theories and hypotheses for possible theoretical development or commercial application, to give credit to others, and much else. None of this requires a scientist to enter a laboratory ... Dr. Chickering's personal file contains articles available for reference to assist the memory, curiosity and ongoing inquiries of a single researcher. As such, it is part of a transformative process of scientific research that has a long history ... In my view, it is no overstatement to call this process research. I have difficulty thinking of anything else to call it. (Note: "[T]he concept of a 'transformative' use would be extended beyond recognition if it was applied to Chickering's copying simply because he acted in the course of doing research", Newman replied. "The purposes illustrated by the categories listed in section 107 refer primarily to the work of authorship alleged to be a fair use, not to the activity in which the alleged infringer is engaged. Texaco cannot gain fair use insulation for Chickering's archival photocopying of articles (or books) simply because such copying is done by a company doing research.")

Jacobs also argued that the majority had given short shrift to the "reasonable and customary" aspect of the analysis; the copying of scholarly articles had been both since photocopiers had been invented. It remained so despite the development of the CCC after Williams & Wilkins. Jacobs saw that as having no legal effect: "I do not agree at all that a reasonable and customary use becomes unfair when the copyright holder develops a way to exact an additional price for the same product." What Chickering actually did was "simply a technologically assisted form of note-taking." It did not matter, in that context, that he filed them; what did matter was that he was not reselling or redistributing them.

Chickering's notes were "important raw material in the synthesis of new ideas." Jacobs concluded. "Accordingly, I find the nature and purpose of the use to be fully transformative." He also discounted the institutional character of Texaco that the majority had found significant since Chickering, like the other scientists, controlled what articles the company library copied through their requests. (Note: In response, the majority noted that if Chickering and his colleagues had been having books photocopied rather than journal articles, that would have been unambiguously seen as archival. "An individual copies for archival purposes even if the resulting archive remains in a private office", Newman wrote. "When a corporation invites such archival copying by circulating items likely to be worth copying (whether articles or entire books), any distinction between individual and institutional archiving loses all significance.")

Turning to the fourth factor, Jacobs agreed with the majority that the publishers had not established much of a loss from additional subscriptions Texaco might have purchased had it not been able to photocopy without paying license fees. Leval had found, he noted, that Texaco would not necessarily purchase additional subscriptions if it could not photocopy, making it hard to quantify the loss to publishers from the copying. Further, since the institutional subscription fee for Catalysis was double the individual rate, he suggested that publishers had assumed that the articles within would be copied and shared to some degree by readers at institutions and priced the subscription accordingly.

Jacobs parted company with the majority on the issue of lost photocopying license fees. The problem was, he insisted, circular: "[T]he market will not crystallize unless courts reject the fair use argument that Texaco presents; but, under the statutory test, we cannot declare a use to be an infringement unless (assuming other factors also weigh in favor of the secondary user) there is a market to be harmed." Since "there is no normal market in photocopy licenses, and no real consensus among publishers that there ought to be one", he saw the fourth factor as favoring Texaco.

In support of that assertion, Jacobs pointed to facts from the record that the parties had stipulated to: that only 30 percent of academic journal publishers were covered by a CCC license, (Note: A CCC spokesman told a law student writing an article about the case that that number was misleading, as that 30 percent was the amount of publishers, not journals, its plans covered. Even so, that came to 9,200 separate publishers, and while that did not include every work the CCC researched the market by surveying users to identify the journals they were most likely to copy articles from. Based on that, it estimated that its plans covered 75–85 percent of the works most likely to be photocopied.) that some CCC member publishers did not offer licensing to all their journal through it, and that not all the articles in covered journals were copyrighted (Note: Those written by scientists working for the federal government are in the public domain.) Some large publishers, such as Bell Labs, were not members of the CCC at all. As a result of this fragmentation, it was necessary to determine the copyright status of every article copied prior to copying, and even then, an executive at Springer-Verlag had testified, it was "almost impossible to tell". The AAS's blanket license only eliminated some of the bureaucratic logging requirements, not the copyright confusion.

"It is hard to escape the conclusion that the existence of the CCC—or the perception that the CCC and other schemes for collecting license fees are or may become 'administratively tolerable'—is the chief support for the idea that photocopying scholarly articles is unfair in the first place", Jacobs observed. He called the majority's position that a previously fair use becomes less so once there is a licensing mechanism in place "sensible only to a point" since he believed it would not apply to parody or the use of quotations in a biography even if one existed.

Jacobs reviewed the equitable-factors analysis again with an eye towards the ultimate goal of copyright: public good. For him it mattered that the authors of the journal articles had surrendered their copyrights, and with them any claim to royalties, to the publishers in order to assure maximum distribution and dissemination of their ideas. Jacobs saw this as being "of great importance: it means that, so long as the copyright system assures sufficient revenue to print and distribute scientific journals, the level of copyright revenue is not among the incentives that drive the authors to the creative acts that the copyright laws are intended to foster." In dismissing the author's interests once they had assigned copyright, Leval and the majority had again framed the issue too narrowly, since "equitable considerations under the copyright law justify an inquiry into the incentives for creating the work."

The publishers had not argued that the revenue from the CCC had led directly to more journals being published, Jacobs wrote, citing statistics that showed the total amount of journals published doubled every 10–15 years. "Clearly, the incentives currently in place for journal publishing assure a fair return." The court should have considered the incentives from the scientists' perspective, Jacobs argued, under which the process of exchanging ideas would now be more bureaucratically encumbered. (Note: "[T]he claim that lawyers need to be stationed at copy machines", Newman wrote in response, "is belied by the ease with which music royalties have been collected and distributed for performances at thousands of cabarets, without the attendance of intellectual property lawyers in any capacity other than as customers.") "Nowhere in the case law is there support for the proposition that the monopoly granted by copyright is designed to ensure the holder a maximum economic return; rather, the law's purpose is to balance competing interests—assuring the author a fair return, while permitting creative uses that build upon the author's work", he concluded, saying that he considered Chickering's copying fair use.

== Aftermath ==
Texaco petitioned the Second Circuit for a rehearing en banc and the Supreme Court for certiorari to hear the case, but put both of them on hold pending settlement talks with the publishers. In 1995 it announced that it would both pay a seven-figure settlement (the exact amount was confidential) to the CCC and retroactive license fees.

The CCC accomplished its goal of clearing up the legal uncertainties around the issue of institutional bulk photocopying through the lawsuit to encourage more companies to subscribe. The 510 subscribers, most to the AAS, it had in 1990 grew to 3,500 AAS subscribers in 1993, after Leval's ruling. By 2000 it had 10,000, a level that it remained at through 2007 (although without having grown its member author and publisher base to the same extent).

== Subsequent jurisprudence ==
Other courts have relied on Texaco to support the proposition that with Campbell, the Supreme Court, without saying so, retreated from its earlier insistence on the primacy of the fourth factor. In Princeton University Press v. Michigan Document Services, Inc., a 1996 case also involving bulk photocopying, the Sixth Circuit allowed that the Supreme Court's denial of cert in Texaco might constitute an endorsement of this holding even as it announced it still considered the fourth factor first among equals.

Texaco has guided other courts hearing similar cases covering bulk photocopying for possibly social useful ends, even with a clear profit. Both the majority and dissents in Michigan Document, heard en banc after the original appellate panel voted unanimously to do so following its reversal of the district court's finding that the defendant's claim to fair use in creating document packs for university courses was not fair use, cited the case. Judge David A. Nelson's majority opinion accepts Newman's rejection of the circularity argument regarding the licensing-fee market, while Judge James L. Ryan accepted it in that case because he believed the plaintiff publishers could not enter that market.

In 2012 the Northern District of Georgia considered Cambridge University Press v. Becker, a case involving academic photocopying by Georgia State University, which allowed digitized portions of works to be included in online coursepacks for students, the issue the Second Circuit had said it was not deciding in Texaco. The plaintiff publishers had, in arguing the first factor favored them, likened the case to Texaco and Michigan Document, but Judge Orinda D. Evans distinguished those cases as involving copying purely for commercial gain whereas in the instant case it was a nonprofit public university doing the copying. Since the university also had a relationship with the CCC, she agreed that the lost licensing revenues decided the fourth factor in the publishers' favor. Evans agreed that there was circular reasoning involved but found "no ideal solution" to the problem beyond evaluating all the factors independently, without regard to circularity. (Note: Unlike Texaco, Becker was decided separately for each additional work alleged to have been infringed, as while Evans had held the first and second factors favored the university conditions she put on the third and fourth factors meant those were to be considered differently for each work. In a footnote, she called Texaco "unsatisfying" since the Second Circuit's opinion did not explain in detail why the stipulations chose Chickering's eight articles as the works at issue.)

In 2013 the American Institute of Physics invoked Texaco in bringing suit (again with other publishers as plaintiffs) against two law firms, one in Minneapolis and the other in Dallas, that they accused of similarly infringing unlicensed duplication of articles. Both the District of Minnesota and the Northern District of Texas rejected the comparison. The defendant firms practiced patent law, and printed the articles out not for archival research purposes, but to submit with clients' prosecutions as evidence of relevant prior art.

"The Court finds Texaco inapplicable here," wrote Judge Barbara M.G. Lynn when analyzing the fourth factor in the Texas case, "where the monetary gain received by the defendants for reading an article is generated from the use of the attorneys' own time and not the content of the article itself." The magistrate judge who heard the Minnesota case held in the first-factor analysis that the printing and copying was, unlike Texaco's, a transformative use: "This case is not Texaco ... the evidentiary character of Schwegman's copying differentiates the firm's use of the articles from the articles' original purpose."

== Analysis and commentary ==
Scholarly critics of Texaco reiterated Jacobs' arguments, primarily on the circularity and intermediate copying issues, as well as adding some of their own. Nicole Cásarez of the University of St. Thomas found the Second Circuit's approach too focused on economic factors at the expense of the broader goal of copyright protection, leaving some questions unsatisfactorily answered or unaddressed. The court should have, she wrote, followed the example of the Ninth Circuit in Sega v. Accolade, where copied computer code served a transitory purpose in reverse engineering that bypassed the petitioner's licensing system to create games that could be played on its platform. "[P]hotocopying by itself", she wrote, "never creates a new work of authorship, but rather only assists in its creation."

Newman's response to Jacobs' invocation of §107's preamble misread the statute, Cásarez continued: "[Its] words ... explicitly pertain to activities and not to works of authorship; otherwise, Congress would have referred to 'news articles' and 'scientific treatises' rather than 'news reporting' and 'research.'" Through that misreading, she alleged, the court had allowed the transformative use issue to be decided by economic considerations that properly remained part of the fourth-factor analysis. Like Jacobs, Cásarez felt that the "purpose and character of the use" should be evaluated in light of the possible ultimate benefit to the public, not the user.

Likewise, Cásarez argued that the court's analysis of the third and fourth factors had been driven by purely commercial considerations, as had the first factor. Texaco's argument that the publishers sold the individual articles only bundled with others in journals did should have been given greater consideration, since the main purpose of the third-factor analysis is to guide the consideration of market impact, she wrote, and "[t]herefore, it seems manifestly unfair to ignore whether the copyrighted work was separately marketed as opposed to being available for purchase only within the collective work." It was not relevant whether Texaco had purchased a license, since by doing so it was assumed to have already purchased the original work. Further, "[it] should have recognized that although Dr. Chickering copied the complete articles as a preliminary step in his research, ultimately he would use very little of the original copyrighted works." The court was correct that the third factor favored the publishers, but should have assigned that less importance, Cásarez concluded.

Cásarez also wrote that the majority had gotten the distinction it drew between Sony and the instant case wrong. The customers recording TV shows to watch them later, at more opportune times were likely to record them only once and then later tape over them, while researchers kept articles they had photocopied, even after drawing on them for research, until they needed to clear space in their files. Cásarez called it "apples and oranges" to suggest that the hundreds of copies made by Texaco constituted greater potential infringement than the many home copies of previously broadcast programs; it was, to her, the other way around as millions of VCR users making one copy amounted to far more copies (which neither party resold). She also noted that the viewers taping programs had gotten them for free while Texaco had already paid for its subscriptions.

To Cásarez, the case called for Congress to supplement fair use with a personal-use exemption. She noted that the language of the amended decision explicitly excludes such use from its scope, and asked "does (or should) personal copying of copyrighted material enjoy favored status under the copyright law, either as a separate exemption or as part of fair use?; and if so, (2) under what circumstances does (or should) the personal use exemption apply?" Decisions like Texaco, Cásarez argued, resulted from the relative silence of the law on these questions, which she attributed to Congress having primarily consulted with publishers and other industry groups when drafting the 1976 Act. "If [it] is read to require an individual user to purchase a license or pay a royalty before he or she can duplicate a copyrighted article for personal use, then the copyright law is being applied not to enhance but rather to inhibit that user's ability to learn", she wrote. A personal-use exemption would deal with that better than fair use, which Cásarez said has been judged and codified with commercial reuse in mind.

In the Georgia Law Review, Karen Still echoed many of Cásarez's concerns, particularly regarding the first and fourth factors, calling the court's analysis "overbroad and outcome-oriented", saying it applied the preamble to §107 more narrowly than Congress intended and misinterpreted Williams & Wilkins on the "reasonable and customary" nature of bulk photocopying. She further charged that Texaco also unconstitutionally expanded the publishers' monopoly on copyright, falsely treating its mandate as favoring profit for publishers over the public good, and also intruded on the powers of the legislative branch by effectively mandating compulsory licensing even as it noted that doing so would properly be Congress's task.

Looking back on Texaco in 2007, commentators at William & Mary focused on decisions that cited both it and Campbell to survey the state of courts' understanding of those precedents in ruling on fair use. The authors agreed with Jacobs and other critics that the circularity of the market analysis tended to favor plaintiffs in fourth-factor analyses, calling it the "can-pay/should-pay" doctrine, since if the court found that the slightest market existed, it invariably found market impact in the alleged infringement. (Note: For instance, in another opinion by Judge Newman, an artist's market for posters of one of her works was held to have been impacted when a TV show used a reproduction of that work as background decoration in several scenes, where it was visible for a total of 30 seconds; the court did not distinguish the market for the posters from the market for set decorations. Leval, by then elevated to the Second Circuit, wrote another opinion several years later in which a clothing retailer's unlicensed use of a designer's purely decorative eyewear in one of its advertisements was found infringing because he had on one occasion licensed their use.) This ended in 2006 with Bill Graham Archives v. Dorling Kindersley, Ltd. where the plaintiff had asserted market harm over unlicensed reproductions of posters and tickets to past Grateful Dead concerts used in the defendant's history of the band. The court had held the reuse transformative since the images were reduced in size and used to recount the band's history rather than as artistic works, distinguishing the case from Texaco where there was no transformation and holding that the archives could not pre-empt markets for transformative derivative works merely by entering them as they could have with non-transformative works.,
