= Agro Food Industry Hi Tech =

- Discipline: Nutraceuticals, functional foods
- Language: English
- Edited by: Silvana Maini

Publication details
- History: 1990-present
- Publisher: Tekno Scienze Publisher
- Frequency: Bimonthly
- Impact factor: 0.202 (2015)

Standard abbreviations
- ISO 4: Agro Food Ind. Hi Tech

Indexing
- CODEN: AIHTEI
- ISSN: 1722-6996 (print); 2035-4606 (web)
- OCLC no.: 848621965

Links
- Journal homepage; Online access; Online archive

Agro Food Industry Hi Tech is a bimonthly peer-reviewed scientific journal published by Tekno Scienze Publisher, covering nutraceuticals and functional foods. It was established in 1990 and the editor-in-chief is Silvana Maini.

== Abstracting and indexing ==
The journal is abstracted and indexed in Copyright Clearance Center, Chemical Abstracts, Science Citation Index Expanded, and Scopus. According to the Journal Citation Reports, the journal has a 2015 impact factor of 0.202.
