= Journal of Catalysis =

- Discipline: Catalysis
- Language: English
- Edited by: Johannes A. Lercher

Publication details
- History: 1962-present
- Publisher: Elsevier
- Frequency: Monthly
- Impact factor: 8.047 (2021)

Standard abbreviations
- ISO 4: J. Catal.

Indexing
- CODEN: JCTLA5
- ISSN: 0021-9517 (print); 1090-2694 (web)
- LCCN: 64005979
- OCLC no.: 1783064

Links
- Journal homepage; Online access

The Journal of Catalysis is a monthly peer-reviewed scientific journal covering research on all aspects of heterogeneous and homogeneous catalysis. It is published by Elsevier and it was established in 1962 by Jan Hendrik de Boer and P. W. Selwood. The current editor-in-chief is Johannes A. Lercher (Technical University of Munich). Other members of the editorial board include Bert Weckhuysen and Joachim Sauer. Former editors-in-chief have been F. S. Stone, W. K. Hall, G. L. Haller, W. N. Delgass, and E. Iglesia.

According to the Journal Citation Reports, the journal has a 2021 impact factor of 8.047.

== Role in copyright lawsuit ==
In the mid-1980s, photocopies of eight selections from the journal (four articles, two notes, and two letters to the editor) were at the center of American Geophysical Union v. Texaco, Inc., a key case in American copyright law. They were in the files of Donald Chickering, a chemical engineer working at Texaco's research center outside Beacon, New York, United States, made by the research center's internal library. Academic Press, the journal's then-publisher, the American Geophysical Union and several other publishers whose journals Texaco subscribed to, alleged that the company's bulk photocopying of articles they published, without paying them sufficient licensing royalties through the Copyright Clearance Center, was copyright infringement.

Texaco claimed as its primary defense fair use, citing an earlier case where similar photocopying of journal articles by two federal government research centers was held to be non-infringing. One aspect of that defense was transformative use, a relatively new concept at the time, derived from Harvard Law Review article two years earlier by Pierre Leval, a federal judge who was assigned to hear the case. Texaco argued, among other things, that the photocopies were transformative use since they enabled its scientists to take the articles into their labs where they might get damaged during experiments, something they would not do with the originals in the journal. Leval rejected that argument, and held that the company's photocopying was an infringement of the publisher's copyright. Texaco appealed to the Second Circuit Court of Appeals, which affirmed Leval in 1995; it was the first time an appellate court had considered the transformative use question.
