= Chimica Oggi – Chemistry Today =

- Discipline: Chemistry
- Language: English
- Edited by: Gayle De Maria

Publication details
- History: 1983-present
- Publisher: Tekno Scienze Publisher
- Frequency: Bimonthly
- Impact factor: 0.538 (2015)

Standard abbreviations
- ISO 4: Chim. Oggi – Chem. Today
- NLM: Chim Oggi

Indexing
- CODEN: CHOGDS
- ISSN: 0392-839X (print); 1973-8250 (web)
- OCLC no.: 859566286

Links
- Journal homepage; Online access; Online archive

Chimica Oggi – Chemistry Today is a bimonthly peer-reviewed scientific journal published by Tekno Scienze Publisher, covering chemistry. It was established in 1983 and the editor-in-chief is Gayle De Maria.

== Abstracting and indexing ==
The journal is abstracted and indexed in Copyright Clearance Center, Chemical Abstracts, Science Citation Index Expanded, and Scopus. According to the Journal Citation Reports, the journal has a 2015 impact factor of 0.538.
