= Pubget =

Scholarly search engine (2007–2017)

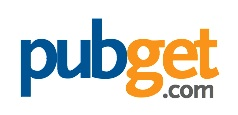
- Founded: Cambridge, MA, USA (2007)
- Headquarters: Boston, MA, USA
- Key people: Ramy Arnaout, Ian Connor, Ryan Jones
- Parent: Copyright Clearance Center
- Website: www.pubget.com

Pubget Corp was a wholly owned subsidiary of Copyright Clearance Center that developed cloud-based search and content access tools for scientists. It provided advertising services, enterprise search services, and a public search engine. The company was founded in 2007 by Beth Israel Hospital clinical pathologist Ramy Arnaout out of his own need to find papers. Pubget moved its headquarters from Cambridge, Massachusetts to Boston's Innovation District in 2011.

Pubget.com was a free service for non-profit institutions and their libraries and researchers. The site provided direct access to full-text content from 450 libraries around the world. It was announced in January 2012 that Pubget was acquired by Copyright Clearance Center. The service was closed in 2017.

== Products and services ==
Search Engine
Pubget's search engine retrieved article citations and full text PDFs from PubMed, ArXiv, Karger, American Society for Microbiology, IEEE, RSS feeds, XML from publishers, and Open Archive sources. The company's search engine contained over 28 million scientific documents and added 10,000 papers each day. Pubget created a link directly from the article citation to the paper itself via a continuously updated database of links. Because of this database, users were directly linked from a citation to the full-text paper.

Access to closed full-text PDFs was granted through the institution's subscriptions. Pubget did not bypass copyright laws and therefore displayed only the abstract of restricted papers if the end user did not have institutional access.

PaperStats
Pubget PaperStats was a usage and spend analysis tool for libraries. PaperStats automatically harvested serials usage statistics delivering consolidated usage, cost, and other reports directly from publishers. Content performance could be assessed through cost-per-view analysis. Upon introduction, PaperStats was beta tested with the USC Norris Medical Library and yielded positive results for Pubget, USC and the library community.

PaperStore
The Pubget PaperStore provided Pubget users the option of purchasing full text papers from thousands of journals on the search engine results page. Content rights and delivery were provided by document delivery vendor, Reprints Desk.

Advertising
Pubget provided several advertising solutions. Customers included Bio-Rad, Agilent, and other scientific brands. Ads were matched with paper content via contextual targeting. For example, manufacturers of a piece of scientific equipment could pay to advertise alongside a paper that mentions using said product. Pubget, however, did not reveal data on individual users and their searches.

Textmining
Pubget's textmining technology allowed research and development teams to uncover specific text strings across large groups of papers.

PaperStream
PaperStream was a web app that allowed lab teams to share, store, and find documents all in one place. PaperStream organized companies’ subscriptions, purchased papers, and internal documents into an automated library database.

API
Pubget's API provided access to its search and linking technology from third-party websites.
