= Course reader =

Type of academic publication by teachers for college/university courses

A course reader, also called a course pack or coursepack, is a publication type used for teaching in universities and academia. A course reader is made up of a collection of existing texts, course slides, and notes. Common forms of course readers include photocopy packs or PDF documents. Course readers require copyright clearance.

Course readers are distinguished from sourcebooks in that they are typically compiled by simply photocopying or scanning the selected materials and then adding covers, front matter, tables, and pagination. Thus, there is usually significant variation from one text to the next in a course reader because each document retains its original layout and typefaces. In contrast, the texts selected for inclusion in sourcebooks are usually edited, laid out, and typeset in a uniform format. Course readers are usually bound as softcover books and are intended only for use in the specific courses for which they were prepared, while sourcebooks are often bound as hardcover books similar to textbooks.

== History ==
The practice of assembling coursepacks, printed collections of readings assembled by teachers to supplement college and university courses, for students developed as a systematization of the practice of disseminating "course handouts" for readings in class. This practice operated in parallel to the practice of libraries providing "course reserves"—material pulled off shelves and "reserved" for use at the library, to ensure access for students in a class. Some teachers used coursepacks to supplement textbooks; others used them basically to create their own ad hoc textbooks.

Over time, teachers began assembling their handouts at the beginning of the course, or having school administrators assemble them and charge students enough fees to recoup costs. As copy shops such as Kinko's became a thriving business in the late 1970s and early 1980s, they developed a market for making these coursepacks, offering different sorts of bindings, and so forth. Once the market became commercialized, licensing entities such as the Copyright Clearance Center (the "CCC") in the United States became involved, negotiating licensing and "clearance" fees for use of materials in coursepacks. Materials that could not be licensed could not be included in coursepacks. Primarily as a result of escalating license fees, coursepacks have become a significant expense for students, along with textbooks.

Coursepacks themselves operated primarily as an efficient service for providing print copies of material. As information has become increasingly available electronically, academic libraries have begun a transition to electronic reserves, making materials they have already acquired available for students registered in particular classes. Publishers, once critics of coursepack providers, have been critical of ereserves, arguing that libraries' provision of ereserves will supplant the commercial coursepack services.

== Legal status ==
In the United States, the question of classroom handouts received significant attention in the lobbying and negotiation leading up to the 1976 Copyright Act. The statute as passed included a legislative codification of fair use at 17 U.S.C. 107 which specifically described handouts ("multiple copies for classroom use") as a fair use.

[T]he fair use of a copyrighted work, including such use by reproduction in copies ... for purposes such as ... teaching (including multiple copies for classroom use) ... is not an infringement of copyright."

However, the transition from classroom handouts to coursepacks led to a shift in how these materials were treated under US copyright law. In a series of "coursepack cases", US courts found that commercial services that profited from developing coursepacks were not protected by fair use. See Princeton University Press v. Michigan Document Services (1996), Basic Books v. Kinko's Graphics (1991); 1982 litigation against New York University.

Publishers and rights clearance agencies have sued universities in several other countries (Canada, New Zealand, India), in order to require fees for coursepacks or library ereserves.

== See also ==
- Textbooks
