= Tekno Scienze Publisher =

- Founded: 1983
- Country of origin: Italy
- Headquarters location: Milan
- Publication types: Scientific journals, monographs
- Nonfiction topics: Science
- Official website: www.teknoscienze.com

Tekno Scienze Publisher is an academic publisher in Italy. It publishes 3 scientific journals in a broad range of scientific and technical disciplines: Chimica Oggi – Chemistry Today, Agro Food Industry Hi Tech, and Household and Personal Care Today.
