= Course reserve =

Course reserve is a term used in academic libraries to describe materials set aside for a specific academic course or other use. Most often materials are put on course reserve by library staff at the request of the course's instructor. Materials on reserve typically have shorter loan periods than other library materials to allow access to a high volume of library patrons - for example, the students taking the course in question. Reserve materials usually return to normal circulation at the end of the term.

== E-reserves ==
Many academic libraries are installing software and supporting availability of course readings in digital formats through a service referred to as "electronic course reserves" or "e-reserves." The service provides controlled access to materials in a digital format but limited to students in a specific course. Such services are often connected to other classroom services for collaboration and course management.

== Copyright ==
Libraries often place excerpts from copyrighted works in closed or electronic reserves in accordance with Fair Use guidelines, which govern formal classroom distribution of photocopied materials and extend to reserve readings as well.

== See also ==
- Cambridge University Press v. Patton
