= Indirect liability =

Indirect liability refers to legal liability imposed on an entity which is facilitating an infringement of another's rights, particularly of intellectual property rights, but not accruing benefit (or loss) from the infringement. Indirect liability can be imposed on the facilitator if it is economically efficient. One reason it can be efficient is that a facilitator might be in best position to stop the infringement. This is relevant and often talked about in context of content holders vs Internet service providers or other media manufacturers lawsuits.
