= Williams & Wilkins Co. v. United States =

- Supreme Court of the United States

Argued December 17, 1974 Decided February 25, 1975
- Full case name: Williams & Wilkins Co. v. United States
- Citations: 420 U.S. 376 (more)

Case history
- Prior: 487 F.2d 1345 (Ct. Cl. 1973)

Holding
- Court of Claims held that it was a fair use for libraries to photocopy articles for use by patrons engaged in scientific research. The judgment is affirmed by an equally divided Supreme Court.

Court membership
- Chief Justice Warren E. Burger Associate Justices William O. Douglas · William J. Brennan Jr. Potter Stewart · Byron White; Thurgood Marshall · Harry Blackmun; Lewis F. Powell Jr. · William Rehnquist

Case opinion
- Per curiam
- Blackmun took no part in the consideration or decision of the case.

Williams & Wilkins Co. v. United States, 487 F.2d 1345 (Ct. Cl. 1973), was an important intellectual property decision by the federal Court of Claims, later affirmed by a per curiam opinion from an evenly divided United States Supreme Court, with only eight justices voting (Harry Blackmun took no part in the decision of this case). The decision held that it was a fair use for libraries to photocopy articles for use by patrons engaged in scientific research.

This decision, written by Judge Oscar Davis, has been cited as part of the trend in which the courts will take a cautious approach to intellectual property issues raised by the advent of new technology. Rather than enforce the rights of the author articles by placing a prohibition on such copying, the Court in this case held that this was not prohibited by the law as written, leaving it to the United States Congress to address the issue through legislation.

In particular, according to David L. Lange (No Law), the case was a turning point for the doctrine of fair use: while for many decades the standards applied by courts to enforce copyright (or not) had been "arcana", the 1976 Copyright Act codified some fundamental criteria.

== See also ==
- List of United States Supreme Court cases, volume 420
- CCH Canadian Ltd. v. Law Society of Upper Canada [2004]: Similar Canadian case
- Sony Corp. v. Universal City Studios (1982), holding that public use of videocassette recorders to view previously broadcast programs was within fair use
- American Geophysical Union v. Texaco, Inc. (1995), Second Circuit Court of Appeals case holding private company research library's similar photocopying of journal articles was not fair use due to commercial purpose.
