= Copyright Clearance Center =

U.S. company based in Danvers, Massachusetts

Copyright Clearance Center (CCC) is a U.S. company incorporated in New York State and based in Danvers, Massachusetts that provides collective copyright licensing services for corporate and academic users of copyrighted materials. CCC procures agreements with rightsholders, primarily academic publishers, and then acts as their agent in arranging collective licensing for institutions and one-time licensing for document delivery services, coursepacks, and other access and uses of texts.

== History ==
CCC was founded in 1978 as a not-for-profit organization in response to negotiations preceding the United States Copyright Act of 1976. The I.R.S. revoked CCC's tax-exempt status in 1982 and the United States Tax Court affirmed that holding, finding that whatever public benefits CCC's activities might produce, its primary purpose was to "further the economic interest of publishers and copyright owners" and its founders (a group of publishers) had no "interests of any substance beyond the creation of a device to protect their copyright ownership and collect license fees". CCC still maintains a state-level not-for-profit status in the State of New York.

== Licensing work ==
CCC is a broker of licenses, earning a 15% commission on the fees it collects. The company passes more than 70% of its revenues to publishers in the form of royalty payments to rightholders, and another 30% is kept by the company as a fee for its services.

CCC is a primarily US-based rights broker for materials, including millions of in- and out-of-print books, journals, newspapers, magazines, movies, television shows, images, blogs and e-books. CCC licenses copyright-protected content to businesses and academic institutions, and compensates publishers and content creators for the use of their works. Amsterdam-based RightsDirect, the wholly owned European subsidiary of Copyright Clearance Center established in 2010, provides copyright licensing services for European-based companies for print and digital content in books, journals, newspapers, magazines and images.

The "collective licensing" model that CCC employs is distinct from statutory licensing, in that it is voluntary, as opposed to mandated by statute. As a voluntary industry-developed model, CCC has been able to develop and initiate a variety of different licensing schemes, as well as to litigate and legislate on behalf of rightsholders. The voluntary licenses available from Copyright Clearance Center are of two kinds: repertory (or, annual) and transactional. The license systems are offered through various services, for instance, to corporations (the Annual Copyright License) or to academic institutions (the Academic Permissions Service, among others). Through these, and multiple other mechanisms, CCC collects fees which represent royalty payments and then periodically distributes these monies to participating rightsholders. CCC meets its operating expenses through allocating a fraction of these fees.

== Products ==
In 2000, CCC released RightsLink, a product that handles automated permission and reprint requests.

CCC later expanded into the search domain, with a suite collectively known as RightFind. To expand this, the company acquired Pubget, a search engine for scientists, in 2012, although this was subsequently closed in 2017. In 2014, the company acquired Infotrieve, a text mining company. In 2015, the company announced that RightFind could now allow users to search CCC for documents and then export them into 3rd party text mining software, currently limited to only Linguamatics or SciBite.

== Lobbying and litigation ==
CCC, along with the Association of American Publishers (AAP), recruited three publishers (Oxford University Press, Cambridge University Press, and Sage Publications) to sue Georgia State University, alleging that GSU's e-reserves system infringed copyright. CCC and AAP jointly underwrote the costs of the litigation in the case, Cambridge University Press v. Becker, which cost the plaintiffs several million dollars to litigate initially.

The plaintiffs lost the case, and were ordered to pay the defendant's legal fees when Georgia State University was deemed the "prevailing party". Notwithstanding the "prevailing party" decision, the plaintiffs characterized the case as "flawed" but not a "loss", and nonetheless filed an appeal. The attorneys' fees were estimated by plaintiffs to be "substantial." CCC has announced it will continue to fund 50% of litigation costs on appeal.

CCC has been involved in lobbying and litigation to expand the scope of copyright, and is a founding member of the International Federation of Reproduction Rights Organisations (IFRRO), which has a similar position.
