= Princeton University =

Private university in Princeton, New Jersey, US

- Latin: Universitas Princetoniensis
- Former name: College of New Jersey (1746–1896)
- Motto: Dei Sub Numine Viget (Latin); On seal: Vet[us] Nov[um] Testamentum (Latin)
- Motto in English: "Under God's Power She Flourishes"; On seal: "Old Testament and New Testament"
- Type: Private research university
- Established: October 22, 1746; 280 years ago
- Accreditation: MSCHE
- Academic affiliations: AAU; COFHE; NAICU; URA; space-grant
- Endowment: $42.3 billion (2026)
- Budget
- President: Christopher L. Eisgruber
- Provost: Jennifer Rexford
- Faculty: 1,128 (fall 2024)
- Total staff: 7,300
- Students: 9,137 (fall 2024)
- Undergraduates: 5,813 (fall 2024)
- Postgraduates: 3,324 (fall 2024)
- Doctoral students: 2,631
- Location: Princeton, New Jersey, United States; 40°20′43″N 74°39′22″W
- Campus: 600 acres (2.4 km^{2}); Small city
- Newspaper: The Daily Princetonian
- Colors: Black and orange
- Nickname: Tigers
- Sporting affiliations: NCAA Division I FCS – Ivy League; ECAC Hockey; EARC; EIVA; CWPA; IRA; EAWRC
- Mascot: The Tiger
- Website: princeton.edu

Princeton University is a private Ivy League research university in Princeton, New Jersey, United States. Founded in 1746 in Elizabeth as the College of New Jersey, Princeton is the fourth-oldest institution of higher education in the United States and one of the nine colonial colleges chartered before the American Revolution. (Note: Princeton is the fourth institution of higher learning to obtain a collegiate charter, conduct classes, or grant degrees, based upon dates that do not seem to be in dispute. Princeton and the University of Pennsylvania both claim the fourth oldest founding date and the University of Pennsylvania once claimed 1749 as its founding date, making it fifth oldest, but in 1899 its trustees adopted a resolution which asserted 1740 as the founding date. To further complicate the comparison of founding dates, a Log College was operated by William and Gilbert Tennent, the Presbyterian ministers, in Bucks County, Pennsylvania, from 1726 until 1746 and it was once common to assert a formal connection between it and the College of New Jersey, which would justify Princeton pushing its founding date back to 1726. However, Princeton has never done so and a Princeton historian says that the facts "do not warrant" such an interpretation. Columbia University was chartered and began collegiate classes in 1754. Columbia considers itself to be the fifth institution of higher learning in the United States, based upon its charter date of 1754 and Penn's charter date of 1755.) The institution moved to Newark in 1747 and then to its Mercer County campus in Princeton nine years later. It officially became a university in 1896 and was subsequently renamed Princeton University.

The university is governed by the Trustees of Princeton University and has an endowment of $42.3 billion, the largest endowment per student in the United States. Princeton provides undergraduate and graduate instruction in the humanities, social sciences, natural sciences, and engineering to approximately 9,000 students on its main campus spanning 600 acres (2.4 km^{2}) within the borough of Princeton. It offers postgraduate degrees through the Princeton School of Public and International Affairs, the School of Engineering and Applied Science, the School of Architecture and the Bendheim Center for Finance. The university also manages the Department of Energy's Princeton Plasma Physics Laboratory and is home to the NOAA's Geophysical Fluid Dynamics Laboratory. It is classified among "R1: Doctoral Universities – Very high research activity" and has one of the largest university libraries in the world.

Princeton uses a residential college system and is known for its eating clubs for juniors and seniors. The university has over 500 student organizations. Princeton students embrace a wide variety of traditions from both the past and present. The university is an NCAA Division I school and competes in the Ivy League. The school's athletic team, the Princeton Tigers, has won the most titles in its conference and has sent many students and alumni to the Olympics.

As of October 2025, 81 Nobel laureates, 16 Fields Medalists and 17 Turing Award laureates have been affiliated with Princeton University as alumni, faculty members, or researchers. In addition, Princeton has been associated with 21 National Medal of Science awardees, five Abel Prize awardees, a Dan David Prize awardee, 11 National Humanities Medal recipients, 217 Rhodes Scholars, 137 Marshall Scholars, and 62 Gates Cambridge Scholars. Two U.S. presidents, twelve U.S. Supreme Court justices (three of whom serve on the court as of 2026) and numerous living industry and media tycoons and foreign heads of state are all counted among Princeton's alumni body. Princeton has graduated many members of the U.S. Congress and the U.S. Cabinet, including eight secretaries of state, three secretaries of defense and two chairmen of the Joint Chiefs of Staff. Princeton alumni also include 113 athletes who competed in the Olympics, winning 19 gold medals, 24 silver medals, and 23 bronze medals.

== History ==
=== Founding ===
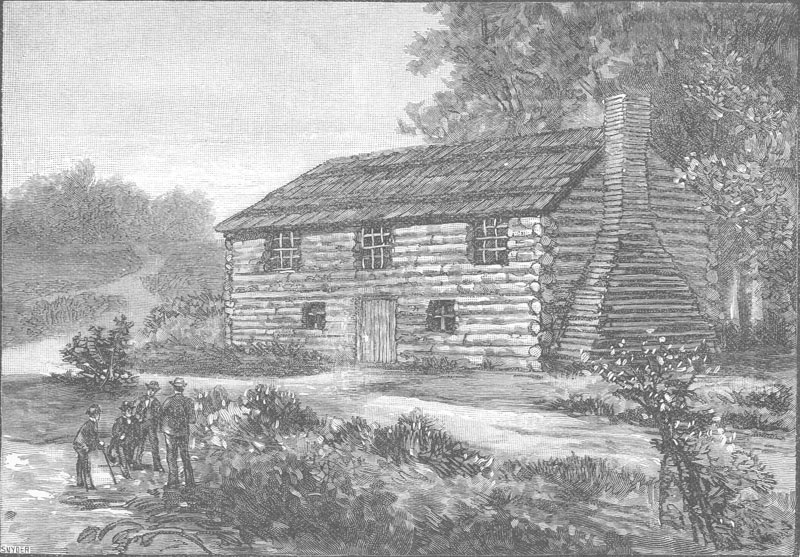
The Log College, an influential aspect of Princeton's development

Princeton University, founded as the College of New Jersey, was shaped much in its formative years by the "Log College", a seminary founded by the Reverend William Tennent at Neshaminy, Pennsylvania, in about 1726. While no legal connection ever existed, many of the pupils and adherents from the Log College would go on to financially support and become substantially involved in the early years of the university. While early writers considered it as the predecessor of the university, the idea has been rebuked by Princeton historians.

The founding of the university itself originated from a split in the Presbyterian church following the Great Awakening. In 1741, New Light Presbyterians were expelled from the Synod of Philadelphia in defense of how the Log College ordained ministers. The four founders of the College of New Jersey, who were New Lights, were either expelled or withdrew from the Synod and devised a plan to establish a new college, for they were disappointed with Harvard and Yale's opposition to the Great Awakening and dissatisfied with the limited instruction at the Log College. They convinced three other Presbyterians to join them and decided on New Jersey as the location for the college, as at the time, there was no institution between Yale College in New Haven, Connecticut, and the College of William & Mary in Williamsburg, Virginia; it was also where some of the founders preached. Although their initial request was rejected by the Anglican governor Lewis Morrison, the acting governor after Morrison's death, John Hamilton, granted a charter for the College of New Jersey on October 22, 1746. In 1747, approximately five months after acquiring the charter, the trustees elected Jonathan Dickinson as president and opened in Elizabeth, New Jersey, where classes were held in Dickinson's parsonage. With its founding, it became the fourth-oldest institution of higher education in the United States, and one of nine colonial colleges chartered before the American Revolution. The founders aimed for the college to have an expansive curriculum to teach people of various professions, not solely ministerial work. Though the school was open to those of any religious denomination, with many of the founders being of Presbyterian faith, the college became the educational and religious capital of Scotch-Irish Presbyterian America.

=== Colonial and early years ===
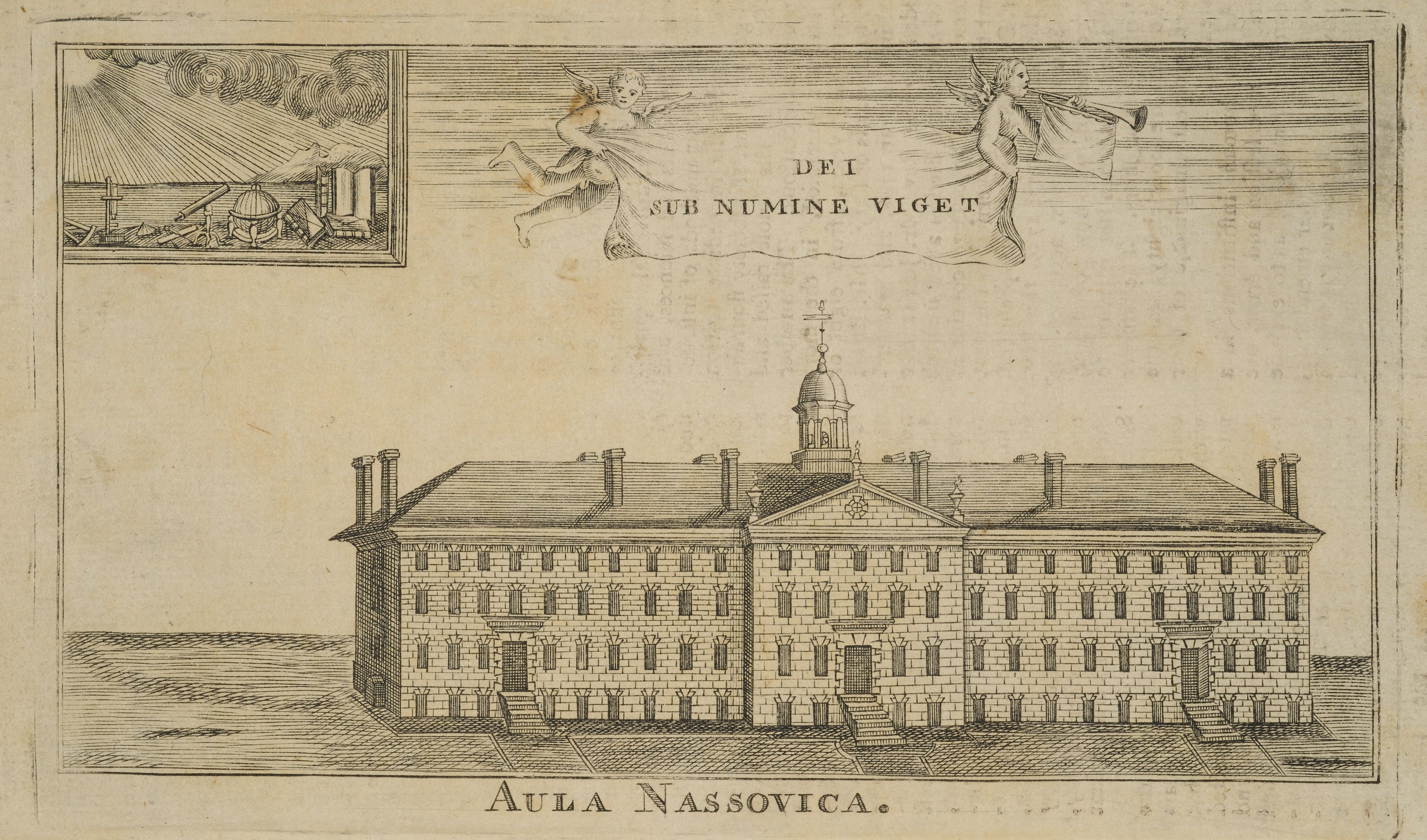
From 1760, the first picture of Nassau Hall

In 1747, following the death of then President Jonathan Dickinson, the college moved from Elizabeth to Newark, New Jersey, as that was where presidential successor Aaron Burr Sr.'s parsonage was located. That same year, Princeton's first charter came under dispute by Anglicans, but on September 14, 1748, the recently appointed governor Jonathan Belcher granted a second charter. Belcher, a Congregationalist, had become alienated from his alma mater, Harvard, and decided to "adopt" the infant college. Belcher would go on to raise funds for the college and donate his 474-volume library, making it one of the largest libraries in the colonies.

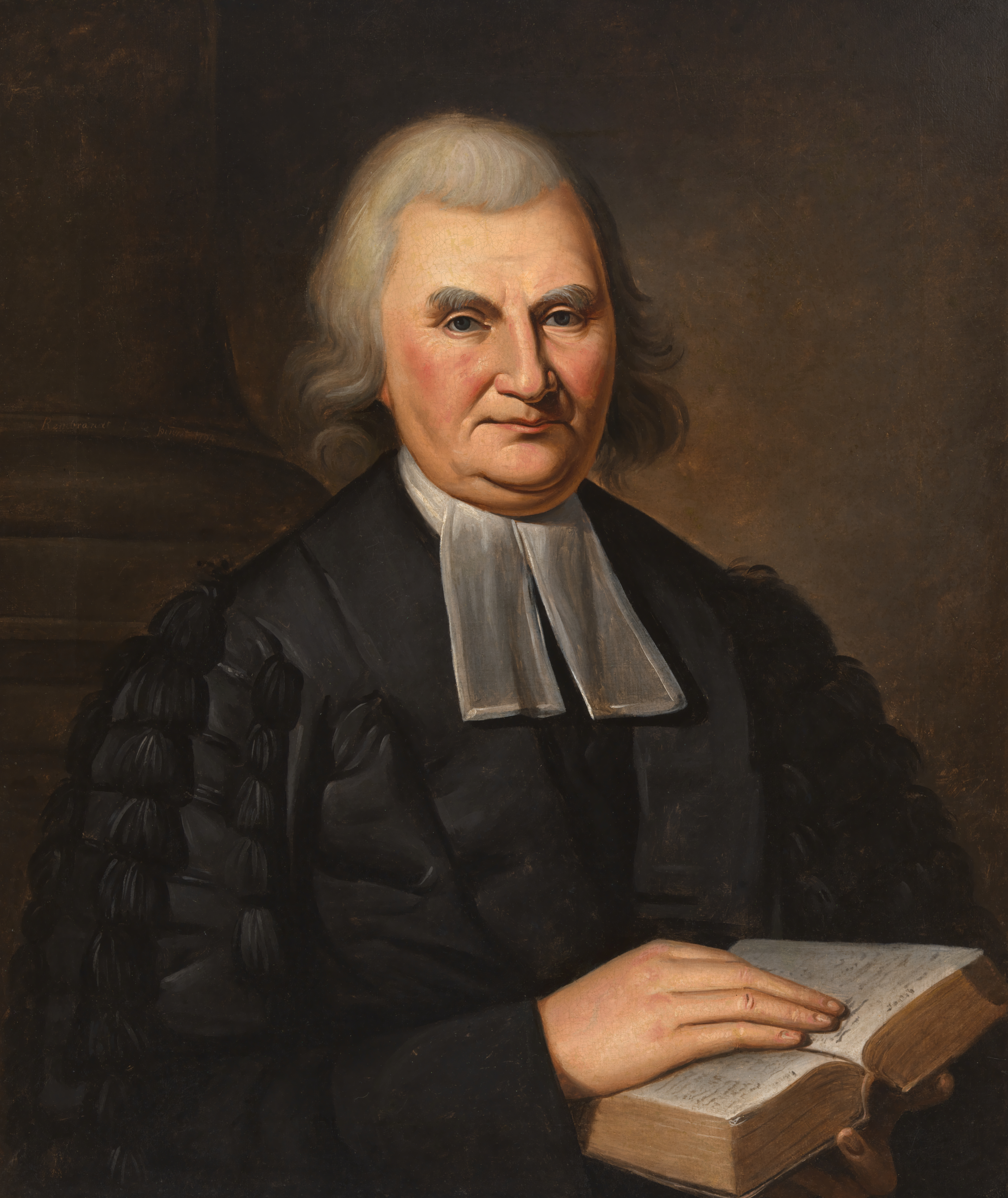
John Witherspoon, president of the college (1768–94) and signer of the Declaration of Independence

In 1756, the college moved again to its present home in Princeton, New Jersey, because Newark was felt to be too close to New York. Princeton was chosen for its location in central New Jersey and by strong recommendation by Belcher. The college's home in Princeton was Nassau Hall, named for the royal William III of England, a member of the House of Orange-Nassau. The trustees of the College of New Jersey initially suggested that Nassau Hall be named in recognition of Belcher because of his interest in the institution; the governor vetoed the request.

Burr, who would die in 1757, devised a curriculum for the school and enlarged the student body. Following the untimely death of Burr and the college's next three presidents, John Witherspoon became president in 1768 and remained in that post until his death in 1794. With his presidency, Witherspoon focused the college on preparing a new generation of both educated clergy and secular leadership in the new American nation. To this end, he tightened academic standards, broadened the curriculum, solicited investment for the college, and grew its size.

A signatory of the Declaration of Independence, Witherspoon and his leadership led the college to becoming influential to the American Revolution. In 1777, the college became the site for the Battle of Princeton. During the battle, British soldiers briefly occupied Nassau Hall before eventually surrendering to American forces led by General George Washington. During the summer and fall of 1783, the Continental Congress and Washington met in Nassau Hall, making Princeton the country's capital for four months; Nassau Hall is where Congress learned of the peace treaty between the colonies and the British. The college did suffer from the revolution, with a depreciated endowment and hefty repair bills for Nassau Hall.

=== 19th century ===
In 1795, President Samuel Stanhope Smith took office, the first alumnus to become president. Nassau Hall suffered a large fire that destroyed its interior in 1802, which Smith blamed on rebellious students. The college raised funds for reconstruction, as well as the construction of two new buildings. In 1807, a large student riot occurred at Nassau Hall, spurred by underlying distrust of educational reforms by Smith away from the Church. Following Smith's mishandling of the situation, falling enrollment, and faculty resignations, the trustees of the university offered resignation to Smith, which he accepted. In 1812, Ashbel Green was unanimously elected by the trustees of the college to become the eighth president. After the liberal tenure of Smith, Green represented the conservative "Old Side", in which he introduced rigorous disciplinary rules and heavily embraced religion. Even so, believing the college was not religious enough, he took a prominent role in establishing the Princeton Theological Seminary next door. While student riots were a frequent occurrence during Green's tenure, enrollment did increase under his administration.

In 1823, James Carnahan became president, arriving as an unprepared and timid leader. With the college riven by conflicting views between students, faculty, and trustees, and enrollment hitting its lowest in years, Carnahan considered closing the university. Carnahan's successor, John Maclean Jr., who was only a professor at the time, recommended saving the university with the help of alumni; as a result, Princeton's alumni association, led by James Madison, was created and began raising funds. With Carnahan and Maclean, now vice-president, working as partners, enrollment and faculty increased, tensions decreased, and the college campus expanded. Maclean took over the presidency in 1854, and led the university through the American Civil War. When Nassau Hall burned down again in 1855, Maclean raised funds and used the money to rebuild Nassau Hall and run the university on an austerity budget during the war years. With a third of students from the college being from the South, enrollment fell. Once many of the Southerners left, the campus became a sharp proponent for the Union, even bestowing an honorary degree to President Lincoln.

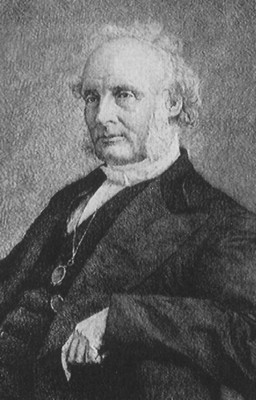
James McCosh, president of the college (1868–88)

James McCosh became the college's president in 1868, and lifted the institution out of a low period that had been brought about by the war. During his two decades of service, he overhauled the curriculum, oversaw an expansion of inquiry into the sciences, recruited distinguished faculty, and supervised the addition of a number of buildings in the High Victorian Gothic style to the campus. McCosh's tenure also saw the creation and rise of many extracurricular activities, like the Princeton Glee Club, the Triangle Club, the first intercollegiate football team, and the first permanent eating club, as well as the elimination of fraternities and sororities. In 1879, Princeton conferred its first doctorates on James F. Williamson and William Libby, both members of the Class of 1877.

Francis Patton took the presidency in 1888, and although his election was not met by unanimous enthusiasm, he was well received by undergraduates. Patton's administration was marked by great change, for Princeton's enrollment and faculty had doubled. At the same time, the college underwent large expansion and social life was changing in reflection of the rise in eating clubs and burgeoning interest in athletics. In 1893, the honor system was established, allowing for unproctored exams. In 1896, the college officially became a university, and as a result, it officially changed its name to Princeton University. In 1900, the Graduate School was formally established. Even with such accomplishments, Patton's administration remained lackluster with its administrative structure and towards its educational standards. Due to profile changes in the board of trustees and dissatisfaction with his administration, he was forced to resign in 1902.

=== 20th century ===
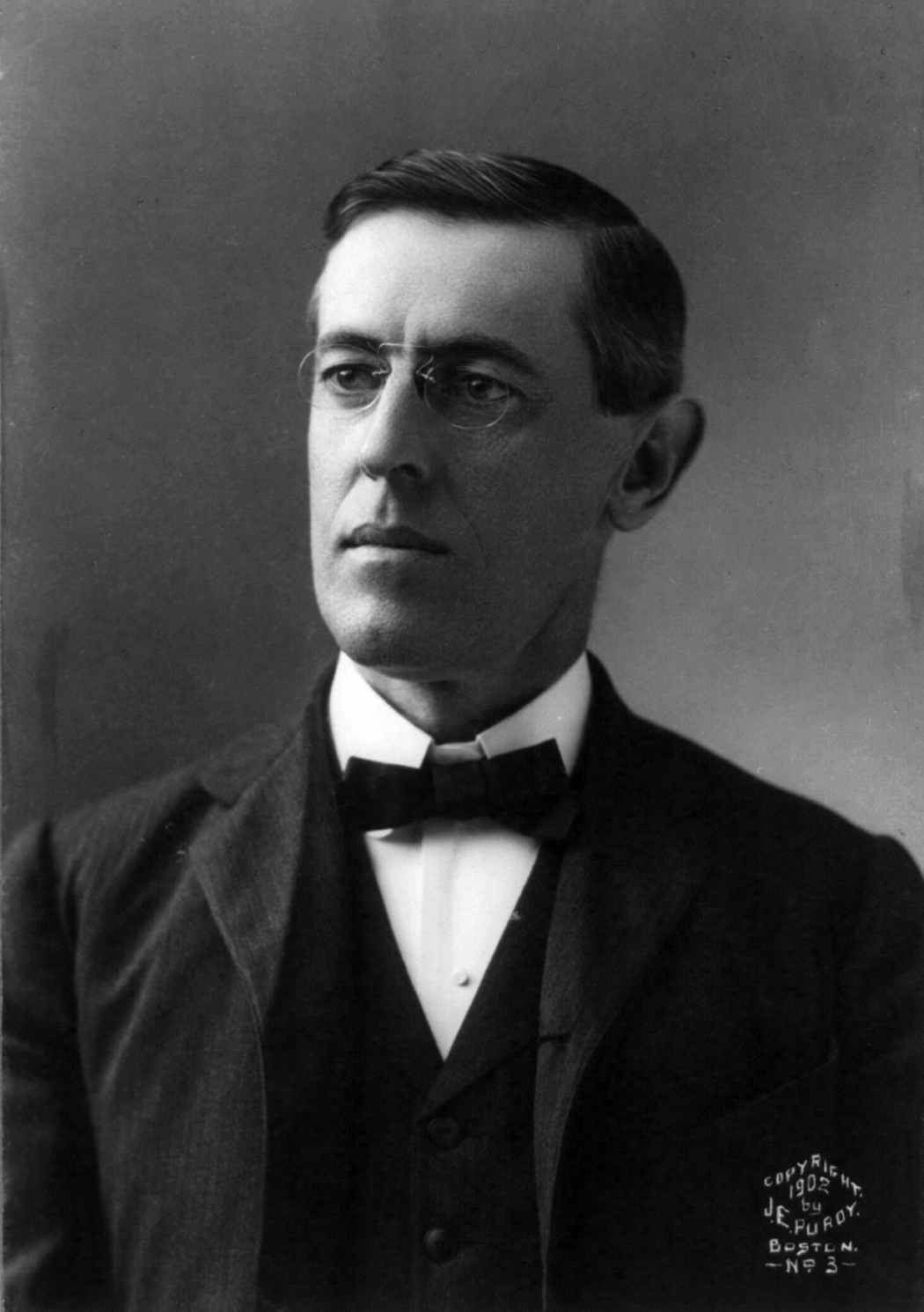
Woodrow Wilson, president of Princeton University (1902–10) and 28th president of the United States

Following Patton's resignation, Woodrow Wilson, an alumnus and popular professor, was elected the 13th president of the university. Noticing falling academic standards, Wilson orchestrated significant changes to the curriculum, where freshman and sophomores followed a unified curriculum while juniors and seniors concentrated study in one discipline. Ambitious seniors were allowed to undertake independent work, which would eventually shape Princeton's emphasis on the practice for the future. Wilson further reformed the educational system by introducing the preceptorial system in 1905, a then-unique concept in the United States that augmented the standard lecture method of teaching with a more personal form in which small groups of students, or precepts, could interact with a single instructor, or preceptor, in their field of interest. The changes brought about many new faculty and cemented Princeton's academics for the first half of the 20th century. Due to the tightening of academic standards, enrollment declined severely until 1907. In 1906, the reservoir Lake Carnegie was created by Andrew Carnegie, and the university officially became nonsectarian. Before leaving office, Wilson strengthened the science program to focus on "pure" research and broke the Presbyterian lock on the board of trustees. However, he did fail in winning support for the permanent location of the Graduate School and the elimination of the eating clubs, which he proposed replacing with quadrangles, a precursor to the residential college system. Wilson also continued to keep Princeton closed off from accepting Black students. When an aspiring Black student wrote a letter to Wilson, he had his secretary reply telling him to attend a university where he would be more welcome.

John Grier Hibben became president in 1912, and would remain in the post for two decades. On October 2, 1913, the Princeton University Graduate College was dedicated. When the United States entered World War I in 1917, Hibben allocated all available University resources to the government. As a result, military training schools opened on campus and laboratories and other facilities were used for research and operational programs. Overall, more than 6,000 students served in the armed forces, with 151 dying during the war. After the war, enrollment spiked and the trustees established the system of selective admission in 1922. From the 1920s to the 1930s, the student body featured many students from preparatory schools, zero Black students, and dwindling Jewish enrollment because of quotas. Aside from managing Princeton during WWI, Hibben introduced the senior thesis in 1923 as a part of The New Plan of Study. He also brought about great expansion to the university, with the creation of the School of Architecture in 1919, the School of Engineering in 1921, and the School of Public and International Affairs in 1930. By the end of his presidency, the endowment had increased by 374 percent, the total area of the campus doubled, the faculty experienced impressive growth, and the enrollment doubled.

Hibben's successor, Harold Willis Dodds, would lead the university through the Great Depression, World War II, and the Korean Conflict. With the Great Depression, many students were forced to withdraw due to financial reasons. At the same time, Princeton's reputation in physics and mathematics surged as many European scientists left for the United States due to uneasy tension caused by Nazi Germany. In 1930, the Institute for Advanced Study was founded to provide a space for the influx of scientists, such as Albert Einstein. Many Princeton scientists would work on the Manhattan Project during the war, including the entire physics department. During World War II, Princeton offered an accelerated program for students to graduate early before entering the armed forces. Student enrollment fluctuated from month to month, and many faculty were forced to teach unfamiliar subjects. Still, Dodds maintained academic standards and would establish a program for servicemen, so they could resume their education once discharged.

=== 1945 to present ===
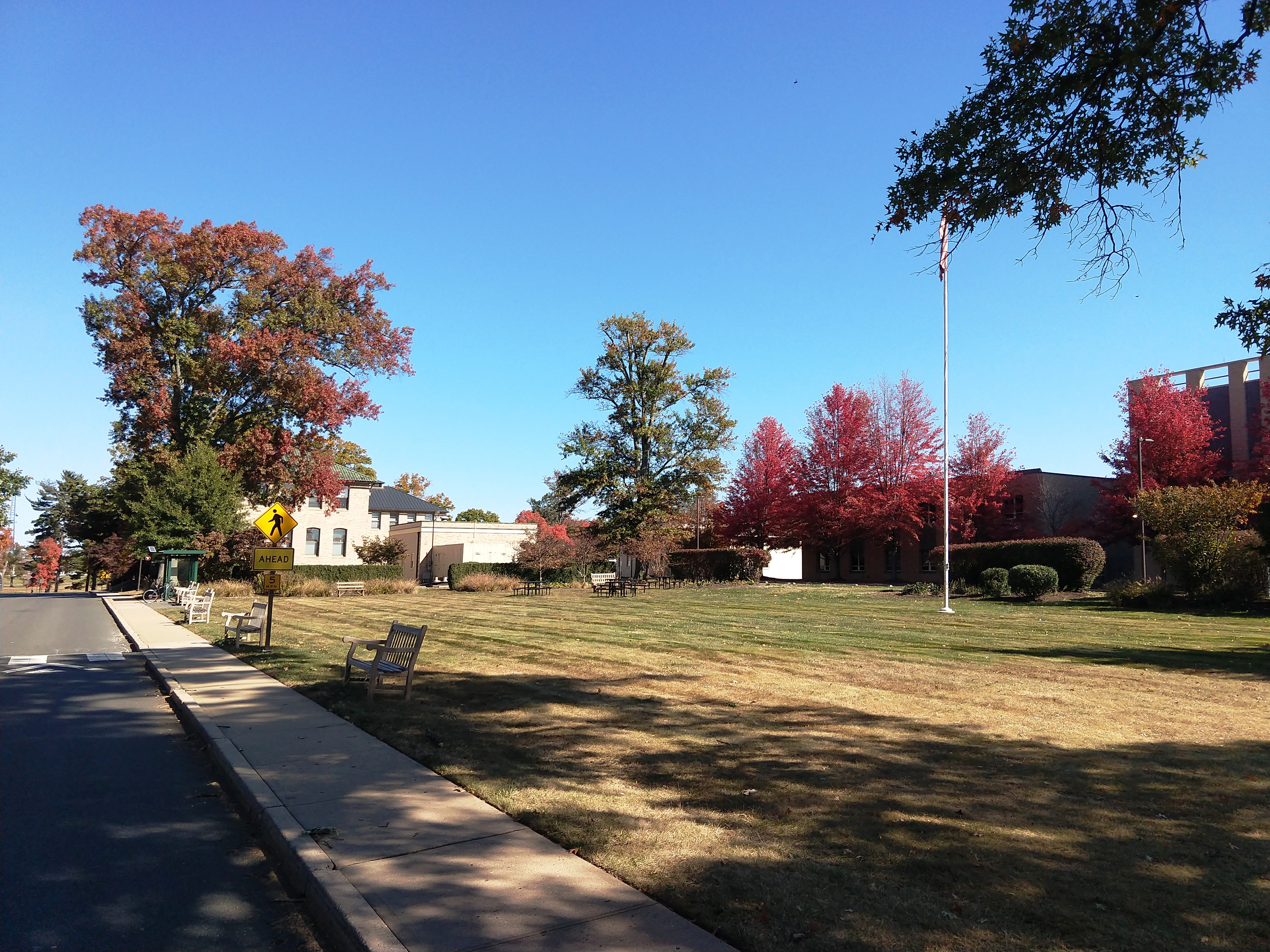
Center of Forrestal Campus

The post-war years saw scholars renewing broken bonds through numerous conventions, expansion of the campus, and the introduction of distribution requirements. The period saw the desegregation of Princeton, which was stimulated by changes to the New Jersey constitution. Princeton began undertaking a sharper focus towards research in the years after the war, with the construction of Firestone Library in 1948 and the establishment of the Forrestal Research Center in nearby Plainsboro Township in the 1950s. Government sponsored research increased sharply, particularly in the physics and engineering departments, with much of it occurring at the new Forrestal campus. Though, as the years progressed, scientific research at the Forrestal campus declined, and in 1973, some of the land was converted to commercial and residential spaces.

Robert Goheen would succeed Dodds by unanimous vote and serve as president until 1972. Goheen's presidency was characterized as being more liberal than previous presidents, and his presidency would see a rise in Black applicants, as well as the eventual coeducation of the university in 1969. During this period of rising diversity, the Third World Center (now known as the Carl A. Fields Center) was dedicated in 1971. Goheen also oversaw great expansion for the university, with square footage increasing by 80 percentage.

Throughout the 1960s and 1970s, Princeton experienced unprecedented activism, with most of it centered on the Vietnam War. While Princeton activism initially remained relatively timid compared to other institutions, protests began to grow with the founding of a local chapter of Students for a Democratic Society (SDS) in 1965, which organized many of the later Princeton protests. In 1966, the SDS gained prominence on campus following picketing against a speech by President Lyndon B. Johnson, which gained frontpage coverage by the New York Times. A notable point of contention on campus was the Institute for Defense Analyses (IDA) and would feature multiple protests, some of which required police action. In 1967, SDS members and sympathizers beat the campus R.O.T.C. chapter in a game of touch football. As the years went on, the protests' agenda broadened to investments in South Africa, environmental issues, and women's rights. In response to these broadening protests, the Council of the Princeton University Community (CPUC) was founded to serve as a method for greater student voice in governance. Activism culminated in 1970 with a student, faculty, and staff member strike, so the university could become an "institution against expansion of the war." (Note: The strike was part of the broader Student Strike of 1970.) Princeton's protests would taper off later that year, with The Daily Princetonian saying that, "Princeton 1970–71 was an emotionally burned out university."

In 1982, the residential college system was officially established under Goheen's successor William G. Bowen, who would serve until 1988. During his presidency, Princeton's endowment increased from $625 million to $2 billion, and a major fundraising drive known as "A Campaign for Princeton" was conducted. President Harold T. Shapiro would succeed Bowen and remain president until 2001. Shapiro would continue to increase the endowment, expand academic programs, raise student diversity, and oversee the most renovations in Princeton's history. One of Shapiro's initiatives was the formation of the multidisciplinary Princeton Environmental Institute in 1994, renamed the High Meadows Environmental Institute in 2020. In 2001, Princeton shifted the financial aid policy to a system that replaced all loans with grants. That same year, Princeton elected its first female president, Shirley M. Tilghman. Before retiring in 2012, Tilghman expanded financial aid offerings and conducted several major construction projects like the Lewis Center for the Arts and a sixth residential college. Tilghman also led initiatives for more global programs, the creation of an office of sustainability, and investments into the sciences.

Princeton's 20th and current president, Christopher Eisgruber, was elected in 2013. In 2017, Princeton University unveiled a large-scale public history and digital humanities investigation into its historical involvement with slavery called the Princeton & Slavery Project. The project saw the publication of hundreds of primary sources, 80 scholarly essays, a scholarly conference, a series of short plays, and an art project. In April 2018, university trustees announced that they would name two public spaces for James Collins Johnson and Betsey Stockton, enslaved people who lived and worked on Princeton's campus and whose stories were publicized by the project. In 2019, large-scale student activism again entered the mainstream concerning the school's implementation of federal Title IX policy relating to campus sexual assault. The activism consisted of sit-ins in response to a student's disciplinary sentence.

In April 2024, students joined other campuses across the United States in protests and establishing encampments against the Gaza war and the alleged genocide of Palestinians in Gaza. The protestors called for divestment from Israel, started a hunger strike and were joined by faculty. The sit-in of Clio Hall led to arrests by police. Activism and protests continued in the new academic year starting September 2024 with administrators facing calls for resignation from faculty.

=== Coeducation ===
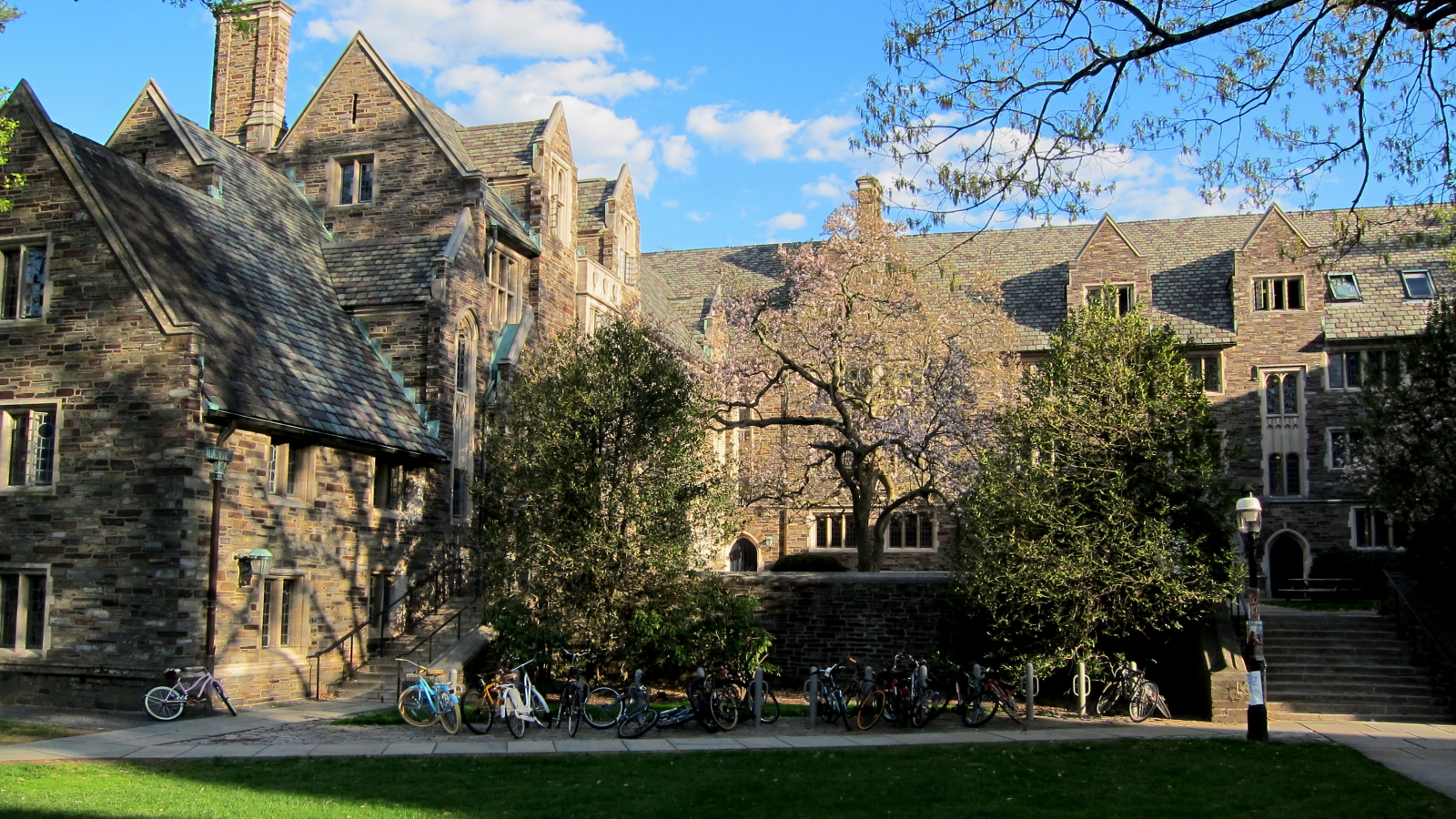
Pyne Hall, where the first female students lived on campus

Princeton explicitly prohibited the admission of women from its founding in 1746 until 1969. Since it lacked an affiliated women's college, it was often referred to as a "monastery", both lovingly and derisively, by members of the Princeton community. For about a decade, from 1887 to 1897, nearby Evelyn College for Women was largely composed of daughters of professors and sisters of Princeton undergraduates. While no legal connection existed, many Princeton professors taught there and several Princeton administrators, such as Francis Patton, were on its board of trustees. It closed in 1897 following the death of its founder, Joshua McIlvaine.

In 1947, three female members of the library staff enrolled in beginning Russian courses to deal with an increase in Russian literature in the library. In 1961, Princeton admitted its first female graduate student, Sabra Follett Meservey, who would go on to be the first woman to earn a master's degree at Princeton. Meservey was, at the time of her admission, already a member of the faculty at Douglass College within Princeton. The dean of the graduate school issued a statement clarifying that Meservey's admission was an exception, and that "Princeton may permit other women in the future as special cases, but does not plan to make general admissions of women graduate students." The student-run Daily Princetonian ran four articles about Meservey in one issue, including an editorial lamenting the potential "far reaching implications" of Meservey's admission which concluded: "Princeton is unique as an undergraduate men's college and must remain so." Eight more women enrolled the following year in the Graduate School. In 1964, T'sai-ying Cheng became the first woman at Princeton to receive a Ph.D. In 1963, five women came to Princeton for one year to study "critical languages" as undergraduates, but were not candidates for a Princeton degree. Following abortive discussions with Sarah Lawrence College to relocate the women's college to Princeton and merge it with the university in 1967, the administration commissioned a report on admitting women. The final report was issued in January 1969, supporting the idea. That same month, Princeton's trustees voted 24–8 in favor of coeducation and began preparing the institution for the transition. The university finished these plans in April 1969 and announced there would be coeducation in September. Ultimately, 101 female freshman and 70 female transfer students enrolled at Princeton in September 1969. (Note: 505 women applied to join the Princeton freshman class.) Those admitted were housed in Pyne Hall, a fairly isolated dormitory; a security system was added, although the women deliberately broke it within a day.

In 1971, Mary St. John Douglas and Susan Savage Speers became the first female trustees, and in 1974, quotas for men and women were eliminated. Following a 1979 lawsuit, the eating clubs were required to go coeducational in 1991, after an appeal to the U.S. Supreme Court was denied. In 2001, Princeton elected its first female president.

== Campus ==
Princeton University Campus Historic buildings Libraries Arts venues Housing and dining Open spaces Sports Princeton campus

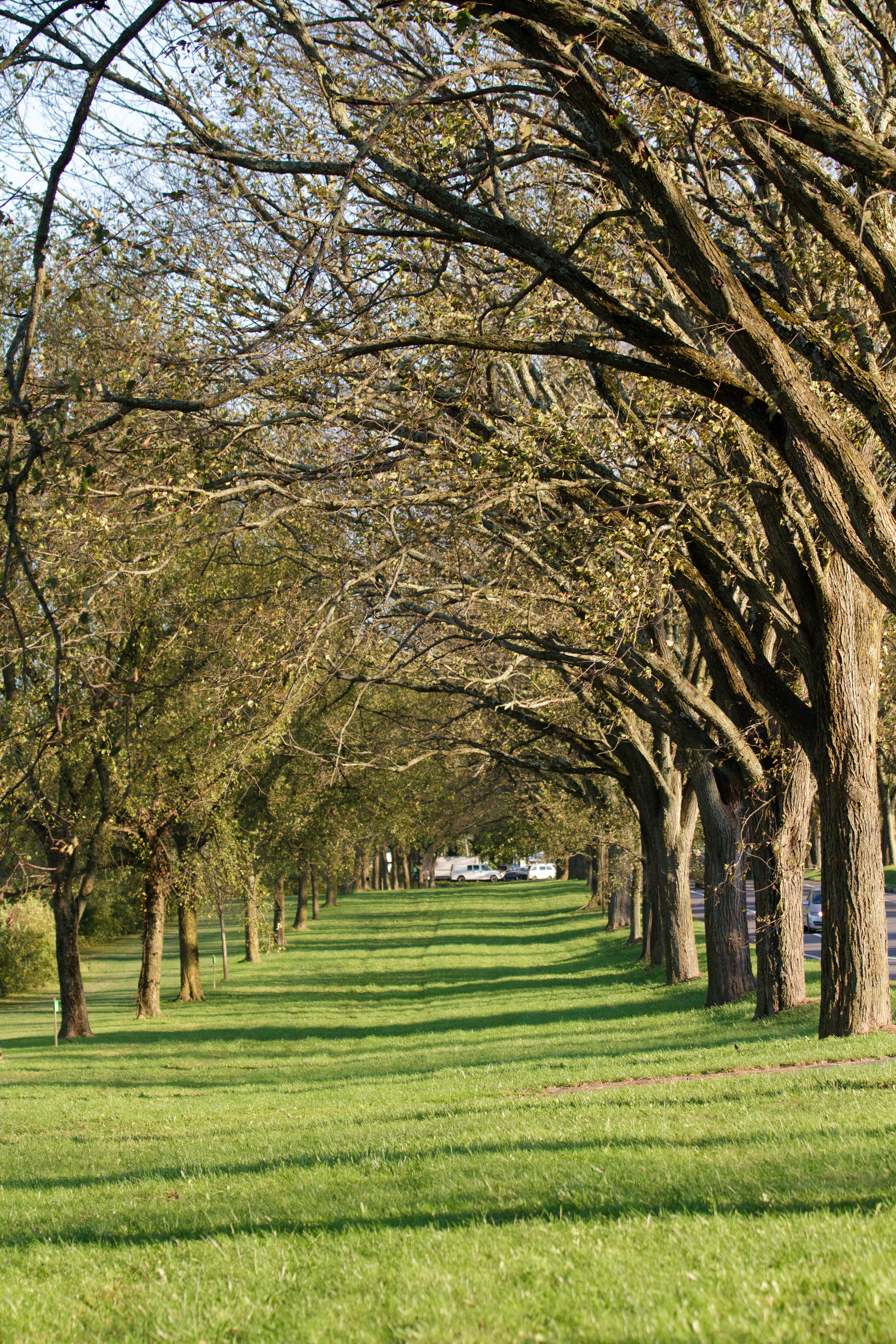
The eastern side of the Washington Road Elm Allée, one of the entrances to the campus

The main campus consists of more than 200 buildings on 600 acres (2.4 km^{2}) in Princeton, New Jersey. The James Forrestal Campus, a smaller location designed mainly as a research and instruction complex, is split between nearby Plainsboro and South Brunswick. The campuses are situated about one hour from both New York City and Philadelphia on the train. The university also owns more than 520 acres (2.1 km^{2}) of property in West Windsor Township, and is where Princeton is planning to construct a graduate student housing complex, which will be known as "Lake Campus North".

Aerial view looking southwest across the main campus (left) and Nassau Street (right), December 2025

The first building on campus was Nassau Hall, completed in 1756, and situated on the northern edge of the campus facing Nassau Street. The campus expanded steadily around Nassau Hall during the early and middle 19th century. The McCosh presidency (1868–88) saw the construction of a number of buildings in the High Victorian Gothic and Romanesque Revival styles, although many of them are now gone, leaving the remaining few to appear out of place. At the end of the 19th century, much of Princeton's architecture was designed by the Cope and Stewardson firm (led by the same University of Pennsylvania professors of architecture who designed a large part of Washington University in St. Louis and University of Pennsylvania) resulting in the Collegiate Gothic style for which Princeton is known for today. Implemented initially by William Appleton Potter, and later enforced by the university's supervising architect, Ralph Adams Cram, the Collegiate Gothic style remained the standard for all new building on the Princeton campus until 1960. A flurry of construction projects in the 1960s produced a number of new buildings on the south side of the main campus, many of which have been poorly received. Several prominent architects have contributed some more recent additions, including Frank Gehry (Lewis Library), I. M. Pei (Spelman Halls), Demetri Porphyrios (Whitman College, a Collegiate Gothic project), Robert Venturi and Denise Scott Brown (Frist Campus Center, among several others), Minoru Yamasaki (Robertson Hall), and Rafael Viñoly (Carl Icahn Laboratory).

A group of 20th-century sculptures scattered throughout the campus forms the Putnam Collection of Sculpture. It includes works by Alexander Calder (Five Disks: One Empty), Jacob Epstein (Albert Einstein), Henry Moore (Oval with Points), Isamu Noguchi (White Sun), and Pablo Picasso (Head of a Woman). Richard Serra's The Hedgehog and The Fox is located between Peyton and Fine halls next to Princeton Stadium and the Lewis Library.

At the southern edge of the campus is Lake Carnegie, an artificial lake named for Andrew Carnegie. Carnegie financed the lake's construction in 1906 at the behest of a friend and his brother who were both Princeton alumni. Carnegie hoped the opportunity to take up rowing would inspire Princeton students to forsake football, which he considered "not gentlemanly." The Shea Rowing Center on the lake's shore continues to serve as the headquarters for Princeton rowing.

Princeton's grounds were designed by Beatrix Farrand between 1912 and 1943. Her contributions were most recently recognized with the naming of a courtyard for her. Subsequent changes to the landscape were introduced by Quennell Rothschild & Partners in 2000. In 2005, Michael Van Valkenburgh was hired as the new consulting landscape architect for Princeton's 2016 Campus Plan. Lynden B. Miller was invited to work with him as Princeton's consulting gardening architect, focusing on the 17 gardens that are distributed throughout the campus.

=== Buildings ===
==== Nassau Hall ====
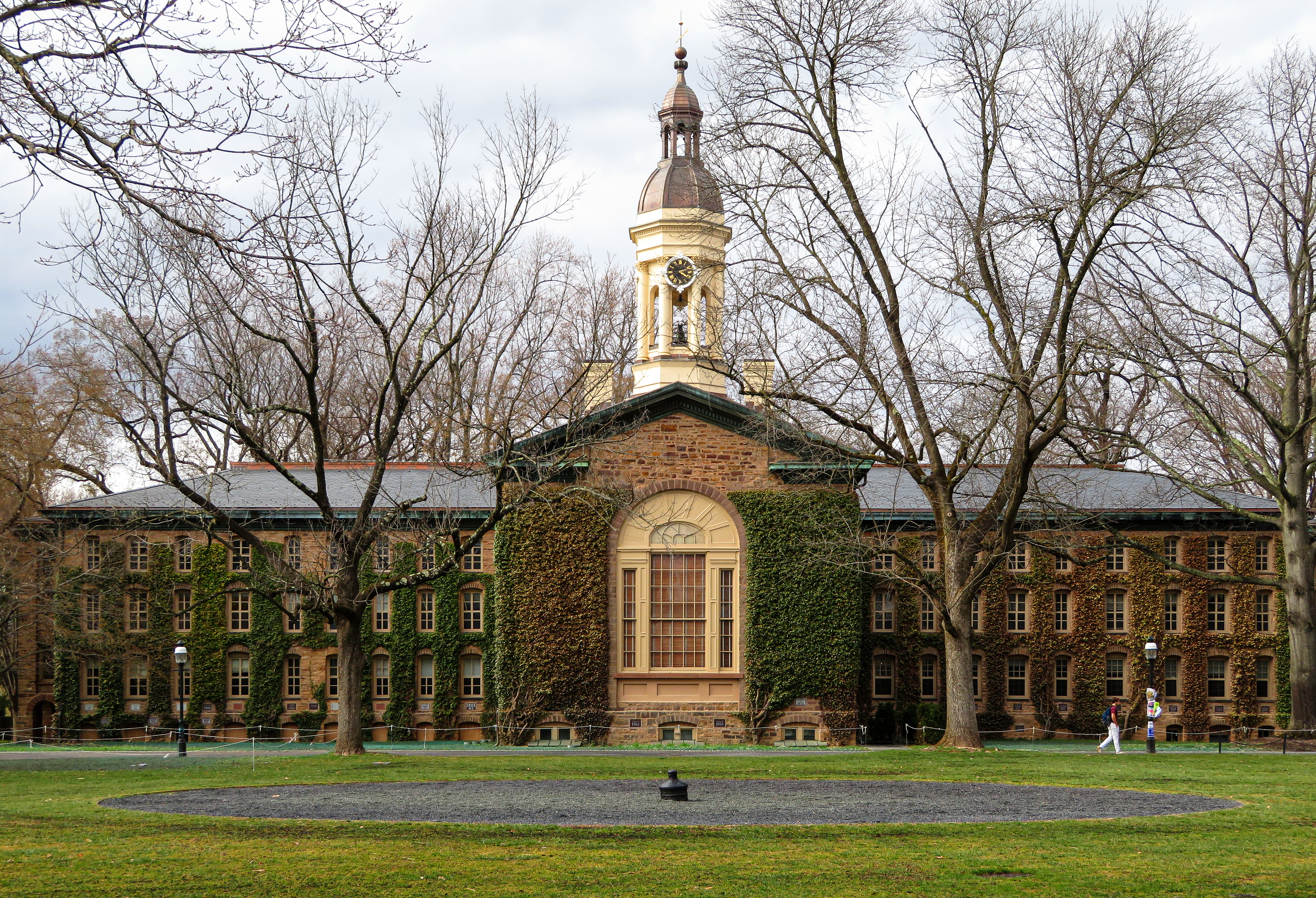
Nassau Hall, the university's oldest building and former capitol of the United States. Pictured in front is Cannon Green.

Nassau Hall is the oldest building on campus. Begun in 1754 and completed in 1756, it was the first seat of the New Jersey Legislature in 1776, was involved in the Battle of Princeton in 1777, and was the seat of the Congress of the Confederation (and thus capitol of the United States) from June 30, 1783, to November 4, 1783. Since 1911, the front entrance has been flanked by two bronze tigers, a gift of the Princeton Class of 1879, which replaced two lions previously given in 1889. Starting in 1922, commencement has been held on the front lawn of Nassau Hall when there is good weather. In 1966, Nassau Hall was added to the National Register of Historic Places. Nowadays, it houses the office of the university president and other administrative offices.

To the south of Nassau Hall lies a courtyard that is known as Cannon Green. Buried in the ground at the center is the "Big Cannon", which was left in Princeton by British troops as they fled following the Battle of Princeton. It remained in Princeton until the War of 1812, when it was taken to New Brunswick. In 1836, the cannon was returned to Princeton and placed at the eastern end of town. Two years later, it was moved to the campus under cover of night by Princeton students, and in 1840, it was buried in its current location. A second "Little Cannon" is buried in the lawn in front of nearby Whig Hall. The cannon, which may also have been captured in the Battle of Princeton, was stolen by students of Rutgers University in 1875. The theft ignited the Rutgers-Princeton Cannon War. A compromise between the presidents of Princeton and Rutgers ended the war and forced the return of the Little Cannon to Princeton. The protruding cannons are occasionally painted scarlet by Rutgers students who continue the traditional dispute.

==== Art Museum ====
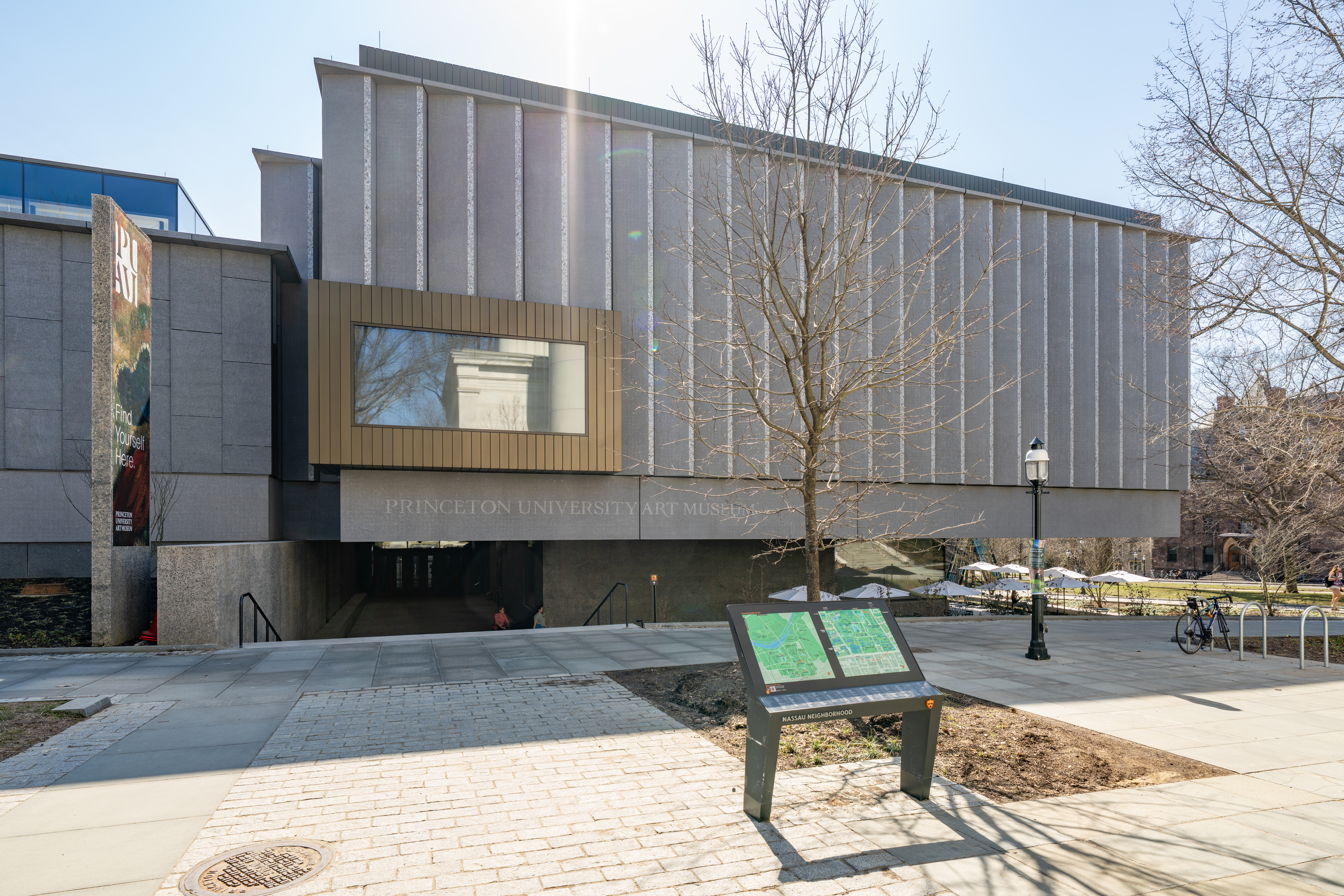
The Princeton University Art Museum, which holds over 112,000 objects

Though the art collection at the university dates back to its very founding, the Princeton University Art Museum was not officially established until 1882 by President McCosh. Its establishment arose from a desire to provide direct access to works of art in a museum for a curriculum in the arts, an education system familiar to many European universities at the time. The museum took on the purposes of providing "exposure to original works of art and to teach the history of art through an encyclopedic collection of world art."

Numbering over 112,000 objects, the collections range from ancient to contemporary art and come from Europe, Asia, Africa, and the Americas. The museum's art is divided into ten extensive curatorial areas. There is a collection of Greek and Roman antiquities, including ceramics, marbles, bronzes, and Roman mosaics from faculty excavations in Antioch, as well as other art from the ancient Egyptian, Byzantium, and Islamic worlds. The non-Islamic coins were catalogued by Dorothy B. Waage. Medieval Europe is represented by sculpture, metalwork, and stained glass. The collection of Western European paintings includes examples from the early Renaissance through the 19th century, with pieces by Monet, Cézanne, and Van Gogh, and features a growing collection of 20th-century and contemporary art, including paintings such as Andy Warhol's Blue Marilyn.

The museum features a collection of Chinese and Japanese art, with holdings in bronzes, tomb figurines, painting, and calligraphy, as well as collections of Korean, Southeast, and Central Asian art. Its collection of pre-Columbian art includes examples of Mayan and Olmec art, and its indigenous art ranges from Chile to Alaska to Greenland. The museum has collections of old master prints and drawings, and it has a comprehensive collection of over 20,000 photographs. Approximately 750 works of African art are represented. The museum oversees the outside John B. Putnam Jr., Memorial Collection of Sculpture.

==== University Chapel ====
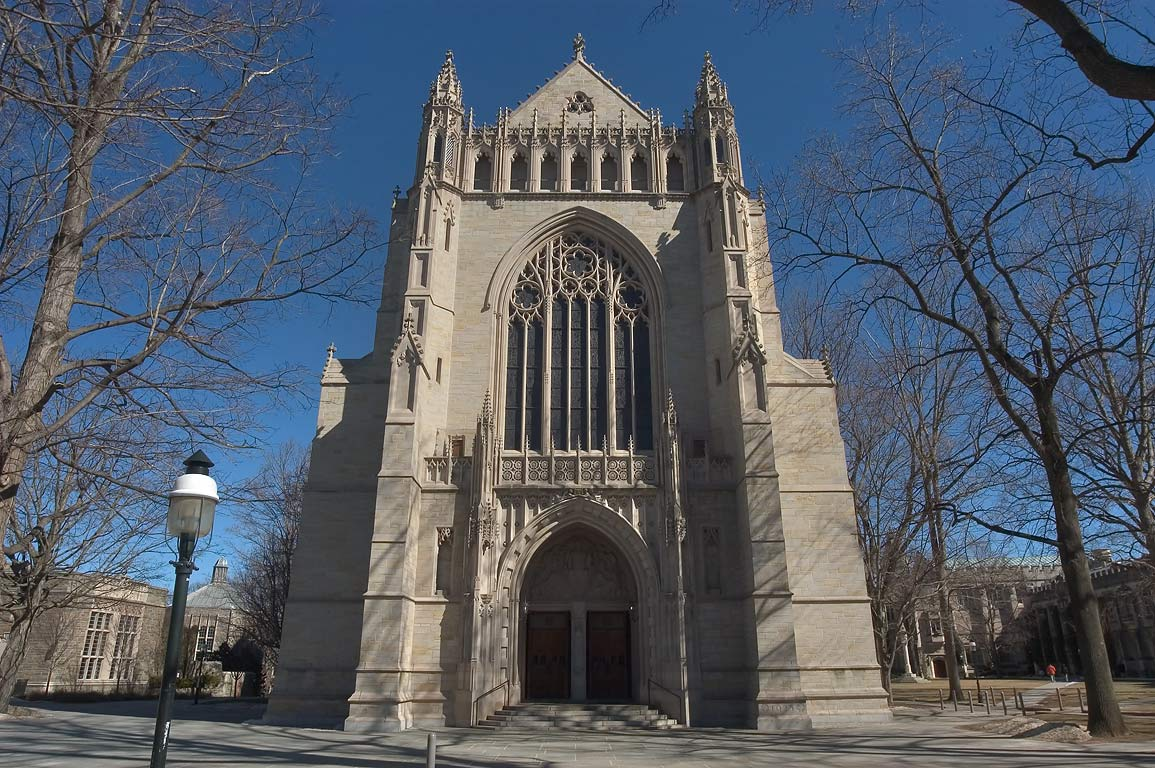
Finished in 1928, the Princeton University Chapel seats 2,000 people.

The Princeton University Chapel is located on the north side of campus near Nassau Street. It was built between 1924 and 1928 at a cost of $2.3 million, approximately $43.1 million adjusted for inflation in 2020. Ralph Adams Cram, the university's supervising architect, designed the chapel, which he viewed as the crown jewel for the Collegiate Gothic motif he had championed for the campus. At the time of its construction, it was the second-largest university chapel in the world, after King's College Chapel, Cambridge. It underwent a two-year, $10 million restoration campaign between 2000 and 2002. The Chapel seats around 2,000 and serves as a site for religious services and local celebrations.

Measured on the exterior, the chapel is 277 feet (84 m) long, 76 feet (23 m) wide at its transepts, and 121 feet (37 m) high. The exterior is Pennsylvania sandstone, trimmed with Indiana limestone, and the interior is made of limestone and Aquia Creek sandstone. The design evokes characteristics of an English church of the Middle Ages. The extensive iconography, in stained glass, stonework, and wood carvings, has the common theme of connecting religion and scholarship.

=== Sustainability ===
Published in 2008, the Sustainability Action Plan was the first formal plan for sustainability enacted by the university. It focused on reducing greenhouse gas emissions, conservation of resources, and research, education, and civic engagement for sustainability through 10 year objectives. Since the 2008 plan, Princeton has aimed at reducing its carbon dioxide emissions to 1990 levels without the purchase of market offsets and predicts to meet the goal by 2026 (the former goal was by 2020 but COVID-19 requirements delayed this). Princeton released its second Sustainability Action Plan in 2019 on Earth Day with its main goal being reducing campus greenhouse gases to net zero by 2046 as well as other objectives building on those in the 2008 plan. In 2021, the university agreed to divest from thermal coal and tar sand segments of the fossil fuel industry and from companies that are involved in climate disinformation after student protest. Princeton is a member of the Ivy Plus Sustainability Consortium, through which it has committed to best-practice sharing and the ongoing exchange of campus sustainability solutions along with other member institutions.

Princeton's Sustainability Action Plan also aims to have zero waste through recycling programs, sustainable purchasing, and behavioral and operational strategies.

== Organization and administration ==
=== Governance and structure ===
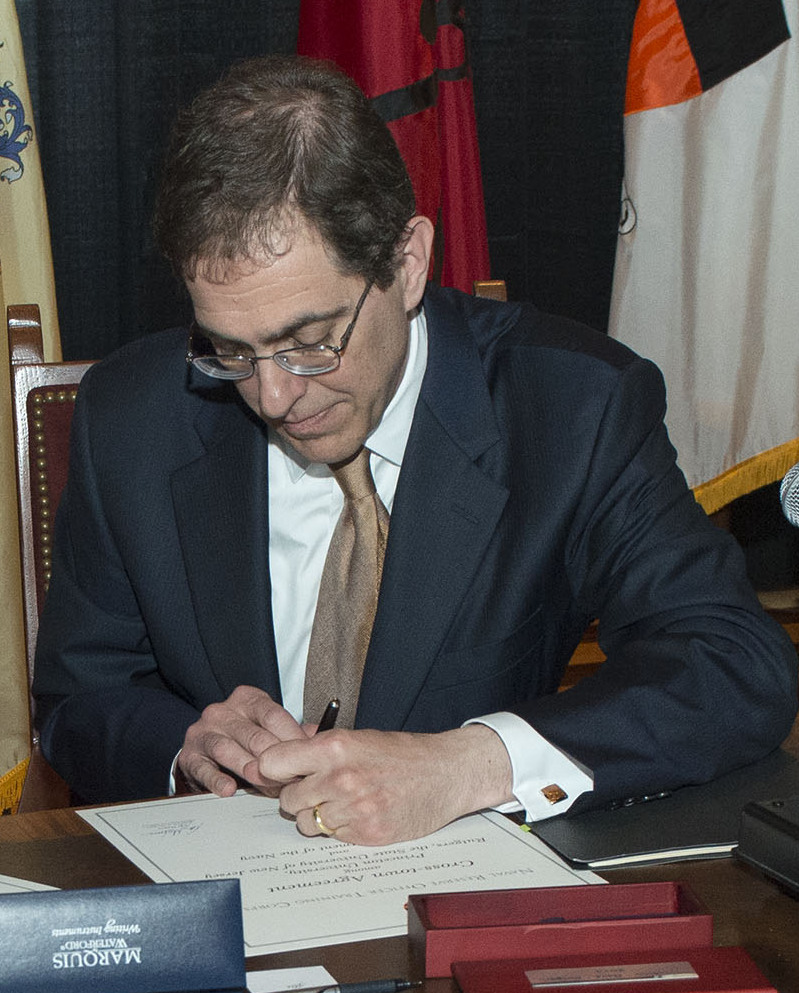
Christopher Eisgruber, the 20th and current president of the university

Princeton's 20th and current president is Christopher Eisgruber, who was appointed by the university's board of trustees in 2013. The board is responsible for the overall direction of the university. It consists of no fewer than 23 and no more than 40 members at any one time, with the president of the university and the governor of New Jersey serving as ex officio members. It approves the operating and capital budgets, supervises the investment of the university's endowment, and oversees campus real estate and long-range physical planning. The trustees also exercise prior review and approval concerning changes in major policies such as those in instructional programs and admission as well as tuition and fees and the hiring of faculty members.

The university is composed of the Undergraduate College, the Graduate School, the School of Architecture, the School of Engineering and Applied Science, and the School of Public and International Affairs. Additionally, the school's Bendheim Center for Finance provides education for the area of money and finance in lieu of a business school. Princeton hosted a Princeton Law School for a short period, before eventually closing in 1852 due to poor income. Princeton's lack of other professional schools can be attributed to a university focus on undergraduates.

The university has ties with the Institute for Advanced Study, Princeton Theological Seminary, Rutgers University, and the Westminster Choir College of Rider University. Princeton is a member of the Association of American Universities, the Universities Research Association, and the National Association of Independent Colleges and Universities. The university is accredited by the Middle States Commission on Higher Education (MSCHE), with its last reaffirmation in 2014.

=== Finances ===
Princeton University's endowment of $37 billion (per 2021 figures) was ranked as the fourth largest endowment in the United States, and it had the greatest per-student endowment in the world at over $4.4 million per student. The endowment is sustained through continued donations and is maintained by investment advisers. Princeton's operating budget is over $2 billion per year, with 50% going to academic departments and programs, 33% to administrative and student service departments, 10% to financial aid departments, and 7% to the Princeton Plasma Physics Laboratory.

== Academics ==
=== Undergraduate ===
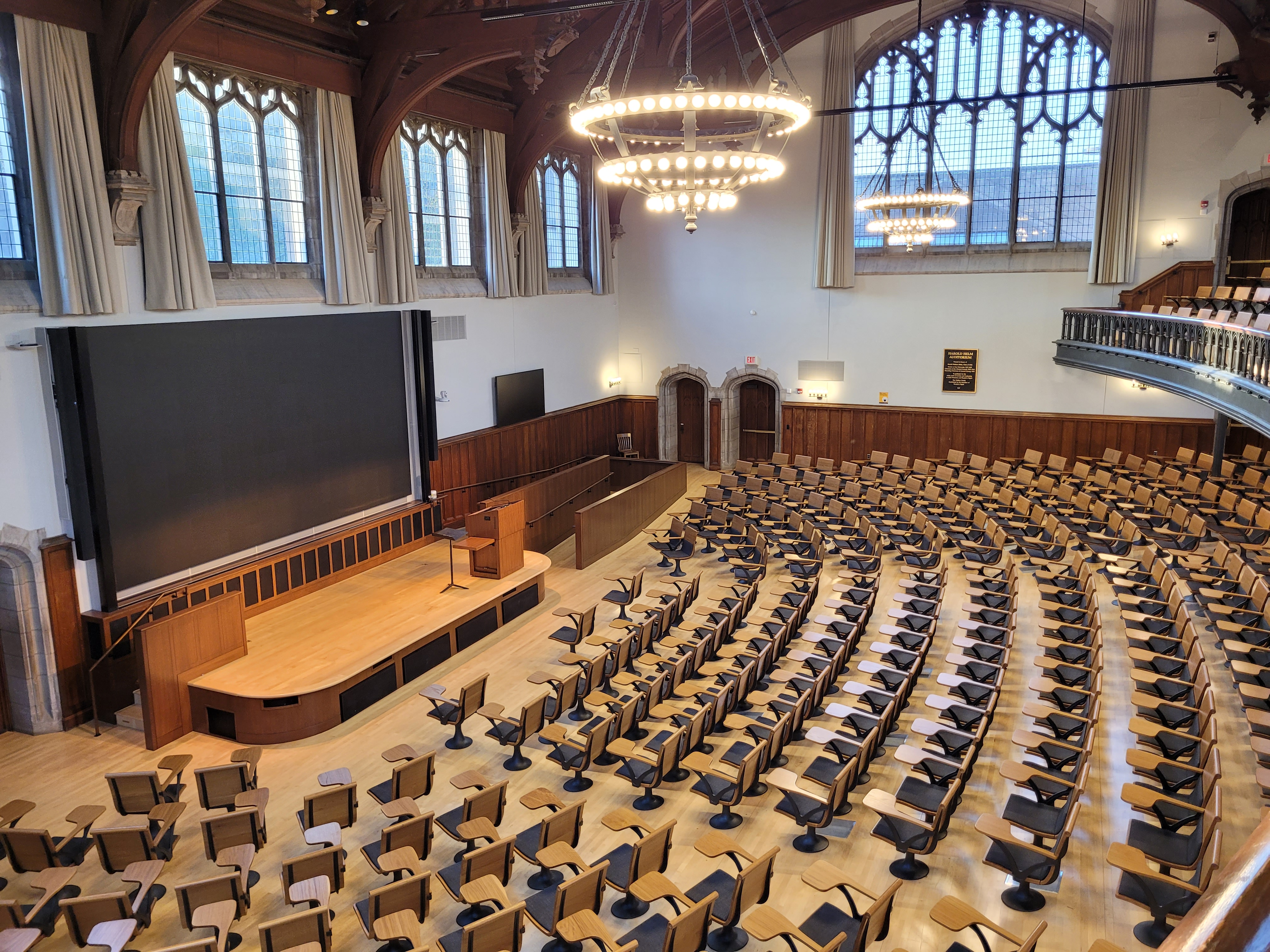
McCosh 50, the largest lecture hall on campus

Princeton follows a liberal arts curriculum, and offers two bachelor's degrees to students: a Bachelor of Arts (A.B.) and a Bachelor of Science in Engineering (B.S.E.). Typically, A.B. students choose a major (formerly called concentrations) at the end of sophomore year, while B.S.E. students declare at the end of their freshman year. Students must complete distribution requirements, departmental requirements, and independent work to graduate with either degree. A.B. students must complete distribution requirements in literature and the arts, science and engineering, social analysis, cultural difference, epistemology and cognition, ethical thought and moral values, historical analysis, and quantitative and computational reasoning; they must also have satisfactory ability in a foreign language. Additionally, they must complete two papers of independent work during their junior year—known as the junior papers—and craft a senior thesis to graduate; both revolve around the concentration they are pursuing. B.S.E. majors complete fewer courses in the humanities and social sciences and instead fulfill requirements in mathematics, physics, chemistry, and computer programming. They likewise must complete independent work, which typically involves a design project or senior thesis, but not the junior papers. A.B. majors must complete 31 courses, whereas B.S.E. majors must complete 36 courses.

Students can either choose from 37 majors or create their own. They can also participate in over 60 minors and interdisciplinary certificate programs. Course structure is determined by the instructor and department. Classes vary in their format, ranging from small seminars to medium-sized lecture courses to large lecture courses. The latter two typically have precepts, which are extra weekly discussion sessions that are led by either the professor or a graduate student. The average class meeting time is 3–4 hours a week, although this can vary depending on the course. The student to faculty ratio is 5 to 1, and a majority of classes have fewer than 20 students. In the Fiske Guide to Colleges, academic culture is considered as "tight-knit, extremely hardworking, highly cooperative, and supportive."

From 1893 to 2026, undergraduates had to agree to adhere to an academic integrity policy called the Honor Code. Under the Honor Code, faculty did not proctor examinations; instead, the students proctored one another and were required to report any suspected violation to an Honor Committee made up of undergraduates. The Committee investigated reported violations and held hearings if it was warranted. An acquittal at such a hearing resulted in the destruction of all records of the hearing; a conviction resulted in the student's suspension or expulsion. In 2026, Princeton announced it was ending the Honor Code system and introducing exam supervisors due to an increase in students using artificial intelligence to cheat on exams. Violations pertaining to all other academic work fall under the jurisdiction of the Faculty-Student Committee on Discipline. Undergraduates are expected to sign a pledge on their written work affirming that they have not plagiarized the work.

==== Grade deflation policy ====
The first focus on issues of grade inflation by the Princeton administration began in 1998 when a university report was released showcasing a steady rise in undergraduate grades from 1973 to 1997. Subsequent reports and discussion from the report culminated to when in 2004, Nancy Weiss Malkiel, the dean of the college, implemented a grade deflation policy to address the findings. Malkiel's reason for the policy was that an A was becoming devalued as a larger percentage of the student body received one. Following its introduction, the number of A's and average GPA on campus dropped, although A's and B's were still the most frequent grades awarded. The policy received mixed approval from both faculty and students when first instituted. Criticism for grade deflation continued through the years, with students alleging negative effects like increased competition and lack of willingness to choose challenging classes. Other criticism included job market and graduate school prospects, although Malkiel responded by saying that she sent 3,000 letters to numerous institutions and employers informing them. In 2009, transcripts began including a statement about the policy.

In October 2013, Princeton President Christopher Eisgruber created a faculty committee to review the deflation policy. In August 2014, the committee released a report recommending the removal of the policy and instead develop consistent standards for grading across individual departments. In October 2014, following a faculty vote, the numerical targets were removed in response to the report. In a 2020 analysis of undergraduate grades following the removal of a policy, there were no long-lasting effects, with the percent of students receiving A's higher than in 1998.

=== Graduate ===
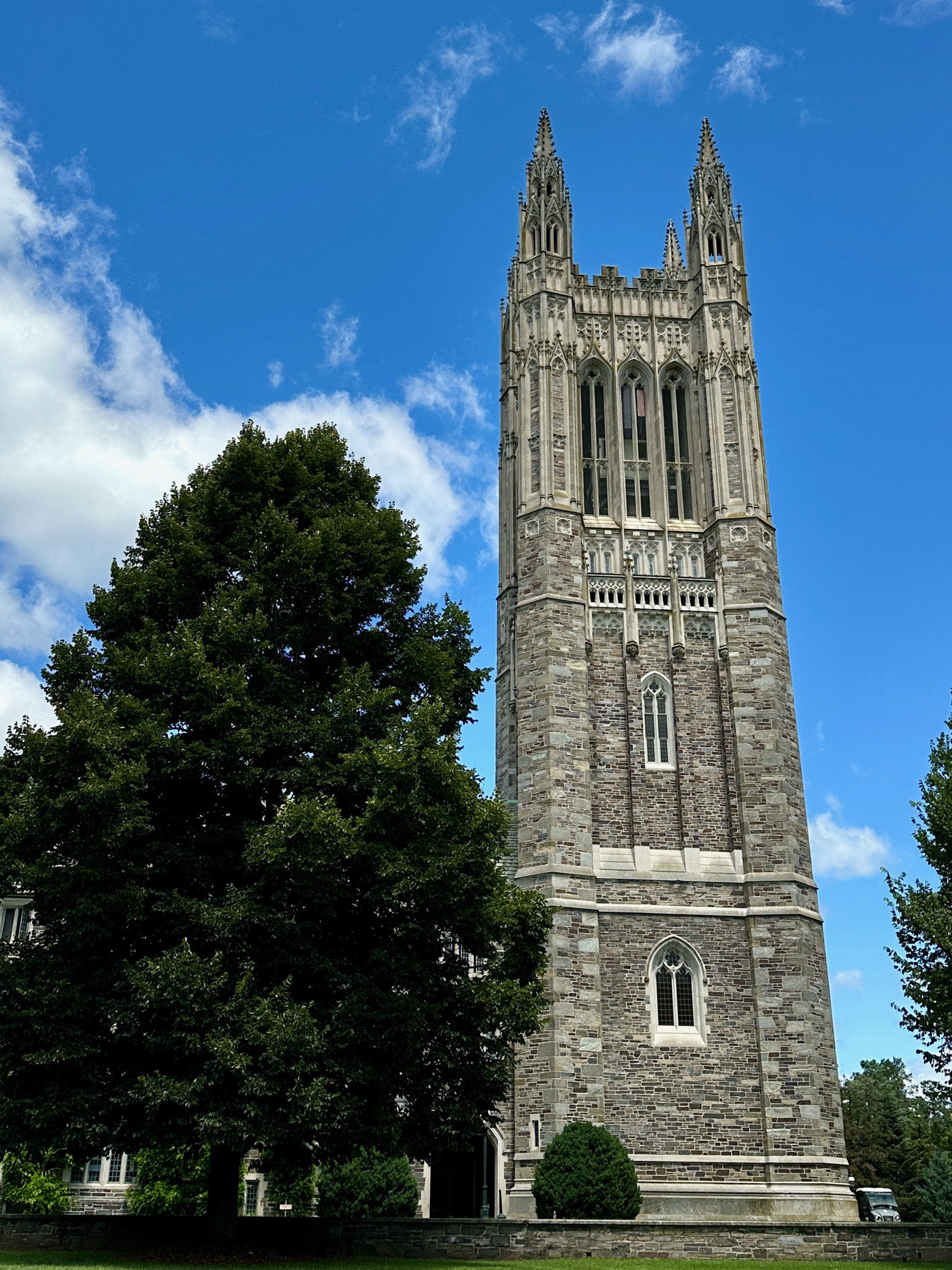
The Cleveland Tower, part of the Princeton University Graduate College

For the 2019–2020 academic year, the Graduate School enrolled 2,971 students. Approximately 40% were female, 42% were international, and 35% of domestic students were a member of a U.S. minority group. The average time to complete a doctoral degree was 5.7 years. The university awarded 318 Ph.D. degrees and 174 final master's degrees for the 2019–2020 academic year.

The Graduate School offers degrees in 42 academic departments and programs, which span the humanities, social sciences, natural sciences, and engineering. Doctoral education is available for all departments while master's degrees are only available in the architecture, engineering, finance, and public policy departments. Doctoral education focuses on original, independent scholarship whereas master's degrees focus more on career preparation in both public life and professional practice. Graduate students can also concentrate in an interdisciplinary program and be granted a certificate. Joint degrees are available for several disciplines, as are dual M.D./Ph.D. or M.P.A./J.D. programs. (Note: The M.D./Ph.D. is granted in partnership with the Robert Wood Johnson Medical School and the Rutgers–New Brunswick Graduate School of Biomedical Sciences. The M.P.A/J.D. program is offered in partnership with Columbia Law, New York University Law, Stanford Law, and Yale Law.)

Students in the graduate school can participate in regional cross-registration agreements, domestic exchanges with other Ivy League schools and similar institutions, and in international partnerships and exchanges.

=== Rankings ===
Academic rankings

National
- Forbes: 2
- U.S. News & World Report: 2
- Washington Monthly: 7
- WSJ/College Pulse: 4

Global
- ARWU: 6
- QS: 27
- THE: 3
- U.S. News & World Report: 14 (tie)

Princeton is one of the world's most prominent research universities, featured at the top of U.S. News & World Report's national university rankings for the ninth consecutive year in 2024, as well as topping comparable lists by Forbes and The Wall Street Journal.

=== Research ===
Princeton is classified among "R1: Doctoral Universities – Very high research activity." Based on data for the 2020 fiscal year, the university received approximately US$250 million in sponsored research for its main campus, with 81.4% coming from the government, 12.1% from foundations, 5.5% from industry, and 1.0% from private and other. An additional $120 million in sponsored research was for the Plasma Physics Lab; the main campus and the lab combined totaled to $370 million for sponsored research. Based on 2017 data, the university ranked 72nd among 902 institutions for research expenditures.

Based on 2018 data, Princeton's National Academy Membership totaled to 126, ranking 9th in the nation. The university hosts 75 research institutes and centers and two national laboratories. Princeton is a member of the New Jersey Space Grant Consortium.

==== Library system ====
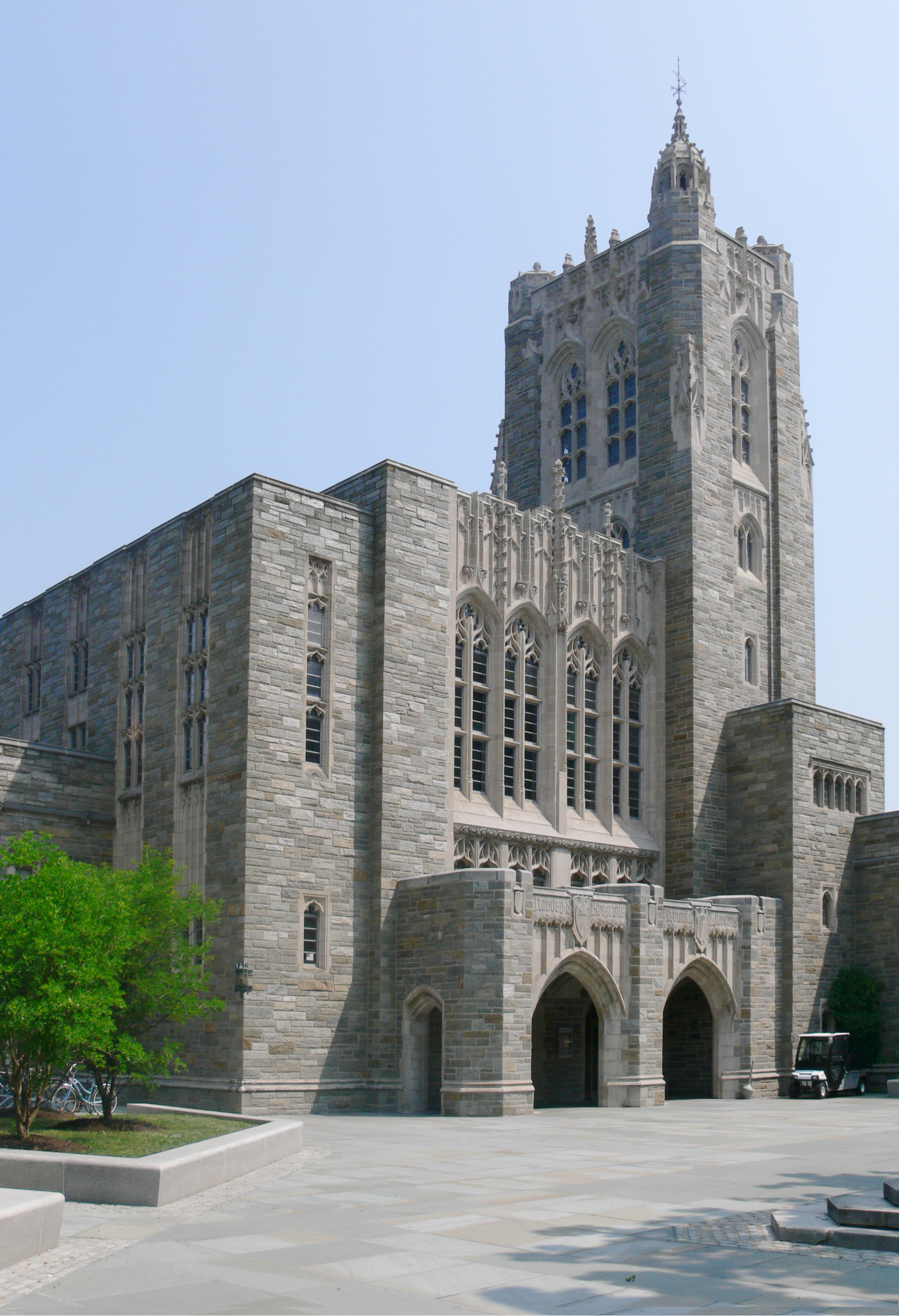
Firestone Library, the largest of Princeton's libraries

The Princeton University Library system houses over 13 million holdings through 11 buildings, including seven million bound volumes, making it one of the largest university libraries in the United States. Built in 1948, the main campus library is Firestone Library and serves as the main repository for the humanities and social sciences. Its collections include the autographed manuscript of F. Scott Fitzgerald's The Great Gatsby and George F. Kennan's Long Telegram. In addition to Firestone library, specialized libraries exist for architecture, art and archaeology, East Asian studies, engineering, music, public and international affairs, public policy and university archives, and the sciences. The library system provides access to subscription-based electronic resources and databases to students.

==== National laboratories ====
The Department of Energy's Princeton Plasma Physics Laboratory (PPPL) stemmed from Project Matterhorn, a top secret cold war project created in 1951 aimed at achieving controlled nuclear fusion. Princeton astrophysics professor Lyman Spitzer became the first director of the project and remained director until the lab's declassification in 1961 when it received its current name. Today, it is an institute for fusion energy research and plasma physics research.

Founded in 1955 and located at Princeton's Forrestal Campus since 1968, the NOAA's Geophysical Fluid Dynamics Laboratory (GFDL) conducts climate research and modeling. Princeton faculty, research scientists, and graduate scientists can participate in research with the lab.

== Admissions and financial aid ==
=== Admissions ===
Undergraduate admissions statistics
- 2022 entering class
- Admit rate: 5.6% (▼ −1.6)
- Yield rate: 69.1% ( −0.7)

Test scores middle 50%
- SAT EBRW: 760
- SAT Math: 790 (▲ +40 median)
- ACT Composite: 35 (▲ +2 median)

High school GPA
- Average: 3.95 (▲ +0.04)

Princeton offers several methods to apply: the Common Application, the Coalition Application, and the QuestBridge Application. Princeton's application requires several writing supplements and submitting a graded written paper.

Princeton's undergraduate program is highly selective, admitting 4.0% of undergraduate applicants in the 2025–2026 admissions cycle (for the Class of 2030). The middle 50% range of SAT scores was 1490–1560, the middle 50% range of the ACT composite score was 34–35, and the average high school GPA was a 3.96. For graduate admissions, in the 2021–2022 academic year, Princeton received 12,553 applications for admission and accepted 1,322 applicants, with a yield rate of 51%.

In the 1950s, Princeton used an ABC system to function as a precursory early program, where admission officers would visit feeder schools and assign A, B, or C ratings to students. (Note: Example feeder schools visited included Phillips Exeter Academy, Phillips Academy Andover, and Groton School, among others. Moreover, an A was likely admission, B was possible, and C was unlikely.) From 1977 to 1995, Princeton employed an early action program, and in 1996, transitioned to an early decision program. In September 2006, the university announced that all applicants for the Class of 2012 would be considered in a single pool, ending the school's early decision program. In February 2011, following decisions by the University of Virginia and Harvard University to reinstate their early admissions programs, Princeton announced it would institute a single-choice early action (also known as restrictive early action) option for applicants, which it still uses. Under this program, students generally may not apply to other private colleges or universities early.

Princeton reinstated its transfer students program in 2018 after a three decade moratorium; the program encourages applicants from low-income families, the military, and community colleges.

=== Costs and financial aid ===
As of the 2021–2022 academic year, the total cost of attendance is $77,690. 61% of all undergraduates receive financial aid, with the average financial aid grant being $57,251. Tuition, room, and board is free for families making up to $65,000, and financial aid is offered to families making up to $180,000. In 2001, expanding on earlier reforms, Princeton became the first university to eliminate the use of student loans in financial aid, replacing them with grants. In addition, all admissions are need-blind, and financial aid meets 100% of demonstrated financial need. The university does not use academic or athletic merit scholarships. In September 2022, Princeton announced that it would cover all costs for families earning $100,000 a year or less, with reduced costs for higher income families as well.

Kiplinger magazine in 2019 ranked Princeton as the fifth best value school in a combined list comparing private universities, private liberal arts colleges, and public colleges, noting that the average graduating debt was $9,005. For its 2021 rankings, the U.S. News & World Report ranked it second in its category for "Best Value Schools".

== Student life and culture ==
=== Residential colleges ===
The university guarantees housing for students for all four years, with more than 98% of undergraduates living on campus. Freshman and sophomores are required to live on campus, specifically in one of the university's seven residential colleges. Once put into a residential college, students have an upperclassmen residential college adviser to adjust to college life and a faculty academic adviser for academic guidance. Upperclassmen are given the option to keep living in the college or decide to move into upperclassmen dorms; upperclassmen still remain affiliated with their college even if they live somewhere else.

Each residential college has its own distinct layout and architecture. Additionally, each college has its own faculty head, dean, director of studies, and director of student life. The colleges feature various amenities, such as dining halls, common rooms, laundry rooms, academic spaces, and arts and entertainment resources. Three of the colleges house both undergraduates and graduate students, while four house only undergraduates, and one houses just graduate students. Present-day residential colleges are:

- Rockefeller College
- Mathey College
- Butler College
- Forbes College
- Whitman College
- Yeh College
- Huo College
- Graduate College

Princeton's residential college system dates back to when university president Woodrow Wilson's proposed the creation of quadrangles. While the plan was vetoed, it eventually made a resurgence with the creation of Wilson Lodge (now known as First College, as the first of the undergraduate residential college system) in 1957 to provide an alternative to the eating clubs. Wilson Lodge was dedicated as Wilson College in 1968 and served as an experiment for the residential college system. In 2020, Princeton University elected to change the name of Wilson College to First College after the recent deaths involving police brutality of black individuals. When enrollment increased in the 1970s, a university report in 1979 recommended the establishment of five residential colleges. Funding was raised within a year, leading to the development of Rockefeller College (1982), Mathey College (1983), Butler College (1983), and Forbes College (1984). Whitman College was founded and constructed in 2007 at a cost of $100 million. Butler's dorms were demolished in 2007 and a new complex was built in 2009. Butler and Mathey previously acted as only underclassmen colleges, but transitioned to four-year colleges in fall 2009. Princeton completed and opened two new residential colleges—Yeh College and Huo College—at the beginning of the academic year in September 2022. (Note: College 7 was initially going to be called Perelman College; however, due to lack of on time payments by the Perelman Family Foundation, the name was removed. As a result, there is no official name for either College 7 or College 8.) The university plans to construct a new residential college named Hobson College where First College currently stands.

Princeton has one graduate residential college, known as the Graduate College, located on a hill about half a mile from the main campus. (Note: The "Graduate College" refers to the residential and dining halls while the "Graduate School" refers to the academics.) The location of the Graduate College was the result of a dispute between Woodrow Wilson and then-Graduate School Dean Andrew Fleming West, who had originally proposed its creation following extensive tours of Oxford, Cambridge, Berlin, and Paris in 1902. Wilson preferred a central location for the college to enable intermixing between undergraduate and graduate communities; West wanted the graduate students cloistered away from central campus. Ultimately, West prevailed through repeated threats by his "friend from boyhood," William Cooper Procter, to rescind funding for the proposed College. The Graduate College is composed of a large Collegiate Gothic section crowned by Cleveland Tower, a memorial tower for former Princeton trustee Grover Cleveland. The tower also has 67 carillon bells, making it one of the largest carillons in the world. The attached New Graduate College provides a modern contrast in architectural style to the gothic Old Graduate College. Graduate students also have the option of living in student apartments.

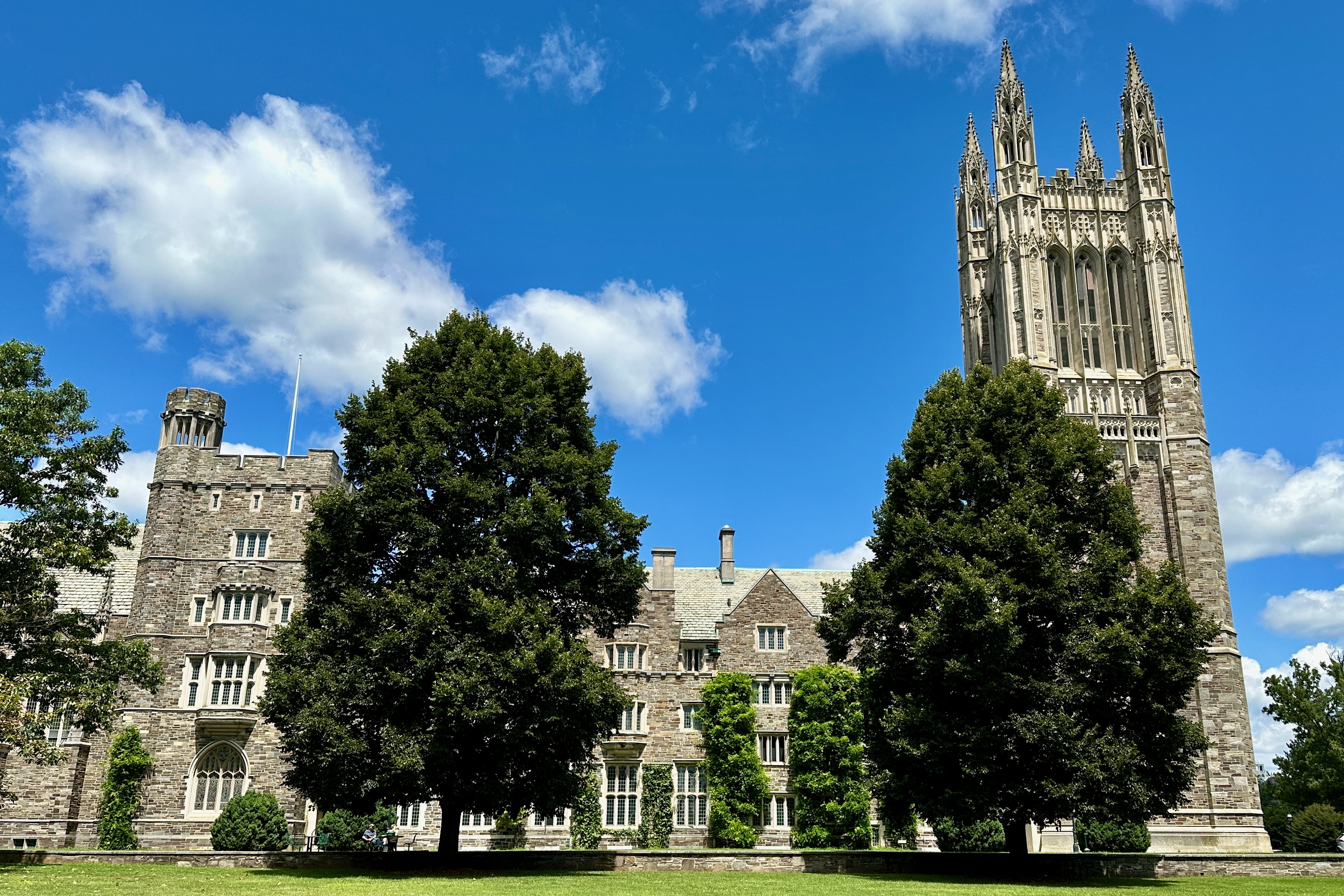
Graduate College (founded 1913)

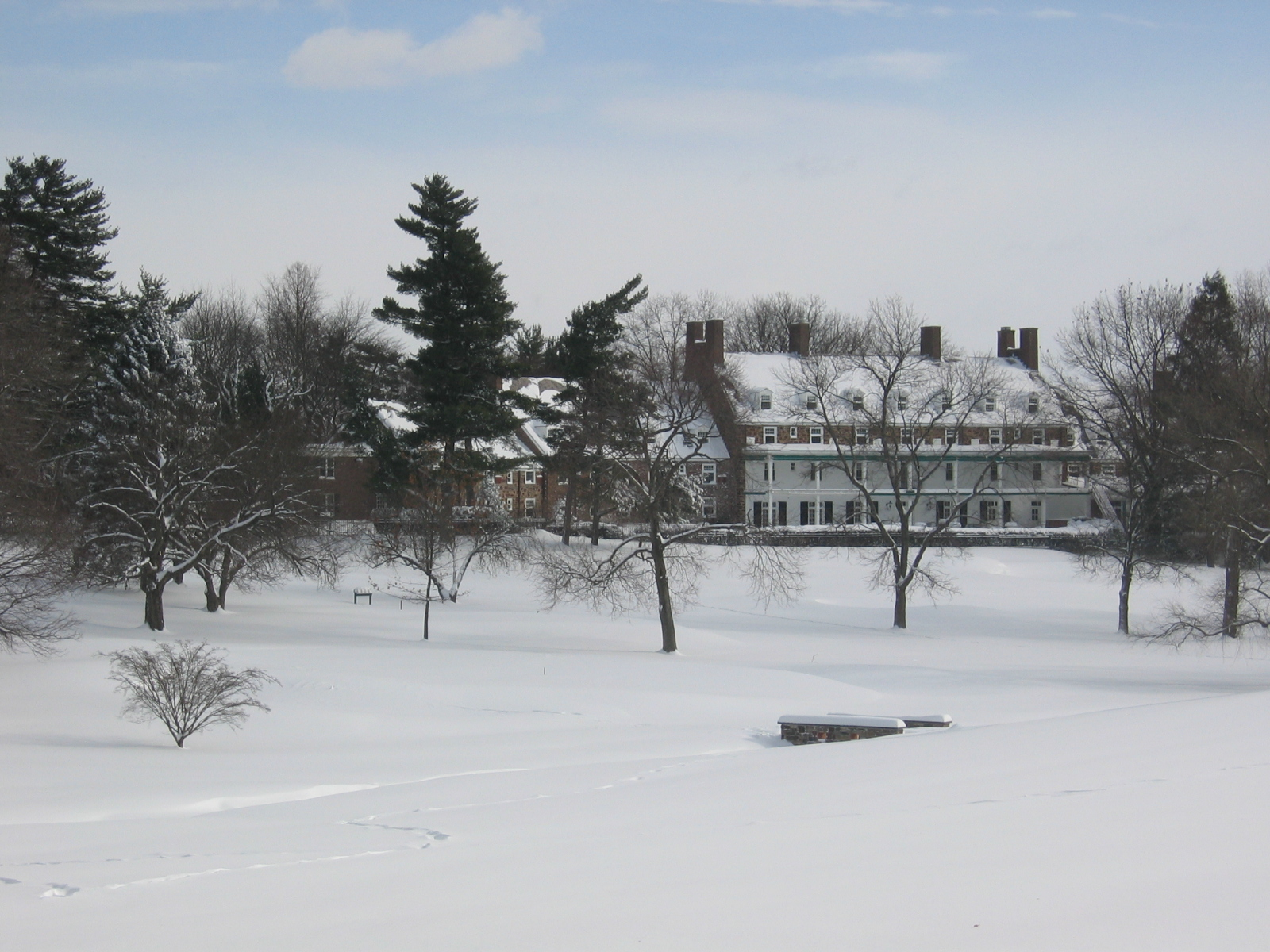
Forbes College (founded 1984)

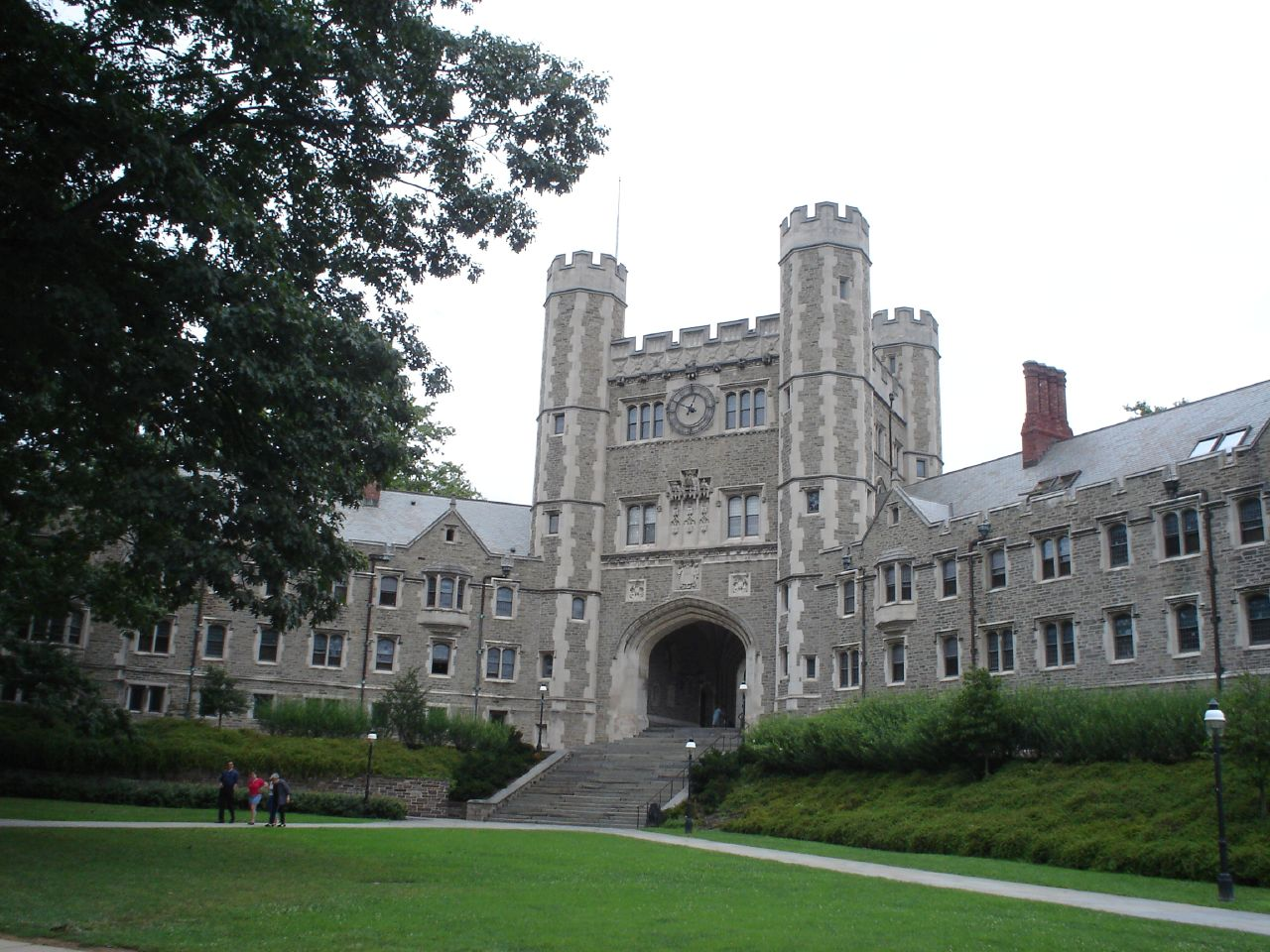
Mathey College (founded 1983)

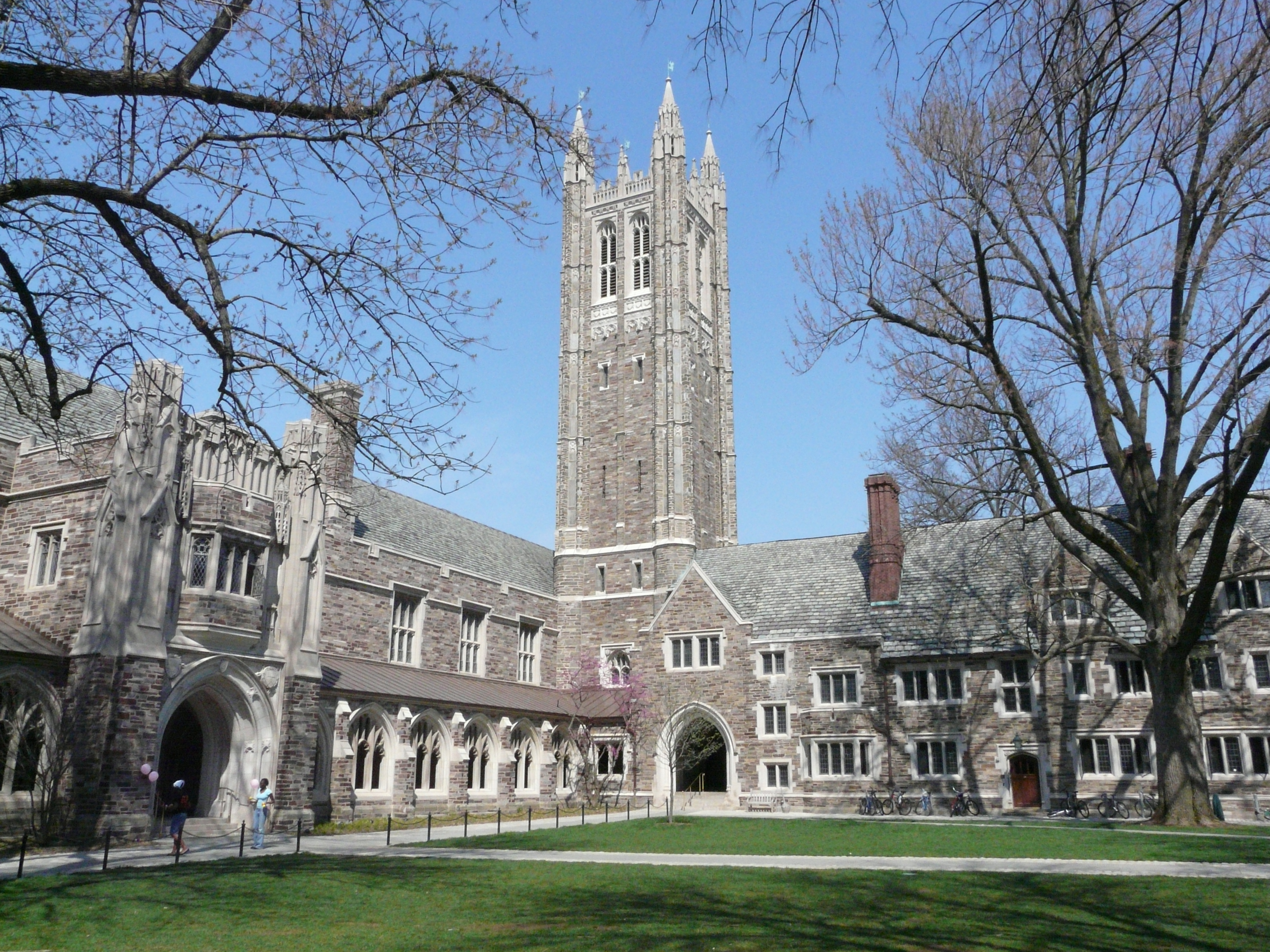
Rockefeller College (founded 1982)

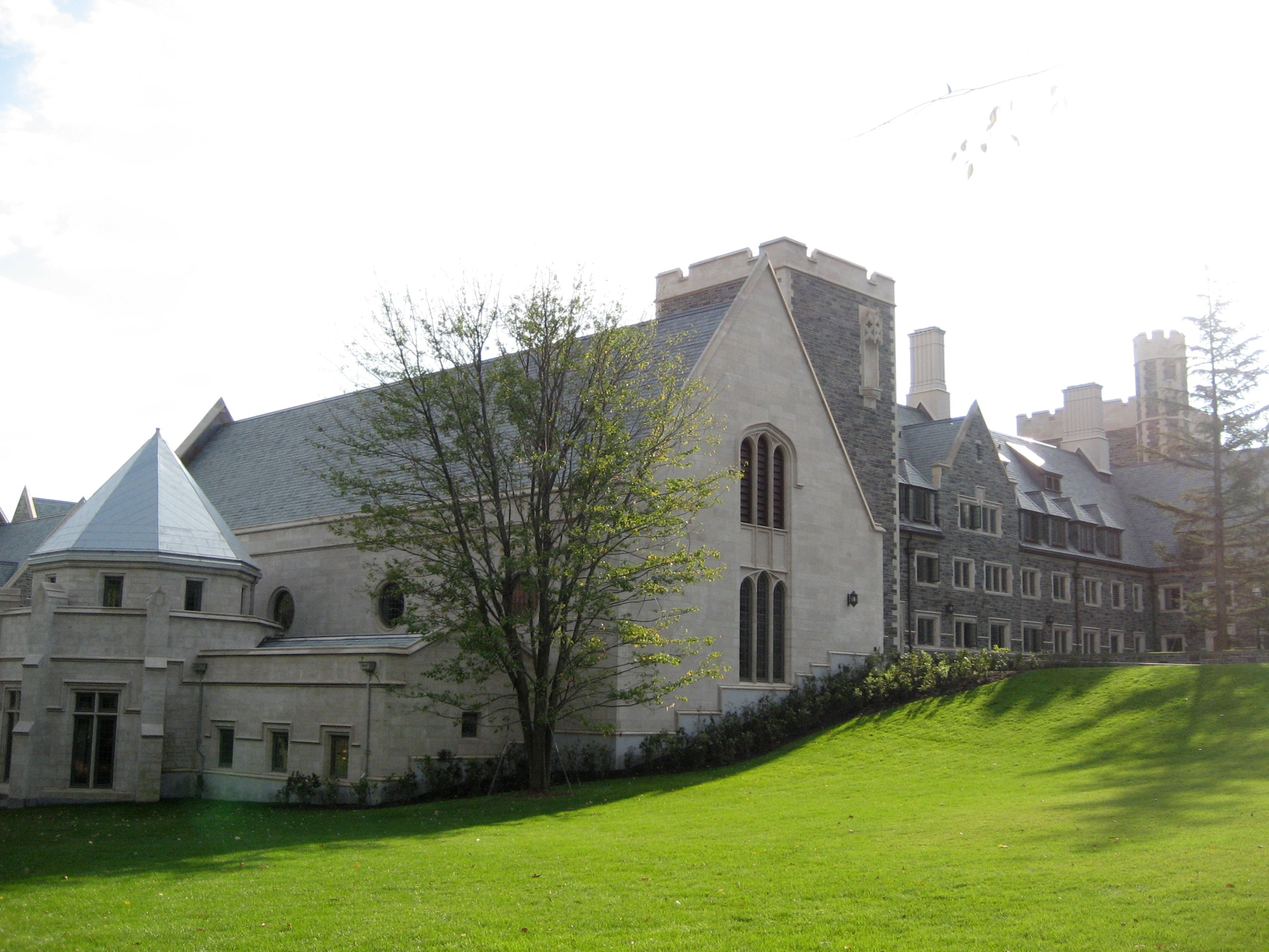
Whitman College (founded 2007)

=== Eating clubs and dining ===
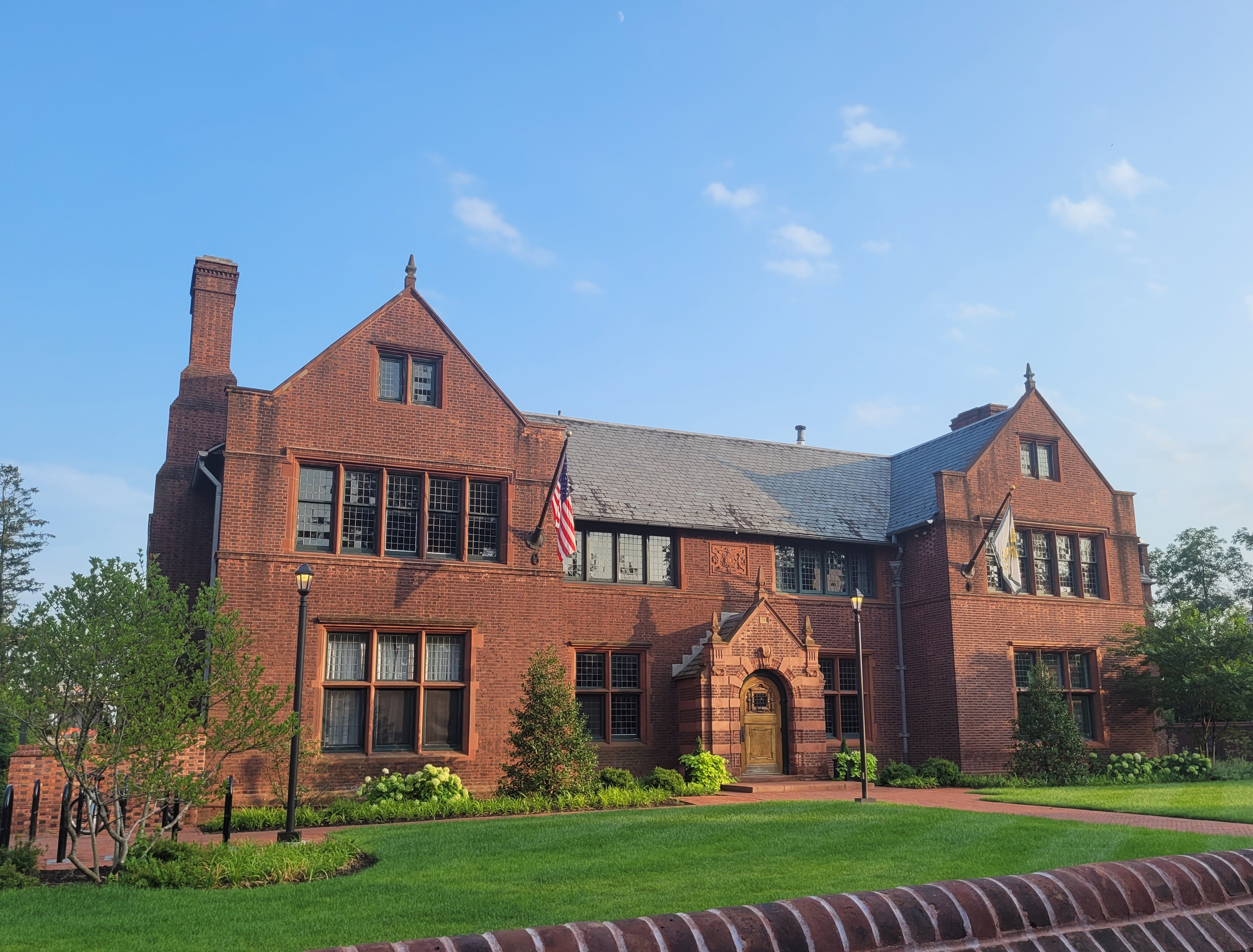
Founded in 1879, Ivy Club is the oldest and wealthiest eating club on campus.

Each residential college has a dining hall for students in the college, and they vary in their environment and food served. Upperclassmen who no longer live in the college can choose from a variety of options: join an eating club and choose a shared meal plan; join a dining co-op, where groups of students eat, prepare, and cook food together; or organize their own dining. The university offers kosher dining through the Center for Jewish Life and halal dining options for Muslim students in the dining halls.

Social life takes place primarily on campus and is involved heavily with one's residential college or eating club. Residential colleges host a variety of social events and activities, ranging from Broadway show outings to regular barbecues. Eating clubs, while not affiliated with the university, are co-ed organizations that serve as social centers, host events, and invite guest speakers. Additionally, they serve as a place of community for upperclassmen. Five of the clubs have first-serve memberships called "sign-ins" and six clubs use a selective process, in which students must "bicker". This requires prospective members to undergo an interviewing process. Each eating club has a fee to join which ranges from around $9,000 to $10,000. As a result, Princeton increases financial aid for upperclassmen, and the eating clubs also offer financial assistance. Cumulatively, there are ten clubs located on Prospect Avenue—Cannon, Cap and Gown, Charter, Cloister, Colonial, Cottage, Ivy, Quadrangle, Tiger, and Tower—and one located on Washington Road—Terrace. Sixty-eight percent of upperclassmen are members of a club, with each one containing around 150 to 200 students

=== Campus organizations ===
Princeton hosts around 500 recognized student organizations and several campus centers. The Undergraduate Student Government (USG) serves as Princeton's student government. The USG funds student organization events, sponsors campus events, and represents the undergraduate student body when convening with faculty and administration.

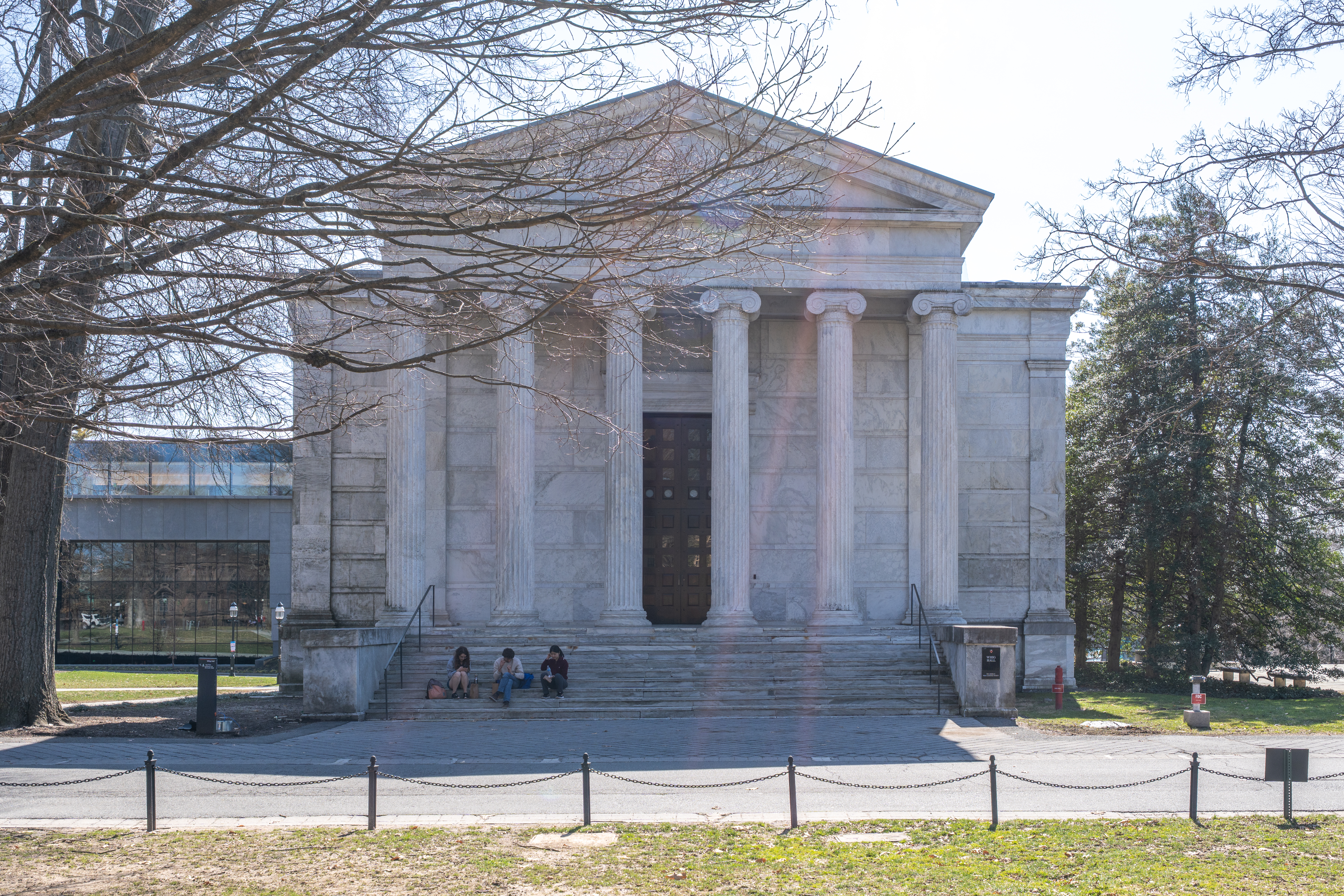
Whig Hall, where the American Whig-Cliosophic Society resides

Founded in about 1765, the American Whig-Cliosophic Society is the nation's oldest collegiate political, literary, and debate society, and is the largest and oldest student organization on campus. The Whig-Clio Society has several subsidiary organizations, each specialized to different areas of politics: the Princeton Debate Panel, International Relations Council, Princeton Mock Trial, and Princeton Model Congress. The International Relations Council manages two Model United Nations conferences: the Princeton Diplomatic Invitational (PDI) for collegiate competition and the Princeton Model United Nations Conference (PMUNC) for high school competition.

There are several publications on campus and a radio station. Founded in 1876, The Daily Princetonian, otherwise known as The Prince, is the second oldest college daily student newspaper in the United States. Other publications include The Nassau Literary Review, the Princeton Tory, a campus journal of conservative thought, The Princeton Diplomat, the only student-run magazine on global affairs, the Princeton Political Review, the only multi-partisan political publication on campus, and the recently revived Princeton Progressive, the only left-leaning political publication on campus, among others. Princeton's WPRB (103.3 FM) radio station is the oldest licensed college radio station in the nation.

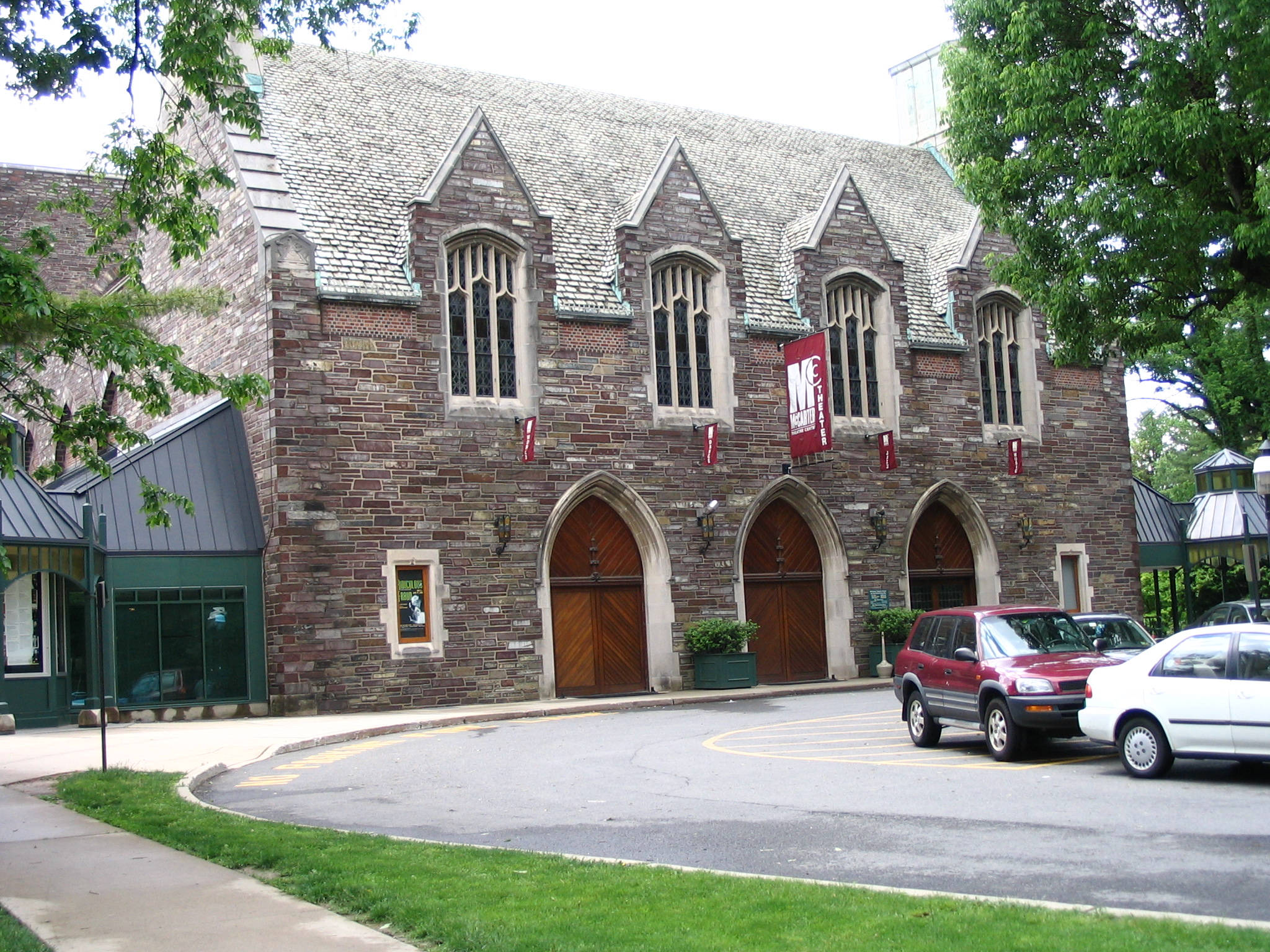
McCarter Theatre, where the Princeton Triangle Club premieres its Triangle Show

Princeton is home to a variety of performing arts and music groups. Many of the groups are represented by the Performing Arts Council. Dating back to 1883, the Princeton Triangle Club is America's oldest touring musical-comedy theater group. It performs its annual Triangle Show every fall at the 1,000 seat McCarter Theatre, as well as original musical comedies, revues, and other shows throughout campus. Princeton's oldest choir is the Glee Club, which began in 1874. The comedic scramble Tiger Band was formed in 1919 and plays at halftime shows and other events. Other groups include the Princeton University Orchestra, the flagship symphony orchestra group founded in 1896, and the Princeton Symphony Orchestra, both of which perform at Alexander Hall.

A cappella groups are a staple of campus life, with many holding concerts, informal shows, and arch sings. Arch sings are where a cappella performances are held in one of Princeton's many gothic arches. The oldest a cappella ensemble is the Nassoons, which were formed in 1941. All-male groups include the Tigertones (1946) and Footnotes (1959); all-female groups include the Tigerlilies (1971), Tigressions (1981), Wildcats (1987); the oldest coed a cappella group in the Ivy League is the Princeton Katzenjammers (1973), which was followed by the Roaring 20 (1983) and Shere Khan (1994).

Princeton features several campus centers for students that provide resources and information for students with certain identities. These include the Center for Jewish Life, the Davis International Center, the Carl A. Fields Center for Equality and Cultural Understanding, the Women's Center, and the LGBT Center. The Frist Campus Center and the Campus Club are additional facilities for the entire campus community that hold various activities and events.

Princeton features 15 chaplaincies and multiple religious student groups. The following faiths are represented on campus: Baha'i, Buddhism, Christianity, Hinduism, Judaism, Islam, Sikhism, and Unitarian Universalism.

=== Traditions ===
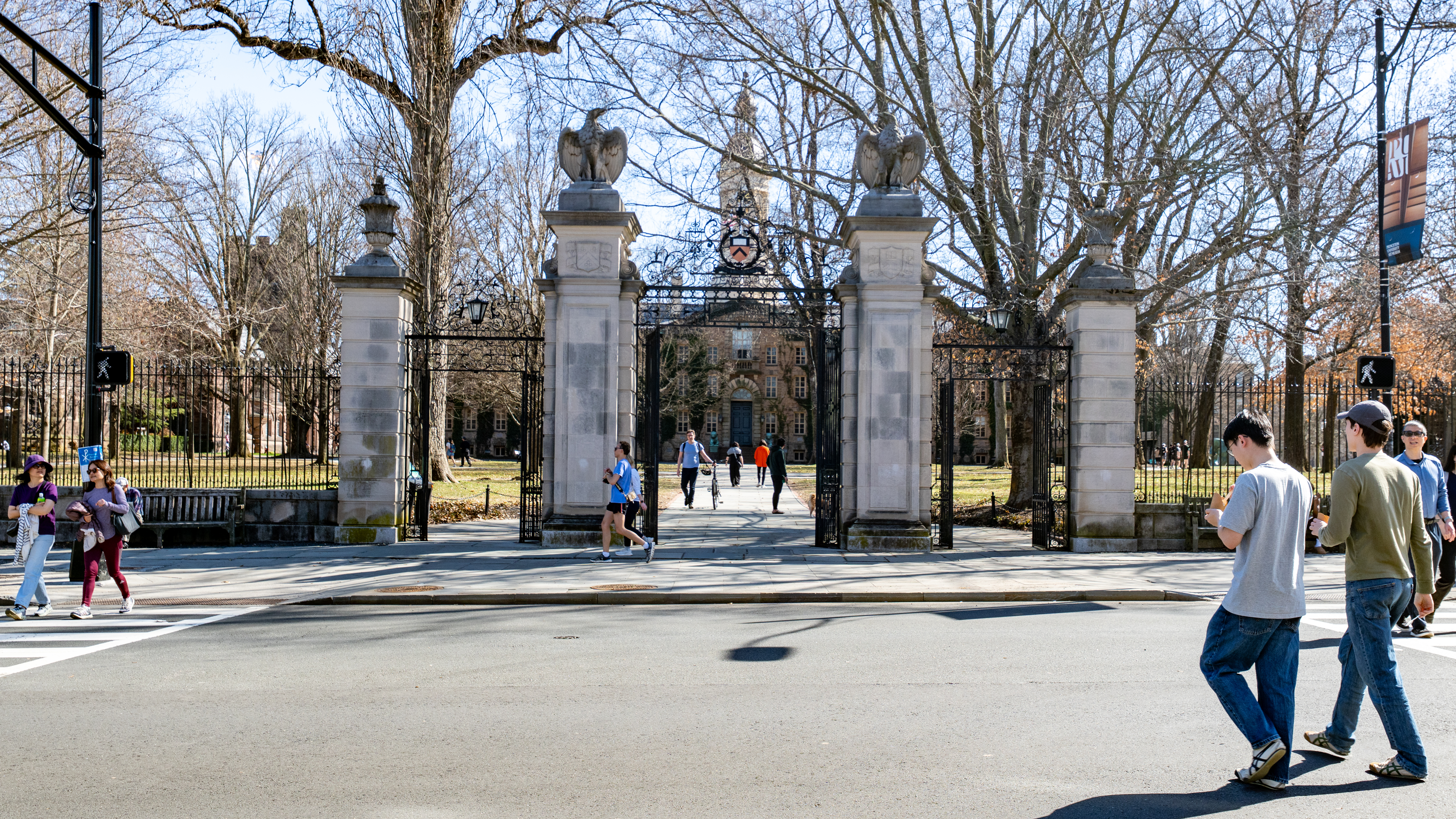
FitzRandolph Gates, which by tradition undergraduates do not exit through until graduation

Princeton students partake in a wide variety of campus traditions, both past and present. Current traditions Princeton students celebrate include the ceremonial bonfire, which takes place on the Cannon Green behind Nassau Hall. It is held only if Princeton beats both Harvard University and Yale University at football in the same season. Another tradition is the use of traditional college cheers at events and reunions, like the "Locomotive", which dates back to before 1894. Princeton students abide by the tradition of never exiting the campus through FitzRandolph Gates until one graduates. According to tradition, anyone who exits campus before their graduation will not graduate. A more controversial tradition is Newman's Day, where some students attempt to drink 24 beers in the 24 hours of April 24. According to The New York Times, "the day got its name from an apocryphal quote attributed to Paul Newman: '24 beers in a case, 24 hours in a day. Coincidence? I think not.'" Newman spoke out against the tradition. One of the biggest traditions celebrated annually are Reunions, which are massive annual gatherings of alumni. At Reunions, a traditional parade of alumni and their families, known as the "P-rade", process through the campus.

Princeton also has several traditions that have faded into the past. One of them was clapper theft, the act of climbing to the top of Nassau Hall to steal the bell clapper, which rings to signal the start of classes on the first day of the school year. For safety reasons, the clapper was permanently removed. Another was the Nude Olympics, an annual nude and partially nude frolic in Holder Courtyard that used to take place during the first snow of the winter. Started in the early 1970s, the Nude Olympics went co-educational in 1979 and gained much notoriety with the American press. Due to issues of sexual harassment and safety reasons, the administration banned the Olympics in 2000, to the disappointment of students.

=== Alma mater ===
Old Nassau

"Old Nassau" has been Princeton University's school song since 1859, when it was written that year by freshman Harlan Page Peck. It was originally published in the Nassau Literary Magazine, where it won the magazine's prize for best college song. After an unsuccessful attempt at singing it to Auld Lang Syne's melody, Karl Langlotz, a Princeton professor, wrote the music for it. In 1987, the university changed the gendered lyrics of "Old Nassau" to reflect the school's co-educational student body.

=== Transportation ===
Tiger Transit is the bus system of the university, mostly open to the public and linking university campuses and areas around Princeton; routes are updated upon community feedback. The service sees an average of 3,500 boardings per day on weekdays and 1,100 boardings per day on weekends. NJ Transit provides bus service on the 600, 606 and 609 lines and rail service on the Dinky, a small commuter train that provides service to the Princeton Junction Station. Coach USA, through their subsidiary Suburban Transit, provides bus service to New York City and other destinations in New Jersey.

== Student body ==
Student body composition as of May 2, 2022
Race and ethnicity	Total
White	36%
Asian	25%
Foreign national	12%
Hispanic	11%
Black	9%
Other (Note: Other consists of Multiracial Americans & those who prefer to not say.)	7%
Economic diversity
Low-income (Note: The percentage of students who received an income-based federal Pell grant intended for low-income students.)	23%
Affluent (Note: The percentage of students who are a part of the American middle class at the bare minimum.)	77%

Princeton has made significant progress in expanding the diversity of its student body in recent years. The 2021 admitted freshman class was one of the most diverse in the school's history, with 68% of students identifying as students of color. The university has worked to increase its enrollment of first-generation and low-income students in recent years. The median family income of Princeton students is $186,100, with 72% of students coming from the top 20% highest-earning families. In 2017, 22% of freshman qualified for federal Pell Grants, above the 16% average for the top 150 schools ranked by the U.S. News & World Report; nationwide, the average was 44%. Based on data in a 2019 article in The Daily Princetonian, 10% of students hail from Bloomberg's 2018 list of "100 richest places", and that the top 20% of high schools send as many students to Princeton as the bottom 80%.

In 1999, 10% of the student body was Jewish, a percentage lower than those at other Ivy League schools. 16% of the student body was Jewish in 1985; the number decreased by 40% from 1985 to 1999. This decline prompted The Daily Princetonian to write a series of articles on the decline and its reasons. The New York Observer wrote that Princeton was "long dogged by a reputation for antisemitism" and that this history as well as Princeton's elite status caused the university and its community to feel sensitivity towards the decrease of Jewish students. In the Observer, several theories are proposed for the drop, ranging from campus culture to changing admission policies to national patterns. As of 2021, according to the Center for Jewish Life on campus, the university has approximately 700 Jewish students. As of 2024, according to Hillel International, there are approximately 450 Jewish undergraduates at Princeton, comprising about 8.6% of the undergraduate student body. In addition, about 250 Jewish graduate students are enrolled at Princeton, comprising about 7.9% of the graduate student body. Consequently, as American Jews are accounting for 2.4% of the total US population, there are 358% more Jews among students at Princeton than Jews among the total US population, which makes Jewish students the best represented minority group at Princeton.

Starting in 1967, African American enrollment surged from 1.7% to 10% but has stagnated ever since. Bruce M. Wright was admitted into the university in 1936 as the first African American; however, his admission was a mistake and when he got to campus he was asked to leave. Three years later Wright asked the dean for an explanation on his dismissal and the dean suggested to him that "a member of your race might feel very much alone" at Princeton University. Princeton would not admit its first Black students until in 1945 when Princeton instituted the V-12 program on campus. In 1947, John L. Howard, one of the four naval cadets admitted to the program, would become the first Black student to graduate with a bachelor's degree.

== Athletics ==
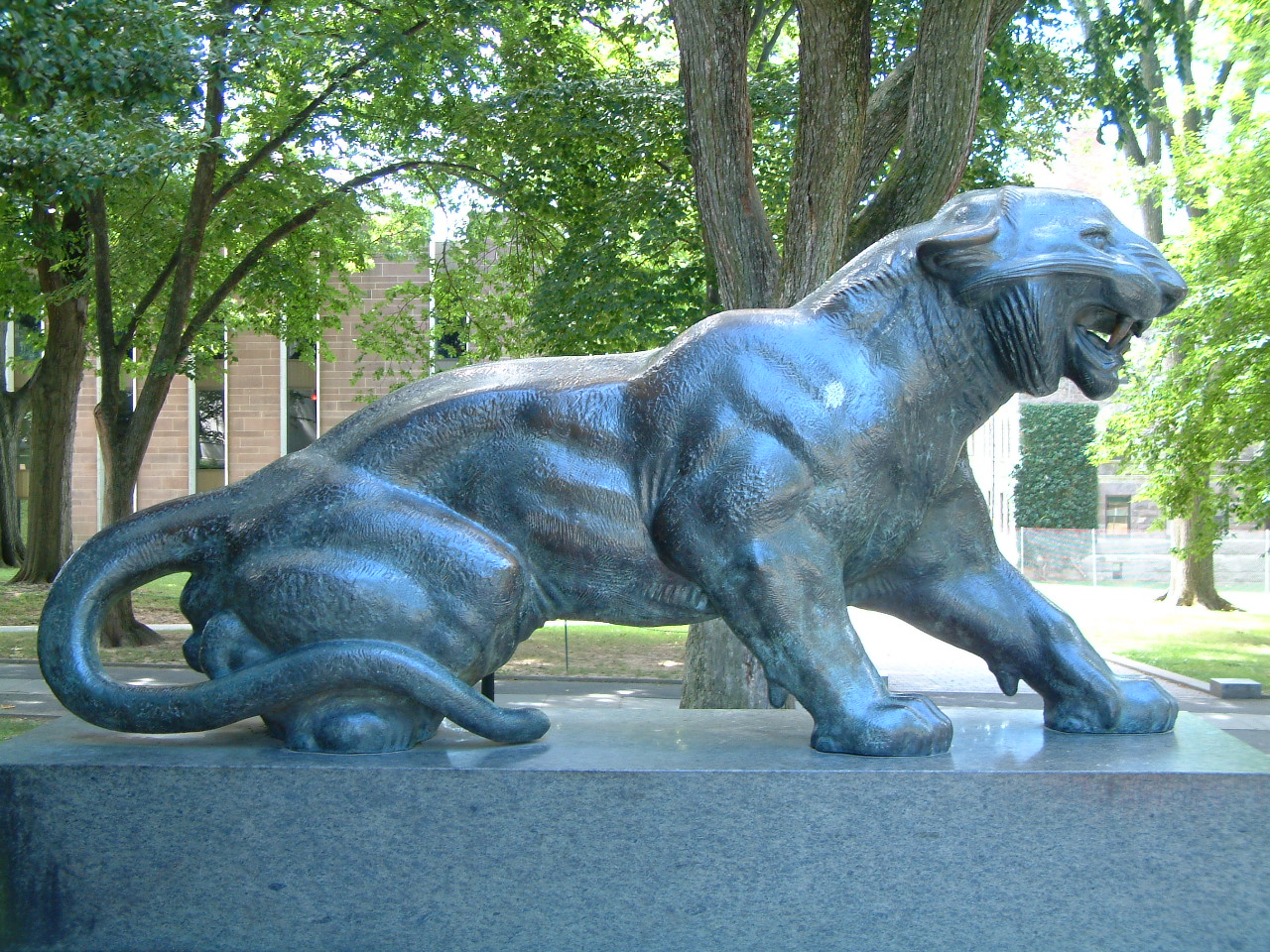
Princeton's mascot is the tiger.

Princeton supports organized athletics at three levels: varsity intercollegiate, club intercollegiate, and intramural. It also provides "a variety of physical education and recreational programs" for members of the Princeton community. Most undergraduates participate in athletics at some level. Princeton's colors are orange and black. The school's athletes are known as the Tigers, and the mascot is a tiger. The Princeton administration considered naming the mascot in 2007, but the effort was dropped in the face of alumni and student opposition.

=== Varsity ===
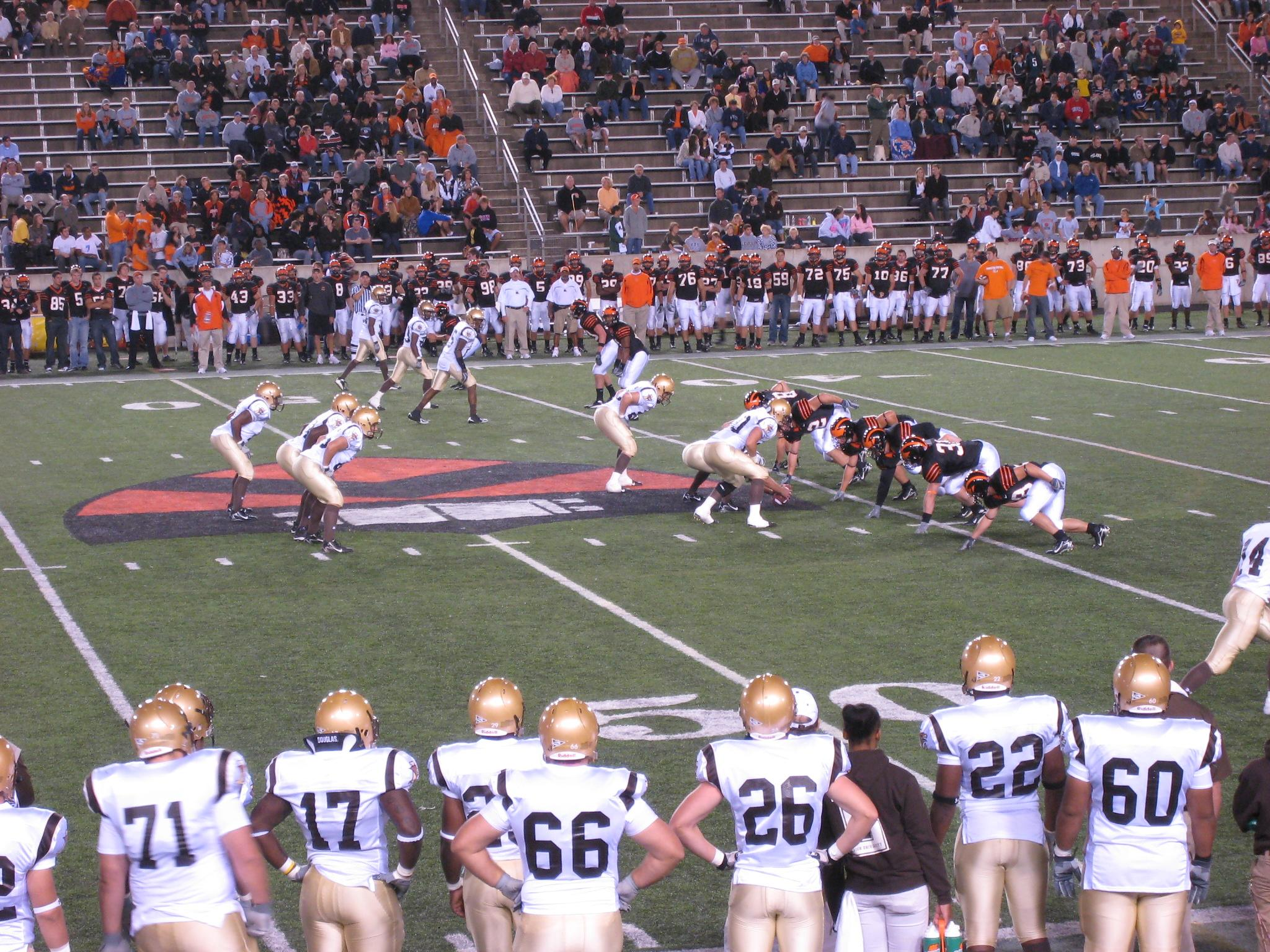
Princeton vs. Lehigh football, September 2007

Princeton hosts 37 men's and women's varsity sports. Princeton is an NCAA Division I school, with its athletic conference being the Ivy League. Its rowing teams compete in the Eastern Association of Rowing Colleges, and its men's volleyball team competes in the Eastern Intercollegiate Volleyball Association. Princeton's sailing team, though a club sport, competes at the varsity level in the MAISA conference of the Inter-Collegiate Sailing Association.

Princeton's football team competes in the Football Championship Subdivision of NCAA Division I with the rest of the Ivy League. Princeton played against Rutgers University in the first intercollegiate football game in the U.S. on November 6, 1869; Rutgers won the game. From 1877 until at least 1903, Princeton played football using rugby rules.

As of 2021, Princeton claims 28 national football championships, which would make it the most of any school, although the NCAA only recognizes 15 of the wins. With its last win being in 2018, Princeton has won 12 Ivy League championships. In 1951, Dick Kazmaier won Princeton its only Heisman Trophy, the last to come from the Ivy League.

The men's basketball program is noted for its success under Pete Carril, the head coach from 1967 to 1996. During this time, Princeton won 13 Ivy League titles and made 11 NCAA tournament appearances. Carril introduced the Princeton offense, an offensive strategy that has since been adopted by a number of college and professional basketball teams. Carril's final victory at Princeton came when the Tigers beat UCLA, the defending national champion, in the opening round of the 1996 NCAA tournament. On December 14, 2005, Princeton tied the record for the fewest points in a Division I game since the institution of the three-point line in 1986–87, when the Tigers scored 21 points in a loss against Monmouth University.

Princeton women's soccer team advanced to the NCAA Division I Women's Soccer Championship semi-finals in 2004, becoming the first Ivy League team to do so in a 64 team setting. The men's soccer team was coached from 1984 to 1995 by Princeton alumnus and future United States men's national team manager Bob Bradley, who lead the Tigers to win two Ivy League titles and make an appearance at the NCAA Final Four in 1993. Princeton's men's lacrosse program undertook a period of notable success from 1992 to 2001, during which time it won six national championships. In 2012, its field hockey team became the first in the Ivy League to win a national championship.

Princeton has won at least one Ivy League title every year since 1957, and it became the first university in its conference to win over 500 Ivy League athletic championships. From 1896 to 2018, 113 athletes from Princeton have competed in the Olympics, winning 19 gold medals, 24 silver medals, and 23 bronze medals.

=== Club and intramural ===
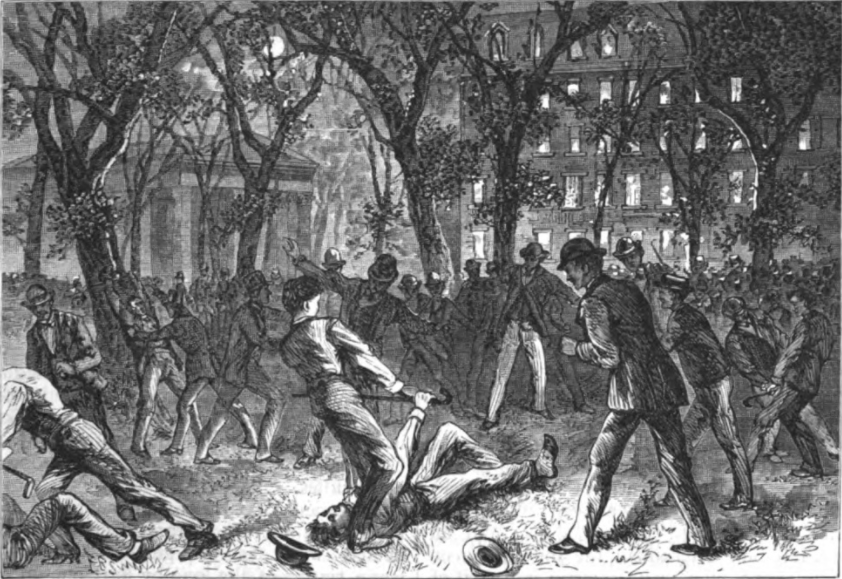
The annual Cane Spree, depicted in 1877

In addition to varsity sports, Princeton hosts 37 club sports teams, which are open to all Princeton students of any skill level. Teams compete against other collegiate teams both in the Northeast and nationally. The intramural sports program is also available on campus, which schedules competitions between residential colleges, eating clubs, independent groups, students, and faculty and staff. Several leagues with differing levels of competitiveness are available.

In the fall, freshman and sophomores participate in the intramural athletic competition called Cane Spree. Although the event centers on cane wrestling, freshman and sophomores compete in other sports and competitions. This commemorates a time in the 1870s when sophomores, angry with the freshmen who strutted around with fancy canes, stole all of the canes from the freshmen, hitting them with their own canes in the process.

== Notable people ==
=== Alumni ===
Notable Princeton alumni include:

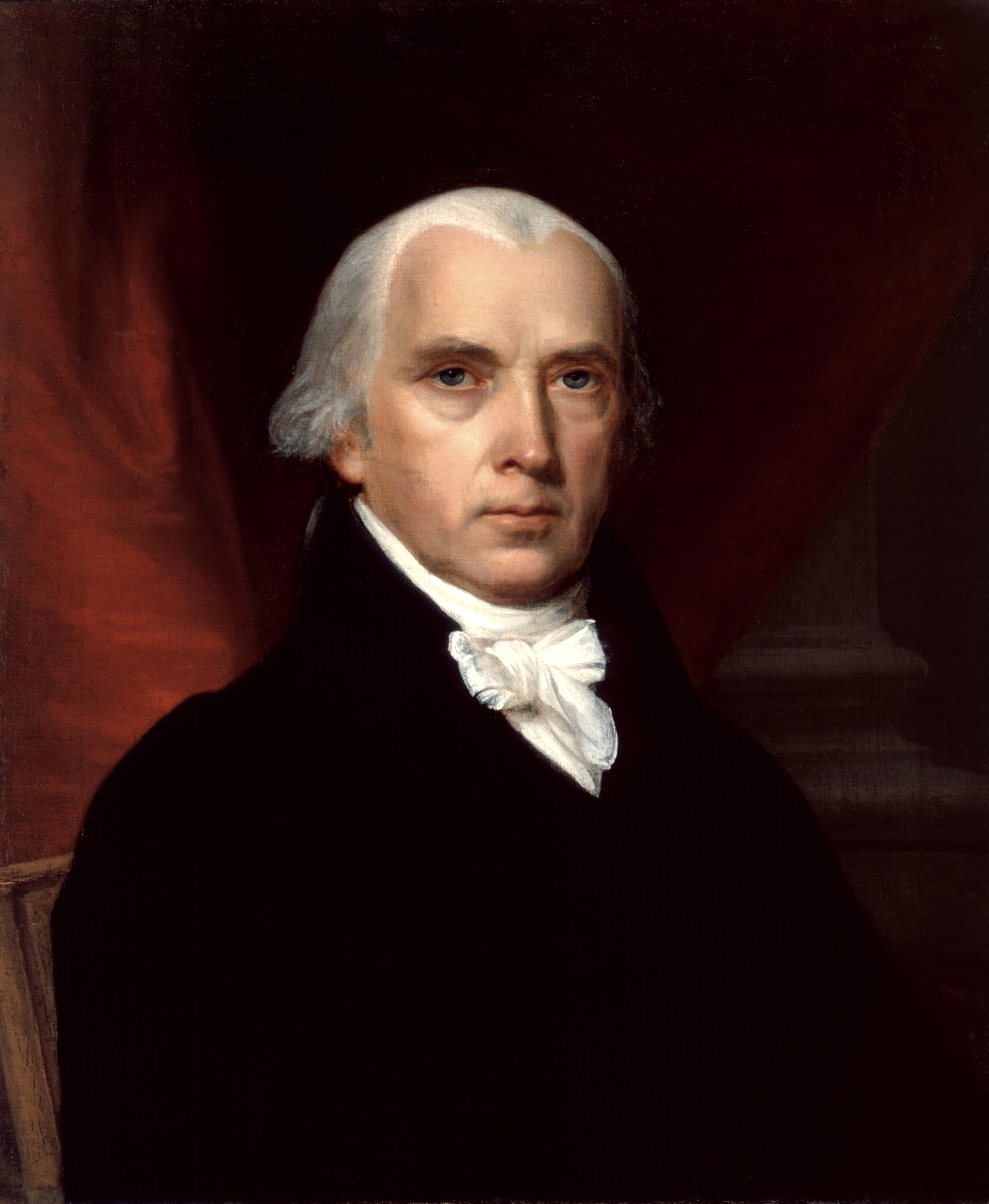
James Madison (A.B. 1771)

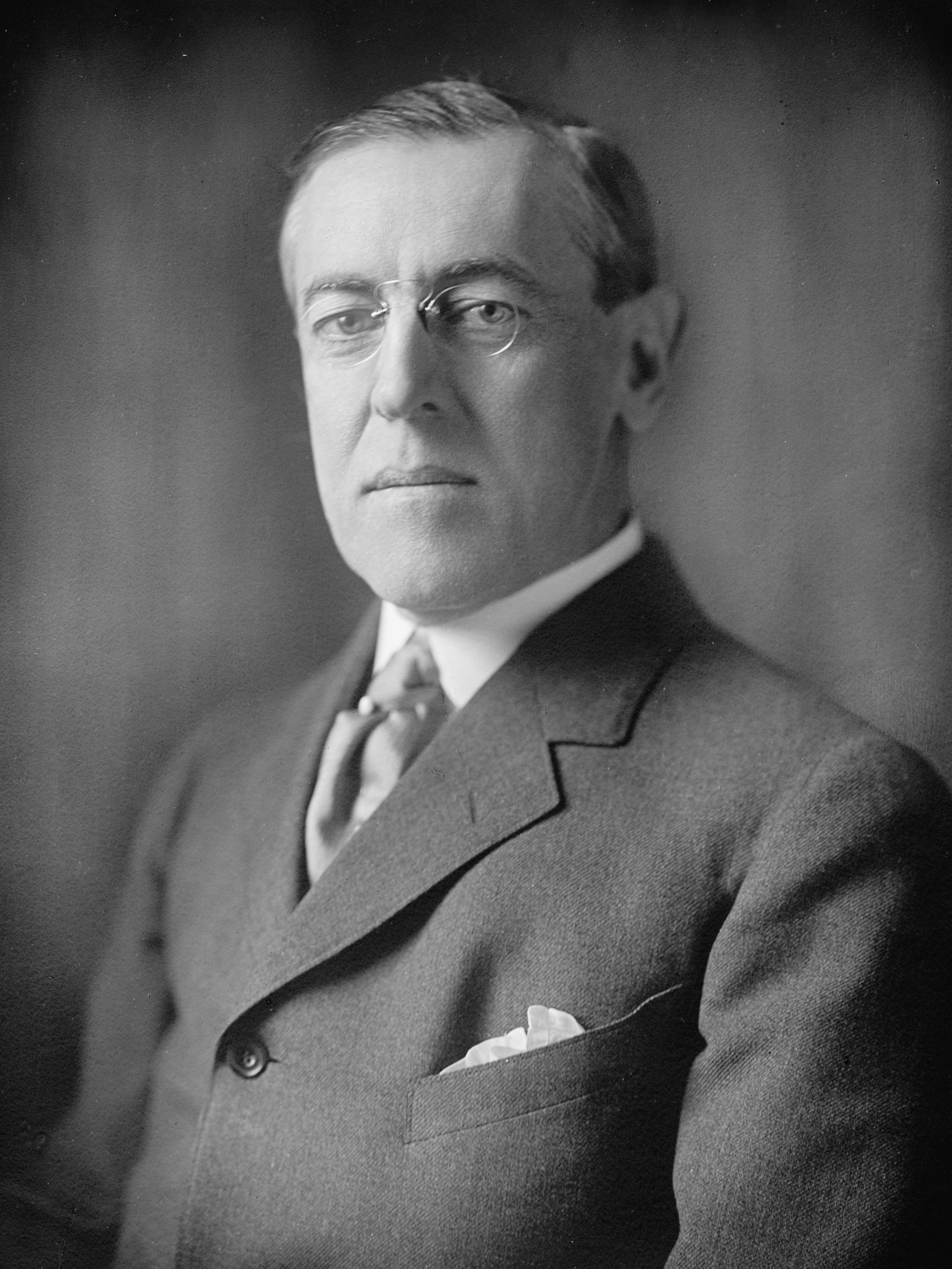
Woodrow Wilson (A.B. 1879)

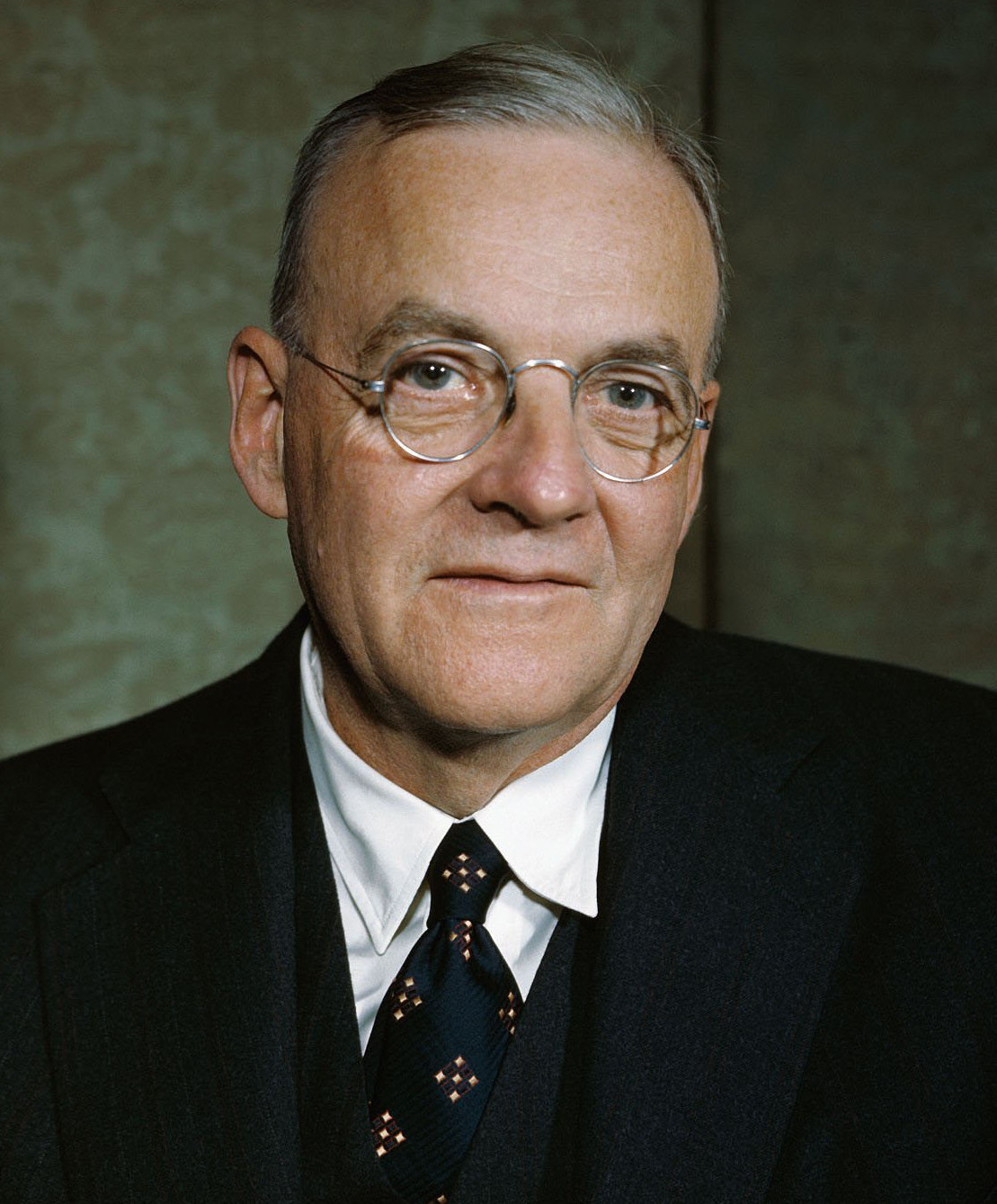
John Foster Dulles (A.B. 1908)

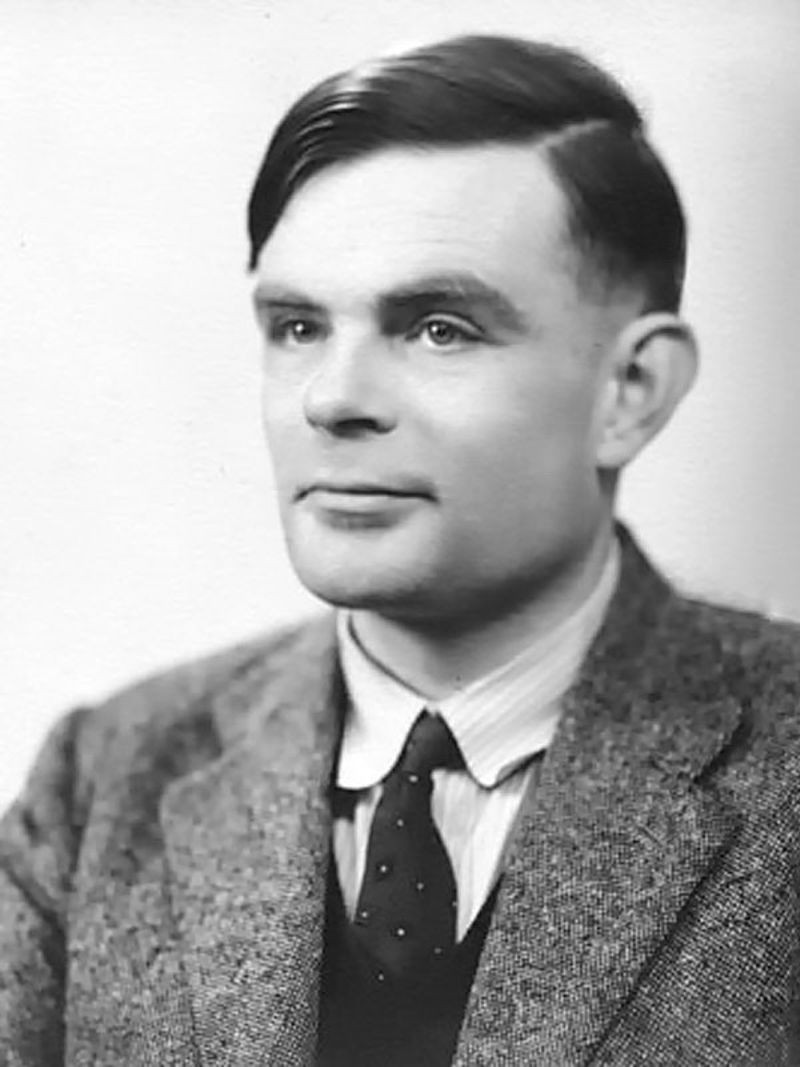
Alan Turing (Ph.D. 1938)

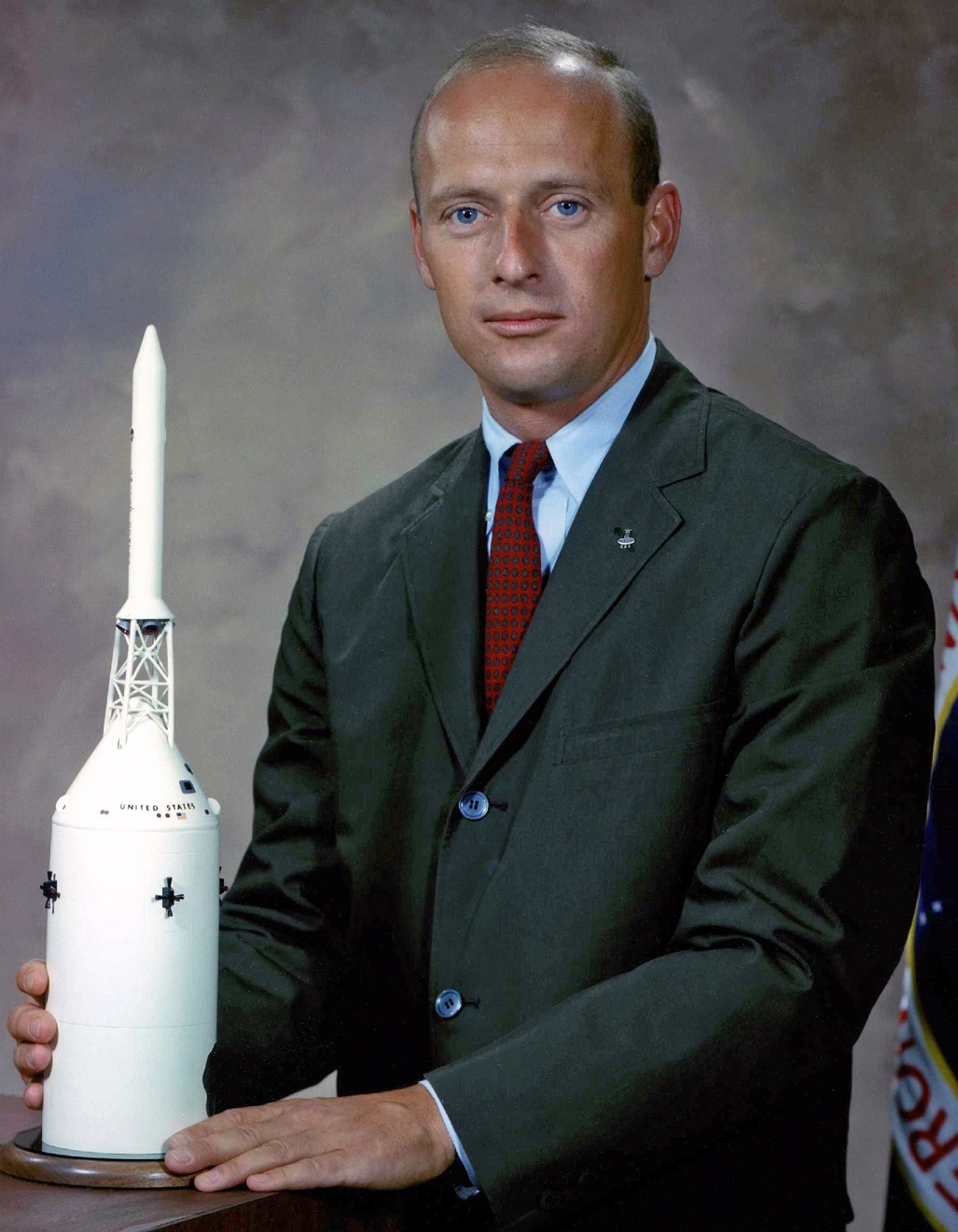
Pete Conrad (B.S. 1953)

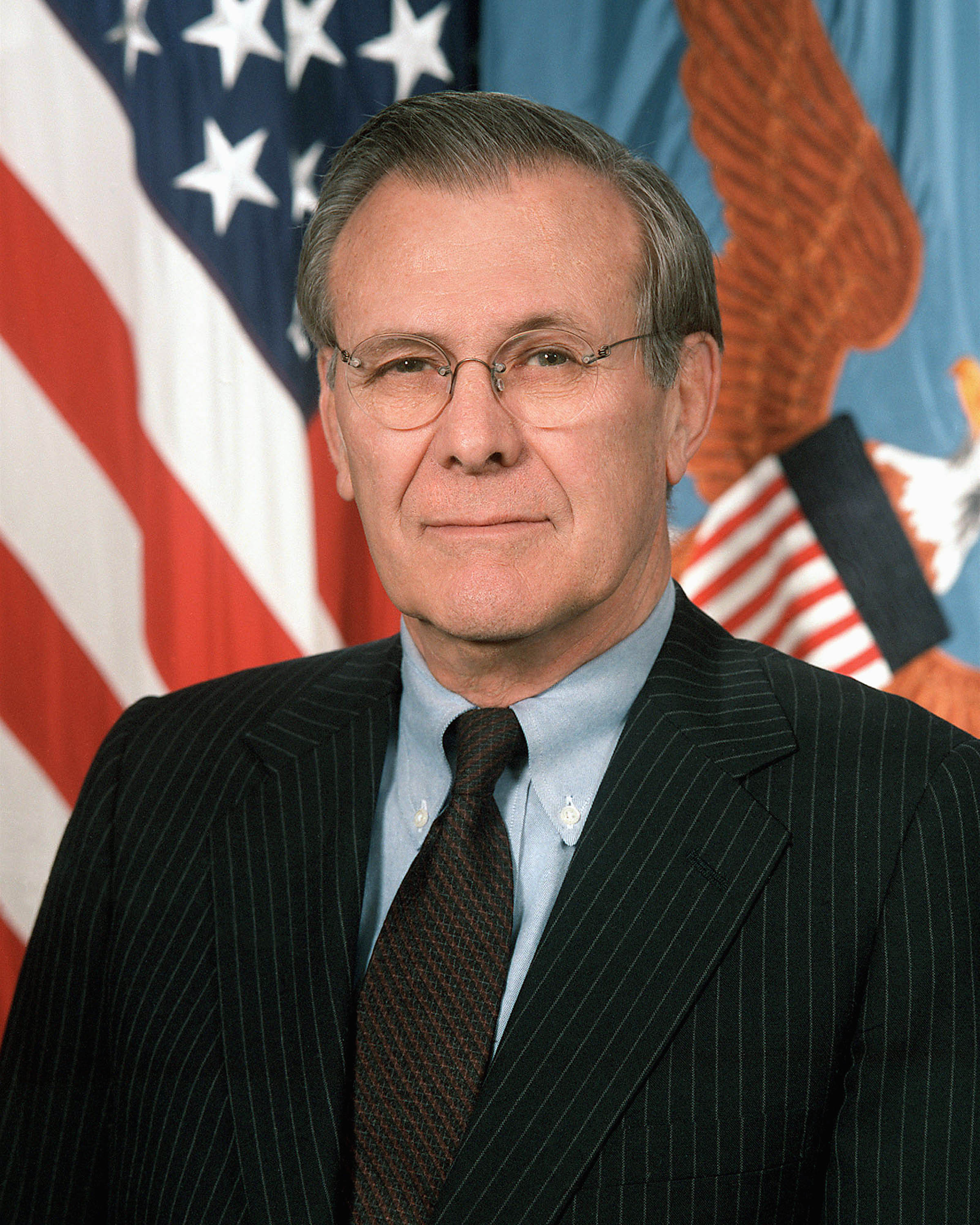
Donald Rumsfeld (A.B. 1954)

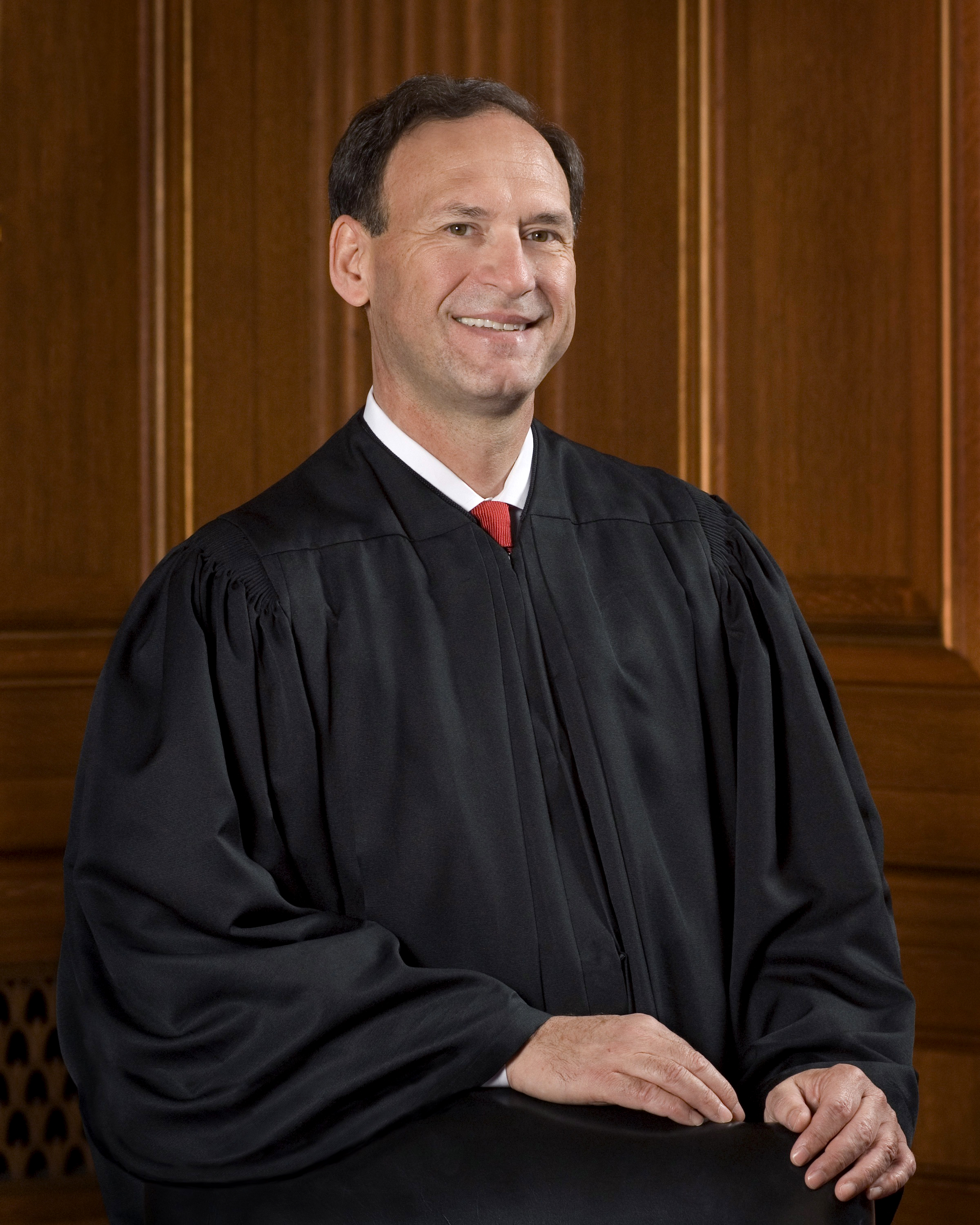
Samuel Alito (A.B. 1972)

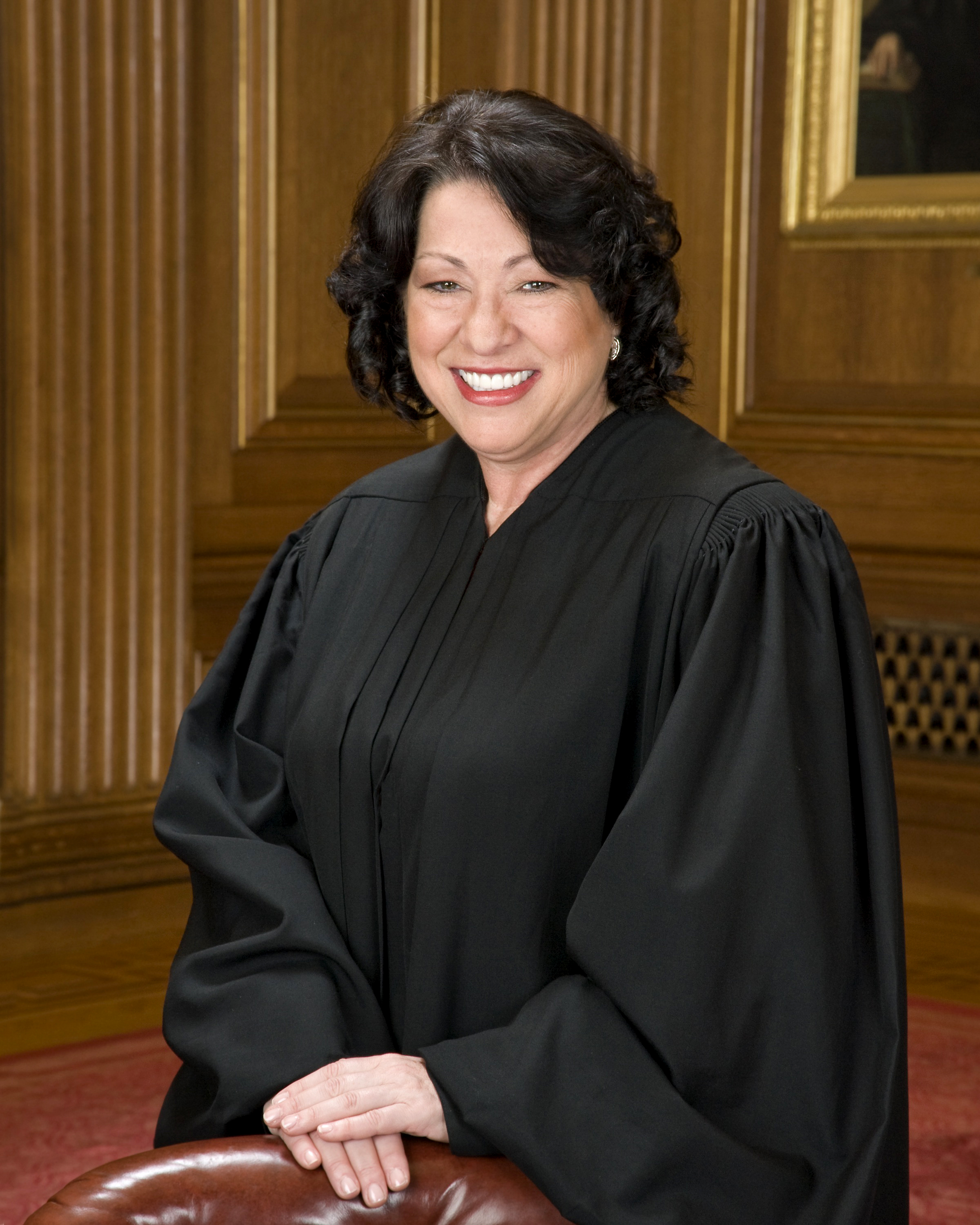
Sonia Sotomayor (A.B. 1976)

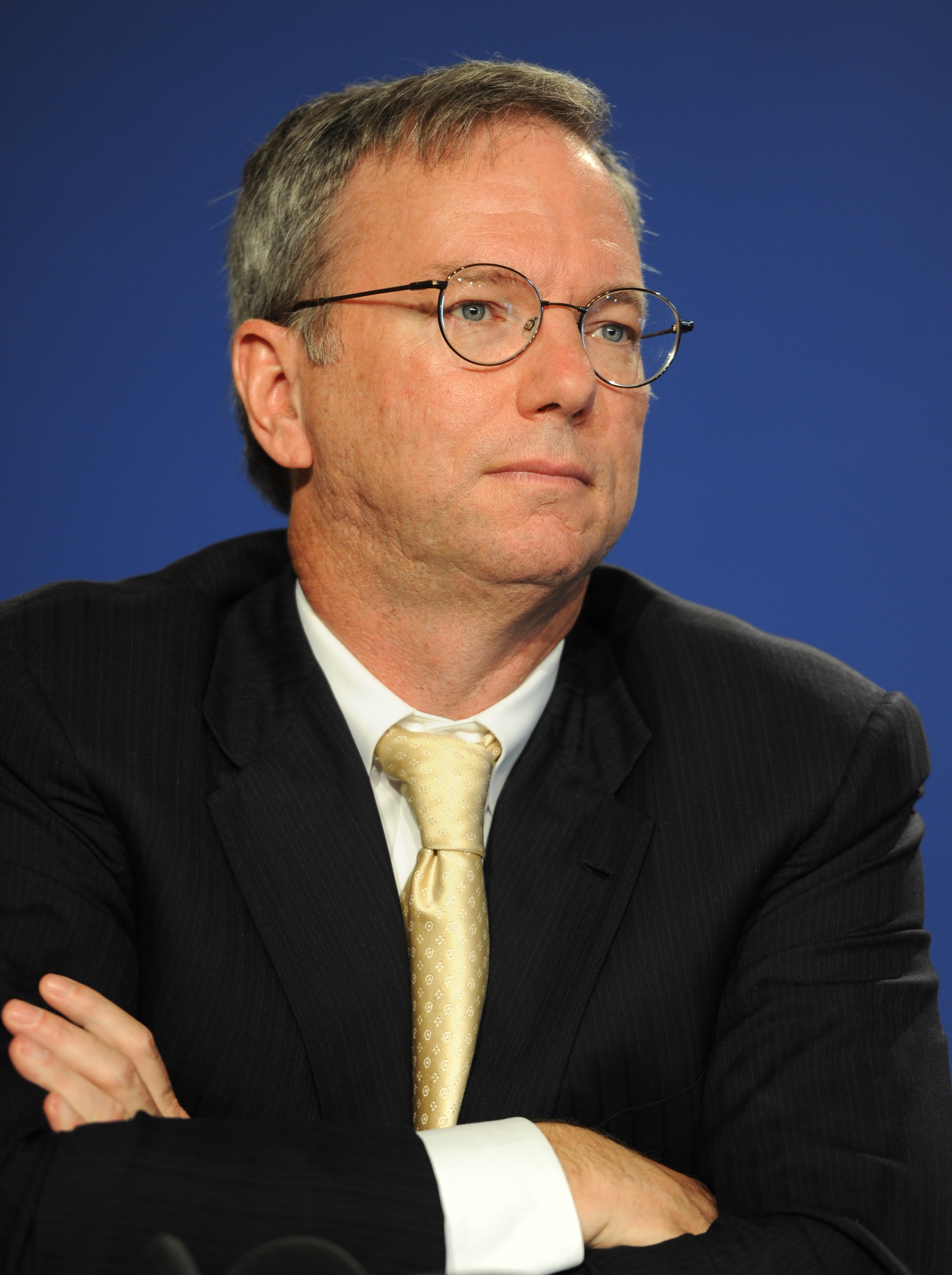
Eric Schmidt (B.S.E. 1976)

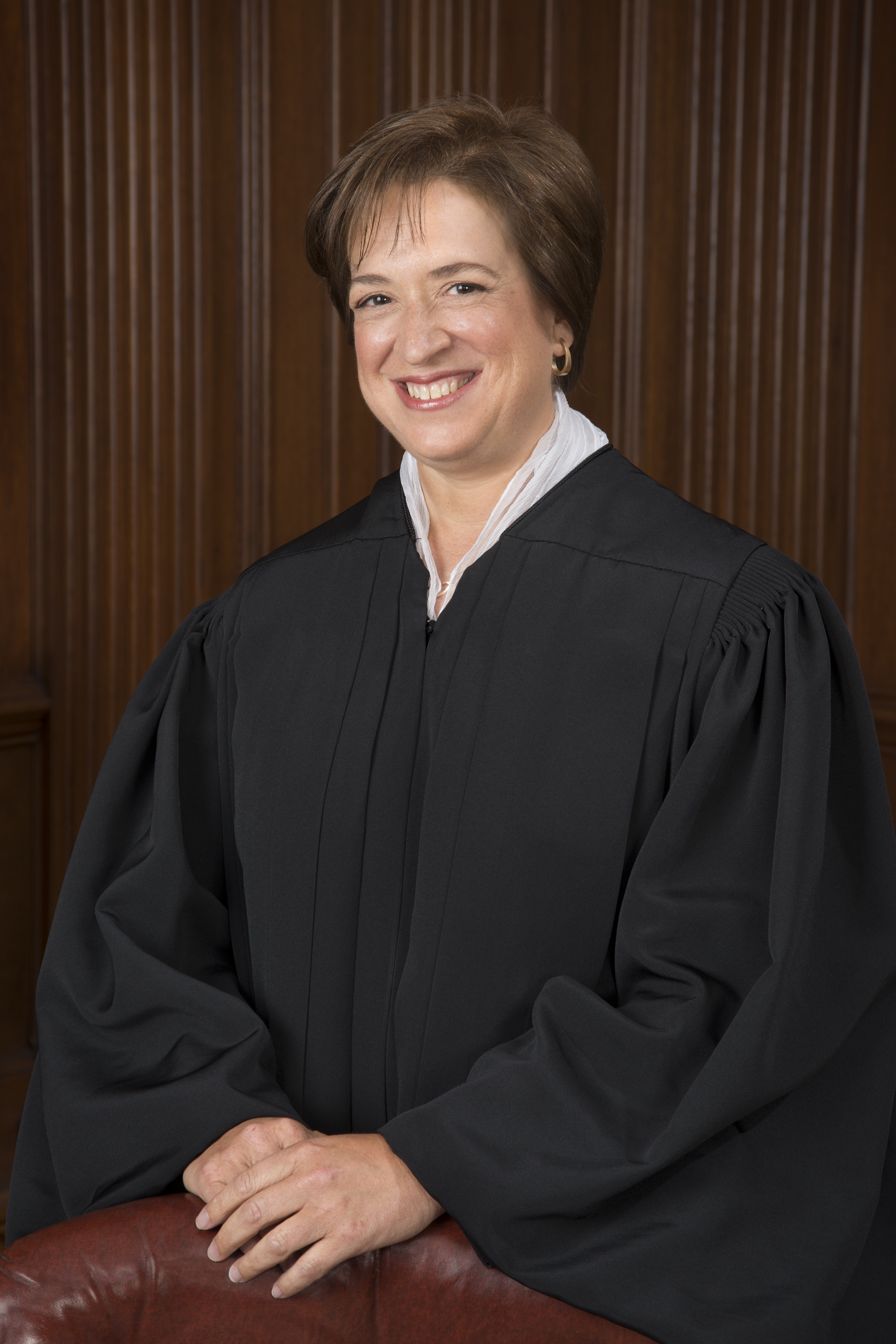
Elena Kagan (A.B. 1981)

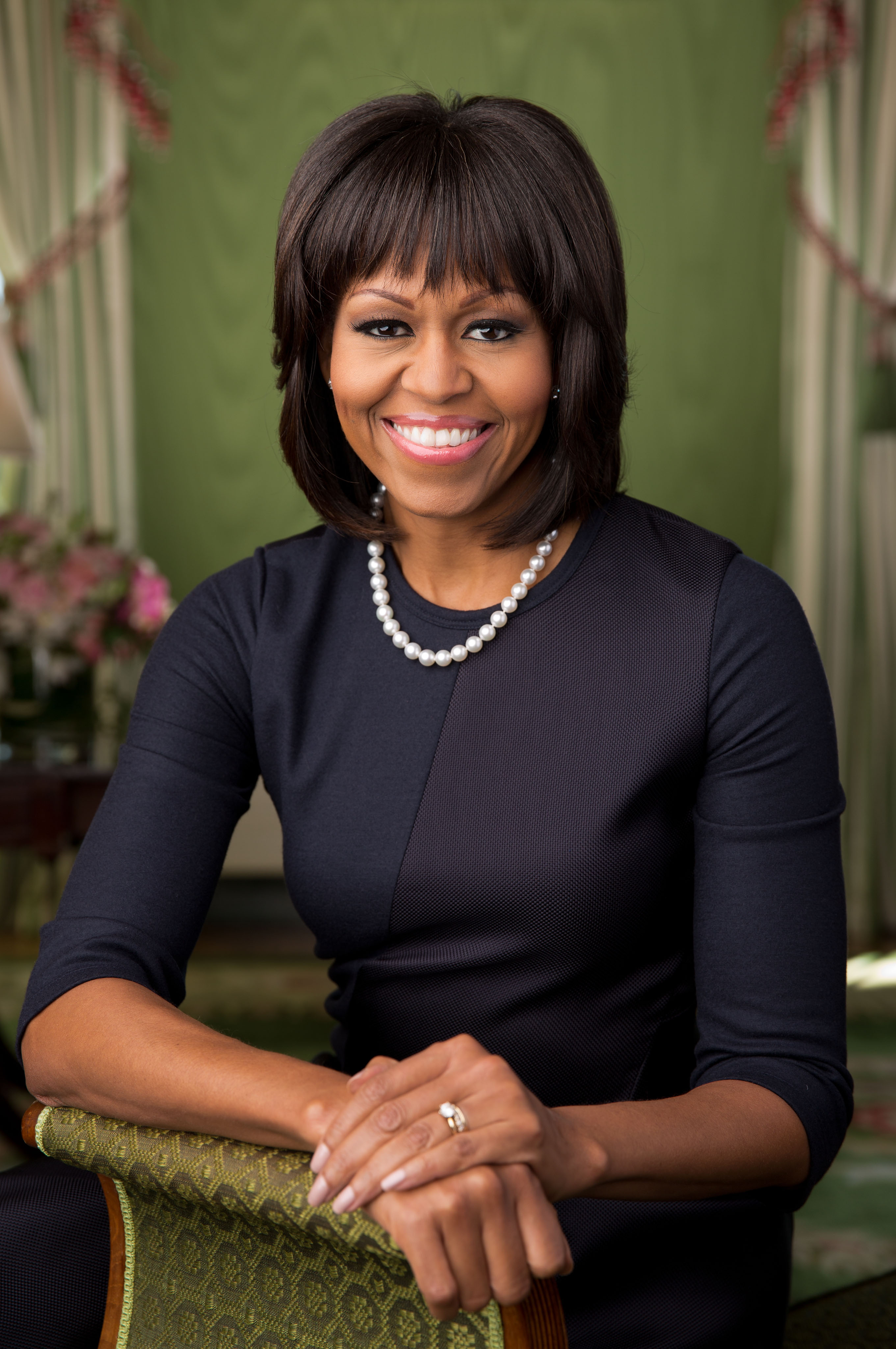
Michelle Obama (A.B. 1985)

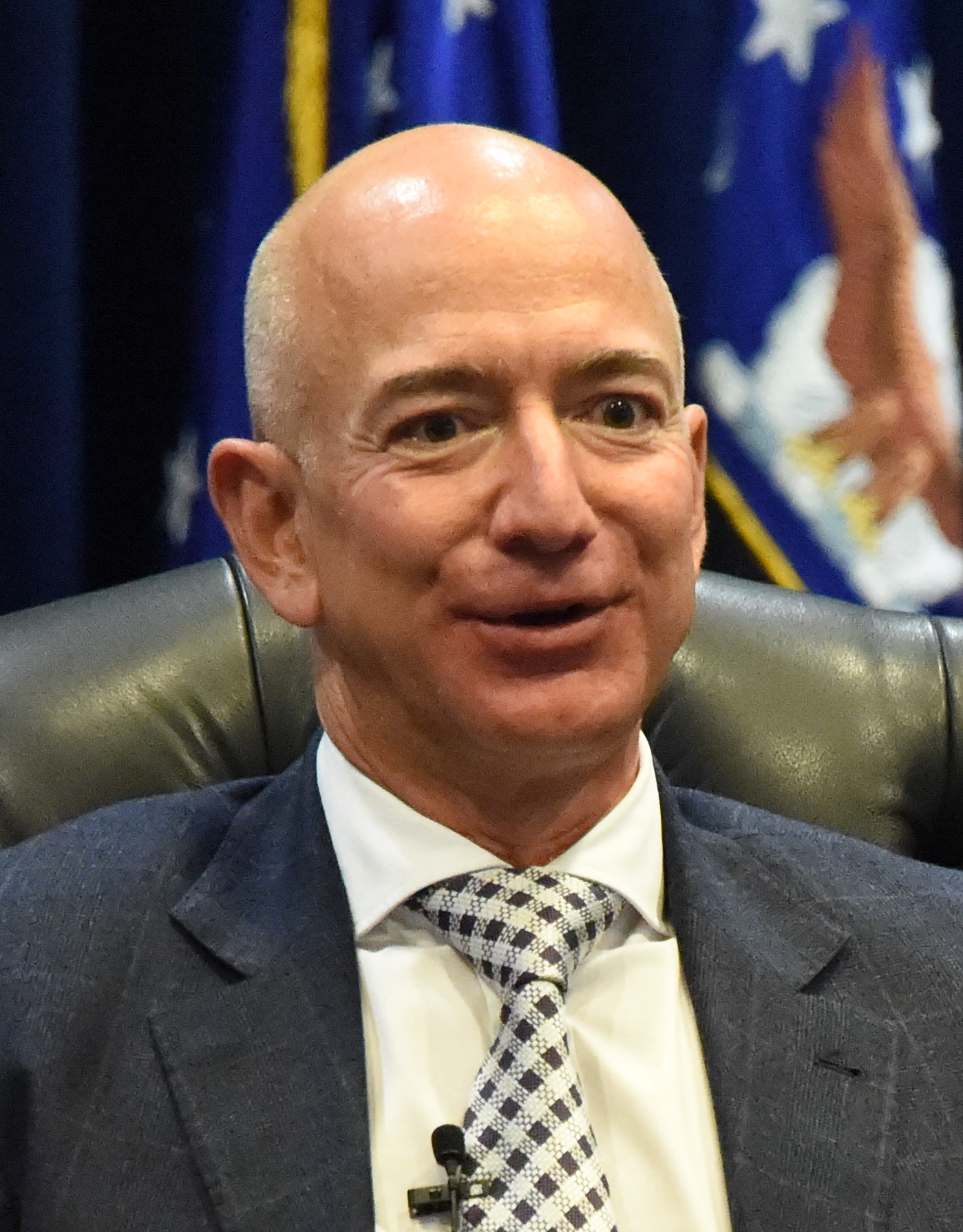
Jeff Bezos (B.S.E. 1986)

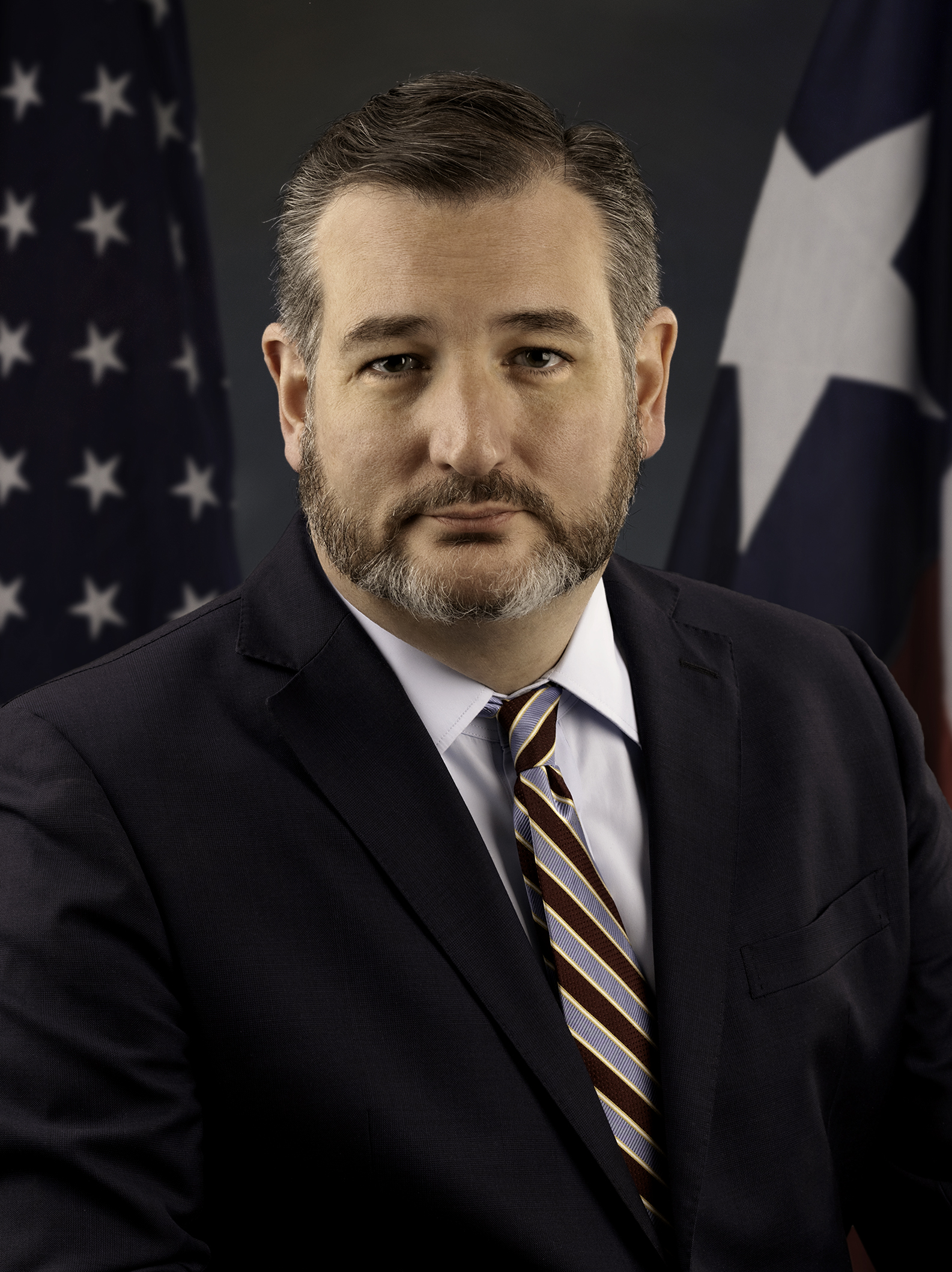
Ted Cruz (A.B. 1992)

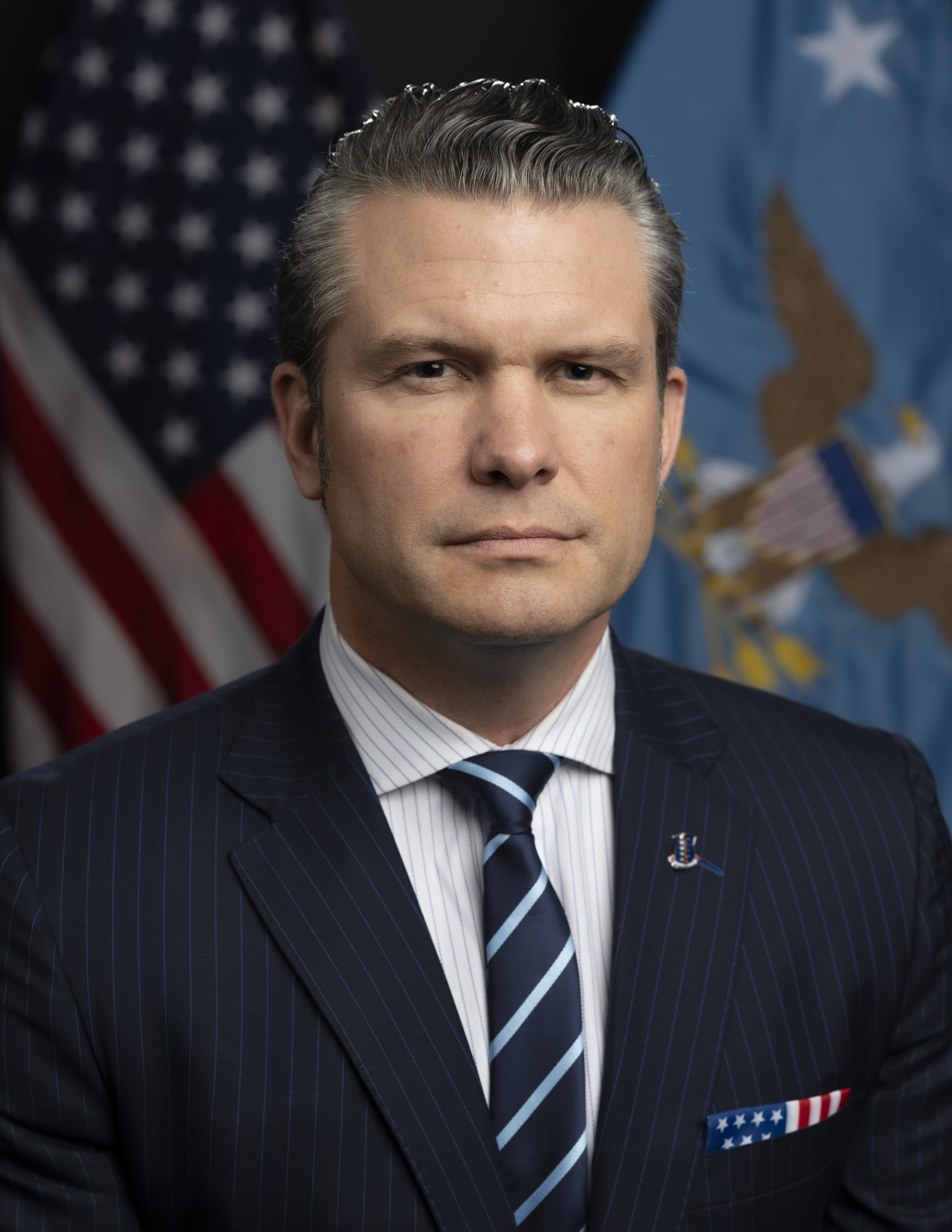
Pete Hegseth (A.B. 2003)

U.S. Presidents James Madison and Woodrow Wilson and vice presidents Aaron Burr, George M. Dallas, and John Breckinridge graduated from Princeton, as did Michelle Obama, the former First Lady of the United States. Former Chief Justice of the United States Oliver Ellsworth was an alumnus, as are current U.S. Supreme Court Associate Justices Samuel Alito, Elena Kagan, and Sonia Sotomayor. Alumnus Jerome Powell was appointed as chair of the U.S. Federal Reserve Board in 2018. Pete Hegseth, 29th U.S. secretary of defense, is a 2003 graduate of Princeton. Alumnus Mark Milley served as both 39th chief of staff of the United States Army and 20th chairman of the Joint Chiefs of Staff.

Princeton graduates played a major role in the American Revolution, including the first and last colonels to die on the Patriot side, Philip Johnston, and Nathaniel Scudder, as well as the highest ranking civilian leader on the British side David Mathews.

Notable graduates of Princeton's School of Engineering and Applied Science include Apollo astronaut and commander of Apollo 12 Pete Conrad, Amazon CEO and founder Jeff Bezos, former chairman of Alphabet Inc. Eric Schmidt, and Lisa P. Jackson, former administrator of the Environmental Protection Agency.

Actors Jimmy Stewart, Wentworth Miller, José Ferrer, David Duchovny, and Brooke Shields graduated from Princeton, as did composers Edward T. Cone and Milton Babbitt. Soccer-player alumna, Diana Matheson, scored the game-winning goal that earned Canada their Olympic bronze medal in 2012. Declan Farmer graduated in 2020 and has won multiple Paralympic Games gold medals and is the first U.S. sledge hockey player to score over 200 career goals.

Writers Booth Tarkington, F. Scott Fitzgerald, and Eugene O'Neill attended but did not graduate. Writer Selden Edwards and poet W. S. Merwin graduated from Princeton. American novelist Jodi Picoult and author David Remnick graduated. Pulitzer Prize-winning journalists Barton Gellman and Pam Belluck and Lorraine Adams, as well as Nobel Peace Prize laureate Maria Ressa, are Princeton alumni. William P. Ross, Principal Chief of the Cherokee Nation and founding editor of the Cherokee Advocate, graduated in 1844.

Notable graduate alumni include Allen Shenstone, Pedro Pablo Kuczynski, Thornton Wilder, Richard Feynman, Lee Iacocca, John Nash, Alonzo Church, Alan Turing, Terence Tao, Edward Witten, John Milnor, John Bardeen, Steven Weinberg, John Tate, and David Petraeus. Royals such as Prince Moulay Hicham of Morocco, Prince Turki bin Faisal Al Saud, and Queen Noor of Jordan attended Princeton.

=== Faculty ===
As of 2021, notable current faculty members included Angus Deaton, Robert Keohane, Edward W. Felten, Anthony Grafton, Peter Singer, Jim Peebles, Manjul Bhargava, Jesse Jenkins, Brian Kernighan, Betsy Levy Paluck and Robert P. George. Notable former faculty members include John Witherspoon, Walter Kaufmann, John von Neumann, Ben Bernanke, Paul Krugman, Joseph Henry, Toni Morrison, Joyce Carol Oates, Michael Mullen, Andrew Wiles, Jhumpa Lahiri, Cornel West, Daniel Kahneman, and alumnus Woodrow Wilson.

Albert Einstein, though on the faculty at the Institute for Advanced Study rather than at Princeton, came to be associated with the university through frequent lectures and visits on the campus.

== In popular culture ==
Princeton University is widely considered to be an institution that affiliates with and produces some of the most elite members of society. The university's reputation has made it a frequent reference in media.

- This Side of Paradise (1920): In F. Scott Fitzgerald's debut novel, the narrator, Amory Blaine details his life at Princeton, dabbling in literature and unfulfilled romances.
- A Beautiful Mind (2001): A biographical film centered on the award-winning mathematician, John Nash, featuring him studying for his PhD at Princeton in the first part of the film.
- A Cinderella Story (2004): The main love interest, Austin Ames dreams of becoming a writer and gets accepted into Princeton.
- The Rule of Four (2004): A thriller novel by Ian Caldwell and Dustin Thomason about four Princeton seniors: Tom, Paul, Charlie and Gil try to solve the mystery of a coded manuscript.

== See also ==
- Big Three (colleges)
- Higher education in New Jersey
- Princeton University Department of Physics
- The Princeton University Summer Journalism Program
- List of universities by number of billionaire alumni
