= C8H10N2O =

The molecular formula C_{8}H_{10}N_{2}O may refer to:

- Aminoacetanilides
  - 2-Aminoacetanilide
  - 3-Aminoacetanilide
  - 4-Aminoacetanilide
- Defenuron
