= Day Pitney =

American law firm

Day Pitney LLP
- No. of offices: 13
- No. of attorneys: 300
- Major practice areas: General practice
- Date founded: 2007 (merger)
- Company type: Limited liability partnership
- Website: www.daypitney.com

Day Pitney LLP is an American law firm with more than 300 attorneys spread across thirteen offices in six states and the District of Columbia.

== History ==
=== Predecessors ===
Pitney & Hardin was founded in Newark, New Jersey in 1902, by attorneys John R. Hardin and John Oliver Halstead Pitney, the latter being the brother of Supreme Court justice Mahlon Pitney. William J. Brennan Jr., who would later become a Supreme Court justice himself, was hired by the firm, right out of Harvard Law School, in 1931. According to Kim Isaac Eisler, in The Last Liberal: Justice William J. Brennan, Jr. and the Decisions That Transformed America, the firm's clients, particularly Phelps Dodge, Western Electric and General Electric, were "some of the most notoriously antilabor corporations in the state of New Jersey." Eisler asserted the anti-labor clients he worked for while at Pitney Hardin Ward & Brennan cemented the liberal outlook he would later bring to his Supreme Court opinions. In 1999, after several unsuccessful ventures into the New York market, Pitney Hardin LLP "finally established a beachhead in New York" by taking over the intellectual property firm of Kane, Dalsimer, Sullivan and Levy, absorbing eight attorneys and moving into the acquired firm's office space.

Day & Berry was founded in Hartford, Connecticut in 1919, by attorneys Edward M. Day, Joseph F. Berry, and Lawrence A. Howard. In 1922, the firm relocated its offices "to be close to one of its largest clients, Connecticut Bank and Trust" (CBT), and in 1923, the firm combined with a firm headed by Harry W. Reynolds to form Day, Berry & Reynolds. By the 1930s, the firm operated under the name, Day, Berry & Howard. The firm relocated to Constitution Plaza in 1963, again to stay close to CBT. By 1977, Day, Berry & Howard was one of the largest in Connecticut, and established an office in Stamford, Connecticut. By 1984, the firm had 120 attorneys and an equal number of staff, at which point it moved its headquarters to City Place I.

=== Merger and post-merger history ===
In October 2006, Pitney Hardin LLP and Day, Berry & Howard LLP announced that they were merging to form Day Pitney LLP. The law blog Above the Law, reviewing the announced merger in advance of its execution, questioned whether the move would be enough to give the new firm a foothold in the highly competitive New York legal market. The merger was carried out in January 2007.

In 2015 the firm was one of two sued for allegedly overbilling a client in a major Connecticut medical malpractice suit. In 2016 and 2019, the firm expanded in the Florida market by merging with smaller boutique firms, Chapin, Ballerano and Cheslack, and Richman Greer, respectively.

In 2020 the firm employed 268 attorneys in 13 offices.

== Practice areas ==
The firm has practices in litigation, probate, trusts and estates, labor & employment, corporate law, mergers and acquisitions, municipal finance, real estate, bankruptcy and creditors' rights, tax law, insurance law, intellectual property, and energy law. The firm's main client base consists of middle-market companies, but it also represents some of the larger companies of the Fortune 500 as well as individuals.

== Offices ==
The firm has offices in Boston, Connecticut (Greenwich, Hartford, New Haven, Stamford, and West Hartford), Florida (Miami, West Palm Beach, Boca Raton and Delray Beach), New York City, Parsippany, New Jersey, Providence, Rhode Island, and Washington, D.C.

== Notable lawyers and alumni ==
- William J. Brennan Jr.: United States Supreme Court Justice, worked at predecessor firm Pitney Hardin.
- Vanessa Lynne Bryant: Former associate at Day, Berry, & Howard, is a United States District Judge for the District of Connecticut.
- Sam Caligiuri: Former Connecticut State Senator (R-16th dist.), is a former partner in Day Pitney's Hartford office. Caligiuri also served on the Board of Aldermen of Waterbury, Connecticut, and ran for the United States Congress in 2010.
- John P. Cotter: Chief Justice of the Connecticut Supreme Court, who oversaw the consolidation of the state court system into its current structure.
- Christopher F. Droney: Retired judge of the United States Court of Appeals for the Second Circuit. He was mayor of West Hartford, Connecticut, from 1985 to 1989.
- Frederick R. Lehlbach: New Jersey politician who obtained his first legal experience in the office of Pitney & Hardin.
- Deval Patrick: Governor of Massachusetts, worked at predecessor firm Day, Berry, & Howard.
- Edgardo Ramos: Judge of the United States District Court for the Southern District of New York, former partner in Day Pitney's White Collar Defense and Internal Investigations practice.
- Chase T. Rogers: Former Chief Justice of the Connecticut Supreme Court.
- Michael P. Shea: Judge of the United States District Court for the District of Connecticut.
- Stefan R. Underhill: Chief Judge of the United States District Court for the District of Connecticut.
- Shawn T. Wooden: Connecticut State Treasurer.
