= Cane Spree =

Princeton college tradition

Cane Spree is an annual autumn tradition at The College of New Jersey (referred to then as Princeton College and now known as Princeton University) which began during the Gilded Age—the period just after the Civil War, or the mid-to-late 1860s. Cane Spree began as a riot between classes, turned into an annual event with each class designating a candidate for the wrestling, and ultimately shed its violence altogether to become a regular intramural multi-sport event held on the campus. The tradition endures today.

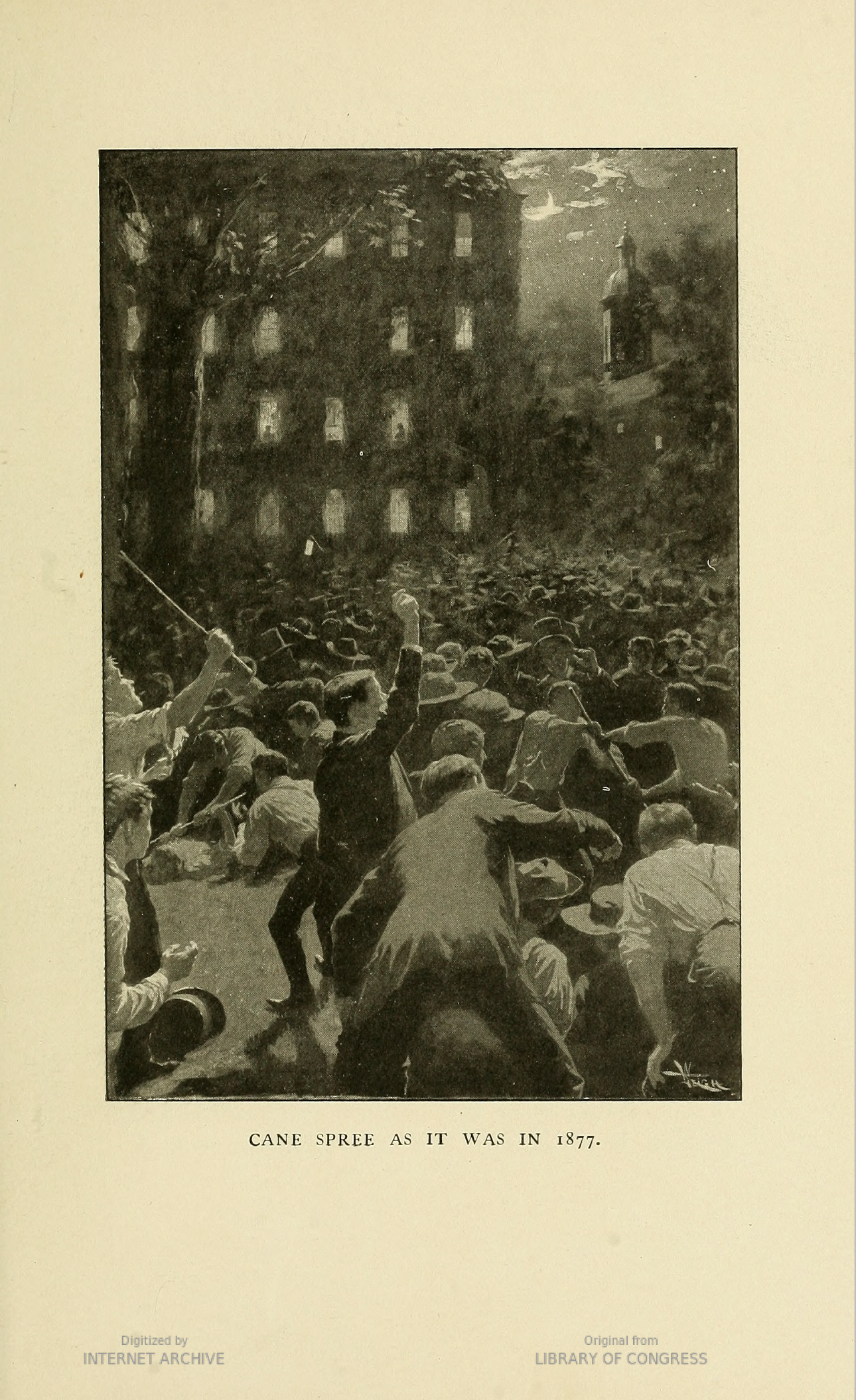
Cane Spree, 1877

== History ==
In the Gilded Age of the 1860s, fashionable and elegant gentlemen carried walking sticks (canes). At Princeton College, sophomores were offended by seeing underclassmen carrying canes and would attack freshmen students found carrying canes in a sort of hazing ritual.

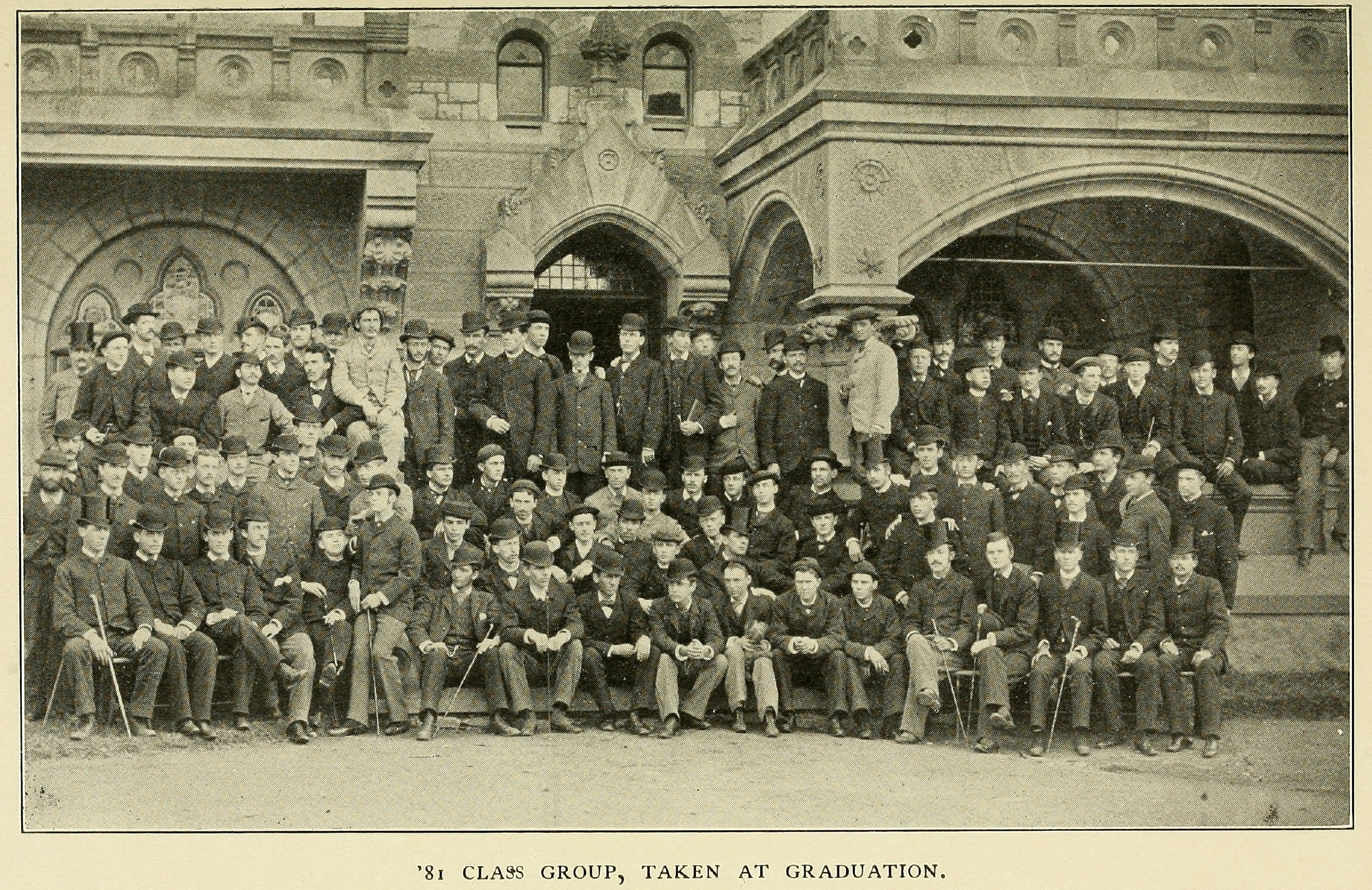
Princeton College Class of 1881

What eventually became known as Cane Spree began as an actual riot on Nassau Street in Princeton, New Jersey where sophomores "provoked by freshmen flaunting their canes" attacked the freshmen, relieving them of their canes in the process. Later, Cane Spree (in its modified, non-violent form) became a common form of hazing on campus, ultimately becoming what was considered the "first intramural sport" at the college. In 1868, sophomores officially proclaimed a ban on all freshmen, prohibiting them from carrying canes on campus. Any freshman found carrying a cane was subject to attack from sophomores, their canes taken in the process.

The sole rule of Cane Spree forbade biting. Cane Spree was described by Harrington DeGoyler Green as that [...Cane Spree would] "weld the class together and put some spirit in it." This was important because class identity and bonding is an important virtue at Princeton University. The 1868 Cane Spree inspired a song called "Siege of Canes".

Sometime in the 1870s the Princeton University administration attempted to implement controls to minimize the violence, however random attacks continued. On September 15, 1870, James McCosh (President of Princeton College) interrupted a brawl between sophomores and freshmen and shouted "Disperse, young men, or the bailiffs will be after you." By 1891, Cane Spree was formally abolished, but the class fighting continued informally. Between the 1880s and early 1900s as Cane Spree became an officially organized event; prominent newspapers would carry news of the winners, losers as well as details of what privileges the losers must relinquish. Throughout the years, it was said that winning a cane in Cane Spree was "the honor of a lifetime".

Cane Spree was reported in The New York Times, Scribner's Magazine, as well as local and university publications.

While it has changed significantly since its origins in the 1860s, Cane Spree is a tradition that endures today, taking place in Princeton's football stadium in early October as a friendly and fun multi-sport battle for supremacy between the freshmen and sophomore classes.

== Canes ==
The canes (walking sticks) carried by students were intricately carved and decorated by the class members themselves who etched their autograph or decorative mark onto the cane. Many of the markings detail the intended profession or area of study of the engraver. Canes were passed around for each carved name to be added then returned to their owner.

Hand-carved walking stick from Princeton College class of 1881 student
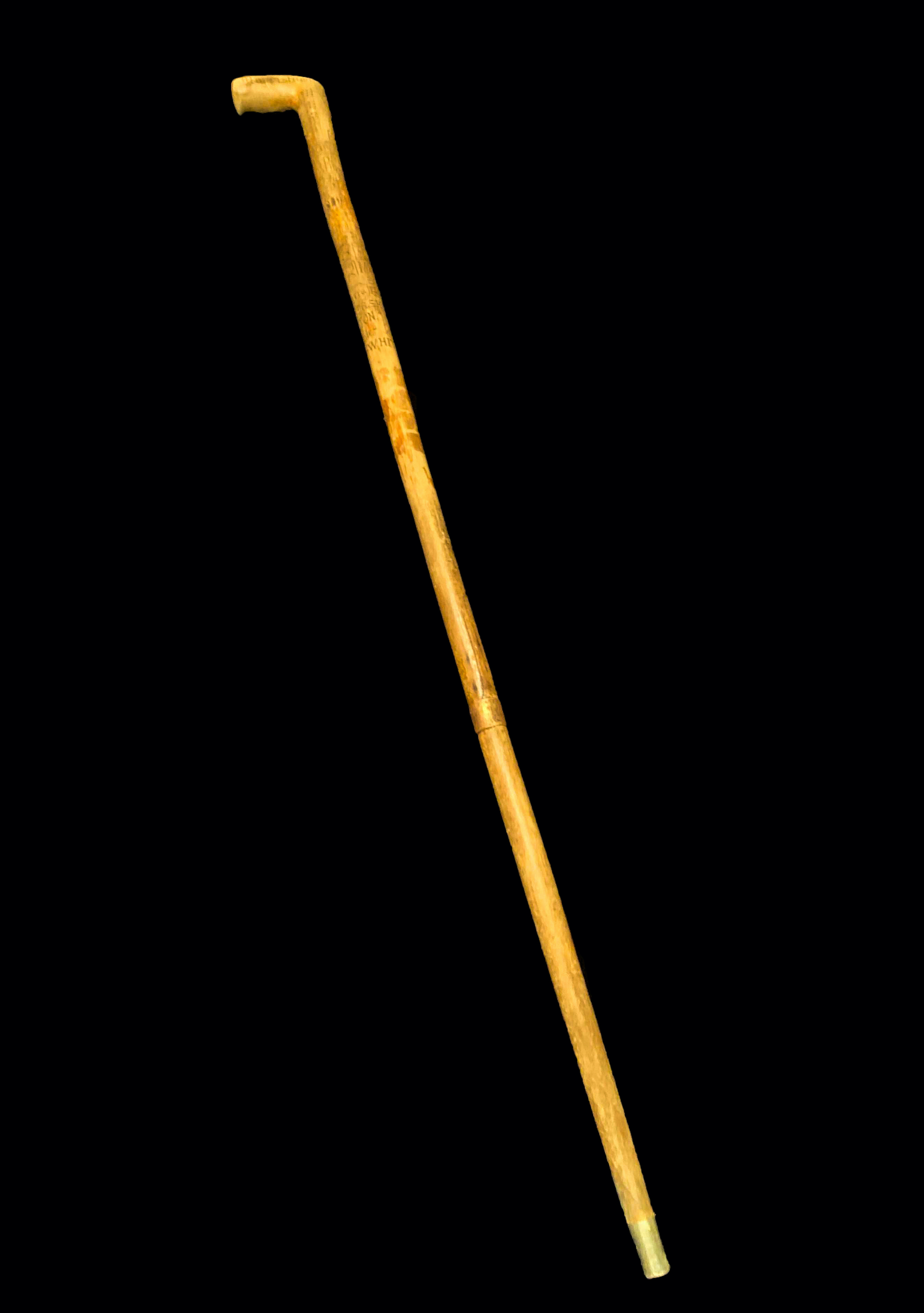
Full-length view of top portiion

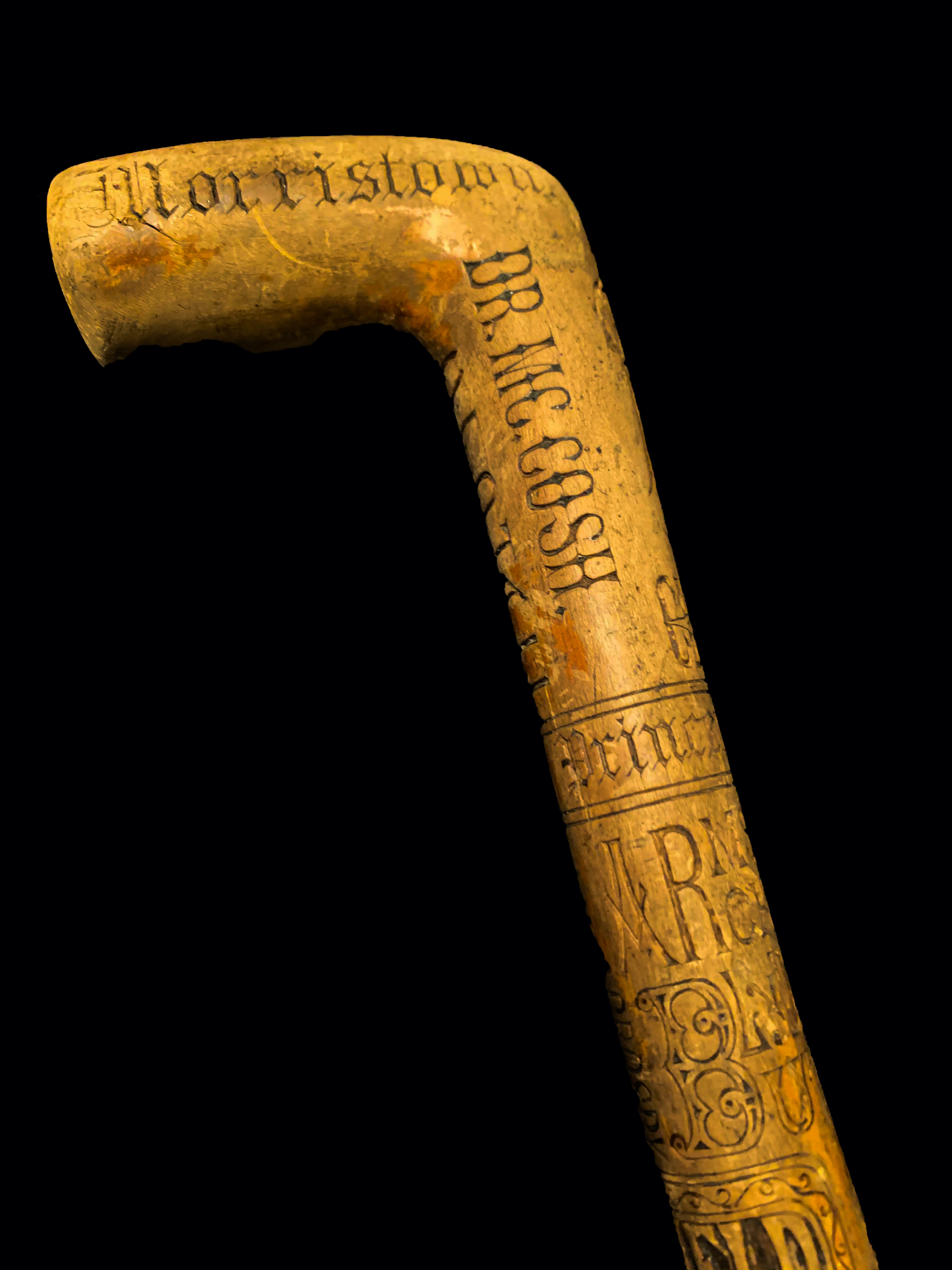
Side view, 3/4 length

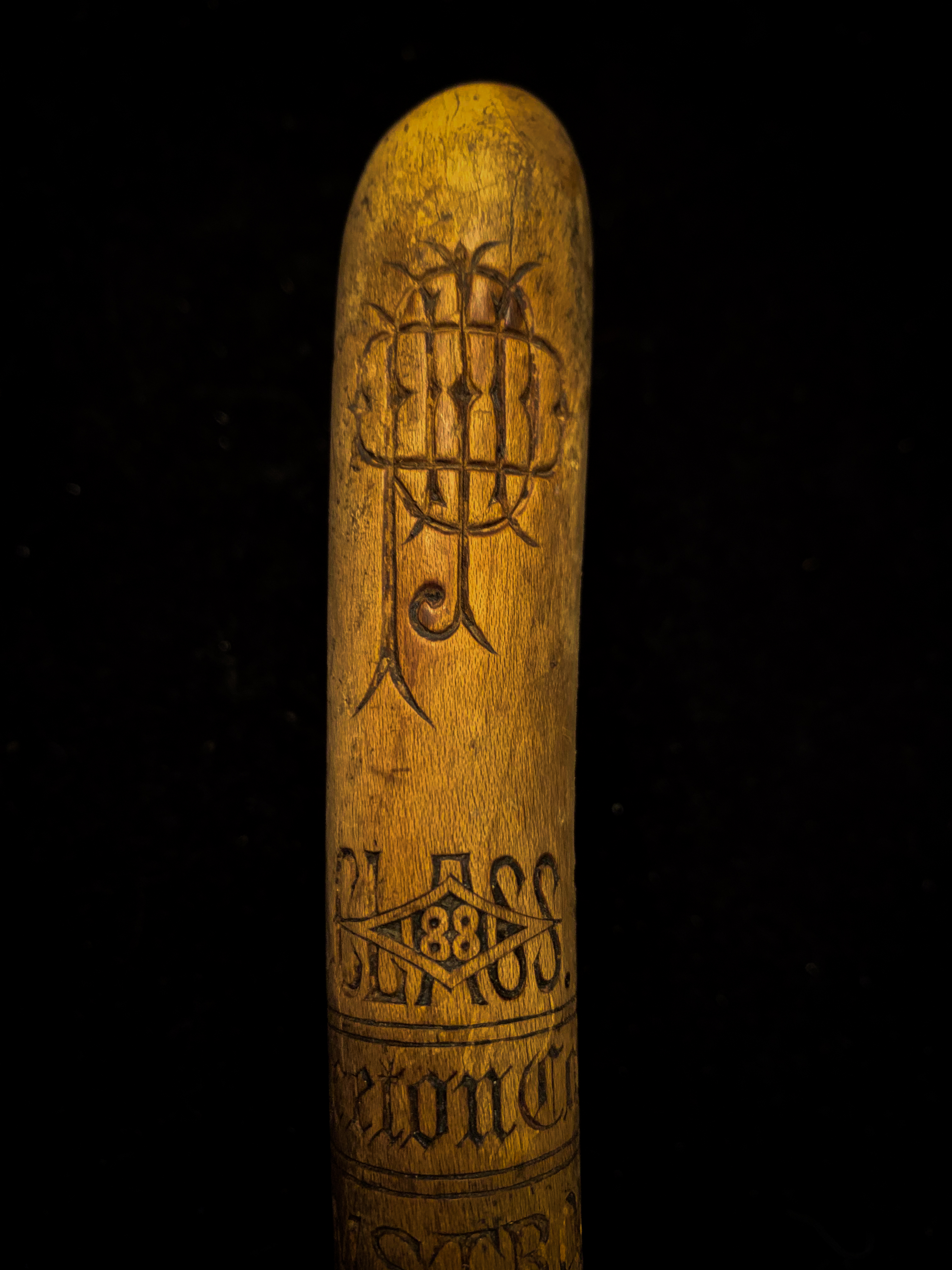
Top front view

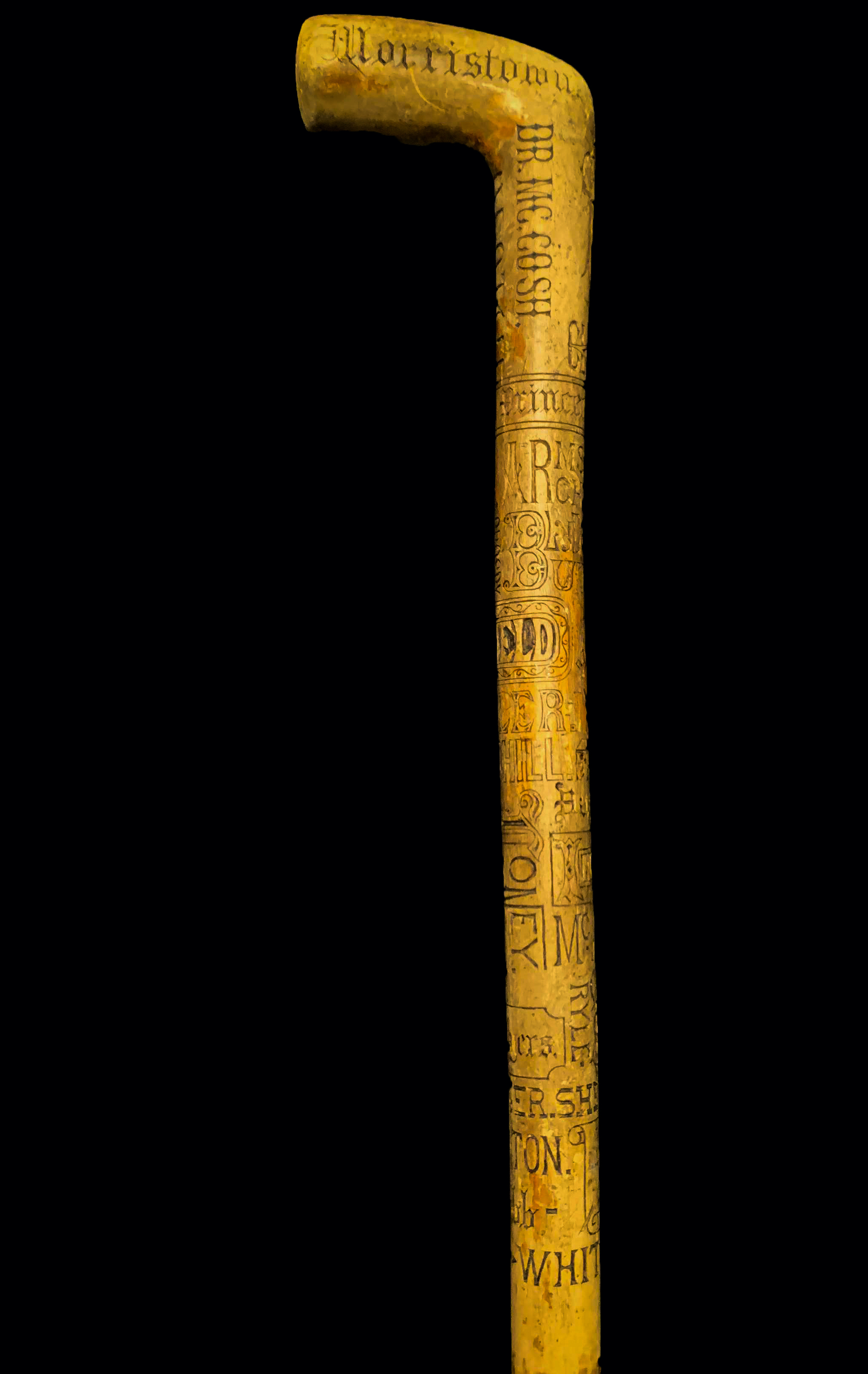
Side view

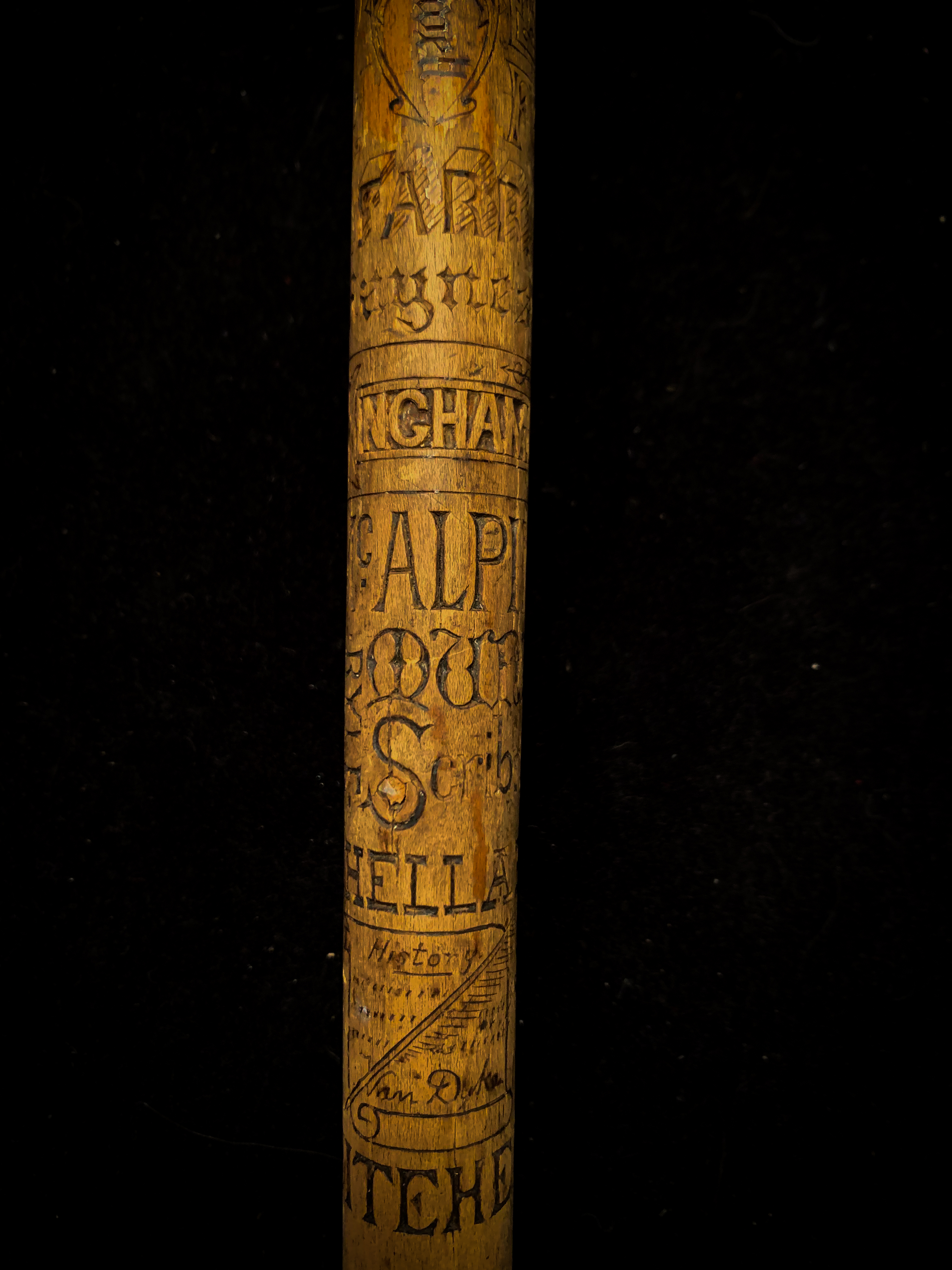
Close up view of engraved names

=== Notable names ===
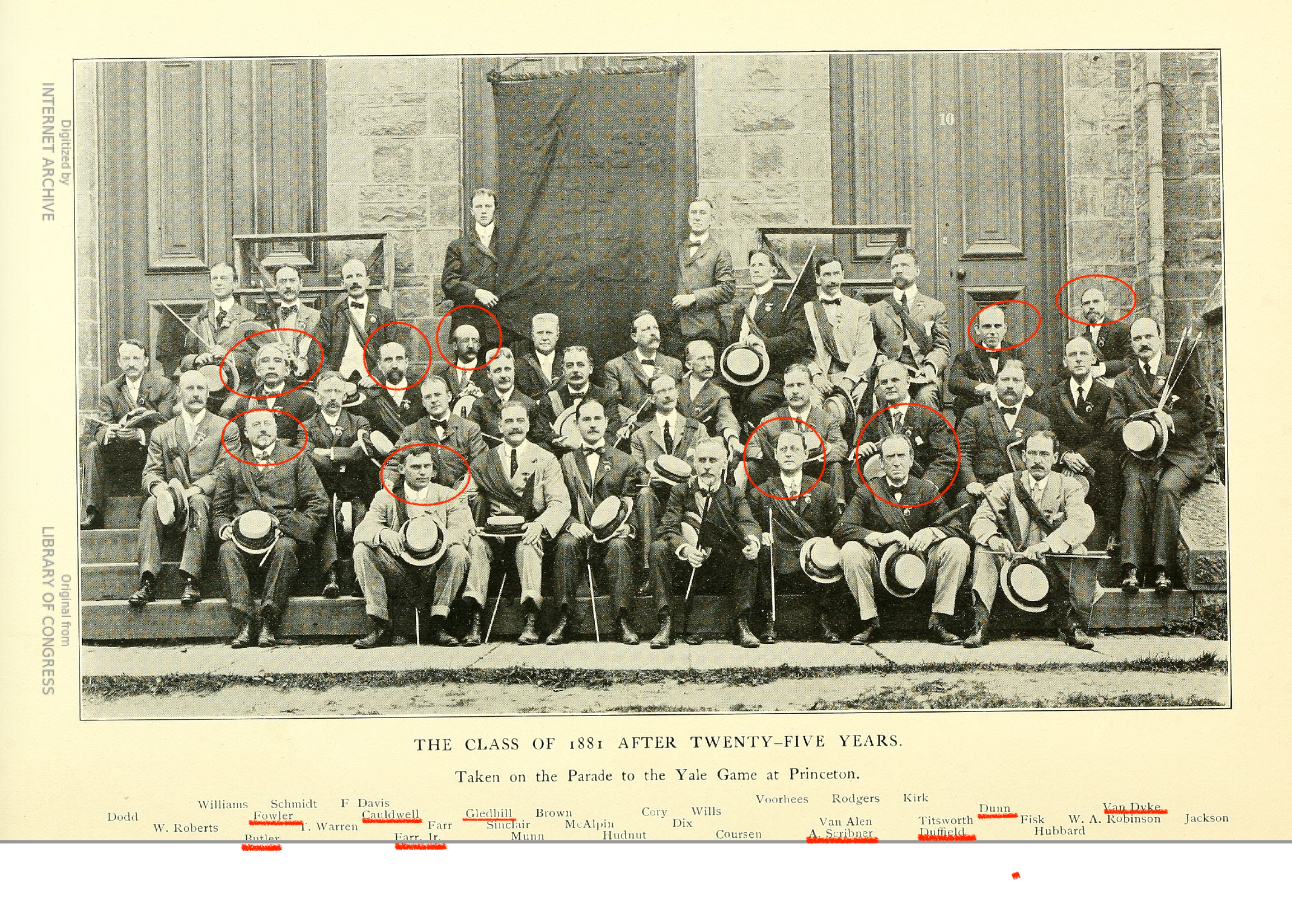
Princeton college class of 1881, 25 years later.

Several of the names carved on the Princeton College class of 1881 cane pictured above are members of prominent Gilded Age families and/or went on to become notable historical figures:

- Dr. Atwater
- A. C. Armstrong
- James R. Archer
- Adam Todd Bruce
- Charles Henry Butler
- Benjamin B. Blydenburgh
- Thomas W. Cauldwell
- Edward Floyd Crosby
- Henry G. Duffield
- Charles E. Dunn
- T. H. Powers Farr
- Jack Fowler
- Frank Gledhill
- David Adams Haynes
- William (Billy) Ingham
- Francis G. Landon
- Francis Loney
- Henry McAlpin
- James McCosh
- Samuel H. Myers
- Henry M. Payne
- John Oliver Halsted Pitney
- Charlie Ryle (Charles Danforth)
- Arthur A. Scribner
- Robert Rogers Shellabarger
- Lewis H. Stanton
- Paul VanDyke
- James Augustus Webb, Jr.
- A. Pennington (Penn) Whitehead
