= 4-Aminoacetanilide =

Chemical compound

Names
- Preferred IUPAC name N-(4-Aminophenyl)acetamide
- Other names p-Aminoacetanilide, N-(4-Aminophenyl)acetamide

Identifiers
CAS Number	122-80-5
3D model (JSmol)	Interactive image
ChEBI	CHEBI:229632
ChEMBL	ChEMBL1318876
ChemSpider	10297844
ECHA InfoCard	100.004.161
EC Number	204-576-6
PubChem CID	31230
UNII	IH5OX0I3Z9
CompTox Dashboard (EPA)	DTXSID7024455
- InChI: InChI=1S/C8H10N2O/c1-6(11)10-8-4-2-7(9)3-5-8/h2-5H,9H2,1H3,(H,10,11) Key: CHMBIJAOCISYEW-UHFFFAOYSA-N
- SMILES: NC1=CC=C(NC(C)=O)C=C1

Properties
Chemical formula	C_{8}H_{10}N_{2}O
Molar mass	150.181 g·mol^{−1}
Appearance	leaf or flake like white-Pink To Brown Powder
Density	1.1392
Melting point	164–167 °C (327–333 °F; 437–440 K)
Boiling point	267 °C (513 °F; 540 K)
Solubility in water	0.1-1 g/100 mL at 25 °C

Hazards
- GHS labelling
Pictograms	(GHS07: Exclamation mark) (GHS08: Health hazard)
Signal word	Danger
Hazard statements	H317, H319, H334
Precautionary statements	P261, P264, P272, P280, P285, P302+P352, P304+P341, P305+P351+P338, P321, P333+P313, P337+P313, P342+P311, P363, P501
- Except where otherwise noted, data are given for materials in their standard state (at 25 °C [77 °F], 100 kPa). Infobox references

4-Aminoacetanilide or paracetamin is a chemical compound which is an amino derivative of acetanilide and para-isomer of aminoacetanilide. There are two other isomers of aminoacetanilide, 2-aminoacetanilide and 3-aminoacetanilide. Aminoacetanilide derivatives are important synthetic intermediates in heterocyclic and aromatic synthesis. These derivatives have found applications in pharmaceutical industry and dyes and pigment industry.

== Synthesis ==
Becillus cereus converts 4-phenylenediamine to 4-aminoacetanilide. Reduction of 4-nitroacetanilide by hydrogenation catalyst generates 4-aminoacetanilide. Green synthesis of p-Aminoacetanilide is achieved by reducing p-nitroaetanilide using Zn/NH_{4}Cl in water. Number of methods are available to reduce 4-nitroacetanilide using different catalyst and reaction conditions.

== Uses ==
4-Aminoacetanilide is used as in intermediate in the production of some dyes. 4-aminoacetanilide is also used for the synthesis of beta-lactams.
