= United States v. Antikamnia Chemical Co. =

- Supreme Court of the United States

Decided January 5, 1914
- Full case name: United States v. Antikamnia Chemical Co.
- Citations: 231 U.S. 654 (more)

Holding
- Administrative agencies can enforce regulations related to the act that they are charged with implementing.

Court membership
- Chief Justice Edward D. White Associate Justices Joseph McKenna · Oliver W. Holmes Jr. William R. Day · Horace H. Lurton; Charles E. Hughes · Willis Van Devanter; Joseph R. Lamar · Mahlon Pitney

Case opinion
- Majority: McKenna, joined by unanimous

Laws applied
- Pure Food and Drug Act

United States v. Antikamnia Chemical Co., 231 U.S. 654 (1914), was a United States Supreme Court case in which the court held that administrative agencies can enforce regulations related to the act that they are charged with implementing. To be valid, such regulations need to be administrative in nature and cannot expand the terms of the law. The lawsuit involved a purported medicine called antikamnia.
