= Beatrice Pitney Lamb =

American writer

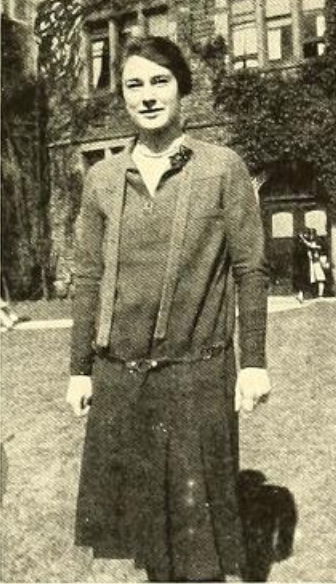
- Beatrice Pitney (later Lamb), from the 1927 yearbook of Bryn Mawr College
- Born: Beatrice Louise Pitney; May 12, 1904; Morristown, New Jersey
- Died: December 9, 1997 (aged 93); Hightstown, New Jersey
- Occupations: Editor; writer; photographer
- Relatives: Mahlon Pitney (father); John Oliver Halstead Pitney (uncle); Christopher Reeve (grandson); Matthew Reeve (great-grandson); F. D. Reeve (son-in-law)

Beatrice Louise Pitney Lamb (May 12, 1904 – December 9, 1997) was an American editor and writer. She worked with the League of Women Voters in the 1930s, and with the United Nations in the 1940s. She published several books on India.

== Early life and education ==
Beatrice Pitney was born in Morristown, New Jersey, the daughter of Mahlon Pitney and Florence Theodora Shelton Pitney. Her father was an Associate Justice on the United States Supreme Court. Her uncle was lawyer John Oliver Halstead Pitney. She graduated from Westover School and, in 1927, from Bryn Mawr College. She completed further studies in international relations at the Geneva Graduate Institute. Much later, in 1956, she earned a master's degree from Columbia University.

== Career ==
Lamb wrote pamphlets on policy topics for the National League of Women Voters in the early 1930s, and chaired the League's department of government and economic welfare. She also represented the League in a hearing before the Senate Finance Committee in 1935, in support of unemployment compensation. From 1945 to 1950, she was the editor of the United Nations News, and lectured on the United Nations to community groups. "We are never going to save the world from communism without effort and without sacrifice," she told a Pennsylvania audience in 1950, in reference to the Korean War and NATO. "We have been thinking it could be done cheaply and easily."

Lamb was a delegate to a conference on Indo-American relations in New Delhi, and spent much of her later life traveling, photographing, and writing about India. She published several books on the subject, and exhibited her photographs in galleries and museums. She also revised the India article for the World Book Encyclopedia. "Her intelligence was obvious, her energy formidable, her exuberant enthusiasms contagious," wrote Orville Prescott in a 1963 review for The New York Times.

== Publications ==
- Reparations and War Debts in 1932 (1932, pamphlet)
- Economic causes of war and the hope for the future (1932, pamphlet)
- Buyers Beware: The Case for New Food, Drug, and Cosmetics Legislation (1935)
- Government and the Consumer (1935)
- "Documents of the United Nations" (1947)
- Trade and Aid (1953)
- Introduction to India (1960)
- India: A World in Transition (1964)
- India (1965)
- The Nehrus of India: Three Generations of Leadership (1967)
- "Glimpses of a Great Person" (1988)

== Personal life ==
Beatrice Pitney married lawyer Horace R. Lamb. They had two daughters, Barbara and Dorothy. One of their grandchildren was actor Christopher Reeve. Her husband died in 1977, and she died in 1997, at the age of 93, at a retirement community in Hightstown, New Jersey.
