= Alfred E. Neuman =

Mascot for Mad magazine

Neuman on Mad 30, published December 1956

Alfred E. Neuman is the fictitious mascot and cover boy of the American humor magazine Mad. The character's distinctive missing-tooth, smiling face, freckles, red hair, protruding ears, and scrawny body date back to late 19th-century advertisements for painless dentistry, as does the origin of his "What, me worry?" motto. The magazine's founder and original editor, Harvey Kurtzman, began using the character in 1954. He was named "Alfred E. Neuman" (a name Kurtzman had previously used in an unconnected way) by Mad's second editor Al Feldstein in 1956. Neuman's likeness has appeared on all but a handful of the magazine's covers, over 550 issues. He has almost always been rendered in a front view but has occasionally been seen in silhouette, or directly from behind. The cover from September 1973, the magazine's best-selling number ever, depicts him floating upside down, his feet seen jutting out from an SS Poseidon life preserver.

== Appearance ==
Neuman's most prominent physical feature is his missing-tooth grin, with a few notable exceptions. On the cover of issue #236 (January 1983), Neuman was featured with E.T. the Extra-Terrestrial. The cover showed E.T. using his famous "healing finger" to touch Neuman's mouth and regenerate the missing tooth. A text gag on the cover of issue #263 (June 1986) claimed that the UPC was really a "Close-up Photograph of Neuman's Missing Tooth". The cover of issue #411 (November 2001), the first to be produced following the 9/11 attacks in the United States, showed a close-up of Neuman's face, but his gap was now filled with an American flag.

Despite the primacy of Neuman's incomplete smile, his other facial features have occasionally attracted notice. The artist Andy Warhol said that seeing Neuman taught him to love people with big ears.

In 1958, Mad published letters from several readers noting the resemblance between Neuman and England's Prince Charles, then nine years old. Shortly thereafter, an angry letter under a Buckingham Palace letterhead arrived at the Mad offices: "Dear Sirs No it isn't a bit – not the least little bit like me. So jolly well stow it! See! Charles. P." The letter was authenticated as having been written on triple-cream laid royal stationery bearing an official copper-engraved crest. The postmark indicated it had been mailed from a post office within a short walking distance of Buckingham Palace. Unfortunately, the original letter disappeared in the '80s while on loan to another magazine and has never been located.

For many years, Mad sold full-color prints of the official portrait of Neuman through a small house ad on the letters page of the magazine. In the early years, the price for one picture was 25 cents, three for 50 cents, nine for a dollar, or 27 for two dollars. The ad frequently stated that the prints were "suitable for framing or wrapping fish".

== History ==
=== Origins ===
==== Image ====
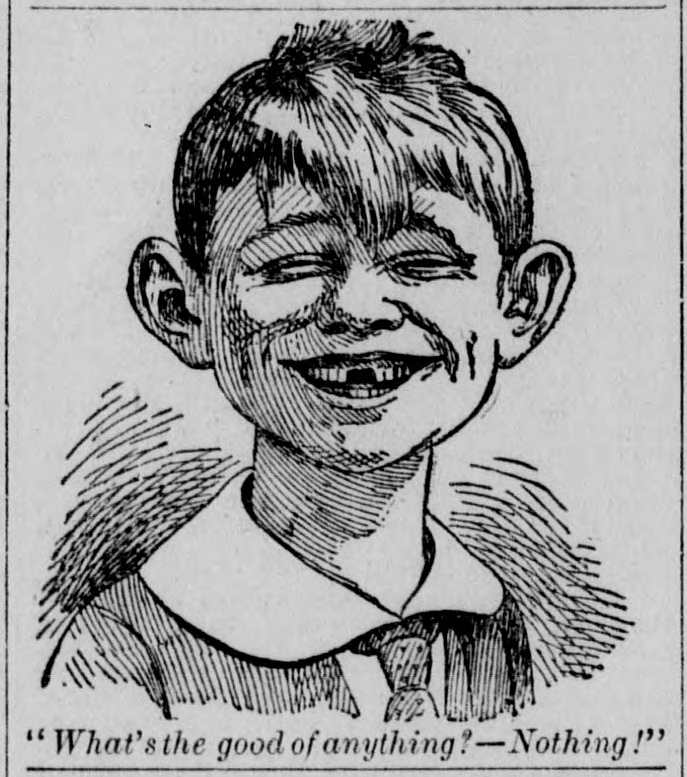
The New Boy (1894)

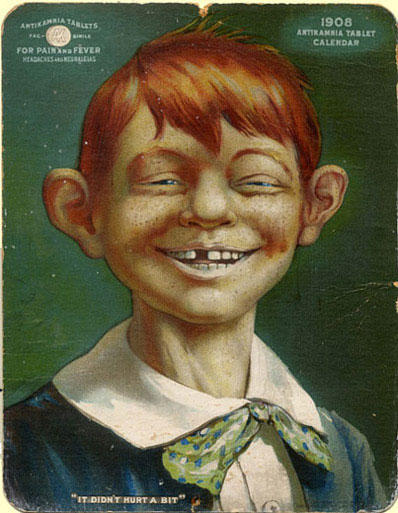
Antikamnia tablet calendar (1908)

The precise origin of the image used for Alfred E. Neuman is unknown. Among the earliest known images is an advertisement for Atmore's Mince Meat, Genuine English Plum Pudding. Author Maria Reidelbach wrote, "Dating from 1895, this is the oldest verified image of the boy. ... The kid's features are fully developed and unmistakable, and the image was very likely taken from an older archetype ..."

An older "archetype" was discovered in an advertisement for the comical stage play The New Boy, which debuted on Broadway in 1894. The image is nearly identical to that which appears in the Atmore's ads. A description of the stage play's advertisement was published in the Hartford Courant, 31 October 1894, using words that could easily be describing the character of Alfred E. Neuman. The paper reported that the "comic, red-headed urchin with a joyous grin all over his freckled face, whose phiz [face] is the trademark of the comedy, is so expressive of the rollicking and ridiculous that the New York Herald and the Evening Telegram have applied it to political cartoon purposes." Elements of the plot of the play explain why the character has adult and childlike features, why the character is dressed as he is, and how he may have lost his tooth. The original New Boy image was published with a two-part phrase that is similar in tone to Neuman's, "What? Me worry?" catch phrase: "What's the good of anything? – Nothing!"

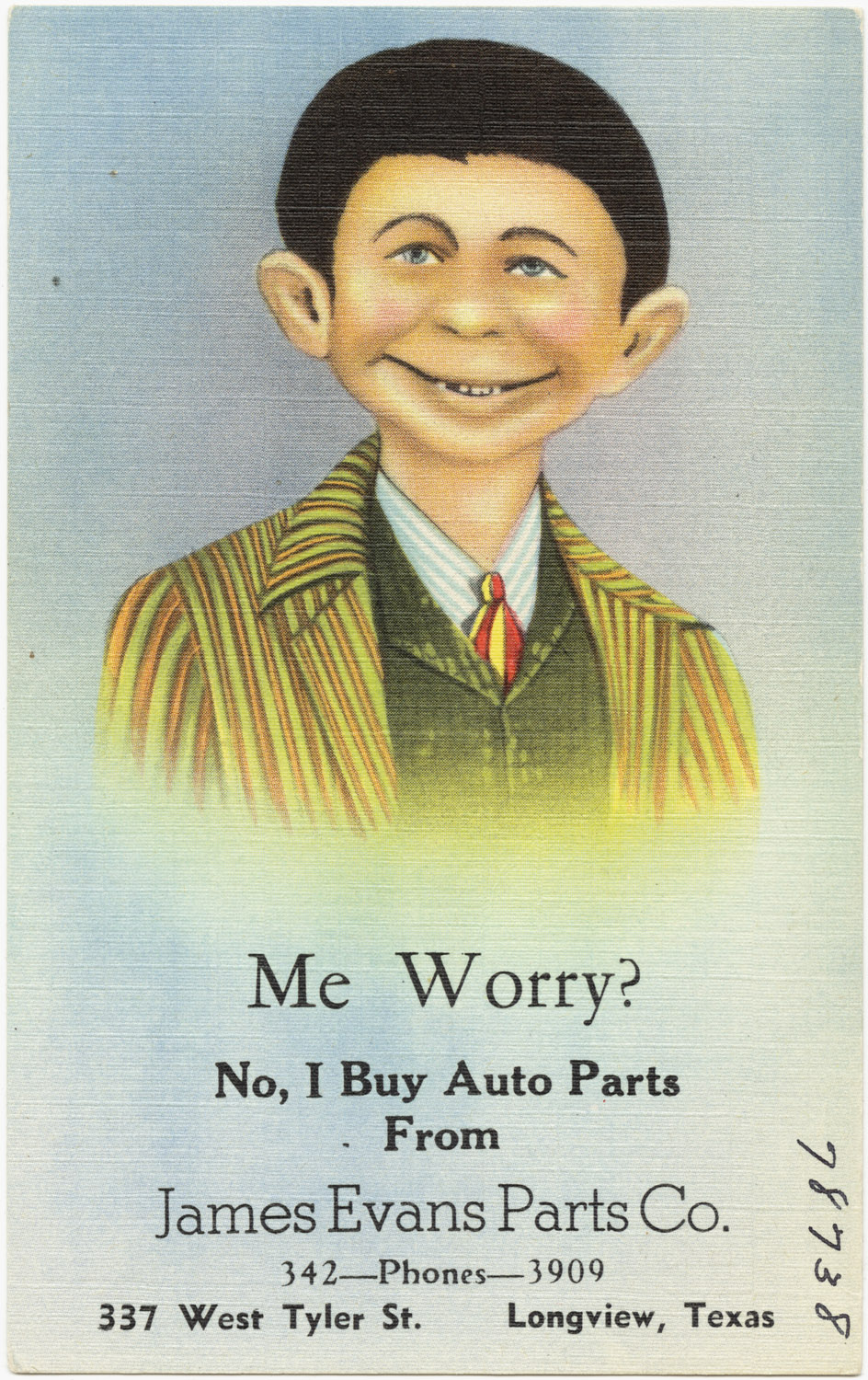
Postcard with a similar boy and slogan to Mad's Neuman (Longview, Texas, c. 1930–1945)

Similar faces turned up in advertising for "painless" dentistry. According to original Mad publisher William Gaines, the caricature Neuman had his origin in Topeka with the Painless Romine Topeka Dental College – which actually was a dental practice at 704 Kansas Avenue, at the office of a dentist who resided and practiced in Wichita, William Romine (often misspelled as Romaine). A face virtually identical to Neuman's appears in the 1923 issue of the University of Minnesota's humor magazine The Guffer above the caption "Medic after passing con exam in p. chem." Another near-identical face shows on the logo for Happy Jack Beverages, a soda drink produced by the A.B. Cook company in 1939. Another image appeared as aircraft "nose art" on an American World War II bomber, over the motto "Me Worry?"

Neuman's image was also used derisively in political ads to depict supporters of a rival candidate, implying that only an idiot would vote for the advertiser's opponent. In 1940, those opposing Franklin Delano Roosevelt's third-term reelection bid distributed postcards with a similar caricature bearing the caption, "Sure, I'm for Roosevelt". In some instances the "idiot" implication may have been used as a Jewish caricature, as Carl Djerassi's autobiography claims that in Vienna after the Anschluss, he saw posters with a similar face and the caption Tod den Juden ["Death to Jews"].

Eastern Michigan University held an exhibit and symposium in 2008, on the evolution of Neuman images dating back to 1877.

==== Name choice ====
The EC editors grew up listening to the radio, and this was frequently reflected in their stories, names, and references. The Governor of New York at the time was Alfred E. Smith, but the name "Alfred E. Neuman" derived from comedian Henry Morgan's Here's Morgan radio series on Mutual, ABC, and NBC. One character on his show had a name that was a reference to composer Alfred Newman, who scored many films and also composed the familiar fanfare that accompanies 20th Century Fox's opening film logo. In turn, Henry Morgan's possible inspiration was the character "Sir Henry Morgan", played by Laird Cregar in The Black Swan (1942). Newman wrote the Oscar-nominated score for that film. The Mad staff enjoyed Morgan's sarcastic, brash broadcasts and took note; they reworked the name into Neuman, as Kurtzman explained in a 1975 press release:

The name Alfred E. Neuman was picked up from [composer] Alfred Newman, the music arranger from back in the 1940s and 1950s. Actually, we borrowed the name indirectly through The Henry Morgan Show. He used the name Newman for an innocuous character you'd forget in five minutes. So we started using the name Alfred Neuman. The readers insisted on putting the name and the face together, and they would call the "What, Me Worry?" face Alfred Neuman.

In 2012, longtime editor Nick Meglin offered an exasperated, shorter version of the name choice:

Oh, don't ask me about Alfred E. Neuman. That story is so old and so meaningless. Does the average Playboy reader care about where the rabbit came from? It's just a symbol that lets you know what's on the inside. It's just a name we made up. We had 20, and that's the one we settled on.

==== Motto ====
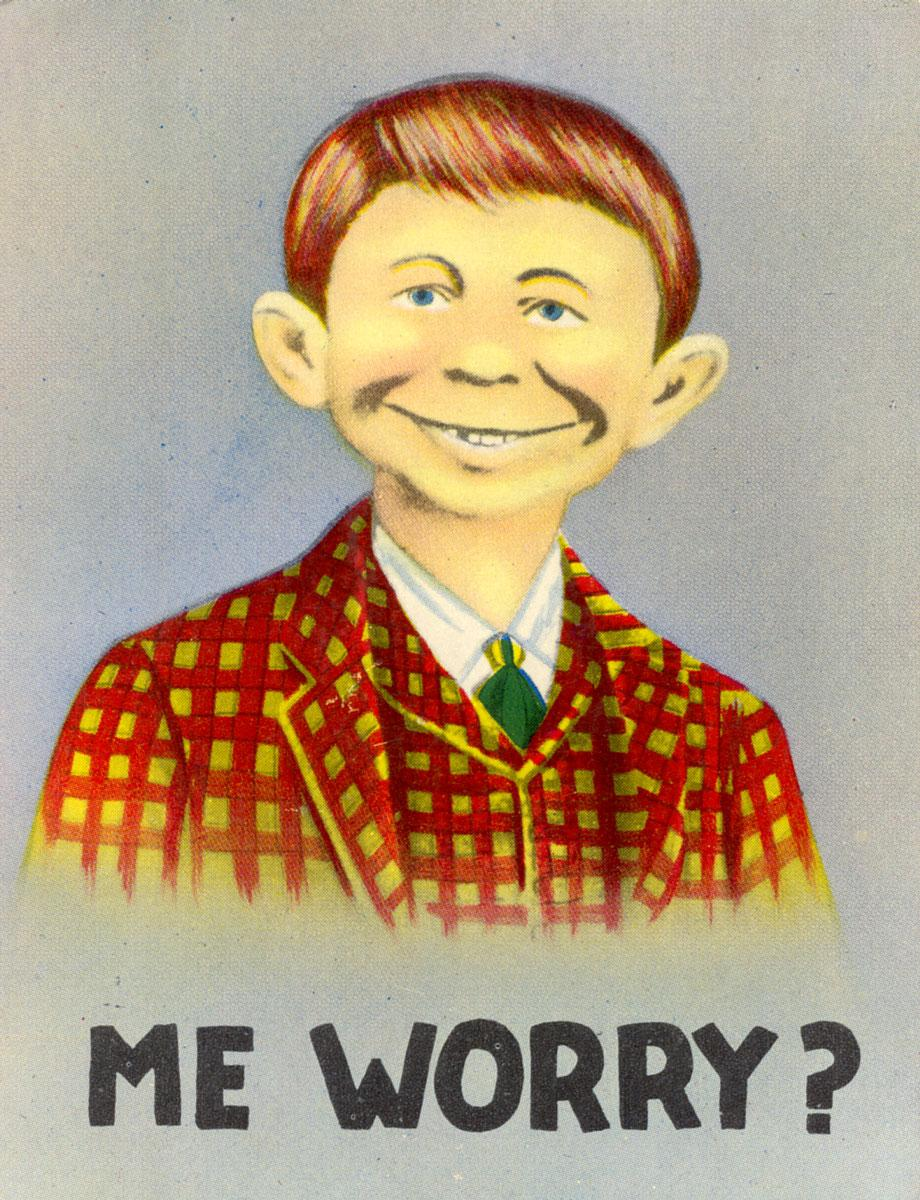
Early image of the "Me Worry?" kid, from the early 1950s

Neuman's famous motto is the intellectually incurious "What, me worry?" This was changed for one issue to "Yes, me worry!" after the Three Mile Island accident in 1979. On the cover of current printings of the paperback The Ides of Mad, as rendered by long-time cover artist Norman Mingo, Neuman is portrayed as a Roman bust with his catchphrase engraved on the base, translated into Dog Latin – Quid, Me Anxius Sum?

=== Mad magazine ===
Harvey Kurtzman first spotted the image on a postcard pinned to the office bulletin board of Ballantine Books editor Bernard Shir-Cliff. "It was a face that didn't have a care in the world, except mischief", recalled Kurtzman. Shir-Cliff was later a contributor to various magazines created by Kurtzman.

First cover appearance of Neuman, on Mad#21 (third from viewer's left of the six faces approx. 40% down the viewer's-right side)

In November 1954, the image made its Mad debut on the front cover of Ballantine's The Mad Reader, a paperback collection of reprints from the first two years of Mad. The character's first appearance in the comic book was on the cover of Mad #21 (March 1955), in a tiny image as part of a mock advertisement. A rubber mask bearing his likeness with "idiot" written underneath was offered for $1.29 (equivalent to $16 in 2025).

Mad switched to a magazine format starting with issue #24, July, 1955, and Neuman's face appeared in the top, central position of the illustrated border used on the covers, with his now-familiar signature phrase "What, me worry?" rendered as "What? Me worry?" Also on the border, in the lower left corner, is a middle-age man with glasses, identified as Alfred L. Neuman. These borders were used for five more issues, through Mad #30 (December 1956).

The character was also shown on page 7 of Mad #24 as "Melvin Coznowski", on page 32 with the caption "Face of boy who was heard to remark 'What? Me worry?'", on page 62 in a fake ad for a pain reliever called Anasprin, and on page 63, where he is identified as Alfred E. Neuman, but so is a picture of Josef Stalin, a Martian, and a blank picture. In later issues he appeared as "Melvin Cowsnofsky" or "Mel Haney". In Mad #25, the face and name are shown together on separate pages, as are Neuman and Mel Haney. The crowded cover shot on Mad #27 marked Neuman's first color appearance.

Mad #24 had two appearances by a different Alfred E. Neuman, portrayed as a little man in a traditional morning suit, with a mustache, slicked-over hair, and spectacles.

Al Feldstein took over as Mad's editor in 1956, and he seized upon the face:

I decided that I wanted to have this visual logo as the image of Mad, the same way that corporations had the Jolly Green Giant and the dog barking at the gramophone for RCA. This kid was the perfect example of what I wanted. So I put an ad in The New York Times that said, "National magazine wants portrait artist for special project". In walked this little old guy in his sixties named Norman Mingo, and he said, "What national magazine is this?" I said "Mad," and he said, "Goodbye." I told him to wait, and I dragged out all these examples and postcards of this idiot kid, and I said, "I want a definitive portrait of this kid. I don't want him to look like an idiot – I want him to be loveable and have an intelligence behind his eyes. But I want him to have this devil-may-care attitude, someone who can maintain a sense of humor while the world is collapsing around him." I adapted and used that portrait, and that was the beginning.

Mingo's defining portrait was used on the cover of Mad #30 in late 1956 as a supposed write-in candidate for the presidency, and it fixed his identity and appearance into the version that has been used ever since. In November 2008, Mingo's original cover art sold at auction for $203,150. Mingo painted seven more Neuman covers through 1957 and became the magazine's signature cover artist throughout the 1960s and 1970s. He produced 97 Mad covers in total and illustrated dozens of additional cover images for Mad's many reprint Specials and its line of paperbacks. From 1958 to 1962, Mingo focused on his advertising work. During Mingo's absence, Frank Kelly Freas rendered Neuman for Mad. Mingo's total surpassed Freas' in 1965, and his leading status endured until 2016, when current contributor Mark Fredrickson became the most prolific Mad cover artist with his 98th cover.

Neuman has appeared in one form or another on the cover of nearly every issue of Mad and its spinoffs since that issue and continuing to the present day, with a small handful of exceptions. Two such departures were Mad #233 (September 1982) which replaced Neuman's image with that of Pac-Man, and Mad #195 (December 1977) which instead featured the message "Pssst! Keep This Issue Out of the Hands of Your Parents! (Make 'Em Buy Their Own Copy!)". Even when Neuman is not part of the cover gag, or when the cover is entirely text-based, his disembodied head generally appears in miniature form. The most notorious Neuman-free cover was #166 (April 1974), which featured a human hand giving the profane "middle finger" gesture while declaring Mad to be "The Number One Ecch Magazine". Some newsstands that normally carried Mad chose not to display or sell this issue.

Neuman's ubiquity as a grinning cover boy grew as the magazine's circulation quadrupled, but the single highest-selling issue of Mad depicted only his feet. The cover image of issue #161, spoofing the 1972 film The Poseidon Adventure, showed Neuman floating upside-down inside a life preserver. The original art for this cover was purchased at auction in 1992 for $2,200 by Annie Gaines, the widow of Mad founder and publisher William Gaines, and subsequently given on permanent loan to Mad writer Dick DeBartolo. The image was copied in 1998 for issue #369 by famed illustrator Mick McGinty, spoofing the hit film Titanic.

== Legacy ==
=== In other media ===
In late 1959, Mad released a 45 rpm single entitled "What – me worry?", by Alfred E. Neuman and his Furshlugginer Five, featuring an uncredited voice actor singing Neuman's part. (The B-side of the single, "Potrzebie", is an instrumental.)

In the 1957 French documentary Letter from Siberia, the filmmakers hung a print of Alfred in the background of a parody advertisement for Horn Flakes, a breakfast cereal presumably made from or including reindeer antlers.

Alfred makes a cameo in an episode of Mister Magoo appearing at end of "Mr. Magoo and the Beanstalk" as the son of the giant from the fairy tale "Jack and the Beanstalk".

A live-action version of Neuman – an uncredited actor wearing a mask – appears briefly in the 1980 film Up the Academy. The film's original run in theaters was titled Mad Magazine presents: Up the Academy, but Mad Magazine revoked its support, so footage of the Neuman character was excised from later North American home video and television releases; the segment was restored on the 2006 DVD release.

Neuman appeared occasionally in the early seasons of MADtv during sketches and interstitials, and briefly appeared in the animated TV series Mad.

=== Lawsuit ===
In 1965, a lawsuit concerning the origins and copyright of the Neuman image made it all the way to the Supreme Court of the United States. A small publisher sued the parent company of Mad magazine, claiming infringement of a 1914 copyright of the Neuman character's image. Mad asked readers to find earlier images of the character in an attempt to show it was part of the public domain. The Court ruled in favor of Mad, and found the 1914 copyright holder could not prove that all prints manufactured by her husband, the original holder, carried a valid copyright notice. Furthermore, the court ruled the original copyright holder "most derelict in preventing others from infringing his copyright" given widespread use of similar images over the decades. (Note: "... holding that findings, borne out by the evidence, that a great volume of nearly identical prints as the one which had been copyrighted had appeared over a long period, and that plaintiff's husband, the original copyright holder, had been most derelict in preventing others from infringing his copyright supported inference that copyright owner authorized or acquiesced in wide circulation of copies without notice ... the caricature was thereby dedicated to the public, barring any suit for [copyright] infringement" ... . — U.S. Appeals Court, 2nd crct. (1965))

=== Politics ===
The August 1971 cover of National Lampoon features a Frank Kelly Freas illustration that merges the features of William Calley Jr. with those of Alfred E. Neuman. The words "What, My Lai?" appear beneath the illustration.

During the presidency of George W. Bush, Neuman's features were frequently merged with those of Bush by editorial cartoonists such as Mike Luckovich and Tom Tomorrow. The image has also appeared on magazine covers, notably The Nation. A large Bush/Neuman poster was part of the Washington protests that accompanied Bush's 2001 inauguration. The alleged resemblance between the two has been noted more than once by Hillary Clinton. On April 11, 2005, speaking to reporters, she said "We're in a very dangerous fiscal situation, and this administration is Alfred E. Neuman—‌what, me worry?" On July 10, 2005, speaking at the Aspen Institute's Ideas Festival, she said, "I sometimes feel that Alfred E. Neuman is in charge in Washington," referring again to Bush's purported "What, me worry?" attitude.

At the October 2008 Alfred E. Smith Memorial Foundation Dinner, then-presidential candidate Barack Obama joked, "It's often been said that I share the politics of Alfred E. Smith. And the ears of Alfred E. Neuman."

Neuman also appeared as himself in a political cartoon after Newsweek had been criticized for using computer graphics to retouch the teeth of Bobbi McCaughey. The cartoon was rendered as a split-screen comparison, in which Neuman was featured on the cover of Mad with his usual gap-toothed grin, then featured on the cover of Newsweek, but with a perfect smile.

During an interview on May 10, 2019, President Donald Trump said "Alfred E. Neuman cannot become president of the United States", in reference to presidential candidate Pete Buttigieg. After Buttigieg said he did not know who Neuman was, Mad subsequently referenced Pete Buttigieg on social media.

Neuman's features have also been compared to others in the public eye, including Charles III, Rick Astley, Ted Koppel, Oliver North, and David Letterman. German weekly Der Spiegel merged Neuman's likeness with that of then-candidate for British Conservative Party leadership Boris Johnson for their July 20, 2019, issue.

After Ken Paxton won the Republican Nomination for Texas in the 2026 United States Senate Election in Texas, President Donald Trump repeatedly compared Democratic nominee James Talarico to Neuman.

=== Moxie Cowznofsky ===
A female version of Neuman, named "Moxie Cowznofsky", appeared briefly during the late 1950s, occasionally described in editorial text as Neuman's "girlfriend". She first appeared in Mad #44 (January 1959), and was named "Moxie Cowznofsky" in the letters column of issue #48 (July 1959). Neuman and Moxie were sometimes depicted side-by-side, defeating any speculation that Moxie was possibly Neuman in female guise. Her name was inspired by Moxie, a soft drink manufactured in Portland, Maine, which was sold nationwide in the 1950s and whose logo appeared as a running visual gag in many early issues of Mad.

== See also ==
- Mr. Chad — British graffito with similar slogan
