= John Pitney =

John Pitney may refer to:

- John J. Pitney (born 1955), American political scientist
- John Oliver Halstead Pitney (1860–1928), American lawyer from New Jersey
