= Justice Cotter =

Justice Cotter may refer to:

- John P. Cotter (1911–1993), associate justice of the Connecticut Supreme Court
- Patricia O'Brien Cotter (fl. 1970s–2010s), associate justice of the Montana Supreme Court
