= 2-Aminoacetanilide =

Chemical compound

2-aminoacetanilide
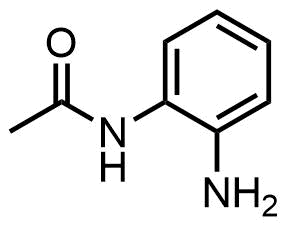

Names
- Preferred IUPAC name N-(2-Aminophenyl)acetamide
- Other names o-Aminoacetanilide, N-2-Aminophenylacetamide, 2′-Acetamidoaniline
- Identifiers
CAS Number	34801-09-7
3D model (JSmol)	Interactive image
ChemSpider	10676
ECHA InfoCard	100.156.006
PubChem CID	11149
UNII	LB34XRQ95V
CompTox Dashboard (EPA)	DTXSID4043854
- InChI: InChI=1S/C8H10N2O/c1-6(11)10-8-5-3-2-4-7(8)9/h2-5H,9H2,1H3,(H,10,11) Key: MPXAYYWSDIKNTP-UHFFFAOYSA-N
- SMILES: CC(=O)NC1=CC=CC=C1N
- Properties
Chemical formula	C_{8}H_{10}N_{2}O
Molar mass	150.18 g/mol
Appearance	Solid
Density	1.1392
Melting point	133-137
Boiling point	271.72
- Hazards
- GHS labelling
Pictograms	(GHS07: Exclamation mark)
Signal word	Warning
Hazard statements	H315, H319, H335
Precautionary statements	P261, P264, P271, P280, P302+P352, P304+P340, P305+P351+P338, P312, P321, P332+P313, P337+P313, P362, P403+P233, P405, P501
- Except where otherwise noted, data are given for materials in their standard state (at 25 °C [77 °F], 100 kPa). Infobox references

2-Aminoacetanilide is a chemical compound which is an amino derivative of acetanilide and ortho-isomer of aminoacetanilide. There are two other isomers of aminoacetanilide, 3-aminoacetanilide and 4-aminoacetanilide. Aminoacetanilide derivatives are important synthetic intermediates in heterocyclic and aromatic synthesis. These derivatives have found applications in pharmaceutical industry and dyes and pigment industry.

== Synthesis ==
Catalytic hydrogenation of 2-nitroacetanilide using 10%Pd/C gives 2-aminoacetanilide.

== Uses ==
2′-Aminoacetanilide is starting material for the synthesis of 2-methylbenzimidazole, N-(2-(1,3-Dimethyl-2,4-dioxo-5-phenyl-3,4-dihydro-1H-pyrrolo[3,4-d]pyrimidin-6(2H)-yl)phenyl)-5-methylfuran-2-carboxamide, and azobenzothiazole dyes, N-[2-(6-nitrobenzothiazol-2-ylazo)phenyl]acetamide and N-[2-(benzothiazol-2-ylazo)phenyl]acetamide. Benzimidazoles have been synthesized by cyclization of 2′-aminoacetanilide by CO_{2} in the presence of H_{2} using RuCl_{2}(dppe)_{2} as the catalyst.
