= Vernon D. Oliver =

American judge (born 1971)

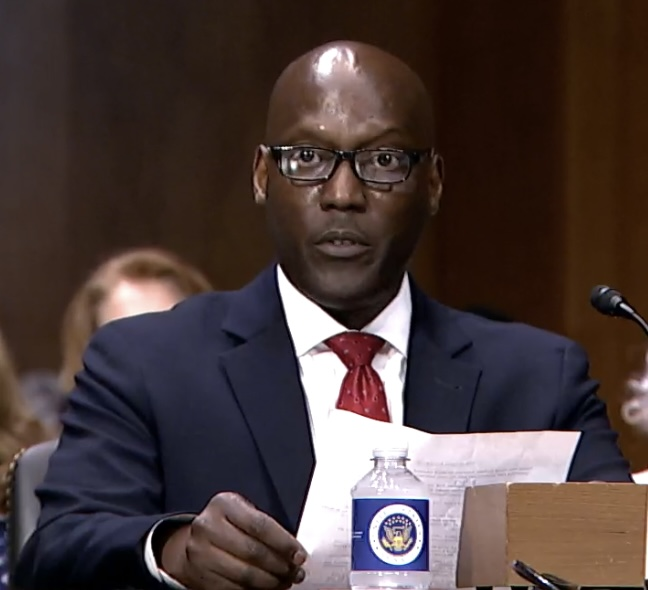

Judge of the United States District Court for the District of Connecticut
- Incumbent
- Assumed office October 18, 2023
- Appointed by: Joe Biden
- Preceded by: Stefan R. Underhill

Judge of the Connecticut Superior Court
- In office 2009 – October 18, 2023

Personal details
- Born: Vernon Dion Oliver; 1971 (age 54–55) Bridgeport, Connecticut, U.S.
- Education: University of Connecticut (BA, JD)

Vernon Dion Oliver (born 1971) is an American lawyer who has served as a United States district judge of the United States District Court for the District of Connecticut since 2023. He previously served as a judge of the Connecticut Superior Court from 2009 to 2023.

== Education ==
Oliver received a Bachelor of Arts from the University of Connecticut in 1994 and a Juris Doctor from the University of Connecticut School of Law in 1997.

== Career ==
From 1998 to 1999, he was an associate at Montstream & May LLP in Glastonbury, Connecticut. From 1999 to 2004, he served as an assistant state's attorney in the Connecticut Division of Criminal Justice. From 2004 to 2009, served as an assistant attorney general in the Connecticut Office of the Attorney General. From 2009 to 2023, he served as a judge on the Connecticut Superior Court.

From 2020 to 2023, he served as the administrative judge for the Middlesex Judicial District. During his tenure on the Connecticut Superior Court, Oliver chaired the Committee on Judicial Ethics. He served on the State Wiretap Panel and co-chaired the Connecticut Sentencing Commission.

=== Federal judicial service ===
On May 3, 2023, President Joe Biden announced his intent to nominate Oliver to serve as a United States district judge of the United States District Court for the District of Connecticut. On May 4, 2023, his nomination was sent to the Senate. President Biden nominated Oliver to the seat vacated by Judge Stefan R. Underhill, who assumed senior status on November 1, 2022. On June 7, 2023, a hearing on his nomination was held before the Senate Judiciary Committee. On July 13, 2023, his nomination was reported out of the committee by a 13–8 vote. On September 18, 2023, the United States Senate invoked cloture on his nomination by a 54–40 vote. On September 19, 2023, his nomination was confirmed by a 53–44 vote. He received his judicial commission on October 18, 2023. He was sworn in on October 19, 2023.

== See also ==
- List of African-American federal judges
- List of African-American jurists

Legal offices
Preceded by Stefan R. Underhill	Judge of the United States District Court for the District of Connecticut; 2023–present	Incumbent
