= 3-Aminoacetanilide =

Chemical compound

Names
- Preferred IUPAC name N-(3-Aminophenyl)acetamide
- Other names m-Aminoacetanilide, 3′-Acetamidoaniline, N-Acetyl-1,3-phenylenediamine
- Identifiers
CAS Number	102-28-3
3D model (JSmol)	Interactive image
ChEMBL	ChEMBL1606123
ChemSpider	7322
ECHA InfoCard	100.002.747
EC Number	203-021-5
PubChem CID	7604
UNII	Q5K7HYS7JJ
CompTox Dashboard (EPA)	DTXSID2024454
- InChI: InChI=1S/C8H10N2O/c1-6(11)10-8-4-2-3-7(9)5-8/h2-5H,9H2,1H3,(H,10,11) Key: PEMGGJDINLGTON-UHFFFAOYSA-N
- SMILES: C1(=CC=CC(=C1)N([H])[H])N(C(C)=O)[H]
- Properties
Chemical formula	C_{8}H_{10}N_{2}O
Molar mass	150.18 g/mol
Appearance	gray solid
Melting point	86-88
Solubility in water	Soluble in water 1-5 g/100 mL at 24°C.

Hazards
- GHS labelling
Pictograms	(GHS07: Exclamation mark)
Signal word	Warning
Hazard statements	H302, H315, H319, H335
Precautionary statements	P261, P264, P270, P271, P280, P301+P312, P302+P352, P304+P340, P305+P351+P338, P312, P321, P330, P332+P313, P337+P313, P362, P403+P233, P405, P501
- Except where otherwise noted, data are given for materials in their standard state (at 25 °C [77 °F], 100 kPa). Infobox references

3-Aminoacetanilide is a chemical compound which is an amino derivative of acetanilide and meta-isomer of aminoacetanilide. There are two other isomers of aminoacetanilide, 2-aminoacetanilide and 4-aminoacetanilide. Aminoacetanilide derivatives are important synthetic intermediates in heterocyclic and aromatic synthesis. These derivatives have found applications in pharmaceutical industry and dyes and pigment industry.

== Synthesis ==
A number of methods are available to synthesize 3'-aminoacetanilide. It could be prepared by reduction of m-nitroacetanilide. m-Chloroacetanilde has been converted into m-aminoacetanilide.

== Uses ==
3′-Aminoacetanilide has been used in the preparation of azo compounds, pyrrole, imidazole, thiazole and other heterocycles. It is starting material for Trametinib. It is also used to prepare reactive yellow K-RN and dispersed dye.
