= Aminoacetanilide =

Aminoacetanilide may refer to:

- 2-Aminoacetanilide
- 3-Aminoacetanilide
- 4-Aminoacetanilide, also known as paracetamin
