= Antikamnia =

Pharmaceutical manufacturer (1890–1930)

Antikamnia Chemical Company (1890–1930), named after its patent medicine Antikamnia, was an American pharmaceutical company based in St. Louis that manufactured supposed cures for pain with the main ingredient being acetanilid, which was known to be toxic. They produced a range of products with mixtures of therapeutic chemicals including both quinine and heroin. Unlike most quack cures of the time, they contained potent chemicals, but these were not carefully tested and were considered as nostrums by many physicians of the time. The company made large profits through aggressive advertising and marketing of the product targeting physicians, using physician testimonials, and finding loopholes in the Pure Food and Drug Act of 1906.

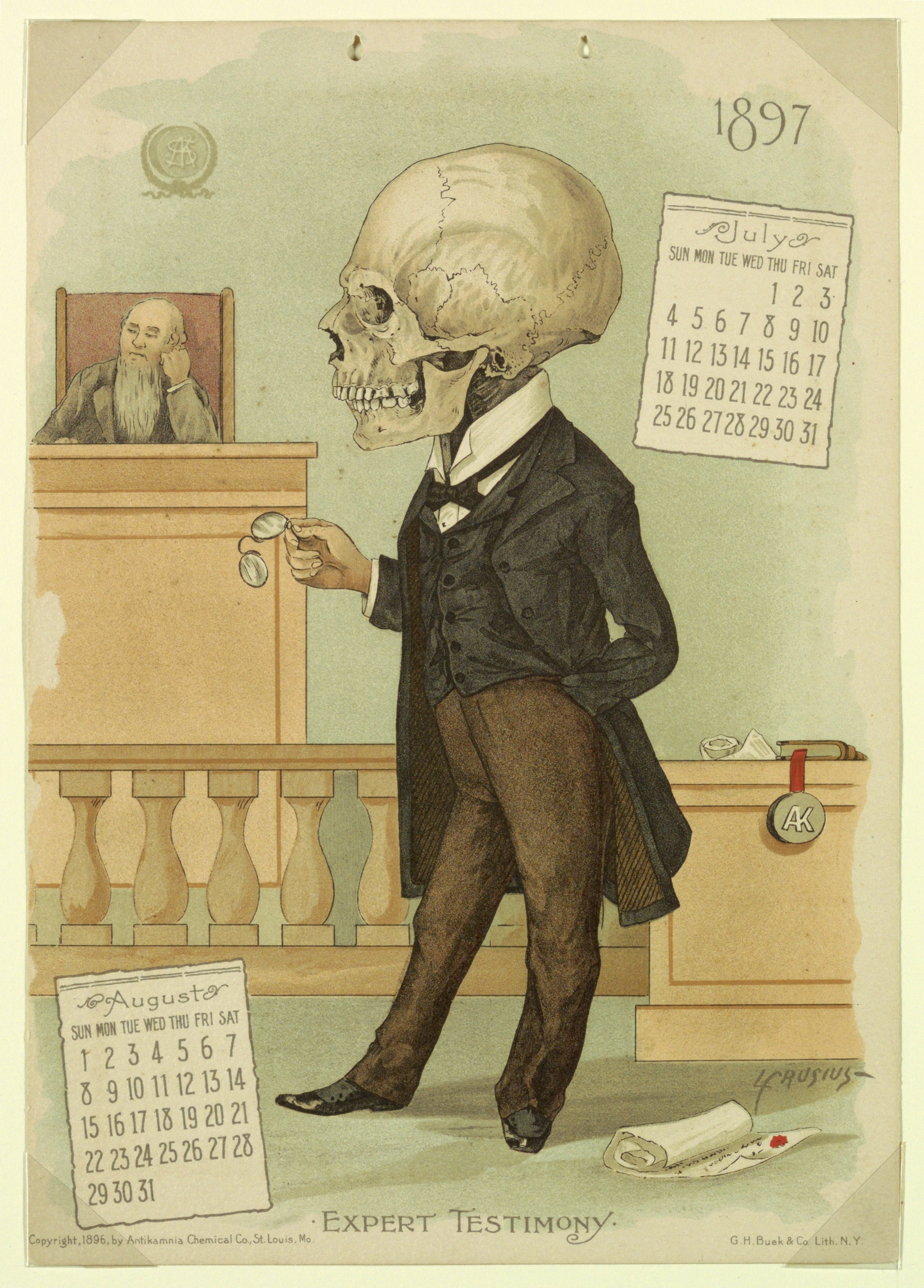
Antikamnia promotional calendar with art by Louis Crucius

== History ==
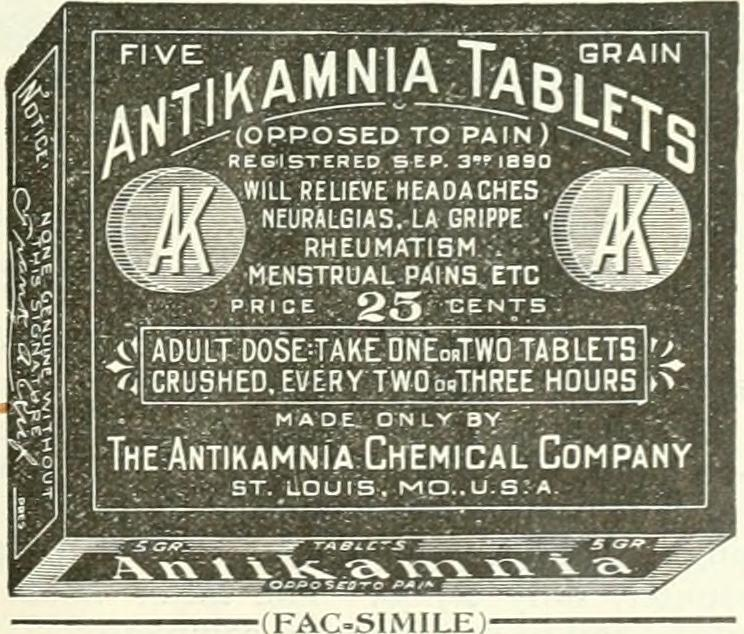
Antikamnia tablet advertisement (1889)

=== Founding ===
Antikamnia (derived from the Greek anti-, "against", and kamnia, "pain") was founded by Frank A. Ruf and Louis E. Frost, who had worked together at the Mellier Drug Company. The company was incorporated on 10 April 1890 in Illinois and expanded the following year to Missouri. Frost was a graduate of the St. Louis College of Pharmacy, while Ruf had worked as a drug clerk. Although the Antikamnia trademark was registered in 1890, the medicine itself was never patented.

=== Products ===
The company produced a number of products, all sold over the counter, including Antikamnia Powders and Tablets; Antikamnia and Codeine; Antikamnia and Quinine; Antikamnia, Quinine and Salol; and Antikamnia and Heroin. Tablets were stamped with a distinctive "AK" monogram. The manufacturer's recommended indications ranged from headaches, neuralgia, rheumatism, sciatica, colds and la grippe to "women's pains." A pamphlet titled Light on Pain, distributed on doorsteps, recommended doses for an alphabetical list of ailments including "Nervousness (overwork and excesses)" and "Shoppers' or Sightseers' Headache."

While the formulation was proprietary and officially secret, independent investigations established that the main ingredient was acetanilid, comprising half or more of the tablet (some analyses showed as high as 68 percent), with sodium bicarbonate, citric acid, and caffeine as additives. Acetanilid, a coal tar derivative, had been first synthesized by the French chemist Charles Frédéric Gerhardt in 1853, but its antipyretic (fever-reducing) properties were discovered accidentally in 1886 by Arnold Cahn and Paul Hepp in Strasbourg; in an attempt to treat a patient's intestinal worms they had mistakenly administered acetanilid instead of naphthalene and observed that it lowered the patient's fever. Early clinical tests on 24 patients found only one case of cyanosis (a symptom of acetanilid toxicity), and that patient recovered promptly, leading to a false sense of the compound's safety.

Several Antikamnia products, including Antikamnia and Heroin Tablets and Antikamnia and Codeine Tablets, survive as artifacts in the collection of the National Museum of American History at the Smithsonian Institution.

=== Advertising and marketing ===
Antikamnia occupied an unusual position in the patent-medicine market. Rather than advertising directly to consumers in newspapers, as most nostrums did, the company styled itself as an "ethical" preparation and marketed primarily to physicians through advertisements in medical journals and through direct mailings of promotional materials and free samples. Its advertisements in "most of the high-class medical journals" included claims such as "Do not depress the heart. Do not produce habit. Are accurate, safe, sure," which the journalist Samuel Hopkins Adams described as "five distinct and separate lies" in a "triumph of condensed mendacity."

The company also circulated promotional goods, most notably a series of illustrated calendars for the years 1897 to 1901 featuring elaborate chromolithograph images of skeletons drawn by the St. Louis anatomist and artist Louis Crucius (1862–1898). These calendars were sent in limited editions to physicians in the United States and Europe and have since become highly collectible.

=== Poisoning cases and medical criticism ===
The first death attributed to Antikamnia was reported in 1891, followed by an increasing number of cases over the years. A 1907 article in the California State Journal of Medicine titled "Poisoning by Antikamnia" described a patient who was found "practically without pulse, cyanosed, with shallow breathing, and a 'leaky skin'." Adams recounted the case of a man who had been prescribed Antikamnia by his physician for insomnia and had gradually increased his intake to approximately twelve tablets per day; on collapsing, the patient "was greatly surprised to learn that this habit was responsible for his condition" and had never been warned of the dangerous character of the drug.

The American Medical Association (AMA) became increasingly critical of the products. Several articles in AMA publications described the company's practices as the "Antikamnia Fraud." One physician, M. V. Ball, cancelled his subscription to the Journal of the American Medical Association in protest at its carrying Antikamnia advertisements. Adams himself, writing in the California State Journal of Medicine in 1906, named Antikamnia as a leading example of how "ethical" nostrums exploited physicians' trust while concealing known dangers from patients.

=== Exposure by Samuel Hopkins Adams ===
Antikamnia featured prominently in Samuel Hopkins Adams's landmark muckraking series The Great American Fraud, first published in Collier's Weekly in 1905–1906 and later reprinted as a book. Adams described Antikamnia as "an 'ethical' proprietary compound" that "for a long time exploited itself to the profession by a campaign of ridiculous extravagance, and is to-day by the extent of its reckless use on the part of ignorant laymen a public menace." In Chapter IV ("The Subtle Poisons"), Adams devoted particular attention to the company, noting that its product "was at first exploited as a 'new synthetical coal-tar derivative,' which it isn't and never was" and was "simply half or more acetanilid... with other unimportant ingredients in varying proportions." Adams's series is widely credited with helping to build public support for the passage of the Pure Food and Drug Act of 1906.

=== Pure Food and Drug Act and legal proceedings ===
After the Pure Food and Drug Act of 1906 was passed, requiring labels to indicate the presence of dangerous drugs including acetanilid, the company substituted acetanilid with the less toxic derivative acetphenetidin (phenacetin) in its domestic products and advertised that Antikamnia was now "acetanilide-free." In 1910, United States marshals seized a shipment of Antikamnia tablets at the Wholesale Drug Exchange in Washington, D.C., initiating a federal libel action for violation of the Food and Drugs Act. The government alleged that the labeling was misleading because it listed acetphenetidin without disclosing that acetphenetidin was a derivative of acetanilid. The company argued that the statute did not require such disclosure.

The company prevailed at the trial level, but the government appealed. The case was argued before the Supreme Court of the United States on 9 December 1913 and decided on 5 January 1914. In United States v. Antikamnia Chemical Co., 231 U.S. 654 (1914), Justice McKenna, writing for the Court, ruled in favor of the government, holding that the purpose of the Food and Drugs Act was "to secure purity of food and drugs and to inform purchasers of what they are buying" and that its labeling requirements extended to derivatives of listed substances, not merely the primary substances themselves. The ruling was considered a landmark decision in support of Progressive Era consumer-protection regulation, confirming that administrative agencies can enforce regulations related to the act that they are charged with implementing. To be valid, such regulations need to be administrative in nature and cannot expand the terms of the law.

=== Decline and dissolution ===
In 1919 the company renamed itself the Antikamnia Remedy Company. Frank A. Ruf died a millionaire in 1923; he had diversified his investments, started several other businesses, become an art collector, and risen into high society in St. Louis. The company declined after his death and was bought by Block Drug Company in 1930. Louis Frost, who had run several drug stores in St. Louis, moved to Springfield, Illinois, in 1906 and became the editor of a farm journal, The Berkshire World.

== See also ==
- Patent medicine
- Pure Food and Drug Act
- The Great American Fraud
- Antikamnia calendars
- Acetanilide
