= John P. Cotter =

American judge (1911–1993)

John Patrick Cotter (March 2, 1911 – March 16, 1993) was a justice of the Connecticut Supreme Court from 1965 to 1981, serving as chief justice from 1978 to 1981.

== Early life, education, and career ==
Born in Hartford, Connecticut, Cotter was a truck driver during the Great Depression, receiving a B.S. in history and economics from Trinity College in 1933, and a J.D. from Harvard Law School in 1936. He entered the practice of law with the Hartford firm of Day, Berry and Howard until 1938, when he opened his own practice. In 1941, he became prosecuting attorney of the Hartford Police Court.

He served in the Connecticut House of Representatives from 1947 to 1950, where he was the House Democratic floor leader.

== Judicial career ==
In 1950, Governor Chester Bowles appointed Cotter to the Court of Common Pleas, and in 1955 Governor Abraham Ribicoff elevated him to the Superior Court, where Cotter bristled at the tendency of lawyers to continually seek to put off scheduled trials due to lack of preparation.

In 1965, Cotter was appointed to the Connecticut Supreme Court, where he was initially a frequent dissenter. As the composition of the court became more liberal, Cotter's dissents became majority opinions. As Chief Justice of Connecticut, Cotter oversaw the consolidation of the state's disorganized court system into its current structure.

== Personal life ==
Cotter and his wife Jeanette had a son and two daughters. Cotter died in a nursing home in Bloomfield, Connecticut at the age of 82.

Political offices
| Preceded by Newly created seat | Justice of the Connecticut Supreme Court; 1965–1978 | Succeeded by Ellen Ash Peters |
| Preceded by Charles S. House | Chief Justice of the Connecticut Supreme Court; 1978–1981 | Succeeded by Joseph W. Bogdanski |
