= Defenuron =

Chemical compound

- Skeletal formula of defenuron

Names
- Preferred IUPAC name 1-methyl-3-phenylurea
- Other names: N-methyl-N'-phenylurea; N-phenyl-N'-methylurea; Desfenuron

Identifiers
CAS Number	1007-36-9
3D model (JSmol)	Interactive image
ChEBI	CHEBI:157705
ChEMBL	ChEMBL584381
ChemSpider	13280
ECHA InfoCard	100.151.228
EC Number	622-469-6
KEGG	C22322
PubChem CID	13880
UNII	11YB479454
CompTox Dashboard (EPA)	DTXSID1074416
- InChI: InChI=1S/C8H10N2O/c1-9-8(11)10-7-5-3-2-4-6-7/h2-6H,1H3,(H2,9,10,11) Key: SQBHGDSDVWCPHN-UHFFFAOYSA-N
- SMILES: CNC(=O)NC1=CC=CC=C1

Properties
Chemical formula	C_{8}H_{10}N_{2}O
Molar mass	150.181 g·mol^{−1}

Hazards
- GHS labelling
Pictograms	(GHS05: Corrosive) (GHS07: Exclamation mark)
Signal word	Danger
Hazard statements	H317, H318
Precautionary statements	P261, P264+P265, P272, P280, P302+P352, P305+P354+P338, P317, P321, P333+P317, P362+P364, P501
- Except where otherwise noted, data are given for materials in their standard state (at 25 °C [77 °F], 100 kPa). Infobox references

Defenuron is an obsolete herbicide. Its formula is C_{8}H_{10}N_{2}O. It is an urea herbicide and was once produced as a wettable powder to control undesirable grasses and broad-leaved plants in a variety of crops. It enters plants via diffusion and moves through the xylem. It is highly water-soluble, is of low toxicity to fish, and does not pose a significant health hazard to mammals or to Japanese quail.
