= Michael P. Shea =

American judge (born 1967)

Michael Shea
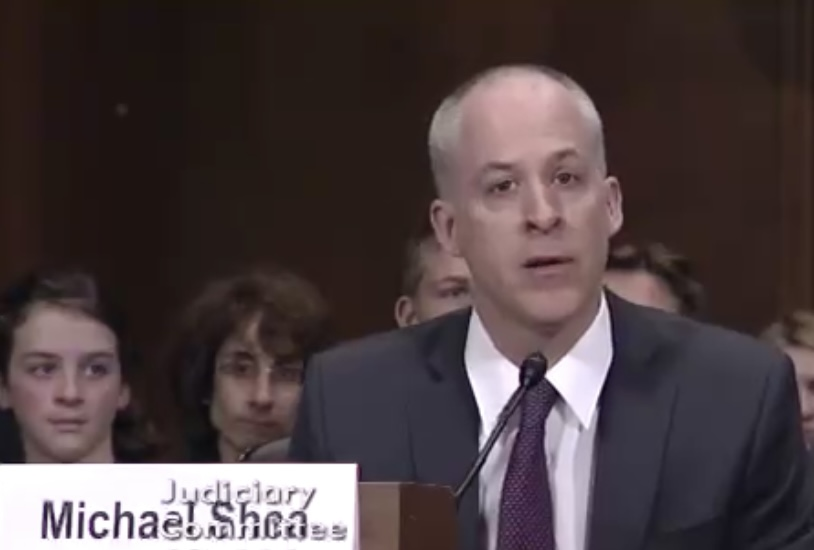

Chief Judge of the United States District Court for the District of Connecticut
- Incumbent
- Assumed office November 1, 2022
- Preceded by: Stefan R. Underhill

Judge of the United States District Court for the District of Connecticut
- Incumbent
- Assumed office December 7, 2012
- Appointed by: Barack Obama
- Preceded by: Christopher F. Droney

Personal details
- Born: Michael Peter Shea; April 17, 1967 (age 58) Hartford, Connecticut, U.S.
- Education: Amherst College (BA); Yale University (JD)

Michael Peter Shea (born April 17, 1967) is the chief United States district judge of the United States District Court for the District of Connecticut.

== Biography ==
Born in April 1967 in Hartford, Connecticut, Shea received his Bachelor of Arts degree, summa cum laude, in 1989 from Amherst College. He received his Juris Doctor in 1993 from Yale Law School. He served as a law clerk to United States Circuit Judge James L. Buckley of the United States Court of Appeals for the District of Columbia Circuit from 1993 to 1994. He worked at Cleary, Gottlieb, Steen & Hamilton LLP as an associate and then joined Day Pitney as an associate in 1998 and became a partner in that firm in 2003. At Day Pitney, he chaired the firm's Appellate Practice Group, while also representing individuals, non-profits and corporations in civil and criminal cases. In private practice, he argued twenty civil and criminal appeals in state and federal courts.

== Federal judicial service ==
On February 2, 2012, President Barack Obama nominated Shea to be United States District Judge for the United States District Court for the District of Connecticut. He was nominated to a seat vacated by Judge Christopher F. Droney, who was elevated to the United States Court of Appeals for the Second Circuit on December 1, 2011. He received a hearing before the Senate Judiciary Committee on March 28, 2012 and his nomination was reported to the floor on April 26, 2012, by a 15–3 vote, with Senators Lee, Coburn and Cornyn casting the no votes. The Senate confirmed his nomination on December 5, 2012, by a 72–23 vote. He received his commission on December 7, 2012. He became chief judge on November 1, 2022.

Legal offices
| Preceded by Christopher F. Droney | Judge of the United States District Court for the District of Connecticut; 2012–present | Incumbent |
| Preceded by Stefan R. Underhill | Chief Judge of the United States District Court for the District of Connecticut; 2022–present | Incumbent |
