= Nitroacetanilide =

4-Nitroacetanilide

Names
- Preferred IUPAC name N-(4-Nitrophenyl)acetamide
- Other names p-Acetamidonitrobenzene; p-Nitroacetanilide; N-Acetyl-4-nitroaniline

Identifiers
CAS Number	104-04-1
3D model (JSmol)	Interactive image
ChEMBL	ChEMBL131469
ChemSpider	7407
ECHA InfoCard	100.002.881
EC Number	203-169-0
PubChem CID	7691
UNII	PH3B066365
CompTox Dashboard (EPA)	DTXSID5059290
- InChI: InChI=1S/C8H8N2O3/c1-6(11)9-7-2-4-8(5-3-7)10(12)13/h2-5H,1H3,(H,9,11) Key: NQRLPDFELNCFHW-UHFFFAOYSA-N; InChI=1/C8H8N2O3/c1-6(11)9-7-2-4-8(5-3-7)10(12)13/h2-5H,1H3,(H,9,11) Key: NQRLPDFELNCFHW-UHFFFAOYAB
- SMILES: O=C(Nc1ccc(cc1)[N+]([O-])=O)C

Properties
Chemical formula	C_{8}H_{8}N_{2}O_{3}
Molar mass	180.16 g/mol
Appearance	Solid, white-green or brown
Density	1.34 g/cm^{3}
Melting point	215 °C (419 °F; 488 K)
Boiling point	408.9 °C (768.0 °F; 682.0 K)

Hazards
- Occupational safety and health (OHS/OSH)
Main hazards	Irritant
- GHS labelling
Pictograms	(GHS07: Exclamation mark)
Signal word	Warning
Hazard statements	H315, H319, H335
Precautionary statements	P261, P264, P271, P280, P302+P352, P304+P340, P305+P351+P338, P312, P332+P313, P337+P313, P362, P403+P233, P405, P501
- Except where otherwise noted, data are given for materials in their standard state (at 25 °C [77 °F], 100 kPa). verify (what is ?) Infobox references

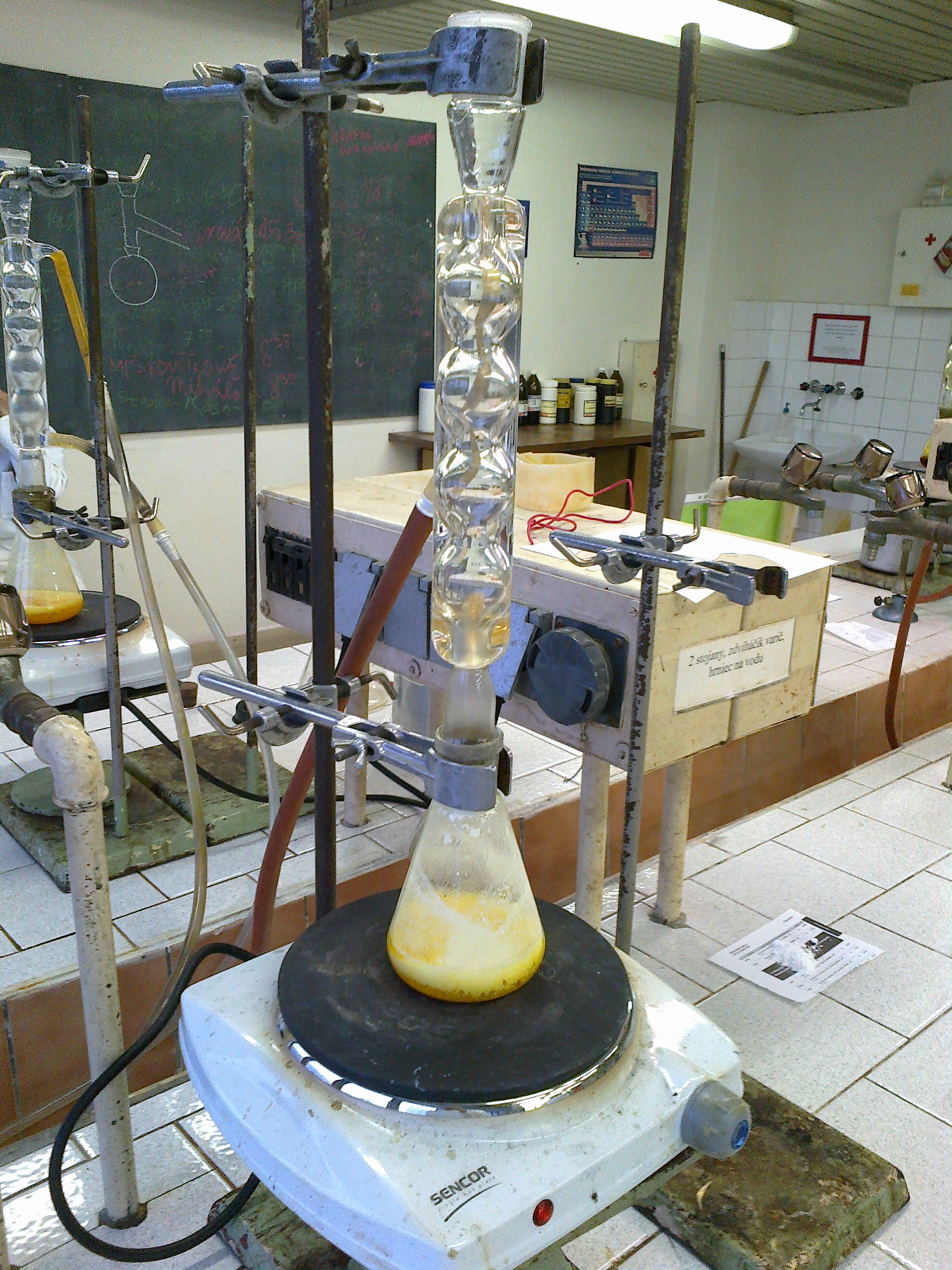
Deacylation of nitroacetanilide

4-Nitroacetanilide is a chemical compound which is a nitro derivative of acetanilide. There are two other isomers of nitroacetanilide, 2-nitroacetanilide and 3-nitroacetanilide.

4-Nitroacetanilide is used as in intermediate in the production of some dyes.
