= Paul Van Dyke =

Paul Van Dyke (1859–1933) was an American historian and the brother of Henry Van Dyke.

He was born in Brooklyn, New York, graduated from Princeton in 1881 and from Princeton Theological Seminary in 1884, and studied at Berlin in 1884–85. He was a Presbyterian minister at Geneva, N. Y. in 1887–89, then taught church history at Princeton Theological Seminary (1889–92).

After serving as pastor at the Edwards Congregational Church in Northampton, Mass. (1892–98), he held the chair of modern European history at Princeton. He wrote The Age of the Renascence (1897), volume seven in a ten-volume series titled "Ten Epochs of Church History". In 1905, he published his book Renascence Portraits, which "...tries to illustrate the Renascence by describing three men who were affected by it and who were all living at the same time in Italy, England and Germany" (the three men are Pietro Aretino, Thomas Cromwell, and Maximilian I, Holy Roman Emperor).In 1921–22 and 1928–29, Van Dyke directed the Continental division of the American University Union in Europe, which was based in Paris. He wrote the biography Ignatius Loyola the founder of the Jesuits in 1979 He was elected to the National Institute of Arts and Letters in 1927. At Princeton Theological Seminary, he taught classes using the German "seminar" method.

When he joined the faculty of Princeton College in 1898, he was Chair of History and Political Science.
