= Stefan R. Underhill =

American judge (born 1956)

Senior Judge of the United States District Court for the District of Connecticut
- Incumbent
- Assumed office November 1, 2022

Chief Judge of the United States District Court for the District of Connecticut
- In office September 9, 2018 – November 1, 2022
- Preceded by: Janet C. Hall
- Succeeded by: Michael P. Shea

Judge of the United States District Court for the District of Connecticut
- In office July 7, 1999 – November 1, 2022
- Appointed by: Bill Clinton
- Preceded by: Peter Collins Dorsey
- Succeeded by: Vernon D. Oliver

Personal details
- Born: June 9, 1956 (age 69) Battle Creek, Michigan, U.S.
- Education: University of Virginia (BA); Merton College, Oxford (BA); Yale University (JD)

Stefan Richard Underhill (born June 9, 1956) is a senior United States district judge of the United States District Court for the District of Connecticut.

== Education ==
Born in Battle Creek, Michigan in 1956, after earning a Bachelor of Arts degree in 1978 from the University of Virginia and a Bachelor of Arts degree from Oxford University (Merton College, Oxford) in 1981, he received a Juris Doctor from Yale Law School.

== Career ==
Underhill clerked for Judge Jon O. Newman of the United States Court of Appeals for the Second Circuit. He was in private practice in Stamford, Connecticut in 1984 and from 1985 to 1999.

=== Federal judicial service ===
Underhill was nominated by President Bill Clinton to fill a seat on the United States District Court for the District of Connecticut vacated by Peter Collins Dorsey on January 26, 1999, and was confirmed by the United States Senate on June 30, 1999. He received his commission on July 7, 1999. He became chief judge in September 2018. He assumed senior status on November 1, 2022.

=== Notable case ===
Underhill ruled in 2010 that cheerleading could not be used by Quinnipiac University to replace women's volleyball as a female sport to satisfy Title IX requirements (Biediger, et al., v. Quinnipiac University).

== Sources ==
Legal offices
Preceded by Peter Collins Dorsey	Judge of the United States District Court for the District of Connecticut; 1999–2022	Succeeded by Vernon D. Oliver
Preceded by Janet C. Hall	Chief Judge of the United States District Court for the District of Connecticut; 2018–2022	Succeeded by Michael P. Shea
