= John Oliver Halstead Pitney =

American lawyer

- Born: April 14, 1860; Morristown, New Jersey, U.S.
- Died: October 6, 1928 (aged 68); Newark, New Jersey, U.S.
- Education: Princeton University
- Known for: Founder of Pitney Hardin

John Oliver Halstead Pitney (April 14, 1860 – October 6, 1928) was an American lawyer from New Jersey.

== Early life and education ==
Born in Morristown, New Jersey to Henry Cooper and Sarah Louise (Halsted) Pitney, Pitney was "a member of one of New Jersey's oldest families", described by Kim Isaac Eisler as a New Jersey blue-blood. His great-grandfather Henry Cooper Pitney served in the American Revolutionary War. Pitney's father and his older brother Mahlon Pitney were also lawyers; Mahlon eventually served on the United States Supreme Court.

Pitney attended the Morris Academy, and received a B.A. from Princeton University in 1881 followed by an M.A. from the same institution in 1884. He was a member of Phi Beta Kappa. He read law under his father and gained admission to the bar in New Jersey at the June term of 1884 as an attorney, and three years later as a counselor.

== Career ==
Establishing himself in Newark, he partnered with Frederick H. Heese for the first ten years of his practice. In 1902, he and John R. Hardin founded the law firm of Pitney & Hardin, later Pitney Hardin and Ward, in Newark; his brother Mahlon also worked at the firm for a time, and has sometimes been incorrectly credited as a founder. According to Eisler, the firm's clients included "some of the most notoriously antilabor corporations in the state", and because of its strike-breaking work it was known in the labor movement as "Pluck'em, Hook'em and Sink'em".

Pitney was elected to the Board of the United Electric Company of New Jersey in March 1901 and also served at various times as a director of the Mutual Benefit Life Insurance Company and the American Insurance Company and a Trustee of Princeton University. He was described as "an earnest Republican" who refused official positions on grounds of lack of time; beginning in August 1917, he served as Chairman of the District Board for the Second Division of New Jersey under the War Department's administration of the Selective Service Law.

Pitney published a book about the history of his family in 1925. The University of Chicago holds a letter to Pitney from William Howard Taft, accepting an invitation to attend a celebration of the birth of George Washington.

== Personal life and death ==
On January 16, 1890, Pitney married Roberta A. Ballantine of Newark. They had two children, John B., born in 1892, and Robert H., born in 1907.

Pitney died of a heart attack at his home in Newark at the age of 68, following a period of poor health.
