= Mahlon Pitney =

US Supreme Court justice from 1912 to 1922

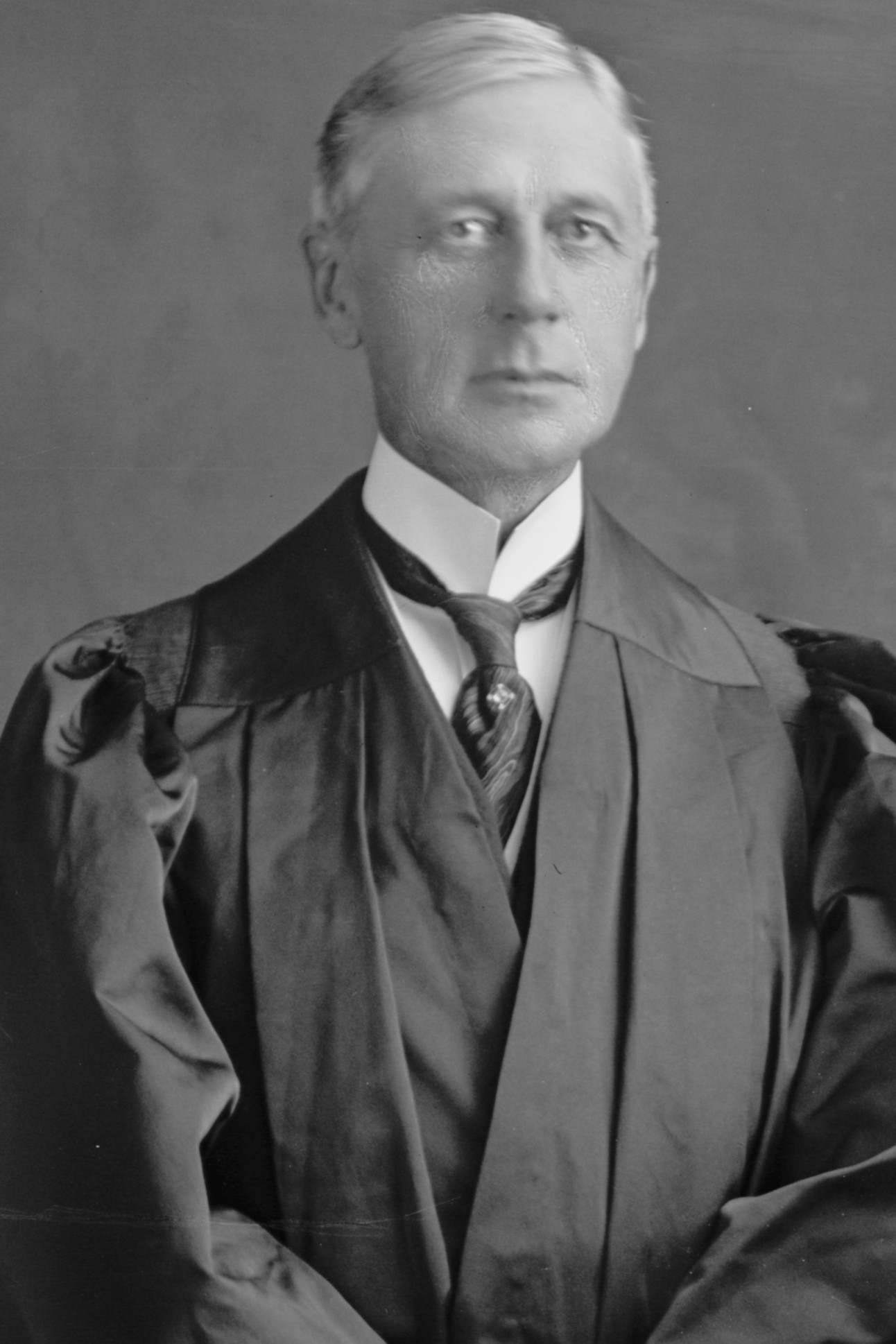
- Pitney in 1916

Associate Justice of the Supreme Court of the United States
- In office March 18, 1912 – December 31, 1922
- Nominated by: William Taft
- Preceded by: John Marshall Harlan
- Succeeded by: Edward Terry Sanford

Member of the U.S. House of Representatives from New Jersey's 4th district
- In office March 4, 1895 – January 10, 1899
- Preceded by: Johnston Cornish
- Succeeded by: Joshua Salmon

Personal details
- Born: February 5, 1858 Morristown, New Jersey, U.S.
- Died: December 9, 1924 (aged 66) Washington, D.C., U.S.
- Resting place: Evergreen Cemetery in Morristown, New Jersey
- Party: Republican
- Spouse: Florence Shelton (m. 1891)
- Children: 3, including Beatrice Pitney Lamb
- Education: Princeton University (BA)
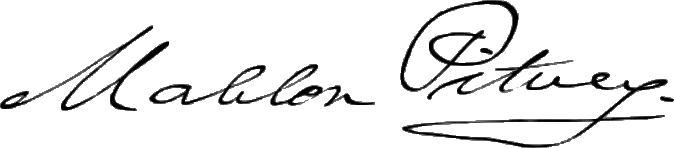
- Signature

Mahlon R. Pitney IV (February 5, 1858 – December 9, 1924) was an American lawyer, jurist, and politician who served in the U.S. House of Representatives for two terms from 1895 to 1899. He later served as an associate justice of the U.S. Supreme Court from 1912 to 1922.

== Early life and education ==
Pitney was born on February 5, 1858, in Morristown, New Jersey. The American Pitney family dates back to 1720 when two Scots—Johnathan and James Pitney—settled the Pitney farm in Mendham Township, New Jersey. James's son, Mahlon Pitney, fought in the American Revolutionary War alongside George Washington. Mahlon Pitney IV was born in Morristown, the son of Sarah Louise (née Halsted) and Henry Cooper Pitney. He attended the College of New Jersey (now Princeton University) where he was a classmate of Woodrow Wilson and served as manager of the campus baseball team. Upon graduation in 1879, he read law at his father's practice. Pitney passed the bar exam in 1882 and set up a private practice in Dover, working for a time in partnership with his brother, John Oliver Halstead Pitney.

He returned to Morristown in 1889 to assume control of his father's law firm, after Henry Pitney was appointed to a judgeship. Pitney married Florence Shelton in 1891. The couple had three children, and both of their sons attended Princeton University and later entered into the field of law. Pitney was the great-grandfather of actor Christopher Reeve on Reeve's mother's side, as well as his step great-grandfather on his father's side. Christopher Reeve's maternal grandmother was Beatrice Pitney, and his paternal grandmother married Mahlon Pitney IV.

== Political career ==
=== Congress ===
In 1894, Pitney ran for the United States House of Representatives. He defeated one-term incumbent Johnston Cornish for the seat from New Jersey's 4th congressional district, and was reelected to a second term two years later. Pitney served as chairman of the 1895 state Republican convention and pushed for the nomination of John W. Griggs as party gubernatorial candidate. A rising star in state politics, Pitney aspired to be elected as governor.

=== State office ===
In order to further improve his local standing, he resigned from the House prior to the end of his second term and ran for election to the New Jersey Senate; Pitney was victorious in this 1898 race. In the legislature, he took on the role of party floor leader and, after the 1900 election, swayed body control to the Republicans. Later, Pitney became Senate President.

== Judicial career ==
Despite Pitney's desire to become the state's chief executive, Governor Foster M. Voorhees supported a different candidate as his successor. In 1901 Voorhees offered Pitney a seat on the New Jersey Supreme Court, which rid Voorhees of a political rival while maintaining party unity. Seven years later, Pitney was elevated to the role of Chancellor of New Jersey, a unique judicial position under the state's 1844 constitution.

== Supreme Court of the United States ==
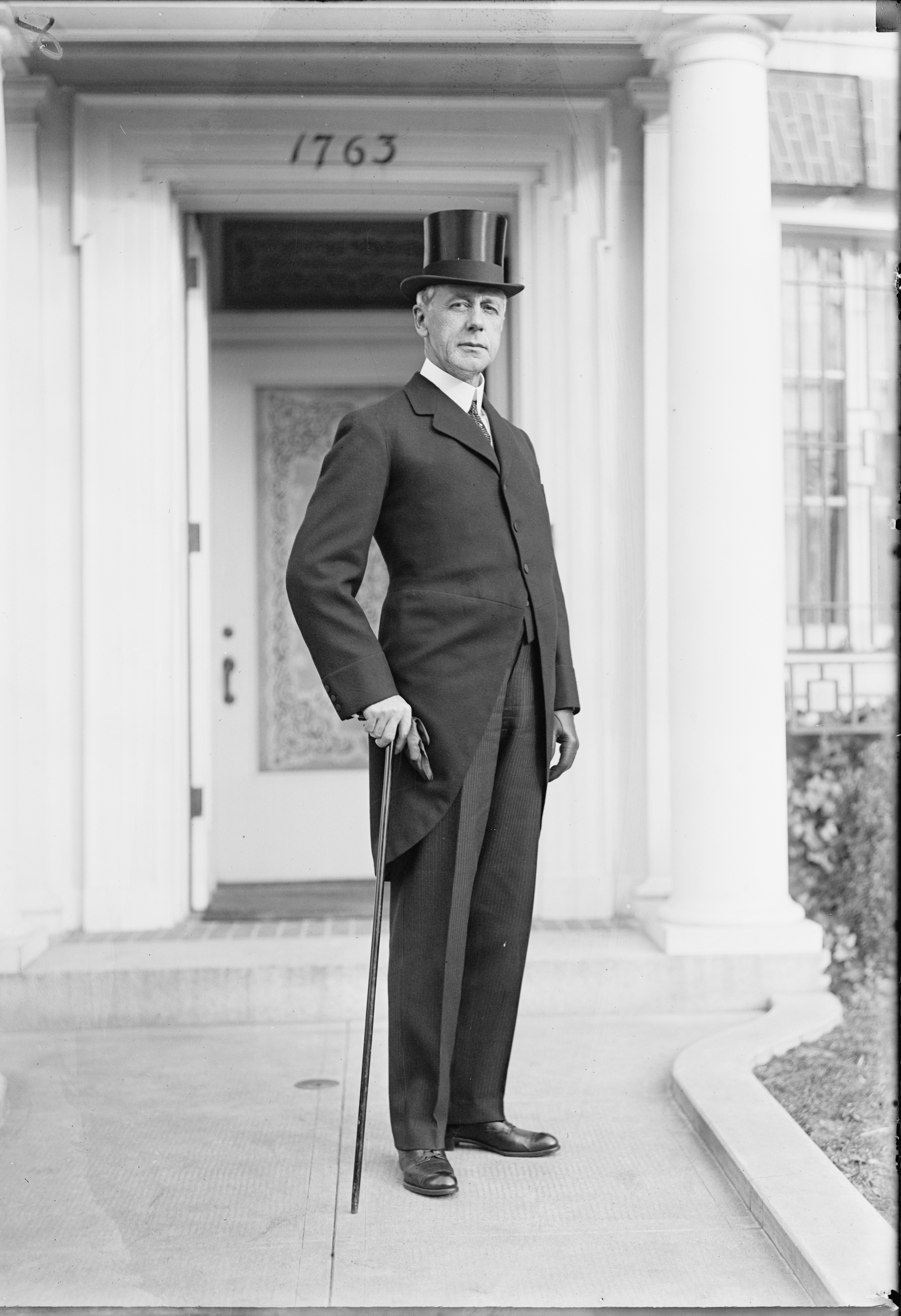
Pitney at his home in Washington, D.C., in 1913

Pitney was nominated by President William Howard Taft on February 19, 1912, to be an associate justice of the Supreme Court of the United States, to succeed John Marshall Harlan. He was confirmed by the U.S. Senate on March 13, 1912, by a 50–26 vote, and was sworn into office on March 18, 1912. Although confirmed by a wide margin, the nomination was opposed by progressives. This hostility was particularly due to Pitney's decision while serving as chancellor in Jones Glass Co. v. Glass Bottle Blowers Association, which limited the ability of unions to prevent their employers from using strikebreakers.

During his time on the court, Pitney developed a relatively conservative reputation and was an adherent of the judicial philosophy of substantive due process. This belief was exemplified in his majority opinion in Coppage v. Kansas, where, in ruling unconstitutional a Kansas statute banning anti-union yellow-dog contracts, the court stated that police power could not be legitimately used to ensure equality of bargaining power. Although distrustful of unions, Pitney also feared the rampant expansion of business and supported a broader use of the Sherman Antitrust Act.

Justice Pitney authored the majority opinion in New York Central Railroad Co. v. White, in which the Court upheld a New York state workman's compensation law and laid the foundation for the expansion of these programs nationwide. He also wrote the controversial majority opinion in Frank v. Mangum, which upheld the wrongful 1915 murder conviction of Leo Frank, a Jewish businessman, in Atlanta, Georgia, over the dissents of Justices Oliver Wendell Holmes and Charles Evans Hughes.

Pitney resigned from the court in 1922 after suffering a stroke. Alongside Willis Van Devanter, Pitney was one of only two Supreme Court Justices nominated by President Taft who also later served with Taft during Taft's chief justiceship.

== Death and legacy ==
Pitney died in 1924 in Washington, D.C., and was interred at Evergreen Cemetery, in Morristown, New Jersey.

When asked which twentieth-century Supreme Court justice "has done the most to protect the core Constitutional values," Richard Epstein cited Justice Pitney, calling him "a great justice" and "the only consistent near-libertarian on the Supreme Court." His daughter Beatrice Pitney Lamb was a writer on political topics, and the grandmother of actor Christopher Reeve.

U.S. House of Representatives
Preceded by Johnston Cornish	Member of the U.S. House of Representatives from New Jersey's 4th congressional district 1895–1899	Succeeded by Joshua Salmon
Political offices
Preceded by William Johnson	President of the New Jersey Senate; 1901	Succeeded by C. Asa Francis
Legal offices
Preceded by John Marshall Harlan	Associate Justice of the Supreme Court of the United States; 1912–1922	Succeeded by Edward Sanford
