= Kim Isaac Eisler =

American writer

- Other name: Kim Eisler
- Occupation: Writer
- Known for: Masters of the Game

Kim Isaac Eisler is an American writer. He has been a columnist for Washingtonian Magazine and is the author of several books.

One of his areas of focus has been legal affairs, two of his books being on law firms, while a third is a biography of Supreme Court Justice William J. Brennan Jr.

He is also a fan of race horses, and invented the Eisler Handicapping System.

== Bibliography ==
1. Kim Isaac Eisler (1990). Shark Tank: Greed, Politics, and the Collapse of Finley Kumble, One of America's Largest Law Firms. Beard Books. ISBN 9781587982385.
2. Kim Isaac Eisler (2002). Revenge of the Pequots: How a Small Native American Tribe Created the World's Most Profitable Casino. U of Nebraska Press. ISBN 9780803267459.
3. Kim Isaac Eisler (1993). A Justice for All: Justice William J. Brennan, Jr., and the Decisions That Transformed America. Simon & Schuster. ISBN 0671767879.
4. Kim Isaac Eisler (2003). The Last Liberal: Justice William J. Brennan, Jr., and the Decisions That Transformed America. Beard Books. ISBN 9781587982712.
5. Kim Eisler (2010). Masters of the Game: Inside the World's Most Powerful Law Firm. Macmillan Publishers. ISBN 9781429921190.
