= Acetanilide =

Chemical compound C6H5NHC(O)CH3

- Acetanilide

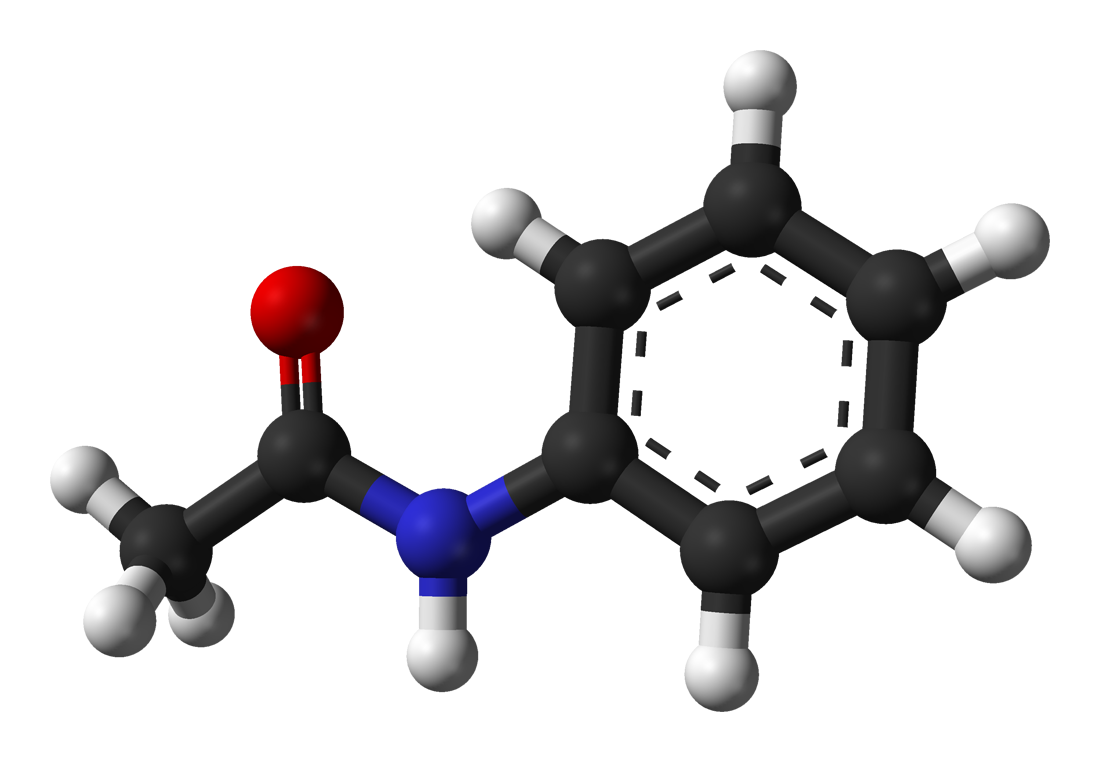

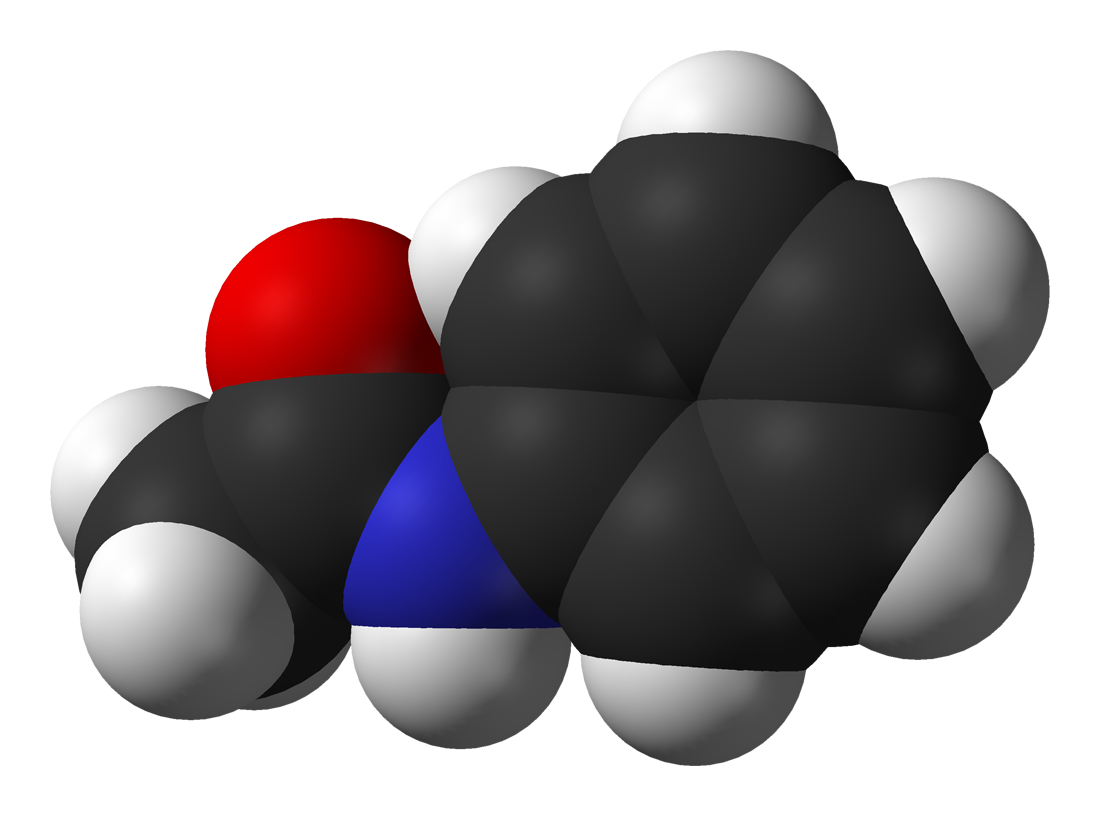

Names
- Preferred IUPAC name N-Phenylacetamide
- Other names: Acetanilide; N-Phenylethanamide

Identifiers
CAS Number	103-84-4
3D model (JSmol)	Interactive image
Beilstein Reference	606468
ChEBI	CHEBI:28884
ChEMBL	ChEMBL269644
ChemSpider	880
ECHA InfoCard	100.002.864
EC Number	203-150-7
Gmelin Reference	82833
KEGG	C07565
PubChem CID	904
RTECS number	AD7350000
UNII	SP86R356CC
CompTox Dashboard (EPA)	DTXSID2022543
- InChI: InChI=1S/C8H9NO/c1-7(10)9-8-5-3-2-4-6-8/h2-6H,1H3,(H,9,10) Key: FZERHIULMFGESH-UHFFFAOYSA-N; InChI=1/C8H9NO/c1-7(10)9-8-5-3-2-4-6-8/h2-6H,1H3,(H,9,10) Key: FZERHIULMFGESH-UHFFFAOYAA
- SMILES: O=C(Nc1ccccc1)C

Properties
Chemical formula	C_{8}H_{9}NO
Molar mass	135.166 g·mol^{−1}
Odor	Odorless
Density	1.219 g/cm^{3}
Melting point	113–115 °C (235–239 °F; 386–388 K)
Boiling point	304 °C (579 °F; 577 K)
Solubility in water	<0.56 g/100 mL (25 °C)
Solubility in ethanol	soluble
Solubility in diethyl ether	soluble
Solubility in acetone	soluble
Solubility in benzene	soluble
log P	1.16 (23 °C (73 °F; 296 K))
Vapor pressure	2 Pa (20 °C (68 °F; 293 K))
Acidity (pK_{a})	0.5 (25 °C (77 °F; 298 K), H_{2}O) (conjugate acid)
Dipole moment	2.71

Hazards
- GHS labelling
Pictograms	
Signal word	Warning
Hazard statements	H302, H373
Precautionary statements	P264, P270, P301+P312, P330, P501
Flash point	174 °C (345 °F; 447 K)
Autoignition temperature	545 °C (1,013 °F; 818 K)
- Safety data sheet (SDS)
- Except where otherwise noted, data are given for materials in their standard state (at 25 °C [77 °F], 100 kPa). verify (what is ?) Infobox references

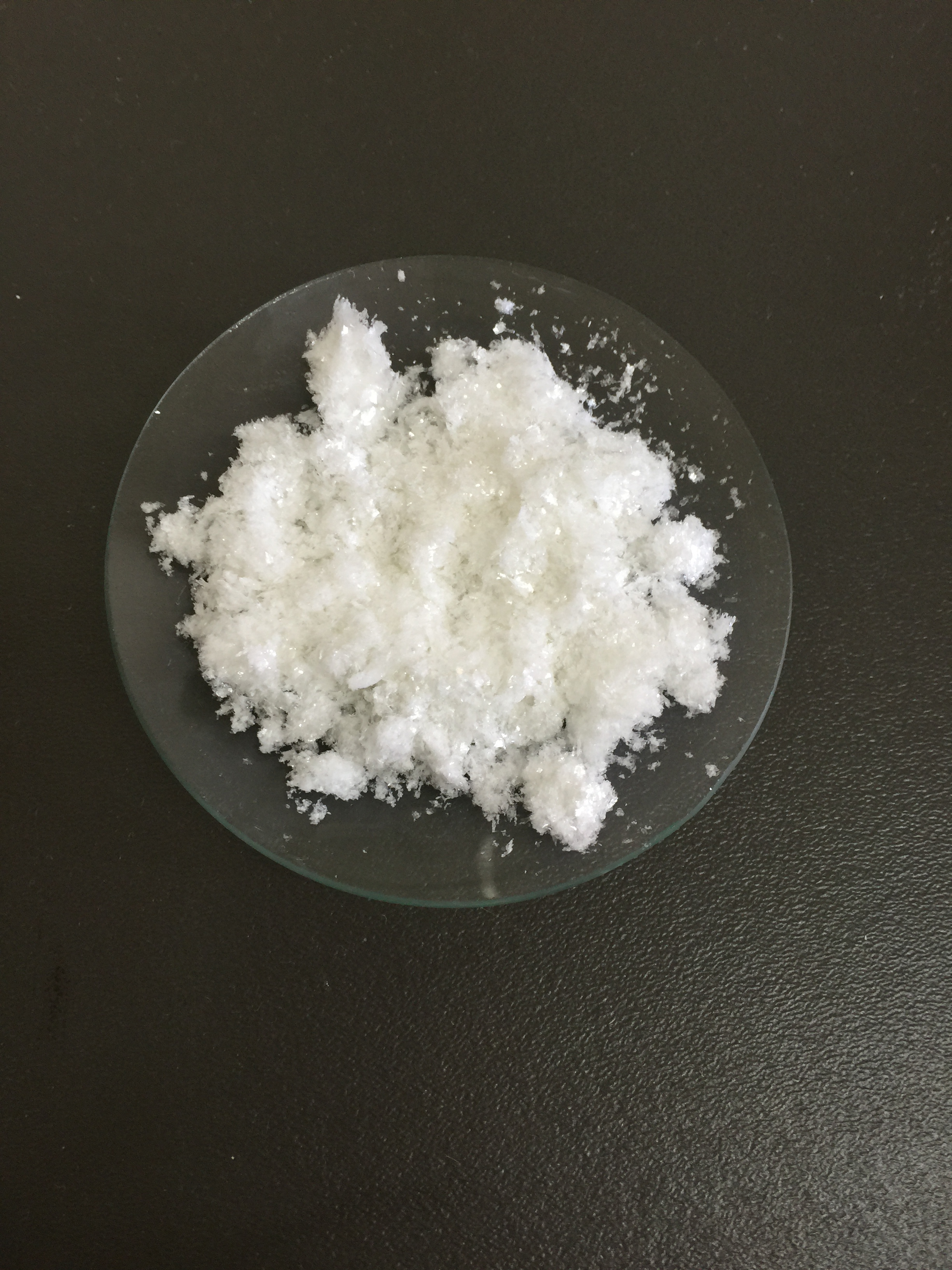
Acetanilide crystals on a watch glass

Acetanilide is the organic compound with the formula C_{6}H_{5}NHC(O)CH_{3}. It is the N-acetylated derivative of aniline. It is an odourless solid chemical of leaf or flake-like appearance. It is also known as N-phenylacetamide, acetanil, or acetanilid, and was formerly known by the trade name Antifebrin from Merck & Co. and Antikamnia from the Antikamnia Chemical Company.

== Preparation and properties ==
Acetanilide can be produced by reacting acetic anhydride with aniline:

C_{6}H_{5}NH_{2} + (CH_{3}CO)_{2}O → C_{6}H_{5}NHCOCH_{3} + CH_{3}COOH

The preparation used to be a traditional experiment in introductory organic chemistry lab classes, but it has now been widely replaced by the preparation of either paracetamol or aspirin, both of which teach the same practical techniques (especially recrystallization of the product) but which avoid the use of aniline, a suspected carcinogen.

Acetanilide is slightly soluble in water, and stable under most conditions. Pure crystals are plate shaped and appear colorless, white, or in between.

== Applications ==
Acetanilide is used as an inhibitor of hydrogen peroxide decomposition and is used to stabilize cellulose ester varnishes. It has also found uses in the intermediation in rubber accelerator synthesis, dyes and dye intermediate synthesis, and camphor synthesis. Acetanilide is used for the production of 4-acetamidobenzenesulfonyl chloride, a key intermediate for the manufacture of the sulfa drugs.

In the 19th century acetanilide was one of a large number of compounds used as experimental photographic developers.

In 1886, acetanilide was introduced into medical practice as a fever-reducing agent under the name Antifebrin. It was one of the first aniline derivatives found to possess analgesic and antipyretic properties. However, its use was later discontinued due to toxic side effects, including methemoglobinemia, which led to cyanosis.

The first patent regarding the utilization of acetanilide as an inhibitor of hydrogen peroxide decomposition was later filed in 1905.

Acetanilide-derived herbicides have been used since the 1960s or earlier. These include alachlor, metolachlor and xylachlor.

=== Pharmaceutical use ===
Acetanilide was the first aniline derivative found to possess analgesic as well as antipyretic properties, and was quickly introduced into medical practice under the names of Antifebrin by A. Cahn and P. Hepp in 1886. But its (apparent) unacceptable toxic effects, the most alarming being cyanosis due to methemoglobinemia and ultimately liver and kidney damage, prompted the search for supposedly less toxic aniline derivatives such as phenacetin. After several conflicting results over the ensuing fifty years, it was established in 1948 that acetanilide was mostly metabolized to paracetamol (acetaminophen) in the human body, and that it was this metabolite that was responsible for the analgesic and antipyretic properties. The observed methemoglobinemia after acetanilide administration was ascribed to the small proportion of acetanilide that is hydrolyzed to aniline in the body.

== See also ==
- Nitroacetanilide
