= List of Guggenheim Fellowships awarded in 1967 =

This is a list of Guggenheim Fellowships awarded in 1967. Two hundred and ninety-four scholars and artists were chosen and a total of $2,196,100 was disbursed. The University of California system had 40 awardees, with Berkeley claiming the most grants (20) of any single institution. Columbia University had the second most (15) and Harvard University and University of Illinois tied for third (14 each).

== US and Canada Fellows ==
Category	Field of Study	Fellow	Institutional association	Research topic	Notes	Ref
Creative Arts	Choreography	Yuriko Kikuchi	Martha Graham Dance Company	Choreography		
Creative Arts	Choreography	Alwin Nikolais	Nikolais Dance Theatre	Choreography	Also won in 1964	
Creative Arts	Drama & Performance Art	Charles J. Dizenzo				
Creative Arts	Drama & Performance Art	Adrienne Kennedy				
Creative Arts	Drama & Performance Art	Arthur Kopit				
Creative Arts	Fiction	Alfred Chester		Writing	Also won in 1957	
Creative Arts	Fiction	Maureen Howard		Writing		
Creative Arts	Fiction	Jerzy Kosinski		Work on his second novel (working title: The Twos)		
Creative Arts	Fiction	Alden Nowlan	Telegraph-Journal	Writing		
Creative Arts	Fiction	Joyce Carol Oates	University of Detroit	Writing		
Creative Arts	Fiction	Kurt Vonnegut	University of Iowa	Writing		
Creative Arts	Film	Jordan Belson		Samadhi		
Creative Arts	Film	James Blue		Script development for a film based on his family's history		
Creative Arts	Film	Robert J. Downey	Filmex	Filmmaking		
Creative Arts	Fine Arts	Roberto Alberty	El Morro Gallery	Painting		
Creative Arts	Fine Arts	Edward Avedisian		Painting		
Creative Arts	Fine Arts	George Bireline	North Carolina State University	Painting		
Creative Arts	Fine Arts	Frank Bowling		Painting	Also won in 1973	
Creative Arts	Fine Arts	James Brooks	Queens College, CUNY	Painting		
Creative Arts	Fine Arts	Sally Hazelet Drummond		Painting		
Creative Arts	Fine Arts	Patricia Tobacco Forrester		Painting: Landscapes of tropical continents		
Creative Arts	Fine Arts	Raoul Hague		Sculpture		
Creative Arts	Fine Arts	Allan Kaprow	SUNY Stony Brook	"The Happening as an Art Form Related to Contemporary Painting"	Also won in 1979	
Creative Arts	Fine Arts	Gabriel Kohn				
Creative Arts	Fine Arts	Nicholas Krushenick				
Creative Arts	Fine Arts	Dennis Leon	Philadelphia College of Art	Sculpture		
Creative Arts	Fine Arts	Guido Molinari		Painting		
Creative Arts	Fine Arts	Robert Moskowitz	Maryland Institute	Painting		
Creative Arts	Fine Arts	Walter T. Murch	Boston University			
Creative Arts	Fine Arts	Raymond Parker	Hunter College, CUNY	Painting	Also won in 1981	
Creative Arts	Fine Arts	Charles Pollock	Michigan State University	Painting		
Creative Arts	Fine Arts	Michael Ponce de Leon	University of Pennsylvania			
Creative Arts	Fine Arts	Ad Reinhardt	Brooklyn College	Painting		
Creative Arts	Fine Arts	Moishe Smith	University of Wisconsin, Madison (visiting)			
Creative Arts	Fine Arts	Harold Tovish				
Creative Arts	Fine Arts	Emerson Seville Woelffer	California Institute of the Arts			
Creative Arts	Fine Arts	Lawrence I. Zox		Painting		
Creative Arts	Music Composition	Philip Bezanson	University of Massachusetts	Composition		
Creative Arts	Music Composition	Ornette Coleman		Jazz composition (Inventions of Symphonic Poems)	Also won in 1974	
Creative Arts	Music Composition	Michael C. Colgrass		Theatrical concepts	Also won in 1964	
Creative Arts	Music Composition	George H. Crumb	University of Pennsylvania	Composition	Also won in 1973	
Creative Arts	Music Composition	Kenneth L. Gaburo	University of Illinois, Urbana	Composition		
Creative Arts	Music Composition	Emmanuel Ghent	New York University	Work at the Columbia Princeton Electronic Music Center		
Creative Arts	Music Composition	William Kraft	Los Angeles Philharmonic Orchestra	Composition	Also won in 1972	
Creative Arts	Music Composition	Donald Martino	Yale University	Composition	Also won in 1973, 1982	
Creative Arts	Music Composition	Edward Jay Miller	University of Hartford	Composition		
Creative Arts	Music Composition	Hall Overton		Composition	Also won in 1955	
Creative Arts	Music Composition	Richard Trythall	St. Stephen's School Rome	Composition		
Creative Arts	Photography	Marie Cosindas				
Creative Arts	Photography	George Krause			Also won in 1976	
Creative Arts	Photography	Rose Mandel	University of California, Berkeley	Photographic studies of Berkeley		
Creative Arts	Photography	Marion Palfi		Forced relocation of Indigenous peoples off of reservations in the Southwest United States		
Creative Arts	Photography	Jerry N. Uelsmann	University of Florida	"Experiments in Multiple Printing Techniques in Photography"		
Creative Arts	Poetry	John Ashbery			Also won in 1973	
Creative Arts	Poetry	Paul Blackburn	City University of New York (in residence)	Work on translations and poetry in Europe		
Creative Arts	Poetry	Thomas McGrath	North Dakota State University			
Humanities	American Literature	Wallace L. Anderson	State College of Iowa	Edition of the letters of Edwin Arlington Robinson		
Humanities	American Literature	Warner Berthoff	Bryn Mawr College			
Humanities	American Literature	Joseph L. Blotner	University of Virginia		Also won in 1964	
Humanities	American Literature	Theodore Hornberger	University of Pennsylvania			
Humanities	American Literature	Edwin H. Miller	New York University		Also won in 1977	
Humanities	American Literature	Claude M. Simpson Jr.	Stanford University			
Humanities	Architecture, Planning, & Design	Eric C. Freund	University of Illinois, Urbana			
Humanities	Architecture, Planning, & Design	Sibyl Moholy-Nagy	Pratt Institute	Reappraisal of architectural history		
Humanities	Architecture, Planning, & Design	Paolo Soleri		Arcology designs	Also won in 1964	
Humanities	Bibliography	David F. Foxon	Queen's University at Kingston	Scottish printers' ornaments, 1701-1750		
Humanities	Bibliography	David Kaser	Vanderbilt University	Book pirating and smuggling in the Orient		
Humanities	British History	H. Blair Neatby	Carleton University	Biography of W. L. Mackenzie King		
Humanities	British History	Donald J. Olsen	Vassar College	Management of two large British urban leasehold estates during the 19th century	Also won in 1979	
Humanities	British History	Bernard Semmel	SUNY Stony Brook	Relationship of Methodism to society in 18th-century England	Also won in 1974	
Humanities	British History	Arthur J. Slavin	University of California, Los Angeles			
Humanities	Classics	William A. McDonald	University of Minnesota	Human ecology of Messenia from the late Bronze age to the present	Also won in 1958	
Humanities	East Asian Studies	Albert M. Craig	Harvard University	Bureaucratic modernization in non-Western societies		
Humanities	Economic History	Craufurd D. W. Goodwin	Duke University	Impact of imperial and commonwealth relations upon the development of British political economy		
Humanities	English Literature	Kenneth Neill Cameron	New York University			
Humanities	English Literature	William B. Coley	Wesleyan University	The Complete Works of Henry Fielding		
Humanities	English Literature	David J. DeLaura	University of Texas, Austin	Matthew Arnold's humanism		
Humanities	English Literature	Madeleine Doran	University of Wisconsin, Madison			
Humanities	English Literature	Barbara Kiefer Lewalski	Brown University		Also won in 1980	
Humanities	English Literature	Leslie A. Marchand	Rutgers University	Lord Byron biography	Also won in 1979	
Humanities	English Literature	Steven Marcus	Columbia University			
Humanities	English Literature	William K. Rose	Vassar College	Ezra Pound and the literary revolution in London, 1908-1922		
Humanities	English Literature	Edward W. Rosenheim Jr.	University of Chicago			
Humanities	English Literature	Christopher Spencer	Illinois State University	New variorium edition of Merchant of Venice		
Humanities	English Literature	Wilfred H. Stone	Stanford University		Also won in 1957	
Humanities	English Literature	Earl Reeves Wasserman	Johns Hopkins University	Shelley's poetry and thought		
Humanities	English Literature	George Whalley	Queen's University at Kingston	Edition of the Marginalia of S. T. Coleridge		
Humanities	Film, Video and Radio Studies	Manny Farber			Also won in 1978	
Humanities	Fine Arts Research	Peter H. von Blanckenhagen	New York University Institute of Fine Arts			
Humanities	Fine Arts Research	Richard Brilliant	University of Pennsylvania	Studies in Rome		
Humanities	Fine Arts Research	José López-Rey	Smith College		Also won in 1947, 1960	
Humanities	Fine Arts Research	Theodore Reff	Columbia University		Also won in 1974	
Humanities	Fine Arts Research	Jakob Rosenberg	Harvard University	Renaissance and Baroque art in northern Europe		
Humanities	French History	J. Russell Major	Emory University	Crown and French provincial estates from 1600 through 1632	Also won in 1952	
Humanities	French Literature	Leo Bersani	Wellesley College	Psychological aspects of narrative techniques in French fiction		
Humanities	French Literature	Adrienne D. Hytier	Vassar College	Relations between French writers and the so-called "enlightened despots"		
Humanities	French Literature	Walter G. Langlois	University of Kentucky	Influence of Andre Malraux's political and moral concerns upon his writings after 1930		
Humanities	French Literature	Donald A. Stone Jr.	Harvard University	French drama, 1500-1630		
Humanities	French Literature	Philip D. Walker	University of California, Santa Barbara	Critical study of the fiction of Emile Zola		
Humanities	General Nonfiction	Benjamin DeMott	University of Massachusetts	Contemporary culture	Also won in 1963	
Humanities	General Nonfiction	Richard Kostelanetz	Columbia University			
Humanities	General Nonfiction	Ruthven Todd			Also won in 1959	
Humanities	German & East European History	Raymond Grew	University of Michigan, Ann Arbor			
Humanities	German & East European History	Arno J. Mayer	Princeton University	Europe between revolution and counter-revolution, 1870-1956		
Humanities	German & Scandinavian Literature	Ernst Behler	University of Washington		Also won in 1975	
Humanities	German & Scandinavian Literature	Richard Carl Exner	University of California, Santa Barbara	Essayistic prose of Hugo von Hofmannsthal		
Humanities	German & Scandinavian Literature	Eric O. Johannesson	University of California, Berkeley	Critical study of the modern Scandinavian novel		
Humanities	German & Scandinavian Literature	Henry H. H. Remak	Indiana University	Structure of the German novelle in the 19th century		
Humanities	History of Science and Technology	Robert Edwin Schofield	Case Institute of Technology	Development of British science	Also won in 1959	
Humanities	Iberian & Latin American History	James Ralston Scobie	Indiana University	Social history of Buenos Aires from 1870-1920		
Humanities	Latin American Literature	Wilson Martins	New York University			
Humanities	Linguistics	Herbert J. Landar	California State College, Los Angeles	European influence on American Indian linguistics		
Humanities	Linguistics	Leigh Lisker	University of Pennsylvania			
Humanities	Linguistics	Albert Valdman	Indiana University	Linguistic variations in urban standard French		
Humanities	Literary Criticism	Eric Bentley	University of Minnesota		Also won in 1948	
Humanities	Literary Criticism	Avrom Fleishman	Michigan State University	The English historical novel		
Humanities	Literary Criticism	Mark Spilka	Brown University			
Humanities	Literary Criticism	Ramón Xirau Subias	University of the Americas; Universidad Nacional Autónoma de México		Also won in 1972	
Humanities	Medieval History	Giles Constable	Harvard University	Monastic movements of the 11th and 12th centuries		
Humanities	Medieval Literature	W. T. H. Jackson	Columbia University		Also won in 1958	
Humanities	Medieval Literature	Ojars Kratins	University of California, Berkeley	Morphology and history of medieval Arthurian romance		
Humanities	Music Research	Charles Hamm	University of Illinois			
Humanities	Music Research	Daniel Heartz	University of California, Berkeley	An edition of Mozart's Idomeneo	Also won in 1978	
Humanities	Music Research	Frederick Neumann	University of Richmond		Also won in 1975	
Humanities	Music Research	Mary Helen Rasmussen				
Humanities	Near Eastern Studies	Joseph F. Schacht	Columbia University	History of Islamic theology		
Humanities	Near Eastern Studies	Moshe Zeltzer	University of Saskatchewan			
Humanities	Philosophy	Ernest W. Adams	University of California, Berkeley	Philosophical investigation of the fundamental concepts of geometry		
Humanities	Philosophy	Paul Benacerraf	Princeton University	Philosophical study of the foundations of logic and mathematics		
Humanities	Philosophy	Peter A. Bertocci	Boston University			
Humanities	Philosophy	Hector-Neri Castañeda	Wayne State University			
Humanities	Philosophy	Frederick A. Olafson	Harvard University	Rational explanation in history		
Humanities	Philosophy	Jerome B. Schneewind	University of Pittsburgh	History of moral thought in Victorian England		
Humanities	Religion	Ian G. Barbour	Carleton College	Logic of model in science and theology		
Humanities	Religion	Carl E. Braaten	Lutheran School of Theology at Chicago			
Humanities	Religion	James Moody Gustafson	Yale University Divinity School		Also won in 1959	
Humanities	Religion	Frank William Stringfellow		Relevance of Biblical theology and ethics to contemporary social issues		
Humanities	Religion	Paul M. van Buren	Temple University	Implications for theology of contemporary analytic 'language' philosophy		
Humanities	Renaissance History	Philip A. Stadter	University of North Carolina, Chapel Hill	Transmission and diffusion of classical Greek literature in 15th century Italy		
Humanities	Russian History	Paul H. Avrich	Queens College, CUNY			
Humanities	Slavic Literature	Robert Louis Jackson	Yale University			
Humanities	South Asian Studies	Hans H. A. Bielenstein	Columbia University			
Humanities	South Asian Studies	Theodore Friend III	SUNY Buffalo	Comparative history of Indonesia and the Philippines under Japanese rule		
Humanities	Spanish & Portuguese Literature	Frank P. Casa	Harvard University	Function of the king in 17th-century Spanish drama		
Humanities	Spanish & Portuguese Literature	Birutė Ciplijauskaitė	University of Wisconsin			
Humanities	Spanish & Portuguese Literature	Monroe Z. Hafter	University of Michigan, Ann Arbor			
Humanities	Spanish & Portuguese Literature	Josep M. Solá-Solé	Catholic University of America		Also won in 1974	
Humanities	Spanish & Portuguese Literature	Anthony Nicholas Zahareas	University of Pennsylvania			
Humanities	Theatre Arts	Malcolm Goldstein	Queens College, CUNY			
Humanities	U.S. History	Daniel H. Calhoun	University of California, Davis	"Changing intellectual level in American Society, 1750-1870"		
Humanities	U.S. History	Alexander DeConde	University of California, Santa Barbara		Also won in 1959	
Humanities	U.S. History	George M. Fredrickson	Northwestern University			
Humanities	U.S. History	Frank O. Gatell	University of California, Los Angeles			
Humanities	U.S. History	Robert V. Hine	University of California, Riverside		Also won in 1957	
Humanities	U.S. History	Robert Walter Johannsen	University of Illinois, Urbana			
Humanities	U.S. History	Leon F. Litwack	University of California, Berkeley	Negro in American society, 1862-1883		
Humanities	U.S. History	David S. Lovejoy	University of Wisconsin, Madison			
Humanities	U.S. History	James M. McPherson	Princeton University	Role of Northern white liberals in the evolution of attitudes towards the Negro, 1870-1910		
Humanities	U.S. History	Rodman W. Paul	California Institute of Technology	History of the Far West and Great Plains from the Civil War to World War I		
Humanities	U.S. History	Francis Paul Prucha	Marquette University			
Humanities	U.S. History	Moses Rischin	San Francisco State College			
Humanities	U.S. History	Kenneth M. Stampp	University of California, Berkeley	Interpretive history of the American sectional conflict, 1845-1865	Also won in 1952	
Humanities	U.S. History	John William Ward	Amherst College	Intellectual history of America	Also won in 1958	
Natural Sciences	Applied Mathematics	Howard K. Birnbaum	University of Illinois, Urbana			
Natural Sciences	Applied Mathematics	Jay L. Hirshfield	Yale University			
Natural Sciences	Applied Mathematics	William Nachbar	University of California, San Diego			
Natural Sciences	Applied Mathematics	Allen Compere Pipkin	Brown University			
Natural Sciences	Applied Mathematics	David B. Wittry	University of Southern California	Research at Cambridge University		
Natural Sciences	Applied Mathematics	Lotfi A. Zadeh	University of California, Berkeley	Abstraction and pattern classification based on the notion of uncertainty in the definition of a mathematical set		
Natural Sciences	Astronomy and Astrophysics	Hans R. Griem	University of Maryland	Broadening of spectrum lines in plasmas		
Natural Sciences	Astronomy and Astrophysics	Kip S. Thorne	California Institute of Technology	Relative astrophysics		
Natural Sciences	Chemistry	Leland C. Allen	Princeton University	Electronic structure theory for large molecules	Also won in 1966	
Natural Sciences	Chemistry	John E. Baldwin	University of Illinois, Urbana			
Natural Sciences	Chemistry	John O. Edwards	Brown University			
Natural Sciences	Chemistry	Richard C. Jarnagin	University of North Carolina	Electronic states in organic systems		
Natural Sciences	Chemistry	Seymour Katcoff	Brookhaven National Laboratory	Research at the Weizmann Institute of Science		
Natural Sciences	Chemistry	Thomas J. Katz	Columbia University			
Natural Sciences	Chemistry	Nelson J. Leonard	University of Illinois, Urbana		Also won in 1959	
Natural Sciences	Chemistry	Edward S. Lewis	Rice University			
Natural Sciences	Chemistry	Bruce R. McGarvey	Polytechnic Institute of Brooklyn	Research with Geoffrey Wilkinson		
Natural Sciences	Chemistry	John Overend	University of Minnesota	Vibrational anharmonicity in polyatomic molecules		
Natural Sciences	Chemistry	Fausto Arturo Ramirez	SUNY Stony Brook	Chemical interactions in sugar phosphate		
Natural Sciences	Chemistry	Herman G. Richey	Pennsylvania State University	Intermediate products and carbon-carbon bonding to biological systems		
Natural Sciences	Chemistry	Alan W. Searcy	University of California, Berkeley	Kinetics of high temperature sublimation reactions and gas-solid reactions		
Natural Sciences	Chemistry	Dietmar Seyferth	Massachusetts Institute of Technology			
Natural Sciences	Computer Science	Gerald Estrin	University of California, Los Angeles		Also won in 1962	
Natural Sciences	Computer Science	John Alan Robinson	Rice University			
Natural Sciences	Computer Science	William R. Spillers	Columbia University	"Use of examples in an adaptive structural design system"		
Natural Sciences	Computer Science	Stephen H. Unger	Columbia University	Advanced theoretical studies in electricity		
Natural Sciences	Earth Science	Iris Y. Borg	Lawrence Livermore National Laboratory	Mechanical slip and twinning in solids		
Natural Sciences	Earth Science	Porter M. Kier	Smithsonian Institution			
Natural Sciences	Earth Science	George W. Platzman	University of Chicago			
Natural Sciences	Engineering	Iain Finnie	University of California, Berkeley	Analytical and experimental studies of the fracture of brittle solids		
Natural Sciences	Engineering	Ferdinand Freudenstein	Columbia University		Also won in 1961	
Natural Sciences	Engineering	Gordon Stanley Kino	Stanford University			
Natural Sciences	Engineering	James Dickson Murray	University of Michigan			
Natural Sciences	Engineering	Lawrence Baylor Robinson	University of California, Los Angeles			
Natural Sciences	Engineering	Eraldus Scala	Cornell University	Fiber composites and refractory materials, with particular emphasis on thermal and micromechanics problems		
Natural Sciences	Engineering	Lawrence Talbot	University of California, Berkeley	Electrostatic probe response in the transition flow regime		
Natural Sciences	Mathematics	Louis de Branges	Purdue University	Invariant subspaces of linear transformation in Hilbert space		
Natural Sciences	Mathematics	Edward B. Curtis	Massachusetts Institute of Technology			
Natural Sciences	Mathematics	Irving E. Segal	Massachusetts Institute of Technology		Also won in 1946, 1951	
Natural Sciences	Mathematics	John T. Tate	Harvard University	Arithmetic algebraic geometry		
Natural Sciences	Mathematics	Harold Widom	Cornell University	Mathematical analysis of orthogonal polynomials and related topics	Also won in 1972	
Natural Sciences	Medicine & Health	Ian W. Monie	University of California			
Natural Sciences	Medicine & Health	A. Stone Freedberg	Harvard Medical School	Effects of thyroid and other hormonal alternations on atrial intercellular potentials and ionic movements		
Natural Sciences	Medicine & Health	Gilbert S. Gordan	University of California			
Natural Sciences	Molecular & Cellular Biology	Arthur I. Aronson	Purdue University	Problems of differentiation in the sea urchin		
Natural Sciences	Molecular & Cellular Biology	Kimball C. Atwood	University of Illinois			
Natural Sciences	Molecular & Cellular Biology	Robert Auerbach	University of Wisconsin			
Natural Sciences	Molecular & Cellular Biology	Allan J. Erslev	Jefferson Medical College			
Natural Sciences	Molecular & Cellular Biology	Seymour Fogel	Brooklyn College			
Natural Sciences	Molecular & Cellular Biology	Christopher S. Foote	University of California, Los Angeles			
Natural Sciences	Molecular & Cellular Biology	Heinz Fraenkel-Conrat	University of California, Berkeley	Biophysical and chemical studies on developing tobacco mosaic virus and on temperature sensitive mutants	Also won in 1963	
Natural Sciences	Molecular & Cellular Biology	Julian H. Gibbs	Brown University			
Natural Sciences	Molecular & Cellular Biology	Walter Gilbert	Harvard University	Genetic control mechanisms in bacteria and viruses		
Natural Sciences	Molecular & Cellular Biology	Irwin C. Gunsalus	University of Illinois		Also won in 1949, 1959	
Natural Sciences	Molecular & Cellular Biology	William R. Harvey	University of Massachusetts	Ionic movements in living systems		
Natural Sciences	Molecular & Cellular Biology	Vernon M. Ingram	Massachusetts Institute of Technology	Research at University College London		
Natural Sciences	Molecular & Cellular Biology	Lowell N. Lewis	University of California, Riverside			
Natural Sciences	Molecular & Cellular Biology	Vivian Moses	Lawrence Radiation Laboratory	Microbial genetics and control mechanisms		
Natural Sciences	Molecular & Cellular Biology	Frederick W. Munz	University of Oregon	Genetic basis for differences in pigments responsible for vision		
Natural Sciences	Molecular & Cellular Biology	Satyabrata Nandi	University of California, San Francisco	Experimental studies on mammary tumor virus activity in red blood cells of mice		
Natural Sciences	Molecular & Cellular Biology	Lee D. Peachey	University of Pennsylvania School of Medicine			
Natural Sciences	Molecular & Cellular Biology	Keith R. Porter	Harvard University	Cell fine structure		
Natural Sciences	Molecular & Cellular Biology	Frederic M. Richards	Yale University			
Natural Sciences	Molecular & Cellular Biology	Parithychery R. Srinivasan	Columbia University			
Natural Sciences	Molecular & Cellular Biology	Roger Y. Stanier	University of California, Berkeley	Procaryotic cell	Also won in 1945, 1951	
Natural Sciences	Molecular & Cellular Biology	Arthur Veis	Northwestern University			
Natural Sciences	Molecular & Cellular Biology	Irving Zabin	University of California, Los Angeles			
Natural Sciences	Neuroscience	Graham Hoyle	University of Oregon	Processes that link nerve impulse and muscular contraction		
Natural Sciences	Neuroscience	Richard Desmond O'Brien	Cornell University	Neurobiochemistry		
Natural Sciences	Neuroscience	James L. Larimer	University of Texas	Neurophysiology		
Natural Sciences	Organismic Biology & Ecology	George P. Georghiou	University of California, Riverside			
Natural Sciences	Organismic Biology & Ecology	Timothy H. Goldsmith	Yale University			
Natural Sciences	Organismic Biology & Ecology	Cadet Hammond Hand Jr.	University of California, Berkeley	Systematics of certain sea anemones and other coelenterates		
Natural Sciences	Organismic Biology & Ecology	Marcos Kogan	Oswaldo Cruz Foundation		Also won in 1964	
Natural Sciences	Organismic Biology & Ecology	Ralph J. Raitt	New Mexico State University	Coexistence of selected groups of certain species of thrushes in Costa Rica and Venezuela		
Natural Sciences	Organismic Biology & Ecology	Rodolfo Ruibal	University of California, Riverside			
Natural Sciences	Organismic Biology & Ecology	William N. Tavolga	City College, CUNY			
Natural Sciences	Physics	William R. Bennett, Jr.	Yale University			
Natural Sciences	Physics	Herman Y. Carr	Rutgers University	Theoretical studies of phase transitions and critical point phenomena		
Natural Sciences	Physics	Eugene D. Commins	University of California, Berkeley	Theory of weak interactions of elementary particles		
Natural Sciences	Physics	David L. Falkoff	Brandeis University			
Natural Sciences	Physics	Charles J. Goebel	University of Wisconsin			
Natural Sciences	Physics	Ernest Mark Henley	University of Washington			
Natural Sciences	Physics	Garth Jones	University of British Columbia	Experimental studies of meson atom reactions		
Natural Sciences	Physics	Martin J. Klein	Case Institute of Technology		Also won in 1958	
Natural Sciences	Physics	James S. Kouvel	General Electric Research & Development Center			
Natural Sciences	Physics	Robert E. Marshak	University of Rochester	Theoretical high energy physics	Also won in 1953, 1960	
Natural Sciences	Physics	Carl E. McIlwain	University of California, San Diego		Also won in 1971	
Natural Sciences	Physics	Sergio Rodríguez	Purdue University	Theoretical studies on the magnetic properties of solids		
Natural Sciences	Physics	John Silcox	Cornell University	Superconductivity and electron energy loss		
Natural Sciences	Physics	Sam Bard Treiman	Princeton University	Theoretical studies in elementary particle physics		
Natural Sciences	Physics	Charles T. Walker	Northwestern University			
Natural Sciences	Physics	James King Walker	Harvard University			
Natural Sciences	Plant Sciences	Walter D. Bonner Jr.	University of Pennsylvania			
Natural Sciences	Plant Sciences	Robert E. Cleland	University of Washington			
Natural Sciences	Plant Sciences	Rudolf M. Schuster	University of Massachusetts	Families and genera of Hepaticae	Also won in 1955	
Natural Sciences	Statistics	Arthur P. Dempster	Harvard University	Concepts and reasoning processes of statistical inference		
Natural Sciences	Statistics	Leonard J. Savage	Yale University		Also won in 1951, 1958	
Natural Sciences	Statistics	Milton Sobel	University of Minnesota	Application of information theory in areas of ranking problems and group testing		
Social Sciences	Anthropology & Cultural Studies	Edward P. Dozier	University of Arizona	Ecological effects on the social and cultural institutions of the Rio Grande Pueblo of eastern New Mexico		
Social Sciences	Anthropology & Cultural Studies	Henry B. Nicholson	University of California, Los Angeles			
Social Sciences	Anthropology & Cultural Studies	Marshall D. Sahlins	University of Michigan			
Social Sciences	Anthropology & Cultural Studies	Lauriston Sharp	Cornell University	Ritual, myth and symbolism in mainland Southeast Asia		
Social Sciences	Education	Richard C. Atkinson	Stanford University			
Social Sciences	Education	Carl Bereiter	University of Illinois			
Social Sciences	Education	Merle L. Borrowman	University of Wisconsin	What Doctrines Embrace: Historical Studies of Community and Education in America		
Social Sciences	Education	Christopher Jencks	Harvard University	Limits of schooling	Also won in 1982	
Social Sciences	Education	John D. Krumboltz	Stanford University			
Social Sciences	Economics	Carlos F. Díaz-Alejandro	University of Minnesota	Econometric studies of Latin American experience in industrialization		
Social Sciences	Economics	Irving B. Kravis	University of Pennsylvania			
Social Sciences	Economics	Ben B. Seligman	University of Massachusetts	Problems of poverty in the United States		
Social Sciences	Geography & Environmental Studies	Dan Stanislawski	University of Arizona	History and spread of the wine vine in Mediterranean Europe	Also won in 1952	
Social Sciences	Geography & Environmental Studies	Yi-Fu Tuan	University of Toronto	Dry-land studies		
Social Sciences	Law	David T. Bazelon	Rutgers University	Role of law and lawyers in the American system		
Social Sciences	Law	Richard J. Schoeck	University of Toronto	Historical studies of Tudor England		
Social Sciences	Political Science	Thomas J. Anton	University of Illinois, Chicago	Decision-making in suburban development in Sweden and the United States		
Social Sciences	Political Science	David E. Apter	University of California, Berkeley	Structural theory of politics		
Social Sciences	Political Science	John A. Armstrong Jr.	University of Wisconsin		Also won in 1975	
Social Sciences	Political Science	Morris Davis	University of Illinois			
Social Sciences	Political Science	James G. Eayrs	University of Toronto	Canada's external and national security policies		
Social Sciences	Political Science	Maurice Marks Goldsmith	Columbia University			
Social Sciences	Political Science	Theodore J. Lowi	University of Chicago			
Social Sciences	Political Science	Roger D. Masters	Yale University			
Social Sciences	Political Science	Joseph Rothschild	Columbia University			
Social Sciences	Political Science	Donald S. Zagoria	Columbia College			
Social Sciences	Psychology	Frank X. Barron	University of California, Berkeley	Effect of different cultures on creativity and life goals		
Social Sciences	Psychology	Martin E. Fishbein	University of Illinois			
Social Sciences	Psychology	Kenneth J. Gergen	Harvard University	Benefice as an instrument of international policy		
Social Sciences	Psychology	Thomas F. Pettigrew	Harvard University	Consequences of varying racial compositions in public schools		
Social Sciences	Psychology	Stanley Schachter	Columbia University			
Social Sciences	Psychology	Muzafer Sherif	Pennsylvania State University	Problems of group psychology and attitude change; development of study on the theoretical and methodological problems of social psychology		
Social Sciences	Sociology	Corinne Lathrop Gilb	San Francisco State College			
Social Sciences	Sociology	David Matza	University of California, Berkeley	Prohibition and proscription of deviance		

== Latin and Caribbean Fellows ==
Category	Field of Study	Fellow	Institutional association	Research topic	Notes	Ref
Creative Arts	Fiction	Héctor Alvarez Murena			Also won in 1972	
Creative Arts	Fiction	Vicente Leñero Otero				
Creative Arts	Fine Arts	Amilcar de Castro		Sculpture	Also won in 1969	
Creative Arts	Fine Arts	Vlady Kibalchich Rusakov		Painting		
Creative Arts	Fine Arts	Alejandro Puente				
Creative Arts	Musical Composition	Edgar Valcárcel		Composing	Also won in 1965	
Creative Arts	Poetry	Marco Antonio Montes de Oca	Universidad Nacional Autónoma de México		Also won in 1971	
Creative Arts	Poetry	Tomás Segovia	Colegio de México		Also won in 1975	
Humanities	Latin American Literature	Alexandre Eulálio P Cunha	Harvard University			
Humanities	Philosophy	Ezequiel de Olaso				
Humanities	Theatre Arts	Héctor Azar	Instituto Nacional de Bellas Artes			
Natural Sciences	Earth Science	Fernando Cervigón Marcos	Fundación La Salle			
Natural Sciences	Earth Science	Carlos María Urien	University of Buenos Aires	Oceanographic studies		
Natural Sciences	Mathematics	Pedro Nowosad	Federal University of Rio Grande do Sul	Research at Stanford University		
Natural Sciences	Medicine and Health	Oscar Brunser Tesarschü	University of Chile		Also won in 1965	
Natural Sciences	Medicine and Health	Guillermo Contreras	University of Chile	Research at the Albert Einstein College of Medicine		
Natural Sciences	Medicine and Health	Dalmo de Souza Amorim	Universidade de São Paulo			
Natural Sciences	Molecular and Cellular Biology	Carlos Gitler Rechtman	Instituto Politécnico Nacional			
Natural Sciences	Organismic Biology & Ecology	Tagea Björnberg	Universidade de São Paulo			
Natural Sciences	Physics	Roberto I. M. G. Forneris	University of São Paulo			
Natural Sciences	Plant Science	Luis Sigifredo Espinal T.	University of Valle			
Social Sciences	Anthropology & Cultural Studies	Víctor A. Núñez Regueiro	Universidad Nacional de Córdoba			
Social Sciences	Anthropology & Cultural Studies	Alberto Rex González	National University of La Plata, National University of the Littoral		Also won in 1956, 1966	
Social Sciences	Psychology	Antonio M. Battro	International Centre of Genetic Epistemology	Research at New York Medical College		
Social Sciences	Sociology	Rémy Bastien	Centro Interamericano de Vivienda y Planeamiento			

== See also ==
- Guggenheim Fellowship
- List of Guggenheim Fellowships awarded in 1966
- List of Guggenheim Fellowships awarded in 1968
