= History of Princeton University =

Princeton University was founded in Elizabeth, New Jersey, in 1746 as the College of New Jersey, shortly before moving into the newly built Nassau Hall in Princeton. In 1783, for about four months Nassau Hall hosted the United States Congress, and many of the students went on to become leaders of the young republic.

The institution was formally designated Princeton University in 1896, and soon embarked on a major expansion under the auspices of future president of the USA Woodrow Wilson. Later in the 20th century, the culture became more liberal, and Princeton became coeducational in 1969.

== College of New Jersey ==
Princeton University was founded at Elizabeth, New Jersey, in 1746 as the College of New Jersey.

New Light Presbyterians founded the College of New Jersey, later Princeton University, in 1746 in order to train ministers dedicated to their views. The college was the educational and religious capital of Scottish-Irish America. By 1808, a loss of confidence in the college within the Presbyterian Church led to the establishment in 1812 of the separate Princeton Theological Seminary, but deep Presbyterian influence at the college continued through the 1910s. The Province of New Jersey granted a charter on October 22, 1746 for “the Education of Youth in the Learned Languages and in the Liberal Arts and Sciences”. The charter was unique in the colonies, for it specified that “any Person of any religious Denomination whatsoever” might attend. The College's enrollment totaled 10 young men, who met for classes in the Reverend Jonathan Dickinson's parlor in Elizabeth. Dickinson died soon after and was replaced by Aaron Burr Sr., pastor of the Presbyterian Church in Newark, New Jersey. The College moved to Newark in the fall of 1747, where in 1748 a class of six men became the first to graduate.

== New location ==
In 1756, the College moved to its new quarters to Nassau Hall, in Princeton, New Jersey. Nassau Hall, named to honor King William III, Prince of Orange, of the House of Nassau, was one of the largest buildings in the colonies. For nearly half a century it housed the entire College—classrooms, dormitories, library, chapel, dining room, and kitchen. During the American Revolution it survived occupation by soldiers from both sides and today bears a cannonball scar from the Battle of Princeton (January 3, 1777). The federal government recognized the historical significance of “Old Nassau” by awarding it national landmark status and by issuing an orange and black commemorative three-cent stamp in celebration of its 1956 bicentennial.

Following the untimely deaths of its first five presidents, the college enjoyed a long period of stability during 1768-94 under the Reverend John Witherspoon. Military occupation and the Battle of Princeton severely damaged the college during the war. In another disaster, fire destroyed Nassau Hall in March 1802. Student unrest led to an explosion at the Nassau Hall front door and several other incidents in 1814. Witherspoon was a prominent religious and political leader; and an original signer of the Declaration of independence and the Articles of Confederation.

John Witherspoon was a prominent evangelical Presbyterian minister in Scotland before becoming the sixth president of Princeton in 1768. Upon his arrival, he transformed a college designed predominantly to train clergymen into a school that would equip the leaders of a revolutionary generation. Witherspoon made fundamental changes to the moral philosophy curriculum, strengthened the college's commitment to natural philosophy (science), and positioned Princeton in the larger transatlantic world of the republic of letters. Witherspoon's common sense approach to morality was more influenced by the Enlightenment ethics of Scottish philosophers Francis Hutcheson and Thomas Reid than the Christian virtue of Jonathan Edwards. Witherspoon thus believed morality was a science. It could be cultivated in his students or deduced through the development of the moral sense—an ethical compass instilled by God in all human beings and developed through education (Reid) or sociability (Hutcheson). Such an approach to morality owed more to the natural moral laws of the Enlightenment than traditional sources of Christian ethics. Thus, while "public religion" was an important source of social virtue, it was not the only source. Witherspoon, in accordance with the Scottish moral sense philosophy, taught that all human beings—religious or otherwise—could be virtuous. His students, who included James Madison, Aaron Burr, Philip Freneau, and John Breckinridge, all played prominent roles in the development of the new nation. Locally, Witherspoon was influential in leading the royal colony of New Jersey—a colony initially ambivalent about revolution—toward rebellion. In 1780 an amended charter declared that the trustees should no longer swear allegiance to the king of England, and in 1783 the Continental Congress met in Nassau Hall, thus making it the capitol of the United States for a short time. Nine Princeton alumni attended the Constitutional Convention of 1787, more than from any other American or British institution. But even as Witherspoon championed American liberty, he also championed more conservative ideals such as order and national unity. As a result, he was a strong defender of a national constitution. Not surprisingly, the College's revised charter of 1799 called on the trustees to support the new Constitution of the United States of America.

=== 19th century ===
The situation during the winter semester of 1806-07 under the presidency of Samuel Stanhope Smith was characterized by little or no faculty-student rapport or communication, crowded conditions, and strict school rules - a combination that led to a student riot on March 31-April 1, 1807. College authorities denounced it as a sign of moral decay.

In 1812 Princeton Theological Seminary was established as a separate institution. College authorities approved, for they were coming to see that specialized training in theology required more attention than they could give. Archibald Alexander, a professor at the college, was its first professor and principal. The two institutions have always enjoyed a close relationship based on common history and shared resources.

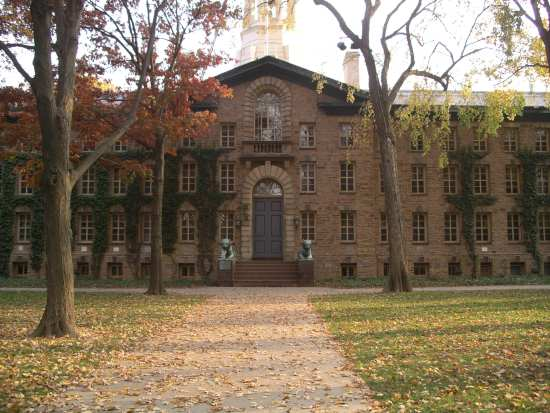
Nassau Hall, the university's oldest building.

Princeton University's position on pre-Civil War disputes over slavery and abolitionism tended to fall on the conservative side, not so much favoring slavery as opposing radical antislavery. This resulted from Princeton's adhering to the conservative Old School wing of the Presbyterian denomination. Ironically, the surrounding town had a lively free black community during this period, which formed its own congregations, including the Witherspoon Street Presbyterian Church. By the late 1850s, the conservative middle gave way and increasingly supported Lincoln and Republican Party positions on slavery issues.

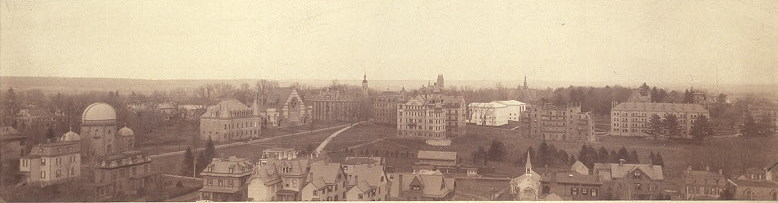
A Panoramic View Princeton's Campus c1895

The debate between James McCosh (1811–94), president of the college (1868–88), and Charles Hodge, head of Princeton Seminary, during the late 1860s and 1870s exemplified the classic conflict between science and religion over the question of Darwin's evolution theory. McCosh offered the first public endorsement of evolution by an American religious leader. However, the two men showed greater similarities regarding matters of science and religion than popularly appreciated. Both supported the increasing role of scientific inquiry in natural history and resisted its intrusion into philosophy and religion. The debate vitalized the college and helped propel the school to future recognition for excellence in scholarship.

Although genuinely loved by many Princetonians, as president of Princeton during 1888-1902 Francis Landey Patton (1843–1932) was viewed by many as a hindrance to Princeton's progress. His model of higher education frustrated the plans of the 'New Princetonians,' who desired a graduate school, not a graduate department. Further, his insistence on a somewhat rigid Christian education program - which limited academic freedom - coupled with outdated administrative methods, alienated those who hoped he would make Princeton into a major American university. Finally, in 1902, Patton was ousted from the presidency.

== Princeton University ==
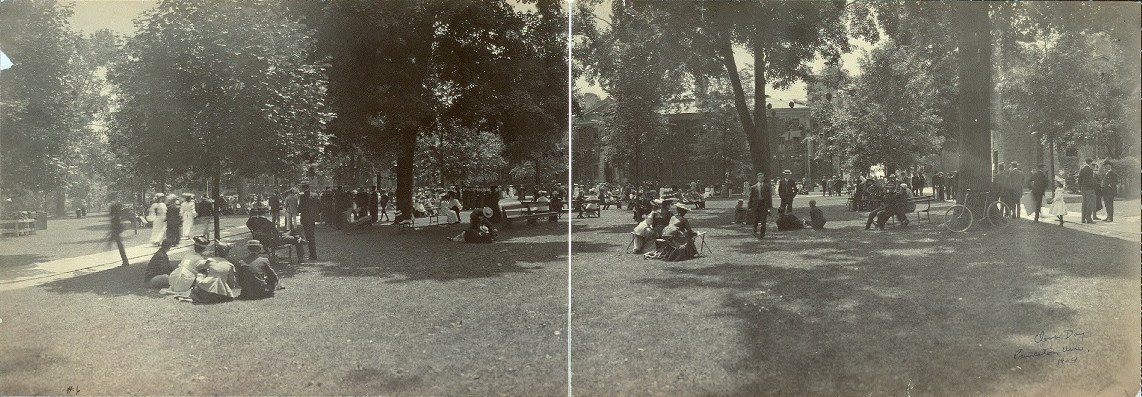
Princeton University Class Day c. 1904

As part of the sesquicentennial celebrations in 1896, the College of New Jersey changed its name to Princeton University, the present name of the university. Princeton University adopted as an informal motto “Princeton in the nation’s service,” the title of the keynote speech by professor Woodrow Wilson.

=== Woodrow Wilson ===
In 1902, Woodrow Wilson became Princeton's 13th president. During his term of office (1902–10) plans for building the Graduate College were finalized, and what had been the College of New Jersey began to grow into a full-scale university.

As Princeton looked toward expansion, Wilson focused on the quality of the individual teaching and learning experience. He is credited with developing small discussion classes called preceptorials, which to this day supplement lecture courses in the humanities and social sciences.

Wilson doubled the size of the faculty, created an administrative structure, and revised the curriculum to include general studies for freshmen and sophomores and concentrated study for juniors and seniors. He proposed that the undergraduate dormitories be divided into quadrangles or “colleges” in which students would live with resident faculty masters and have their own recreational facilities. A variation on this plan became a reality in 1982 when five residential colleges were organized for freshmen and sophomores.

Wilson kept blacks out of Princeton, even as other ivy-league schools were accepting small numbers of blacks and Princeton did not have its first black graduate until 1948.

Wilson established academic departments but otherwise downplayed the Germanic model of the PhD-oriented research university in favor of the "Oxbridge" (Oxford and Cambridge) model of intense small group discussions and one-on-one tutorials. He hired 50 young professors, called preceptors, to meet with students in small conferences, grilling them about their reading. Complaining that Princeton was dominated by "eating clubs" in which students ate with each other and ignored the professors, he sought to build Oxford-style colleges where students and faculty would eat and talk together. He failed—the eating clubs are still there.

Wilson promoted the leadership model, whereby the college focused on training a small cadre of undergraduates for national leadership, "the minority who plan, who conceive, who superintend," as he called them in his 1902 inaugural address as the university's president. "The college is no less democratic because it is for those who play a special part." He confronted Andrew Fleming West, the dean of the graduate school, and lost. West had the German research model in mind and outmaneuvered Wilson by obtaining outside funding for a graduate complex for serious scholarship that was well separated from the fun-loving undergraduates.

As supervising architect of the Princeton campus during 1906–29, Ralph Adams Cram contributed several important buildings in the medieval collegiate Gothic style as well as a plan for stylistic unity and for development.

=== Undergraduate life ===
The college was a popular setting for novels about student life, the faculty and the town. The "Undergraduate novel" (e.g., F. Scott Fitzgerald's This Side of Paradise and Harvey Smith's The Gang's All Here) detailed campus life in the 1920s and 1950s. The "Faculty novel" characterized the 1960s (e.g., Kingsley Amis's One Fat Englishman and John W. Aldridge's The Party at Cranton). The '"Town novel" (e.g., Julian Moynihan's Garden State and Thomas Baird's Losing People) typified the 1970s. Other important novels include Saul Bellow's Humboldt's Gift (1975) and Carlos Baker's A Friend's Power (1958).

As a trendsetter in young men's fashion, Princeton University in the early 20th century casualized the look of clothing across the country for decades to come. With its elite prep-school student population and highly ritualized eating club subculture, the school was an ideal setting in which to create a nation's taste in menswear.

In 1909–10, football faced a crisis resulting from the failure of the previous reforms of 1905–06 to solve the problem of serious injuries. There was a mood of alarm and mistrust, and, while the crisis was developing, the presidents of Harvard, Yale, and Princeton developed a project to reform the sport and forestall possible radical changes forced by government upon the sport. President Arthur Hadley of Yale, A. Lawrence Lowell of Harvard, and Wilson of Princeton worked to develop moderate changes to reduce injuries. Their attempts, however, were reduced by rebellion against the rules committee and formation of the Intercollegiate Athletic Association. The big three had tried to operate independently of the majority, but changes did reduce injuries. In 1926 Harvard entered into an agreement to play football against the University of Michigan instead of Princeton, and that agreement threatened to destroy the 'Big Three' relationship of the time. Harvard's actions were based on the fact that games with Princeton had been marred by fights and roughness. During the 1930s, the 'Big Three' was restored, and in 1939 it was enlarged to the Ivy League.

During World War II the student body of Princeton University became almost entirely military as the result of Reserve Officer Training Corps mobilization, the Navy V-7 and V-12 programs, and the Army Specialized Training Program. Wartime changes opened Princeton to the larger world and brought it into the mainstream of American society. From their beginnings Harvard, Yale and Princeton restricted the admittance of Jews and other minorities. After World War II, however, ethnic prejudice was condemned in higher education because of the US commitment to democracy. College-bound veterans, benefiting from the GI Bill, flooded admissions offices with applications. By the 1950s and 1960s the Big Three began to expand their admission policies, admitting more minorities.

=== Religion ===
In the early 20th century, the student body was predominately old-stock, high-status Protestants, especially Presbyterians, Episcopalians, and Congregationalists—a group later called "WASPS" (White Anglo-Saxon Protestants).

In the early 20th century liberal Christians came to dominate the student body, a former evangelical stronghold. In 1915 President John Grier Hibben refused the request of evangelist Billy Sunday to preach on campus, but later allowed liberal theologian Albert Parker Fitch to do so. Liberals sought to make Princeton a modern university that promoted a liberal philosophy of education and liberal theology. Conservative Christians considered the teachings of the liberals to be heresy and sought to get Lucius H. Miller, the liberal professor of Bible studies, removed from the faculty and to have Bible classes eliminated from the curriculum. Liberals favored retaining the religious aspects of the curriculum and, since they came to control Princeton, they were able to maintain those courses along with various institutions that promoted liberal piety. They did this through an uneasy alliance with cultural modernists on the faculty. Gradually the hegemony of the liberal Christian leaders of higher education was eroded by the secularization of the university that occurred during the first half of the 20th century. Princeton thus ceased being a Presbyterian institution in the 1920s, as symbolized by the building of a great interdenominational chapel.

=== Mathematics ===
American mathematicians of the 1920s worked to maintain the generous funding they had received during World War I. Unwilling to enter a permanent relationship with the federal government, they turned to industry and to private foundations, but with only limited success. The most reliable support for mathematics emerged from universities, where the funding could be justified as part of a larger program of institutional improvement. Oswald Veblen, a leading mathematician and chair of the department, took this approach as Princeton was in the process of transforming itself into a recognized research institution. Veblen's skill in securing university funding helped to make the Princeton mathematics department a center of mathematics research. His strategy helped to split the field, however, between 'pure' mathematicians in academic settings and 'applied' mathematicians whose interest in the practical applications of their work allowed them to find support in industry.

== 1960s and 1970s ==
Princeton was hardly untouched by the Vietnam War. Students for a Democratic Society (SDS) had an active Princeton chapter, which organized protests against the Institute for Defense Analysis and staged a protest that came to be known as the "Hickel Heckle," in which several SDS members demanded that Interior Secretary Walter J. Hickel "Talk About the War!" Three students were suspended over the incident.

In 1971, the Third World Center, now the Carl A. Fields Center, was founded to address the concerns of minority students to have a facility of their own making for academic, political and social functions.

== 1980s and 1990s ==
In 1982, the residential college system was officially established under Goheen's successor William G. Bowen, who would serve until 1988. During his presidency, Princeton's endowment increased from $625 million to $2 billion, and a major fundraising drive known as "A Campaign for Princeton" was conducted. President Harold T. Shapiro would succeed Bowen and remain president until 2001. Shapiro would continue to increase the endowment, expand academic programs, raise student diversity, and oversaw the most renovations in Princeton's history.

In 1987, Toni Morrison became the first Black woman writer to hold a named chair at an Ivy League university (Robert F. Goheen Professor in the Council of Humanities).

== 2000 to present ==
In 2001, Princeton elected its first female president, Shirley M. Tilghman. Before retiring in 2012, Tilghman expanded financial aid offerings and conducted several major construction projects.

Princeton's 20th and current president Christopher Eisgruber was elected in 2013. In 2017, Princeton University unveiled a large-scale public history and digital humanities investigation into its historical involvement with slavery called the Princeton & Slavery Project. The project saw the publication of hundreds of primary sources, 80 scholarly essays, a scholarly conference, a series of short plays, and an art project. In April 2018, university trustees announced that they would name two public spaces for James Collins Johnson and Betsey Stockton, enslaved people who lived and worked on Princeton's campus and whose stories were publicized by the project.

== Student activism post 2000 ==
After the 1970s, student activism at Princeton entered the mainstream again twice. In 2015, the Black Justice League, a student group, staged large-scale sit-ins at Nassau Hall. The protests were covered by the New York Times and led to the renaming of the Princeton School of Public and International Affairs in 2020. In 2019, mainstream media covered student sit-ins and social media activism concerning Princeton's implementation of federal Title IX policy relating to Campus sexual assault. The activism responded to a student's disciplinary sentence, which was widely interpreted as retaliatory.

== In service to the nation ==
Three future U.S. presidents studied at Princeton as undergraduates. Two were alumni: James Madison, the fourth president and an influential founding father, graduated in 1771; and Woodrow Wilson, the 28th president, graduated in 1879. Wilson also served as president of Princeton from 1902 to 1910. Future President John F. Kennedy began his studies at Princeton in the fall of 1935 until a period of illness precipitated his withdrawal from the university and eventual transfer to Harvard University during his freshman year.

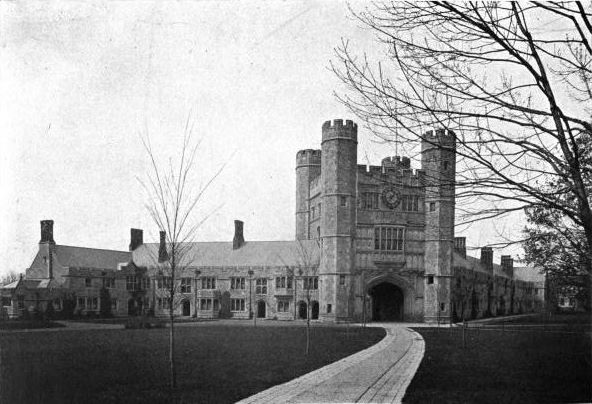
Blair Hall c1907

Princeton University has produced 29 Nobel laureates. Some of the greatest minds of 20th century were associated with Princeton University. Princeton has also produced several Fields Medallists. Before World War II, most elite university faculties were gentlemen's clubs, with few, if any, Jews, blacks, women, or other minorities. By 1980, this condition had been altered dramatically, as numerous members of those groups held faculty positions.

Princeton's students and faculty share the tradition of educational excellence begun more than 250 years ago. The few books in the Dickinson parlor were the seeds for 55 miles (89 km) of shelving and more than five million volumes in Firestone Library. The original quadrangle—Nassau Hall, the president's house, and two flanking halls—has grown into a 600-acre (2.4 km^{2}) main campus with more than 160 buildings. The “learned languages”—Latin and Greek—have been joined by many ancient and modern languages and an array of computer dialects.

Today, more than 1,200 full and part-time faculty members teach at Princeton; collectively they publish more than 2,000 scholarly documents a year. Princeton's professors form a single faculty that teaches both undergraduate and graduate students. Originally an institution devoted to the education of young men, Princeton became coeducational in 1969. Today, approximately 5,000 undergraduates and 2,500 graduate students are enrolled here. Virtually all undergraduates and about two-thirds of graduate students live on campus.

Princeton is one of the smallest of the nation's leading research universities. Its size permits close interaction among students and faculty members in settings ranging from introductory courses to senior theses.

== See also ==
- Princeton University
- President of Princeton University
