= Mary Rasmussen =

Mary Rasmussen may refer to:

- Mary Helen Rasmussen (1930–2008), American musicologist, writer, and editor
- Mary Rasmussen (politician), British politician
