= National Symphony Orchestra (Peru) =

National Symphony Orchestra (OSN)
- Orchestra
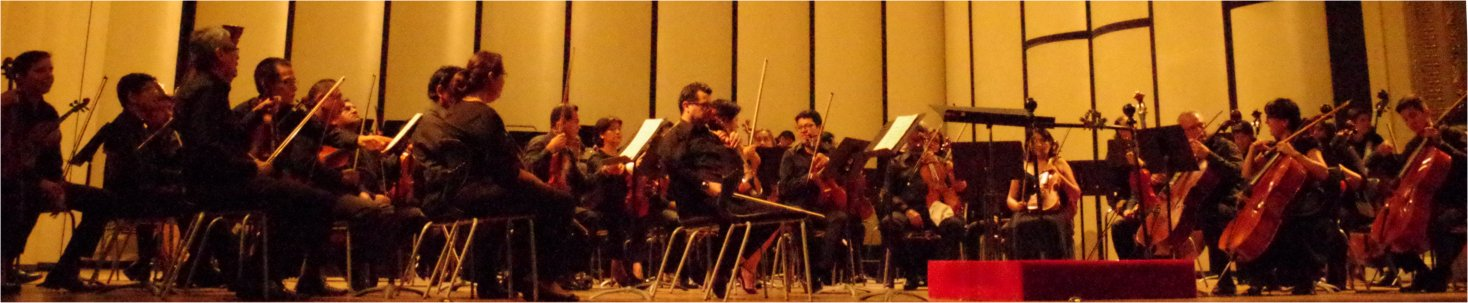
- National Symphony Orchestra in 2018
- Founded: 1938
- Location: Lima, Peru
- Principal conductor: Fernando Valcárcel
- Website: inc.perucultural.org.pe/el.shtml

The National Symphony Orchestra (Spanish: Orquesta Sinfónica Nacional), abbreviated OSN, is the state symphony orchestra of Peru; it is located in Lima. It is one of the components of the Peruvian Ministerio de Cultura. As of 2007, the orchestra had ninety members. Besides the traditional classical repertoire, the orchestra also performs Latin American and Peruvian works, including numerous world premieres.

== History ==
Before the formation of the National Symphony Orchestra, there was an amateur symphony orchestra, founded in 1907 under the auspices of the Lima Philharmonic Society (Sociedad Filarmónica de Lima). The National Symphony Orchestra was founded during the administration of Óscar R. Benavides by law of 11 August 1938. It initially consisted of sixty-four musicians, half of them native Peruvians, the other half foreigners then living in Peru or hired by contract from abroad. The orchestra gave its first concert on 11 December 1938 at the Teatro Municipal de Lima, under the baton of Theo Buchwald, as part of the eighth International Conference of American States. The program featured the National Anthem of Peru, plus works by Beethoven, Debussy, Manuel de Falla, Ravel, and Wagner.

The first director of the orchestra was the viennese conductor Theo Buchwald, who remained in that position until his death in 1960. This epoch of the orchestra's existence is considered its most brilliant period, since the orchestra had among her members many talented musicians who had come from Europe to Peru when fleeing the Second World War, among them many Jews . Visiting conductors who led the orchestra included Fritz Busch, Carlos Chávez, Aaron Copland, Antal Doráti, Erich Kleiber, Igor Markevitch, Malcolm Sargent, Hermann Scherchen, and Igor Stravinsky. Visiting soloists who performed with the orchestra included Claudio Arrau, Yehudi Menuhin, Artur Rubinstein, Andrés Segovia and Nicanor Zabaleta. A period of decline began in the 1960s, due in part to the socio-economic problems of Peru and to government cultural policies. The orchestra is now passing through a period of financial crisis and managerial reorganization that has engendered much controversy, partly over the transfer of the management of the orchestra to the National Association of Musical Performing Arts Organizations (Asociación Nacional de Elencos Musicales). In August 2006, angered that they would not be paid for a performance of Mozart's Requiem with the National Chorus (Peru) (Coro Nacional), the union of musicians of the orchestra refused to play, and a substitute orchestra was hurriedly assembled instead.

The orchestra has long promoted the work of Peruvian composers, and it has performed works by Daniel Alomía Robles, Celso Garrido-Lecca, Roberto Carpio, Enrique Iturriaga, Armando Guevara Ochoa, Ernesto López Mindreau, Enrique Pinilla, Francisco Pulgar Vidal, Alfonso de Silva, Teodoro Valcárcel and Edgar Valcárcel, among others.

== Locations ==
The orchestra's home for many years was the Teatro Municipal de Lima. The orchestra currently performs at the Gran Teatro Nacional, but it also gives educational concerts elsewhere in Lima and throughout Peru.

== Music Directors ==
- Theo Buchwald (1938–1960)
- Hans Günter Mommer (1960–1963)
- Armando Sánchez Málaga (1963—1965)
- Luis Herrera de la Fuente (1965—1967)
- Carmen Moral (on two separate occasions; the first woman to be a music director of an orchestra in Latin America; she has been named "Conductor Emeritus" of the orchestra)
- Leopoldo La Rosa
- José Malsio
- José Carlos Santos (1980—1983 and 1990—2001)
- Guillermina Maggiolo (September 2006–July 2009)
- Matteo Pagliari (since July 2009; incumbent)

== Bibliography ==
- Luis Antonio Meza Casas, "Música Académica", Enciclopedia Temática del Perú, vol. 16 (Lima: El Comercio S.A.) ISBN 978-9972-752-16-2
