= Josh Katz (disambiguation) =

Josh or Joshua Katz may refer to:

- Josh Katz, Australian Olympic judoka
- Joshua Katz, American classicist
