= Black Justice League =

Student organization at Princeton University

The Black Justice League was a student organization representing black students at Princeton University. It was active from 2014 to 2016.

== History ==
The Black Justice League (BJL) was a student organization founded by 15 students in September 2014 initially to protest the killing of Michael Brown, and later to bring elements of the Black Lives Matter movement to Princeton University.

Beginning in September 2015, the BJL began to focus on the legacy of former U.S. President Woodrow Wilson, traditionally a much-loved figure at Princeton, according to the New York Times. BJL distributed posters around campus highlighting Wilson's views on race and called on the school to distance itself from Wilson.

In November 2015, the group staged a walkout of approximately 200 students toward Nassau Hall and held a 32-hour sit-in in the office of Princeton University president Christopher Eisgruber in protest over what they saw as racial injustice and university inaction. The BJL presented a list of demands, including renaming the Woodrow Wilson School of Public and International Affairs, mandatory cultural competency training for staff, instituting academic requirements on racial identity, and affinity spaces for black students. About 30 students remained in Eisgruber's office into the night. Eisgruber refused to sign on to the demands. The BJL's protests were part of a string of similar occurrences across college campuses in the United States, including Georgetown University.

A new student group called the Princeton Open Campus Coalition formed to opposed the BJL's methods and demands.

After the sit-in, Princeton's board of trustees appointed the Wilson Legacy Review Committee to consider how the university should recognize Wilson. In April 2016, Princeton's board of trustees voted to keep Wilson's name of campus buildings and programs. Wilson's name was eventually removed from Wilson College and the School of Public and International Affairs in the wake of the George Floyd protests.

== Later developments ==
On July 8, 2020, Princeton professor Joshua Katz wrote an essay in Quillette criticizing the BJL as "a small local terrorist organization that made life miserable for many (including the many black students) who did not agree with its members’ demands". Katz's description of the BJL was criticized by faculty administrators of the Department of Classics, including department chair Michael Flower, and Princeton University president Christopher L. Eisgruber, but the university did not put Katz under investigation for formal action.

In early 2022, Princeton University reopened an investigation into Katz stemming from a 2018 suspension for engaging in a consensual sexual relationship with a student. The reopening of the investigation was criticized by conservatives and some free speech advocates as punishing Katz for his views about the BJL and other political matters. Katz was fired in May 2022.
