= Joshua Katz =

American linguist and classicist

- Born: Joshua Timothy Katz; September 12, 1969 (age 57); New York, U.S.
- Occupation: Former Professor at Princeton University
- Spouse: Solveig Lucia Gold (m. 2021)
- Parent: Thomas J. Katz (father)
- Awards: Marshall Scholarship (1991); Guggenheim Fellowship (2010); Visiting Fellowship at All Souls College, Oxford (2010)

Academic background
- Education: Yale University (BA); University of Oxford (MPhil); Harvard University (PhD)
- Thesis: Topics in Indo-European Personal Pronouns (1998)
- Doctoral advisor: Calvert Watkins

Academic work
- Discipline: Historical linguistics, Comparative linguistics, Classics
- Institutions: Princeton University (1998–2022); Institute for Advanced Study (2002–2003); École pratique des Hautes Études (2011); University of Berlin (2015)

Joshua Timothy Katz (born September 12, 1969) is an American linguist and classicist who was the Cotsen Professor in the Humanities at Princeton University until May 2022. He is a scholar on the languages, literatures, and cultures of ancient and medieval history. Currently, he is a senior fellow at the American Enterprise Institute.

In 2020, Katz wrote an essay in Quillette which included criticisms of the Black Justice League at Princeton, leading to a backlash on the Princeton campus and the rescinding of a conference invitation by the American Council of Learned Societies. Katz's contentions that his views were being suppressed attracted support from conservatives and some academic freedom advocates.

In 2021, The Daily Princetonian reported that Katz had been suspended in 2018 for engaging in a consensual sexual relationship with a student in violation of university policy. In May 2022, he was fired after a second investigation concluded that he had lied during the 2018 sexual misconduct investigation.

== Early life and education ==
Katz was born in New York in 1969, the son of chemist Thomas J. Katz. He attended the Dalton School in New York City before attending Yale University for his bachelor's degree in linguistics, graduating summa cum laude. After graduating from Yale, Katz attended the University of Oxford on a Marshall Scholarship and earned a master's degree in general linguistics and comparative philology in 1993. He completed a Ph.D. in linguistics at Harvard University in 1998.

== Academic career ==
Katz joined the faculty of Princeton University as a classics lecturer in 1998 and, by 2006, had received tenure as an associate professor. From September 2002 to August 2003, Katz was a member of the School of Historical Studies at the Institute for Advanced Study. In 2008, he became full professor at Princeton. He has since held visiting professorships at the École Pratique des Hautes Études, Université Paris Diderot, and the University of Berlin.

Katz became a popular undergraduate teacher at Princeton and was awarded the President's Award for Distinguished Teaching in 2003, the Phi Beta Kappa Teaching Award in 2008, and the Sophie and L. Edward Cotsen Faculty Fellowship. He was praised by the university for “the care he takes with students in and out of the classroom” and was recognized as one of four faculty members for outstanding teaching in 2003, with a class of his making The Daily Beast's list of "hottest college courses" in 2011. Katz was president of Princeton's Phi Beta Kappa society for two terms, department representative for the classics from 2003 to 2005, a member of the Faculty-Student Committee on Discipline, and director of the Behrman Undergraduate Society of Fellows, which he founded in 2009.

Katz chaired the selection committee of the Barry Scholarship at the University of Oxford. As of 2023, the chair is Christian Sahner. When plans for the University of Austin were announced in 2021, he joined its board of advisors. He is also a senior fellow at the American Enterprise Institute.

=== Political controversy and sexual misconduct investigations ===
Katz was investigated by Princeton twice, stemming from a relationship he had with a student around 2005. Before the second investigation, he wrote a controversial opinion piece about race on campus, near the peak of the 2020 George Floyd protests. The second investigation over his student relationship, which led to his termination, created its own controversy over possible free speech suppression, since it came on the heels of Katz's previous controversy.

==== First investigation ====
A Princeton University investigation in 2018 found that during the mid-2000s, Katz had engaged in a multi-year consensual relationship with a female undergraduate student in the classics department in violation of university policy on faculty-student relationships. The investigation resulted in Katz taking a year of unpaid leave as a suspension. It was not made public until 2021.

==== July 2020 essay ====
Throughout 2020–2021, Katz wrote essays in The Wall Street Journal, The Spectator, Quillette, and National Review, among others, criticizing political correctness. On July 8, 2020, Katz wrote an essay in Quillette opposing the recommendations of a "Faculty letter", signed by 480 members of Princeton faculty, to address racist aspects of Princeton's history. Asserting that, "plenty of ideas in the letter are ones I support", he also noted that, "there are dozens of proposals that, if implemented, would lead to civil war on campus and erode even further public confidence in how elite institutions of higher education operate. Some examples: “Reward the invisible work done by faculty of color with course relief and summer salary” and “Faculty of color hired at the junior level should be guaranteed one additional semester of sabbatical” and “Provide additional human resources for the support of junior faculty of color.""

Katz's long essay criticized the Faculty letter on several other points. His description of a former Princeton student group, the Black Justice League (BJL), as "a small local terrorist organization that made life miserable for many (including the many black students) who did not agree with its members’ demands" was immediately condemned by representatives of Princeton. Katz added to his characterization: "Recently I watched an “Instagram Live” of one of its alumni leaders, who—emboldened by recent events and egged on by over 200 supporters who were baying for blood—presided over what was effectively a Struggle Session against one of his former classmates. It was one of the most evil things I have ever witnessed, and I do not say this lightly."

Katz's description of the BJL as a terrorist organization was criticized by the Department of Classics' chair Michael Flower and Princeton University president Christopher L. Eisgruber, although the university did not put Katz under investigation for formal action. The editorial board of The Wall Street Journal and columnist Rod Dreher praised Katz for speaking out against cancel culture once the story reached national attention.

On July 27, Katz wrote an op-ed for the Wall Street Journal titled "I Survived Cancellation at Princeton" and noted that a message of condemnation on the Department of Classics' website had been taken down. As a result of the controversy, the American Council of Learned Societies (ACLS) revoked an invitation for Katz to be a volunteer delegate for ALCS to the Union Académique Internationale conference in Paris. Katz sued the ACLS in February 2021 for viewpoint discrimination. A judge dismissed the lawsuit due to jurisdiction standards, but did not rule on the merits of Katz's claims.

==== Second investigation and firing ====
In February 2021, The Daily Princetonian reported the university's 2018 misconduct investigation that had led to Katz's suspension. Katz acknowledged breaking the university's rules. Princeton began a second investigation, which concluded in November 2021 that Katz had "misrepresented facts" in the 2018 inquiry and had discouraged the former student in the relationship from cooperating with it. Supporters of Katz, including the American Council of Trustees and Alumni (ACTA) and the Foundation for Individual Rights in Education, criticized the university, alleging the investigation sought to suppress Katz's free speech rights.

Princeton University president Christopher L. Eisgruber called for Katz's removal from the university on May 10, 2022, based on the new evidence from the second investigation. Katz was dismissed from the faculty after a vote by the university's board of trustees on May 23, 2022. The Wall Street Journal published an opinion article by Katz soon after, in which he alleged that the university had fired him for political reasons and had misrepresented his positions to provoke dissent.

== Personal life ==
In July 2021, Katz married Solveig Lucia Gold, a doctoral candidate in classics at University of Cambridge, who graduated from Princeton in 2017 and is one of his former undergraduate students.
