= Rose Mandel =

Polish-American photographer (1910–2002)

- crop of picture by Richard Muffley
- Born: 2 August 1910; Czaniec, Galicia, Austria-Hungary
- Died: 12 March 2002 (aged 91); Berkeley, California, U.S.
- Known for: photography

Rose Mandel (August 2, 1910 – March 12, 2002) was a Polish-born American photographer, who was awarded a Guggenheim Fellowship in 1967.

== Early life ==
Rose Mandel was born in a Jewish family in Czaniec, Galicia, Austria-Hungary (now Poland) in 1910. She studied child psychology with Jean Piaget in Geneva, at the Rousseau Institute. She lived in Paris in the 1930s. In 1942, during World War II, she and her husband Arthur left Europe for America. They arrived in Staten Island, New York on a steamer carrying hundreds of immigrants, including the celebrated French artist Marcel Duchamp. Her country destroyed, family members and friends killed in the Holocaust, she made the San Francisco Bay Area her new home. An introduction to Edward Weston inspired Mandel to study photography as an art form. She studied photography at the California School of Fine Arts, with Ansel Adams and Minor White as instructors. One of her classmates, who became a close friend, was Richard Diebenkorn.

== Career ==
Mandel was interested in exploring the many avenues of the photographic process. From the late 1940s through the early 1970s, she created original portraits, close-ups of nature, abstractions of water and street photographs. Rose Mandel roamed the streets of San Francisco with her “cumbersome 4-by-5-inch view camera and tripod, capturing store fronts, doorways, advertisements, and graffiti, the kind of things people pass everyday but rarely notice amid the urban clutter”. These black and white photographs she captured displayed “sanctuaries charged with human hopes and longings...touching on all the intangible havens of the human spirit stored in half-forgotten memories”. Many of these sequenced images are on exhibit at the Art Institute of Chicago. Rose Mandel stressed sequence imaging rather than single images, “an approach with resounding influence in contemporary photography”. “For Mandel, the photograph was meant not simply to describe the world but also to suggest its infinite forms and evoke its many moods,” says Julian Cox, founding curator of photography and chief curator, Fine Arts Museums of San Francisco. Mandel had a strong understanding of psychology from her earlier studies and that combined with her knowledge of abstract expressionism allowed her to capture photographs that peer back at the viewer. This along with the subjects she chose to photographs being carefully chosen led her to be described as “a painter with a camera” Mandel was senior photographer for the art department at the University of California. The art that was created outside of her work was hers alone, and was not driven by a need to promote or sell. Mandel did not participate in the art market, only printed in modest numbers, and was not interested in gallery representation or aggressive marketing. She did however take part in several solo and group exhibitions. Her 1948 show, "On Walls and Behind Glass", at the San Francisco Museum of Art, focused on street photography. It comprised Mandel's twenty contact prints, incorporating reflections and graffiti in San Francisco.

In 1954, she had a solo exhibit at the California Palace of the Legion of Honor, titled "The Errand of the Eye," after an Emily Dickinson poem. The photographs in this show were mostly nature subjects in closeup. This sequence of 49 photographs dating from 1951 to 1954 consisted of contact prints of delicate flowers, weeds, branches, twigs, and thorns, in which an area of the picture was in sharp focus while the rest was selectively blurred. Following the 1954 exhibition The Errand of the Eye, landscapes made in and around the shoreline of the Berkeley Marina and San Francisco Bay became Mandel's primary focus. In 1956, photographs by Rose Mandel accompanied an ARTnews profile of Richard Diebenkorn. "I never tried to imitate painting," Mandel explained late in life. "I wanted to be very photographic, 100 percent photographic." Her work was recognized with a Guggenheim Fellowship in 1967. From the mid-1960s through about 1972, Mandel moved away from the intimate contact-print format, which she described as being time capsules of her innermost feelings. Mandel's last photographs were made between 1970 and 1972.

== Personal life ==
Rose Mandel died in Berkeley, California, in 2002, aged 91 years. In 2013, a retrospective titled "The Errand of the Eye: Photographs by Rose Mandel," featuring 80 of her works, was organized by the de Young Museum in San Francisco, California.
