= Carmen Moral =

Carmen Moral is an orchestra conductor and also teaches conducting at Berklee College of Music in Boston, Massachusetts.

== Biography ==
She holds master's degrees from the Manhattan School of Music and Columbia University (New York) and a master's degree and a DEA in Musicology from the Sorbonne (Paris). She studied conducting with Ionel Perlea of New York City's Metropolitan and with Laszlo Halasz, one of the founders of the City Center Opera of New York.

She was the first woman to become a Music Director and Conductor of a major Latin American orchestra : the National Symphony Orchestra of Peru, her native country. She was selected for this position by a competition in which she was the only woman participant. Since then, several orchestras have entrusted her with the post of Music Director, such as the Bogotá Philharmonic Orchestra (Colombia), I. Frauen-Kammerorchester von Osterreich (Vienna), the Symphony Orchestra of Mimar Sinan University (Istanbul), and, for a second time, the National Symphony orchestra of Peru. She served for six years as First Conductor of the Istanbul State Opera. She became Conductor Emeritus of the National Symphony Orchestra of Peru, "Gran Official" of the Merit Order-City of Bogotá and Medal of Honor of the Peruvian Culture.

Her repertoire encompasses a wide range of musical styles and genres-symphony, opera and chamber music- represented in more than 700 works. She has conducted numerous world premieres. The George Enescu Philharmonic (Bucharest), the Symphony Orchestra of Russia (Moscow), the Tonkunstlerorchester (Vienna), the Buenos Aires Philharmonic, the Pasdeloup Orchestra (Paris), the National Symphony Orchestra of Mexico, and the Chamber Orchestras of Lausanne and Vienna are among the 80 orchestras that have invited her to serve as a guest conductor. Her concerts in 26 countries of Europe, Asia and the Americas have taken her to such theaters as the Grosser Musikvereinssaal of Vienna, the Kennedy Center of Washington, D.C., the Bolshoi Hall of Moscow Conservatory, the Teatro Colón of Buenos Aires, the Teatro Bellas Artes of Mexico, D.F., the Theater of the Nationalities of Beijing, and the Salle Pleyel of Paris.
