= Mary E. Brunkow =

American molecular biologist (born 1961)

Mary Elizabeth Brunkow
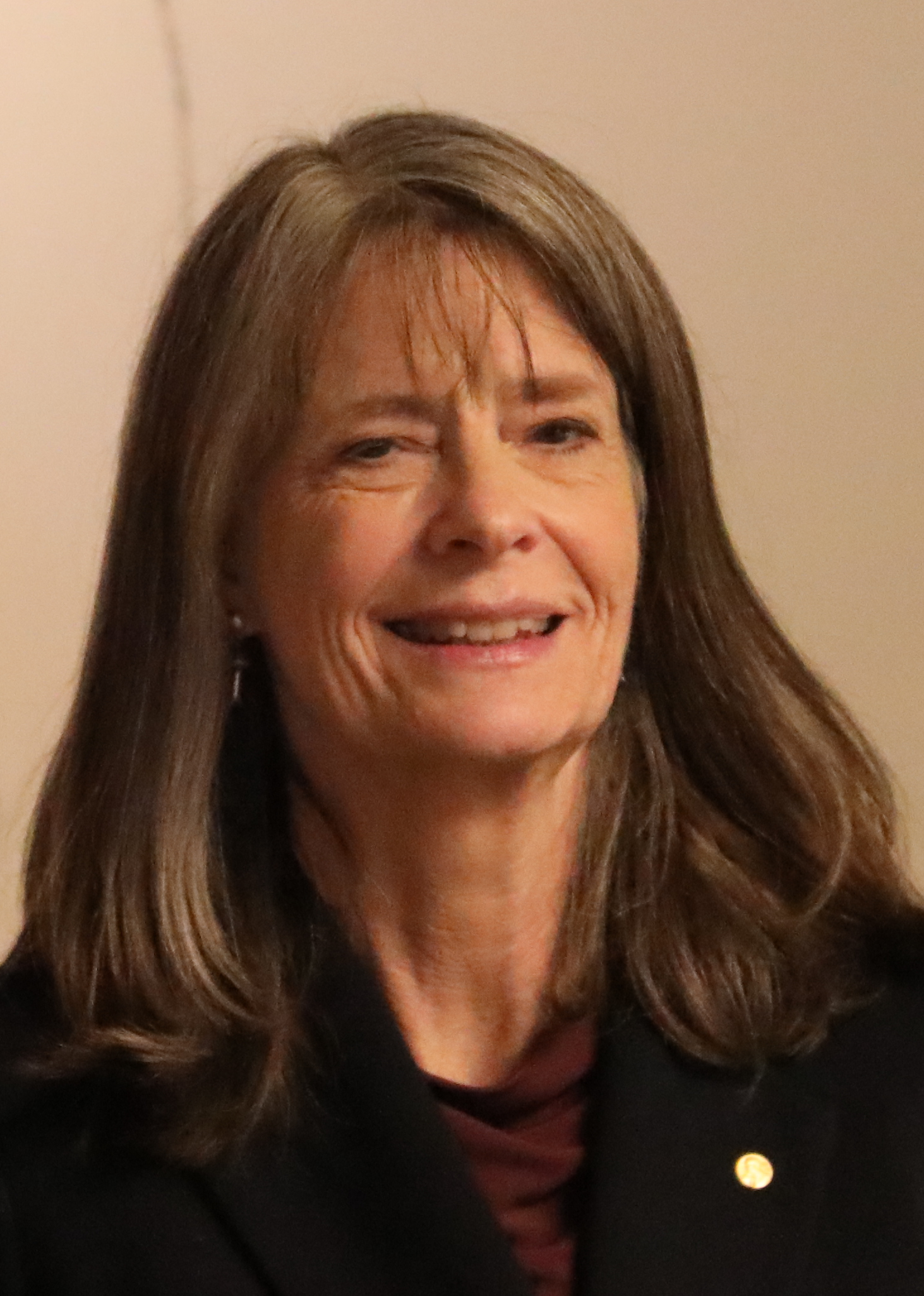
- Brunkow at the U.S. Embassy Sweden Nobel Laureate reception.
- Born: April 13, 1961 (age 65); Portland, Oregon, U.S.
- Education: University of Washington (BS); Princeton University (PhD)
- Known for: FOXP3
- Awards: Nobel Prize in Physiology or Medicine (2025)
- Scientific career
- Fields: Immunology; Molecular biology
- Workplaces: Institute for Systems Biology; Celltech R&D
- Thesis: Expression and function of the H19 gene in transgenic mice (1991)
- Doctoral advisor: Shirley M. Tilghman

Mary Elizabeth Brunkow (born April 13, 1961) is an American molecular biologist, immunologist and Nobel Prize laureate. She is known for co-identifying the gene later named FOXP3 as the cause of the scurfy mouse phenotype, a finding that became foundational for modern regulatory T cell biology.

In 2025, she was jointly awarded the Nobel Prize in Physiology or Medicine with Fred Ramsdell and Shimon Sakaguchi for their work in peripheral immune tolerance.

== Early life and education ==
Brunkow was born on April 13, 1961 in Portland, Oregon. She graduated from St. Mary's Academy in Portland in 1979.

Brunkow received a Bachelor of Science with a major in molecular and cellular biology from the University of Washington in 1983 and a Doctor of Philosophy in molecular biology from Princeton University in 1991. Her doctoral advisor was Shirley M. Tilghman. Her doctoral dissertation was titled Expression and function of the H19 gene in transgenic mice (1991).

== Career ==
Brunkow worked in industry research in the Seattle area, at Celltech R&D in Bothell, Washington, which is where she and Fred Ramsdell performed their Nobel Prize-winning work on FOXP3, and later she became senior program manager at the Institute for Systems Biology in Seattle.

== Research ==
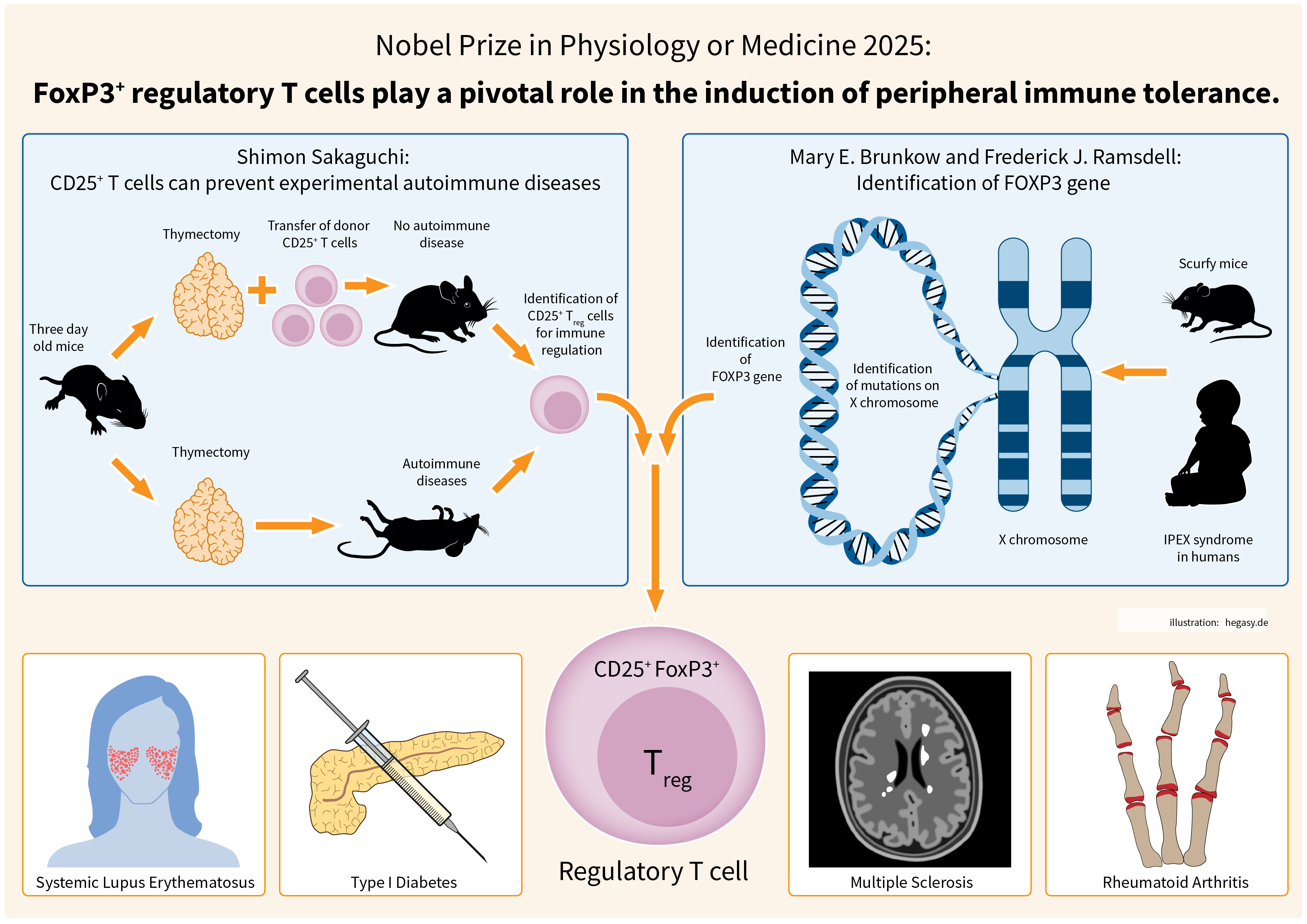
Nobel Prize in Physiology or Medicine 2025: Pivotal role of FoxP3^{+} T_{reg} cells in peripheral immune tolerance.

Brunkow is a co-author of the 2001 Nature Genetics paper that identified the scurfy gene product, initially termed scurfin and later known as FOXP3, linking its disruption to a fatal lymphoproliferative disorder in mice.

Brunkow's most cited work mapped the scurfy defect to FOXP3 and demonstrated that loss of this transcription factor drives uncontrolled T cell activation and lethal lymphoproliferation, positioning FOXP3 at the center of peripheral immune tolerance mediated by regulatory T cells. The genetic identification of FOXP3 provided a molecular basis for understanding how the immune system restrains self-reactivity outside the thymus and catalyzed extensive work on regulatory T cell development and function.

== Honors and awards ==
On October 6, 2025, the Nobel Assembly at the Karolinska Institute in Stockholm, Sweden, announced that Brunkow, Fred Ramsdell, and Shimon Sakaguchi would share the Nobel Prize in Physiology or Medicine for discoveries concerning peripheral immune tolerance. On June 24, 2026, Brunkow received the Golden Plate Award of the American Academy of Achievement presented by Awards Council members Frances Arnold and Lotte Bjerre Knudsen at a ceremony in Washington, D.C.
