= Édgar Valcárcel =

Peruvian composer and pianist

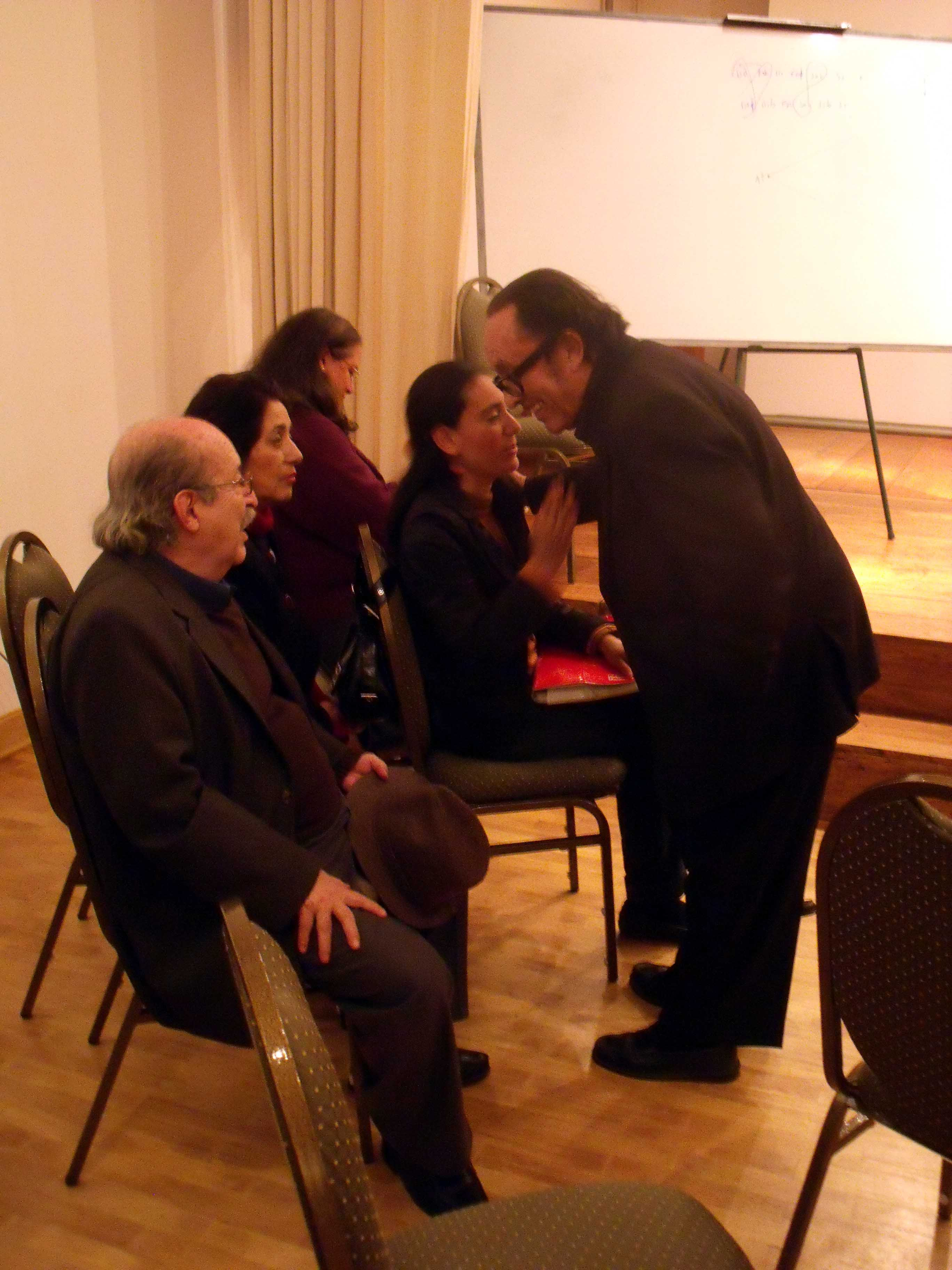
Germinaciones 2009 - Encuentro con Edgar Valcarcel

Edgar Valcárcel (December 4, 1932 - March 10, 2010) was a Peruvian composer and pianist.

A native of Puno, Valcárcel was the nephew of Teodoro Valcárcel. He studied composition at the National Conservatory of Music in Lima under Andrés Sas; further study followed with Donald Lybbert at Hunter College in New York. In Buenos Aires he worked with Alberto Ginastera; during his career he also studied in Paris, with Olivier Messiaen, and in Italy, with Riccardo Malipiero, Bruno Maderna, and Luigi Dallapiccola. At the Electronic Music Center he worked with Vladimir Ussachevsky; he later returned to Peru, teaching piano and harmony at the conservatory in Lima. Valcárcel received two Guggenheim Fellowships for composition, in 1965 and again in 1967. His music combines serial and aleatory techniques. He died in Lima.
