= Thomas J. Katz =

American organic chemist

- Born: Thomas Joseph Katz; March 21, 1936 (age 90); Prague, Czechoslovakia
- Education: University of Wisconsin–Madison (BA); Harvard University (PhD)
- Known for: Metal-Sandwich Compounds; Mechanism of Metal-Catalyzed Cycloaddition Reactions; Valence Isomers of Benzene; Olefin Metathesis Reaction; Enyne Metathesis Reaction
- Children: Joshua Katz
- Awards: Presidential Awards for Excellence in Teaching; Arthur C. Cope Scholar Award (1995)
- Scientific career
- Fields: Organic chemistry Organometallic chemistry
- Workplaces: Columbia University
- Doctoral advisor: R. B. Woodward

Thomas Joseph Katz (born March 21, 1936) is an American organic chemist known for his experimental work with prismane, olefin metathesis, and enyne metathesis. He is an emeritus professor at Columbia University.

== Early life and education ==
Thomas Joseph Katz was born on March 21, 1936, in Prague, then Czechoslovakia, from which his family escaped to Canada after the Nazi invasion in March 1939. His family settled for three years in Toronto, Canada, and then moved to New York City, where Katz attended public schools.

Katz graduated from the University of Wisconsin in 1956 and then went, under an NSF Graduate Research Fellowship Program, to Harvard University for studies in chemistry and research in R. B. Woodward’s laboratory. And it was in Woodward’s lab that Katz conducted seminal work on the mechanism of the Diels–Alder reaction, and by his conceiving of and carrying out a transformation that completed a puzzle, revealed the then unknown structure of the alkaloid calycanthine. Katz was awarded the Ph.D. degree in 1959 and then moved into a faculty position in chemistry at Columbia University.

== Academic career ==
Katz was an instructor at Columbia University from 1959 until 1961, then an assistant professor from 1961 to 1964. He became an Associate Professor in 1964, and then a full Professor in 1968. In 1965, he was a Visiting Associate Professor at University of California Berkeley, and he was a Visiting Professor at the University of Konstanz, Germany in 1988. In 2009, he retired, becoming Professor Emeritus.

== Personal life ==
It was at Columbia that Katz met Meta Oehmsen, a graduate student in English literature, whom he married in 1963. Joshua Katz, their son, is a linguist and classicist.
