= Daniel H. Calhoun =

American historian (1927-2019)

President of the Society for Historians of the Early American Republic
- In office 1982–1983

Personal details
- Born: November 24, 1927 Brownsville, Tennessee, U.S.
- Died: March 23, 2019 (aged 91) Santa Rosa, California, U.S.
- Occupation: Historian
- Awards: Guggenheim Fellowship (1967)

Academic background
- Education: Yale University; Johns Hopkins University
- Thesis: The American civil engineers, 1792-1843 (1956)

Daniel Hovey Calhoun (November 24, 1927 – March 23, 2019) was an American historian. A 1967 Guggenheim Fellow, his works included The American Civil Engineer (1960), Professional Lives in America (1965), The Intelligence of a People (1973). He was a professor at University of California, Davis for more than twenty years and president of the Society for Historians of the Early American Republic from 1982 to 1983.

== Biography ==
Daniel Hovey Calhoun was born on November 24, 1927, in Brownsville, Tennessee, and raised at the Rosenwald School grounds where his father worked. After studying at University School of Nashville (then called Peabody Demonstration School) and Yale University (where he obtained his BA in history in 1952), he went to Johns Hopkins University, where he obtained his PhD in 1956; his doctoral dissertation was The American civil engineers, 1792-1843.

He worked as an instructor and lecturer at Princeton University (1956-1958), Columbia University (1958-1959), and Harvard University (1959-1966), where he was promoted to assistant professor in 1962. In 1966, he started working at University of California, Davis (UC Davis) and became assistant professor of history. In 1967, he was awarded a Guggenheim Fellowship "for studies of the changing intellectual level in American society, 1750-1870". He was president of the Society for Historians of the Early American Republic from 1982 to 1983. He retired from UC Davis in 1991 and later became professor emeritus.

He wrote several books such as The American Civil Engineer (1960), Professional Lives in America (1965), The Educating of Americans (1969), The Intelligence of a People (1973), Working Views on the One-Party Road (1986), Popular Challenge: Roads toward Civil War in North America (1995); and "The 47": American War in Mexico (1998). There were also three other manuscripts that had not been published at the time of his death. He once curated his own edited volume of primary sources for his course on American law and violence.

Calhoun was gay and was part of the San Francisco Bay Area's LGBTQ community. He also sailed and drew seascapes for a hobby.

Calhoun died on March 23, 2019 in Santa Rosa, California. He was 91. The Daniel H. Calhoun Dissertation Research Award at UC Davis is named after him.

== Bibliography ==
- The American Civil Engineer (1960)
- Professional Lives in America (1965)
- The Intelligence of a People (1973)
