= Shirley M. Tilghman =

Canadian academic and University president

Shirley Tilghman OC FRS
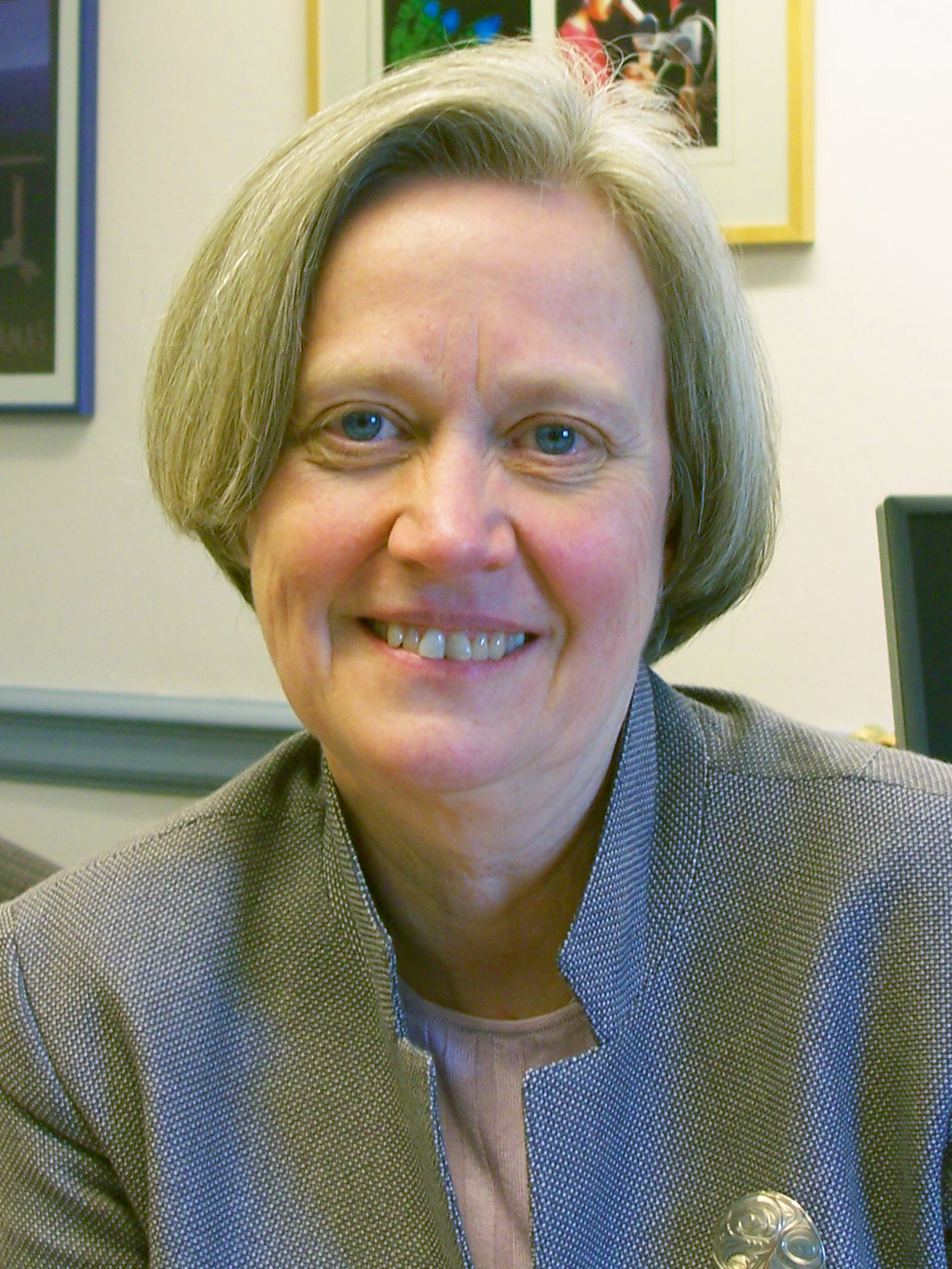
- Tilghman in 2006

19th President of Princeton University
- In office June 15, 2001 – July 1, 2013
- Preceded by: Harold Tafler Shapiro
- Succeeded by: Christopher L. Eisgruber

Personal details
- Born: Shirley Marie Caldwell; 17 September 1946 (age 80) Toronto, Canada
- Spouse: Joseph Tilghman (1970–1983)
- Children: 2
- Education: Queen's University (BSc); Temple University (MS, PhD)
- Scientific career
- Fields: Molecular biology
- Workplaces: Princeton University
- Thesis: The hormonal regulation of phosphoenolpyruvate carboxykinase (1975)
- Doctoral advisor: Richard W. Hanson
- Doctoral students: Mary E. Brunkow

Shirley Marie Tilghman OC FRS (/ˈtɪlmən/; née Caldwell; born 17 September 1946) is a Canadian scholar in molecular biology. She is a professor emerita of molecular biology and public policy and president emerita of Princeton University. She served as the 19th president of Princeton University from June 2001 to July 2013.

Tilghman was a member of the faculty of Princeton's Department of Molecular Biology for fifteen years before being named president and returned to the faculty after her service as president. In 2002, Discover magazine recognized her as one of the 50 most important women in science.

== Early life and family ==
Tilghman was born Shirley Marie Caldwell, in Toronto, Ontario, Canada. As a young child, her father encouraged her interest in math. Together, the two of them would play math games as bedtime, rather than sharing bedtime stories.

She graduated from Kelvin High School in Winnipeg, Manitoba and received her honours B.Sc. in chemistry from Queen's University in Kingston, Ontario, in 1968. She was a secondary school teacher in Sierra Leone, West Africa, in the Canadian University Services Overseas (CUSO) Program. Tilghman earned her Ph.D. in biochemistry from Temple University in Philadelphia, Pennsylvania, under Richard W. Hanson. Tilghman was Hanson's first graduate student. Her PhD dissertation was titled, "The Hormonal Regulation of Phosphoenolpyruvate Carboxykinase."

== Research ==
Tilghman's work in molecular genetics focused on the regulation of genes during development, particularly in the field of genomic imprinting.

During postdoctoral studies at the National Institutes of Health, Tilghman made a number of discoveries while a member of the team which cloned the first mammalian gene. She went on to demonstrate that the globin gene was spliced, a finding that helped confirm some of the revolutionary theories then emerging about gene behavior. As an independent investigator at the Fox Chase Cancer Center in Philadelphia from 1980 to 1986 and adjunct associate professor of Human Genetics at the University of Pennsylvania Tilghman continued to make scientific breakthroughs.

Tilghman went to Princeton University in 1986 as the Howard A. Prior Professor of the Life Sciences. Two years later, she also joined the Howard Hughes Medical Institute as an investigator. She was a leader in the use of mice to understand the behavior of genes by researching the effect of gene insertion in embryonic cells.

In 1998, she took on additional responsibilities as the founding director of Princeton's multi-disciplinary Lewis-Sigler Institute for Integrative Genomics, while continuing to study how male and female genomes are packaged and the consequences of the differences for regulating embryo growth.

Tilghman's extensive series of published research papers are catalogued on the PubMed government website of the United States National Library of Medicine, the NLM division of the National Institutes of Health.

== President of Princeton University ==
A 2006 interview with Tilghman on her presidency

Tilghman succeeded Harold Tafler Shapiro and became the 19th president of Princeton University in 2001. She was elected Princeton's first woman president on May 5, 2001, and assumed office on June 15, 2001. Under her administration, the university built a sixth residential college, named in honor of alumna Meg Whitman, to accommodate an 11 percent expansion of the undergraduate student body (an increase of some 500 students), as recommended by a special committee of the Board of Trustees chaired by Paul M. Wythes. In 2012, Tilghman announced that she would step down from her presidency in June 2013. She was succeeded by the university's then-provost, Christopher L. Eisgruber.

For Tilghman, Princeton has two essential missions. "One is to ensure that our doors are open as wide as possible to every talented student in the world who is capable of doing the hard work we ask of them. And that means maintaining our commitment to financial aid, which is the tool – the critical tool – to get those students to Princeton. And the second thing is that we must address the most critical issues, and push back the frontiers of knowledge, and not just in science and technology, but in social policy, and in public policy, and in understanding the nature of the human condition."

The establishment of Whitman College, together with the reconstruction of Butler College, accompanied a significant reconfiguration of Princeton's residential college system, which now incorporates upperclassmen as well as freshmen and sophomores, providing new residential options and increasing opportunities for social interaction across the student body. In addition, an effort has been made to strengthen the relationship between the university and Princeton's independent eating clubs, where most upperclassmen take their meals, with the goal of enhancing the undergraduate experience of all students. In 2009, she appointed a committee chaired by Nannerl O. Keohane to review undergraduate women's leadership at Princeton.

=== Academics ===
Tilghman has presided over a number of academic initiatives at Princeton, including the creation of a Center for African American Studies, the Lewis Center for the Arts (named after alumnus Peter B. Lewis), the Princeton Neuroscience Institute and the Andlinger Center for Energy and the Environment (after alumnus Gerhard R. Andlinger). Along with the renewal of the Department of Chemistry, these steps have both capitalized on Princeton's existing strengths and broken new ground, ensuring that the university will, in Tilghman's words, continue "to make the world a better place through the power of the mind and the imagination."

=== Diversity ===
More broadly, Tilghman's presidency has placed an emphasis on increasing the diversity of Princeton's faculty and students; widening access to the university through improvements to its generous financial aid program and the elimination of admission through "early decision"; fostering a multidisciplinary approach to teaching and research; and strengthening the university's international perspective through a wide range of initiatives – from the Global Scholars Program, which brings international scholars to campus on a recurring basis, to the Bridge Year Program, which gives incoming freshmen an opportunity to defer their studies for a year in order to devote themselves to public service overseas.

=== Funding higher education ===
==== Student loans ====
As her presidency started the university accomplished the long-hoped-for goal of eliminating the need for student loans; Princeton became the first American university to replace student loans with grants from its endowment. In principle, students earning a Princeton degree could graduate debt free.

==== Tuition ====
The size of the endowment and the success of these programs prompted some to question whether Tilghman would implement a policy of eliminating tuition altogether. In her Wall Street Journal article on this matter, she indicated that Princeton would continue to charge tuition, and that she felt that charging tuition was a morally and economically correct policy to maintain.

==== Fundraising ====
During her tenure the percentage of students receiving some form of financial aid increased and the size of the average award also increased. These policies were partially facilitated by the growing size of the university's financial endowment, whose income is used to finance the university's mission alongside tuition, and the annual funding of the operating budget through alumni donations from Princeton's Annual Giving campaign.

=== Controversies ===
==== Pro-women hirings ====
Although President Tilghman has been accused of favoring women in her hiring practices, in fact, most of her appointees have been men.

The women she has hired to senior positions include Amy Gutmann as provost, the second-most-powerful administrative position in the university, Anne-Marie Slaughter as Dean of the Princeton School of Public and International Affairs fka Woodrow Wilson School of Public and International Affairs as well as her successor Christina Paxson, Maria Klawe as Dean of the School of Engineering and Applied Science, and Janet Lavin Rapelye as the Dean of Admission. Gutman would go on to lead the University of Pennsylvania as their president in early 2004; Klawe was chosen president of Harvey Mudd College in 2006. Slaughter took a leave from the university to serve as Director of Policy and Planning at the U.S. State Department, reporting to the Secretary of State at the time, Hillary Clinton. Paxson became president of Brown University in 2012.

Tilghman has appointed prominent men to leadership positions at Princeton, such as Charles Kalmbach as the senior vice president for administration, the highest non-academic administrative post, David P. Dobkin as dean of the faculty, Gutmann's replacement as provost and Tilghman's successor Christopher L. Eisgruber, and Klawe's replacement Vincent Poor.

She initiated a review of undergraduate women's leadership at Princeton, chaired by Nannerl O. Keohane; the review found that the early prominence for women in leadership positions that accompanied to introduction of women students to the campus had recently not been as frequently repeated.

==== Ivy League seven-week athletic moratorium ====
Tilghman signed on to the Ivy League-wide seven-week athletic moratorium, since modified, in which intercollegiate athletes were enjoined from taking part in supervised practices and other obligatory athletic activities for seven weeks during the academic year in order to encourage them to participate in other activities. Supporters of the proposal pointed to studies by former Princeton president William G. Bowen, whose controversial book The Game of Life purported to describe widespread academic "underperformance" of college athletes. Detractors claimed that the book was flawed, and the moratorium represented an encroachment on students' freedom to use their time as they saw fit.

==== University donor complaint ====
During her presidency, Tilghman was embroiled in a court case pitting her against the family of a major donor to the university, the Robertsons. The children of the original donors, who were themselves Princeton alums, alleged that the university failed to apply the funds donated by their parents to the intended purpose, and asked for the funds to be restored to the family for use elsewhere. The donated funds had become joined with the university's general endowment, resulting in efficiencies and benefits in fund management and performance, which were not the subject of the Robertsons' complaints. The case was settled in 2008 with a payment to the family of $40 million in legal fees and another $50 million, plus interest, to a new foundation to support education for government service. Princeton retained the remainder of the money for the Wilson school.

==== Corporate board matters ====
In August 2012, Tilghman was subpoenaed in her dual capacities as Princeton's president and as a member of Google's board, as part of a suit to block a board approved 2-for-1 Google stock split that the complaining party claimed would represent "an unfair effort to diminish its voting power while reserving voting rights for the company’s founders Larry Page and Sergey Brin". All members of the Google board received subpoenas. In the case of Tilghman, "records of donations, contribution pledges or promises made by Tilghman or the university to any charities, organizations, foundations or educational institutions that have any affiliation with Page, Brin, Schmidt or Google" were demanded.

=== Precedents ===
While Tilghman disquieted some alumni by championing affirmative action policies, establishing a single admission process, and broadening the range of residential and dining options available to students, she also found strong support for these actions and their underpinning vision. Tilghman presided over a major effort to advance the growing community of Princeton Alumnae, culminating in a campus conference entitled "She Roars". In her final year, Tilghman led the first major university celebration for "alternative genders", resulting in an immensely successful on-campus LGBT alumni gathering; this was the first of its kind on any campus in the United States and set a precedent for the advancement of the LGBT community nationwide.

=== Internal roles ===
As president of Princeton University, Tilghman was also an ex-officio trustee of the Princeton Board of Trustees, and chairman of Princeton Honorary Degrees Committee.

Tilghman orchestrated an orderly transition from her other Princeton roles after being named president. David Botstein succeeded Tilghman as the Director of the Lewis-Sigler Institute of Integrative Genomics in 2003. Ned S Wingreen succeeded her as the Howard A Prior Professor of Life Sciences. She eventually closed her lab to dedicate her time fully to the presidency; in doing so, she assured that all students who had begun with her as adviser were able to successfully complete their degrees and associated research before the lab closed.

An award-winning teacher, Tilghman continued to conduct classes even while serving as president.

She became a "Princeton Parent" when her daughter matriculated at Princeton as an undergraduate during her tenure as president and was accorded honorary alumna status to a record number of Princeton classes.

=== External roles ===
While serving as president of Princeton, Tilghman accepted membership on the board of directors of Google, and served in that capacity from October 2005 to February 2018. As compensation for joining the board, she received 6,000 shares of stock that by 2005 were worth in excess of her Princeton compensation package that by 2003 had reached $533,057.

Beginning in 2001, she served for a time on the Queen University's Chemistry Innovation Council in order to help the development of the Chemistry program at Queen's, which is based in Kingston, Ontario, Canada.

Tilghman served on the board of trustees at Cold Spring Harbor Laboratory (CSHL), Long Island, New York, during the early years of her presidency.

In 2006, Tilghman was one of three sitting university presidents who served on the Duke University President's Council that investigated the university's wide-ranging actions after the lacrosse players scandal wherein members of the Duke lacrosse team were charged with various types of inappropriate and allegedly illegal off campus behavior.

=== Successor ===
On September 21, 2012, Shirley informed the Princeton Board of Trustees that she planned to step down as the 19th president of Princeton University at the end of the 2012 academic year. On April 21, 2013, it was announced that Christopher L. Eisgruber would succeed Tilghman as Princeton's president, effective July 1. Notable Princeton alumnus Peter Lewis 1955 said at the time, "Ideally, she'd be remembered for grooming a terrific successor."

== Personal life ==
Tilghman, as Shirley Marie Caldwell, married Joseph Tilghman in 1970, and took his surname.

This marriage ended in 1983, leaving Tilghman with the custody of their young daughter (Rebecca) and infant son (Alex). She attributes her successful balancing of a scientific career and caring for her family to organization and focus. Her goal was to not feel guilty while at work or at home, instead focusing on the task at hand.

"Two things have been paramount" to Tilghman, "her work and her family." When she was being interviewed as president of Princeton, one of the first questions she asked her interviewer, Harold Shapiro was, "Can one have a family life and be the president of a major university?" She insisted on assurances that this could be the case before moving her candidacy forward.

== Awards and honors ==
=== Memberships ===
Tilghman has been elected to the following organizations:

- Member of the American Philosophical Society (2000),
- Foreign Associate of the National Academy of Sciences, with Primary Field Cellular and Developmental Biology and Secondary Field Genetics
- Member, the Institute of Medicine
- Elected a Fellow of the Royal Society (1995)
- Founding member of the International Mammalian Genome Society.
- Honorary Member, Institute of Electrical and Electronics Engineers (IEEE) (2014)

She serves as a trustee of the Carnegie Endowment for International Peace and the Saudi Arabia’s King Abdullah University of Science and Technology. From 1993 through 2000, Tilghman chaired Princeton's Council on Science and Technology, which encourages teaching science and technology to students outside the sciences. In 1996, she received Princeton's President's Award for Distinguished Teaching.

Nineteen Princeton graduating classes, from 1941 to 2005, have made President Tilghman an honorary member.

=== Awards ===
Tilghman has earned the following awards during her career:

- American Society for Cell Biology (ASCB) Women in Cell Biology Award (2000)
- L'Oréal-UNESCO Awards for Women in Science (2002)
- Lifetime Achievement Award from the Society for Developmental Biology (2003)
- The Memorial Sloan-Kettering Medal for Outstanding Contributions to Biomedical Research (2005)
- Genetics Society of America Medal (2007)
- American Dream Award to Successful Immigrants to the U.S.A. (2007)
- Henry G. Friesen International Prize in Health Research (2010)
- Officer of the Order of Canada (2014)
- Benjamin Franklin Creativity Laureate in Science and Public Service, the Creativity Foundation (2014)
- Person of the Year, Science Careers from the Journal of Science (2014)
- UCSF (2017).
- Patrusky Lecturer (2018)
- Helen Dean King Award (2018)

=== Honorary degrees ===
The 19th president of Princeton University has received more than 19 honorary academic degrees:

- Honorary Doctor of Science, Bard College (2002)
- Honorary degree, Dickinson College (2002)
- Honorary Doctor of Laws, Simon Fraser University (2002)
- Honorary degree, University of British Columbia (2002)
- Honorary Doctor of Science, Yale University (2002)
- Honorary Doctor of Laws, Rider University (2002)
- Honorary degree, Drew University (2004)
- Honorary Doctor of Laws, Harvard University (2004)
- Honorary degree, Watson School of Biological Sciences, Cold Spring Harbor Laboratories (2004)
- Honorary Doctor of Science, Columbia University (2005)
- Honorary Doctor of Science, New York University (2005)
- Honorary Doctorate, Rockefeller University (2006)
- Honorary Doctor of Science, Rutgers University, The State University of New Jersey (2006)
- Honorary degree, Memorial University of Newfoundland (2007)
- Honorary Doctorate, Ryerson University (2007)
- Honorary Doctor of Science, Washington University (2007)
- Honorary Doctor of Human Letters, Amherst College (2008)
- Honorary degree, Rensselaer (RPI) (2008)
- Honorary Doctor of Science, UMBC (2009)
- Honorary Doctor of Laws, Princeton University (2013)

== Roles after Princeton presidency ==
Tilghman continues as a member of the Princeton faculty in the Department of Molecular Biology and is a faculty member of the Lewis-Sigler Institute for Integrative Genomics.

Upon leaving the Princeton presidency, Tilghman retained her seat on the Google board. At the time, Google's Eric Schmidt supported this retention by emphasizing the benefits Google had received from Tilghman generally in her service on the Board.

Tilghman continues to serve as a Trustee of Amherst College. She is a member of the board of the Brookhaven Science Associates, the organization that manages Brookhaven National Laboratory on Long Island, New York.

She is a Trustee of the Institute for Advanced Study. Tilghman serves on the board of the Broad Institute, founded to encourage a unique model of collaborative, inter-institutional research, initially through joint efforts between Harvard and MIT. She is a Trustee of LEDA, the Leadership Enterprise for a Diverse America.

In 2013, Tilghman was elected to serve as the 2015 president of the ASCB.

== Quotes ==
"What made it truly thrilling was that the genes were organized in a way that was totally unexpected. So nature took us by surprise."

"There are 25 years of good social science that demonstrate the many cultural practices that act collectively to discourage women from entering and continuing careers in science and engineering. The research is overwhelming, and it is there for anybody to see. On the other hand, the data that would suggest there are innate differences in the abilities of men and women to succeed in the natural sciences are nonexistent."

On how she hoped to spend her time during her sabbatical before returning to the faculty in 2014, Tilghman said, "I’m going to be an attentive grandmother." (In The Daily Princetonian article "Princeton’s biggest fan, Princeton’s biggest critic" by Luc Cohen, May 30, 2013.)

On explaining the thinking that led her to found a backup day-care option for Princeton employees introduced in 2007, an idea that reflected her own career management while raising two children, Tilghman said, "For years, I had said that when I retired, I would start a company that hired retired people to sit for working mothers..."

== Publications ==
Tilghman's publications as a research scientist are referenced in the Research section. Her other major publications are as follows:

- Tilghman, Shirley, et al. (1994) The Funding of Young Investigators in the Biological and Biomedical Sciences. ISBN 0-309-05077-4
- Tilghman, Shirley and National Research Council Committee on Dimensions, Causes, and Implications of Recent Trends in the Careers of Life Scientists (1998) Trends in the Careers of Life Scientists. Molecular Biology of the Cell Vol. 9, 3007–3015
- Tilghman, Shirley (1999) The Sins of the Fathers and Mothers: Genomic Imprinting in Mammalian Development. Cell Volume 96, Issue 2
- Tilghman, Shirley, et al. (2014) Rescuing US Biomedical Research from its Systemic Flaws; Proceedings of the National Academy of Sciences of America (PNAS), vol. 111, no. 16

Tilghman wrote the "President's Page" in each edition of the Princeton Alumni Weekly (the PAW) during her term as president. Electronic archives of past PAW issues are available at the magazine's website.

== Speeches ==
Tilghman delivered eleven Commencement addresses at Princeton University during her tenure as president. The text of each Princeton Commencement Address is available at the Tilghman e-Archive on the website of the office of the president at Princeton University.

She has spoken at a number of other commencement and graduation exercises, often when awarded an honorary degree.

Tilghman has often been asked to deliver commemorative speeches, sometimes known as "Remarks", give testimony, and participate in panels at other universities and notable venues, including:

- The Dehejia Lecture at the Sidwell Friends School, as the Dehejia Fellow: "Science: The Last Frontier." (2006)
- The Ullyot Public Affairs Lecture at the Chemical Heritage Foundation: "Strategy or Happenstance:Science Policy in the U.S.A."(2007)
- The Baldwin Lecture at Princeton University: "The Meaning of Race in the Post-Genome Era" (2010)
- The inauguration of Anthony Monaco as president of Tufts University (2011)
- Testimony before the U.S. Congress on Immigration and Visas

She has delivered the following additional addresses.

- Tilghman, Shirley (2005) Recruiting, Retaining and Advancing Women Scientists in Academia. Address delivered March 24 at Columbia University.

Academic offices
| Preceded by Harold Tafler Shapiro | President of Princeton University; 2001–2013 | Succeeded by Christopher L. Eisgruber |
