= Thomas J. Anton =

Thomas Julius Anton (September 28, 1934, in Worcester, Massachusetts – June 6, 2006) was an American professor of political science and dean of the faculty at Brown University. Anton was well known for his studies on federalism, particularly through his book, American Federalism and Public Policy, which was awarded the Gladys M. Kammerer Award for its description of the "real politic approach" to federalism.

Anton graduated 1956 from Clark University. He was awarded a Doctor of Philosophy in politics at Princeton.

In 1967 he was awarded a Guggenheim Fellowship.

== Select bibliography ==
- Thomas Julius Anton (1975). Governing Greater Stockholm: A Study of Policy Development and System Change. Berkeley: University of California Press. ISBN 0-520-02718-3.
