= Teodoro Valcárcel =

Peruvian composer (1900–1942)

Teodoro Valcárcel (17 October 1900 – 20 March 1942) was a Peruvian classical composer.

Born in Puno, Valcárcel studied at the Milan Conservatory, and was a pupil in Barcelona of Felipe Pedrell. He returned in 1920 to his native country, settling in Lima. Eight years later, he won a national prize in composition, at the same time receiving a gold medal from the government of Lima for his efforts in the study of local folk music. He returned to Europe in 1929, and the following year a concert consisting entirely of his music was heard in Paris. Valcárcel was a mestizo, and his music features Andean elements heavily. He published a number of collections of folk songs; original works include two ballets, a violin concerto, a variety of other orchestral pieces, and several chamber works; he also composed 3 ensayos for an ensemble of indigenous instruments. Valcárcel died in Lima. He was the uncle of composer Edgar Valcárcel.
