= David Kaser =

American librarian and educator (1924– 2017)

David Edwin Kaser (March 12, 1924 – March 24, 2017) was a book historian, library administrator, educator, author, and international consultant.

== Education and career ==
Kaser was born March 12, 1924, in Mishawaka, Indiana. He served in the United States Army during World War II and was in combat in the European Theater, specifically in France and Germany and assigned to a tank battalion.

Kaser earned an A.B. in English from Houghton College in 1947 graduating Phi Beta Kappa. He then earned a master's degree in English from the University of Notre Dame, and an AMLS and Ph.D. in library science from the University of Michigan.

From 1952 to 1954, Kaser served as serials librarian at Ball State University. From 1956 to 1959 he was assistant director for technical services at Washington University in St. Louis

He was director of the Joint University Libraries (now Vanderbilt University Libraries) in Nashville, Tennessee from 1960 to 1968.

In 1968, Kaser was appointed Director of Libraries at Cornell University where he introduced computer-based systems and the libraries began contributing records to OCLC.

Kaser was appointed professor in the Graduate Library School at Indiana University Bloomington in 1973. While there he supervised nearly fifty doctoral dissertations. He retired in 1991 as Distinguished Professor Emeritus.

== Professional Activity ==
Kaser was active in the Association of College and Research Libraries. He served as editor of the association journal, College & Research Libraries, from 1963 to 1969 and was elected president for 1968 - 1969.

He served on the American Library Association Council in 1965–1969 and 1975–1979.

He was President of Beta Phi Mu, the library and information science honor society, in 1975.

In 1990 the Library History Round Table of the American Library Association dedicated the Seminar, "Reading & Libraries," to Kaser.

== Consulting ==
Kaser engaged extensively in international library development. He consulted on library-related matters across four continents.

His consulting practice centered heavily on academic library facilities. He served as a consultant on the design or renovation of more than 220 college and university library buildings.

David Edwin Kaser died March 24, 2017, in Bloomington, Indiana.

== Selected Publications ==
- Kaser, David (1957). Messrs. Carey & Lea of Philadelphia: A Study in the History of the Booktrade. Philadelphia: University of Pennsylvania Press.
- Kaser, David (1963). Joseph Charless: Printer in the Western Country. Philadelphia: University of Pennsylvania Press.
- Kaser, David, ed. (1966). Books in America's Past: Essays Honoring Rudolph H. Gjelsness. Charlottesville: Published for the Bibliographical Society of the University of Virginia by the University Press of Virginia.
- Kaser, David (1976). "A Century of Academic Librarianship as Reflected in the Literature". College & Research Libraries. 37 (2): 110–27.
- Kaser, David (1980). A Book for a Sixpence: The Circulating Library in America. Pittsburgh: Beta Phi Mu.
- Kaser, David (1984). Books and Libraries in Camp and Battle: The Civil War Experience. Westport, CT: Greenwood Press.
- Kaser, David (1987). "19th-Century Academic Library Buildings". College & Research Libraries News. 48 (8): 476–80.
- Kaser, David (1997). The Evolution of the American Academic Library Building. Lanham, MD: Scarecrow Press.
- Kaser, David (2000). Just Lucky, I Guess: My Adventurous Life as a Hoosier Librarian. New York: Vantage Press.
