= Patricia Tobacco Forrester =

American painter

- Born: Patricia Ann Tobacco; September 17, 1940; Northampton, Massachusetts
- Died: March 16, 2011 (aged 70); Washington, D.C.
- Known for: Painting
- Awards: Guggenheim Fellowship for Creative Arts (1967)

Patricia Tobacco Forrester (September 17, 1940 Northampton, Massachusetts – March 16, 2011 Washington, D.C.) was an American watercolorist.

== Life ==
She graduated from Smith College with a B.A. (Phi Beta Kappa) in 1962 where she studied with Leonard Baskin, and from Yale University with a B.F.A. in 1963, and M.F.A. in 1965, where she studied with Chuck Close and Janet Fish.

She was a Guggenheim Fellow in 1967. In 1992 she was elected into the National Academy of Design as an Associate member, and became a full Academician in 1994. She won a 2005 and 2009 Artist Grant from the DC Commission on Arts and Humanities.

Her works are in the Corcoran Gallery of Art, the Smithsonian American Art Museum, the Brooklyn Museum, the Art Institute of Chicago, British Museum and the National Museum of Women in the Arts.

She lived from the sixties to 1981 in San Francisco, and moved to Washington, D.C., in 1982. She was married to Alex Forrester and Paul Ekman.

Forrester died in Washington, D.C., on March 16, 2011.
