= Mary Helen Rasmussen =

American Musicologist, writer and editor

Mary Helen Rasmussen (December 21, 1930 – January 26, 2008) was an American musicologist, writer and editor.

The daughter of Edwin and Florence Rasmussen, she was born in Dover, New Hampshire and received a BMus from the University of New Hampshire in 1952 and a MMus in low brass performance in 1953 and a MLS in 1965 from the University of Illinois. For two years, Rasmussen taught public school in Gorham, New Hampshire. She was a music professor at the University of New Hampshire from 1968 to 1997, when she was named Professor emerita.

She received a Fulbright award and grants from the Ford and Guggenheim Foundations. In 1998, she received the Christopher Monk Award from the Historic Brass Society.

She established the journal Brass Quarterly in 1957, serving as its editor and publisher until it ceased publication in 1965. She was later editor and publisher for its successor Brass and Woodwind Quarterly, which appeared from 1967 to 1969.

Her books included:

- A Teacher's Guide to the Literature of Brass Instruments (1964)
- A Teacher's Guide to the Literature of Woodwind Instruments (1966)

Rasmussen also published articles on music subjects in various academic journals and critical reviews.

She played the tuba and trombone as well as the cello and viola da gamba.

Rasmussen died in Durham, New Hampshire at the age of 77 from cancer.
