= Christopher L. Eisgruber =

President of Princeton University (born 1961)

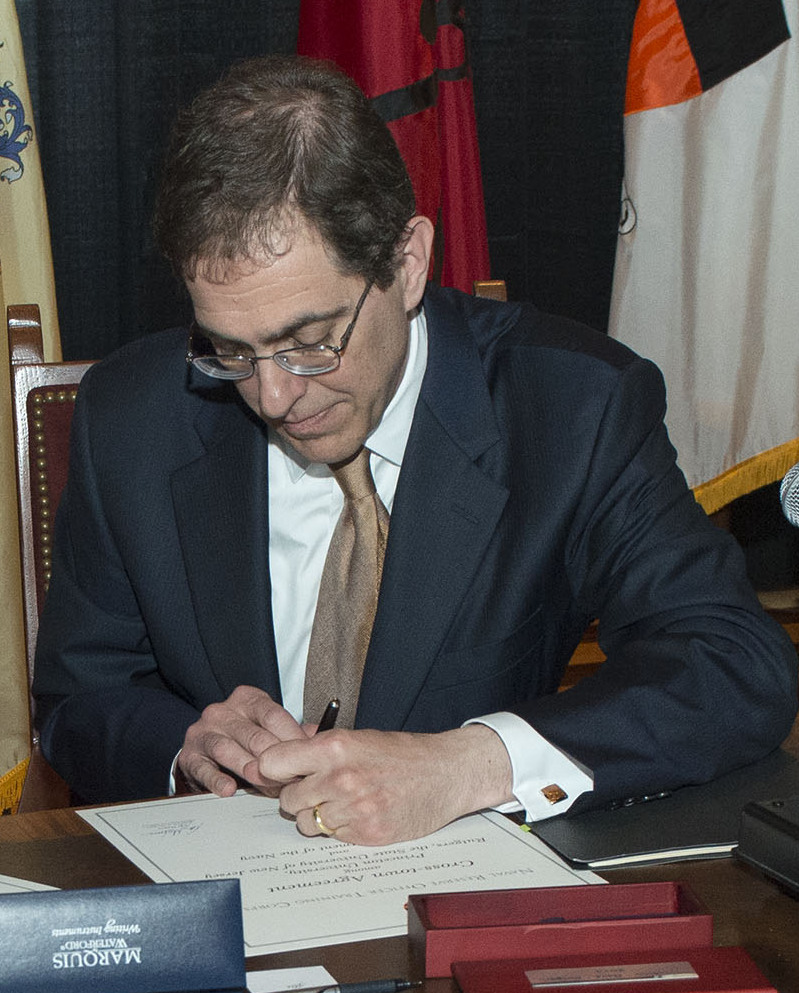
- Eisgruber in April 2014

20th President of Princeton University
- Incumbent
- Assumed office July 1, 2013
- Preceded by: Shirley M. Tilghman

Personal details
- Born: Christopher Ludwig Eisgruber; September 24, 1961 (age 64) Lafayette, Indiana, U.S.
- Spouse: Lori Martin
- Children: Danny
- Education: Princeton University (BA); University College, Oxford (MLitt); University of Chicago (JD)

Christopher Ludwig Eisgruber (born September 24, 1961) is an American academic and legal scholar and the 20th president of Princeton University, where he is also the Laurance S. Rockefeller Professor of Public Affairs in the Princeton School of Public and International Affairs and the University Center for Human Values. He is also an expert on constitutional law, with an emphasis on separation of church and state and federal judicial appointments.

== Education ==
Eisgruber graduated magna cum laude from Princeton University in 1983, receiving a Bachelor of Arts in physics and was inducted into Phi Beta Kappa. He completed his senior thesis, titled "The global implications of local violations of the energy conditions", under the supervision of Malcolm Perry; his thesis addressed topics in the theory of general relativity. He also studied political theory with Jeffrey K. Tulis and constitutional interpretation with Walter F. Murphy, (the latter would inspire Eisgruber to pursue a career in constitutional law). During his junior year at Princeton, he was a member of the Elm Club. After graduating from Princeton, Eisgruber won a Rhodes Scholarship to attend University College, Oxford, where he earned a M.Litt. in politics in 1987. Upon his return from Oxford, Eisgruber attended the University of Chicago Law School, where he graduated cum laude with a J.D. in 1988. While in law school, he served as editor-in-chief of the University of Chicago Law Review.

== Career ==
Following his graduation from law school, Eisgruber served as law clerk to Judge Patrick Higginbotham of the United States Court of Appeals for the Fifth Circuit and then Justice John Paul Stevens of the Supreme Court of the United States.

After clerking, Eisgruber taught at New York University Law School for eleven years, from 1990 to 2001, before coming to Princeton. From 2001 to 2004, Eisgruber was the director of Princeton's Program in Law and Public Affairs. He served as the provost of Princeton from 2004 to 2013.

Eisgruber has served on several boards, including the academic advisory board of Coursera, a provider of massive open online courses; the Board of Trustees of the Educational Testing Service; the Board of Trustees of Princeton University Press; the Board of Trustees of ITHAKA and Artstor; and the Board of Directors of Liulishuo. He is also a steering committee member of the American Talent Initiative and a member of the Global University Leaders Forum of the World Economic Forum.

Eisgruber was elected as a member of the American Academy of Arts and Sciences in 2014.

== President of Princeton University ==
Eisgruber was named as Princeton's 20th president on April 21, 2013, and assumed the office on July 1, 2013. A formal installation ceremony was held on September 22, 2013.

Eisgruber is the first Princeton president who received his undergraduate degree from the university since Robert Goheen, who served from 1957 to 1972. He is also the first president since Francis Landey Patton, president from 1888 to 1902, who does not hold a PhD.

== Personal life ==
Eisgruber is a native of Lafayette, Indiana. Both his parents were German immigrants who met as graduate students at Purdue University. Eisgruber moved to Oregon with his family in 1973. His father was the dean of the School of Agricultural Sciences at Oregon State University.

Eisgruber captained the 1979 U.S. National High School Chess Champion team in his senior year at Corvallis High School

His wife, Lori A. Martin, is a partner in the New York office of the law firm WilmerHale, and they have a son, Danny, who is a graduate of the University of Chicago.

Eisgruber was raised Catholic and married his wife in an Episcopal church. While helping his son, then in the fourth grade, with a school project, he discovered that his Berlin-born mother, who had arrived in New York as an eight-year-old refugee, was Jewish. Today, Eisgruber identifies as a nontheist Jew. His wife is Episcopalian. In 2009, a Holocaust claims tribunal awarded Eisgruber and his three sisters 162,500 Swiss francs, representing the value of the bank account of their maternal great-grandfather, Salomon Kalisch.

Eisgruber is a lifelong fan of the Chicago Cubs.

== Publications ==
Books

- Terms of Respect: How Colleges Get Free Speech Right (2025)
- The Next Justice: Repairing the Supreme Court Appointments Process (2007)
- Religious Freedom and the Constitution, with Lawrence G. Sager (2007)
- Global Justice and the Bulwarks of Localism: Human Rights in Context, ed. with Andras Sajo (2005)
- Constitutional Self-Government (2001)

Letters

- Letter to U.S. Senate Committee on the Judiciary

== See also ==
- List of law clerks for the fourth seat of the Supreme Court of the United States

Academic offices
Preceded by Shirley M. Tilghman	20th President of Princeton University; 2013–present	Incumbent
Preceded by Amy Gutmann	Provost of Princeton University; 2004–2013	Succeeded by David S. Lee
