= Butler College =

Residential college at Princeton University

- Residential college
- Princeton University
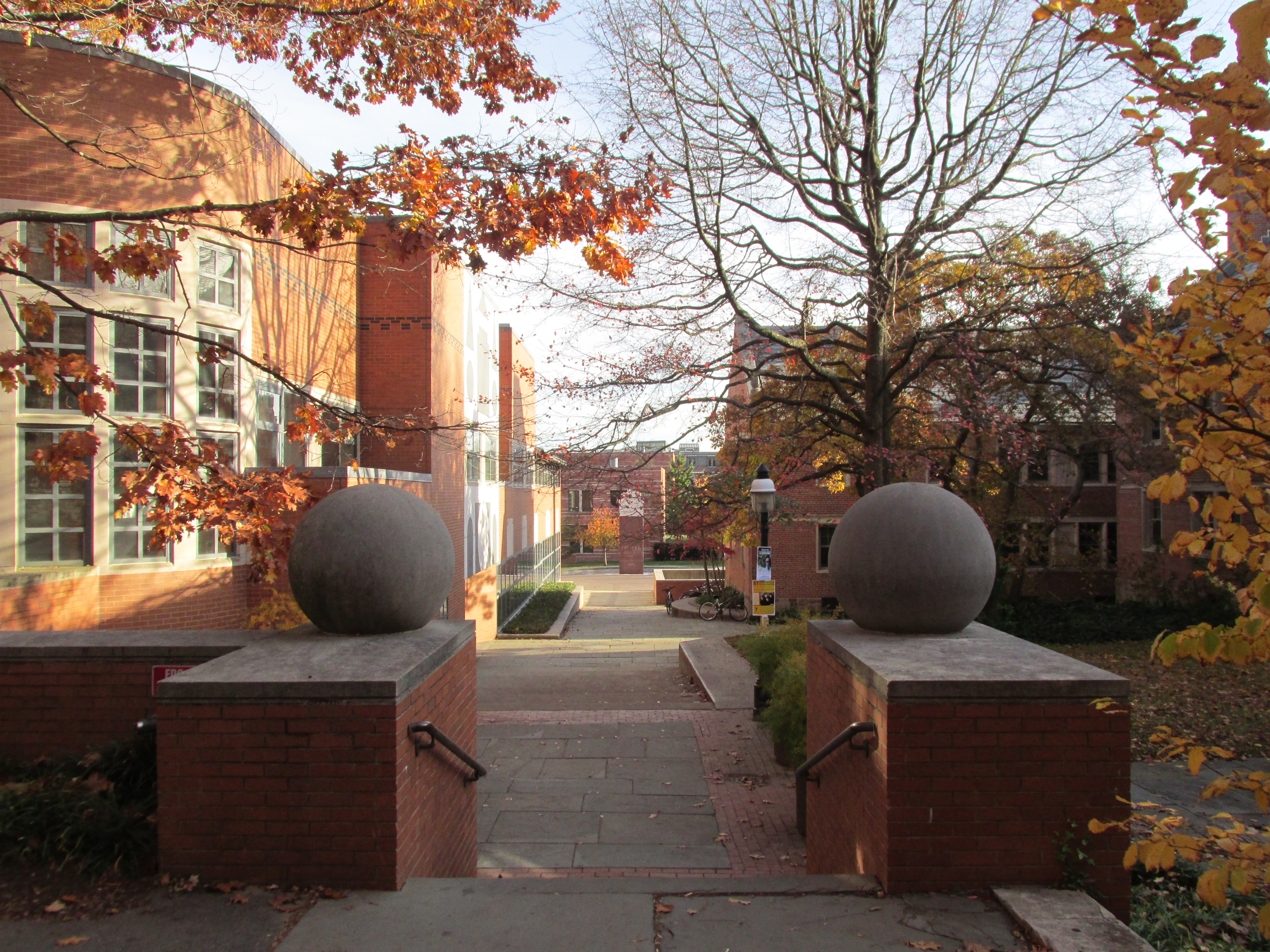
- College entrance

- Location: Princeton, New Jersey
- Coordinates: 40°20′41″N 74°39′23″W
- Full name: Lee D. Butler College
- Established: September 25, 1983
- Named for: Lee D. Butler
- Status: Open
- Gender: Mixed
- Sister college: Hobson College
- Head: Elizabeth M. Armstrong
- Dean: Rashidah Andrews
- Website: butlercollege.princeton.edu
- JCR: Yoseloff Hall; Bogle Hall; 1976 Hall
- SCR: Wilf Hall

Map
- Location within Mercer County, New Jersey Location within New Jersey

Lee D. Butler College is one of the seven residential colleges of Princeton University, founded in 1983. It houses about 500 freshmen and sophomores, 100 juniors and seniors, 10 Resident Graduate Students, a faculty member in residence, as well as a small number of upperclass Residential College Advisors. Butler is a four-year college, paired with the former First College. This means juniors and seniors are permitted to live in Butler, with priority for housing given to undergraduates who spent their first two years in either Butler or First.

It was opened in 1983 as Lee D. Butler College, the fourth college to be founded, and named after benefactor Lee D. Butler (class of 1922).

As of the fall of 2009, Butler's main quad consists of newly constructed dormitories. These new constructed dormitories were designed by Pei Cobb Freed & Partners Architects LLP and structurally engineered by Leslie E. Robertson Associates. These dorms replaced a set of older dormitories, formerly known collectively as the "New New Quad", built in the 1960s and demolished in 2007. The dormitories now comprising Butler are 1915 Hall, 1967 Hall, 1976 Hall, Bloomberg Hall, Bogle Hall, Wilf Hall, and Yoseloff Hall. 1915 Hall is an older building, while Bloomberg Hall opened in 2004 and the other dormitories opened in 2009. As part of the construction of Hobson College, 1915 Hall is scheduled to be demolished in the summer of 2022.

The dining hall of the college was Gordon Wu Hall, which was renovated during the summer of 2009 along with the adjacent First College dining hall, Wilcox Hall. As a result of this renovation, Wu and Wilcox shared a servery and kitchen, with separate dining areas. This arrangement is the same as that used by the Rockefeller College and Mathey College dining halls, which were renovated in 2007. In 2022, with the demolition of First College, Wilcox Hall closed, as did Wu Hall in 2023. Butler College's official dining hall is now Whitman College's, though students often tend to also eat at the shared New College West-Yeh College Choi Dining Hall, or the dining hall at the campus Center for Jewish Life.
