= Forbes College =

Residential college at Princeton University

- Residential college
- Princeton University
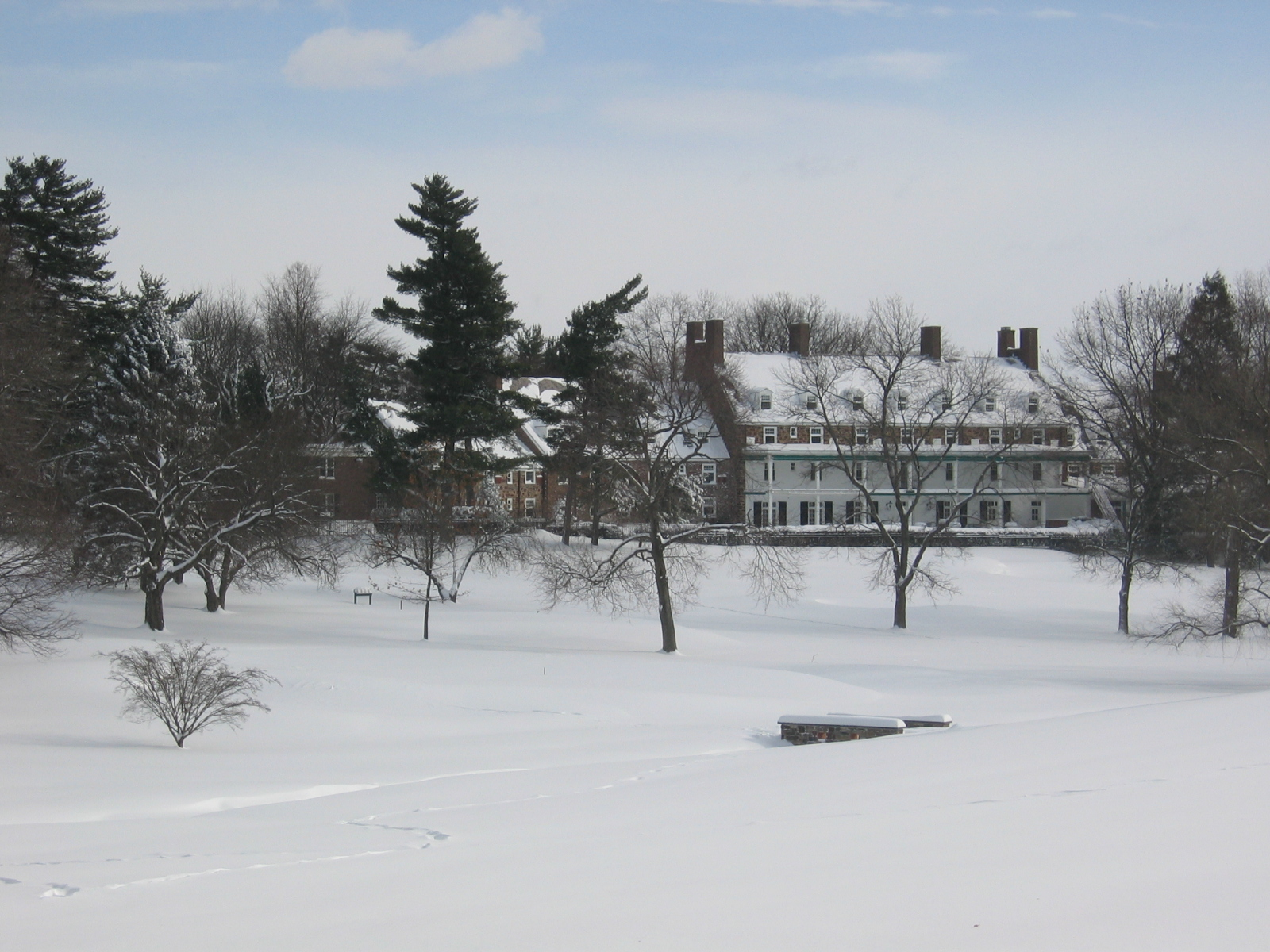
- Forbes College from College Road West

- Coordinates: 40.3421°N 74.6612°W
- Full name: Malcolm S. Forbes Jr. '70 College
- Established: 1984
- Named for: Steve Forbes
- Architect: Andrew Jackson Thomas
- Head: Maria Garlock
- Dean: Patrick Caddeau
- Website: forbescollege.princeton.edu

The Malcolm S. Forbes Jr. '70 College is one of the seven residential colleges that house all freshmen and sophomores at Princeton University. One of the two first residential colleges at Princeton (along with Mathey College), it was originally called Princeton Inn College after the former hotel where it is housed. Following a gift to the school by Malcolm S. Forbes Sr. '41 in 1984 in honor of his son, Steve, the college was renamed Forbes. Steve's daughter, Catherine Forbes '99, was a member of Forbes College while attending Princeton.

== Buildings ==
The college consists of two main parts, each with a subsection: The Main Inn and its subsidiary New Wing, and the Addition, with its Annex. In addition, a two-story house adjacent to Forbes, 99 Alexander Street (nicknamed "the Pink House"), houses up to 10 juniors per year. The Main Inn and its New Wing were originally part of The Princeton Inn, a hotel with a colonial fieldstone style. The hotel was built by the architect Andrew Jackson Thomas in 1923–1924. It was a popular among parents visiting their sons (and young ladies visiting students at the all-male university). The New Wing was added in 1946, built of red brick. To the south of the main building, is the Annex with additional housing. The hotel was acquired by the university in 1970, and the Addition (designed by J. Robert Hillier '59) was built connecting the Annex and the Main Inn. From 1970 to 1983 the hotel was called the Princeton Inn College, which cultivated a unique campus culture; residents were called "Innmates" and T-shirts with the slogan "Die For the INN" (an intramural sports battle cry) still remain in circulation. Forbes is also said to foster a more close-knit community and social life, because of its unique set up. The Forbes College Addition includes a single-sex floor, one of only two in the Princeton University residential colleges.

Forbes has some excellent amenities. These include private bathrooms for many of the suites (for rooms in the former hotel portions, plus a few in the Addition), and a dining hall, library, theater, and café that can be reached without ever going outdoors. The dining hall was noted for outstanding Sunday brunch. Forbes is also close to the late-night snack mecca, Wawa ("the Wa").

== Affiliations ==
Prior to 2023, Forbes was a two-year college, paired with nearby Whitman College. Only first- and second-year students (with the exception of several upperclass Residential College Advisors) lived in Forbes. Forbesians who wished to live in a residential college past their sophomore year may have moved into one of the three four-year colleges, Whitman, Mathey, or Butler. Since Forbes is paired with Whitman College, priority for housing in Whitman is given to students who spent their first two years living in Forbes or Whitman. Therefore, although it is possible for a Forbesian to move into any of the three four-year colleges after sophomore year, it is most advantageous for them to move into Whitman.

Starting in 2023, all residential colleges became four-year colleges.

== Life at Forbes ==
=== Activities and events ===
Forbes College hosts a diverse range of intellectual, social, and cultural events.

Over dinner, about two to three times a semester, invited guests speak to Forbes residents about their travels, their work or research, their latest publication, or simply provoke with some unconventional ideas.

Friday afternoons at 4:00 p.m., the College Office staff invite students to join them for tea and pastries and some informal conversation on just about anything.

The Music Society encourages performances by student artists and brings a number of music related events to Forbes each year. Performers have included instrumentalists, singers, chamber groups, the University Chamber Orchestra, the Jazz Ensemble, folk singers, and classical ensembles.

Forbes College participates vigorously in the university's program of intramural sports, and has been the residential college champion 11 out of 22 years. Men's, women's, and co-ed teams are formed in many different sports. Forbes finished this past year with a significant lead.

The Forbes Film Society (FFS) hosts regular film screenings, discussions, and lectures related to cinema. Members of the Forbes community are encouraged to join the FFS and participate in organizing screening schedules, to work as projectionists, and to share in the pleasure of watching and discussing a good movie in the company of friends.

=== Facilities ===
Forbes College facilities include a TV lounge, a large and a small dining room, a multi-purpose room, a seminar room, music practice rooms, a black box theater, an art and ceramics studio, a dance studio, a library, study rooms, a cafe, a multi-media lab, a darkroom, game room, and an organic garden.

The Norman Thomas 1905 Library at Forbes College contains a general collection, reference books and periodicals, as well as an extensive science fiction collection.

=== College Council ===
The Forbes College Council (FCC) consists of twelve to fifteen representatives of the student body. The Council organizes and coordinates College activities, which include social and cultural events, trips, and films, and makes proposals on the allocation of student activities funds. The weekly meetings are open to any Forbesian. The FCC works hand in hand with the College Office to plan events.
