= Millan House =

Historic co-op in Manhattan, New York

Coordinates: 40.768007°N 73.964979°W

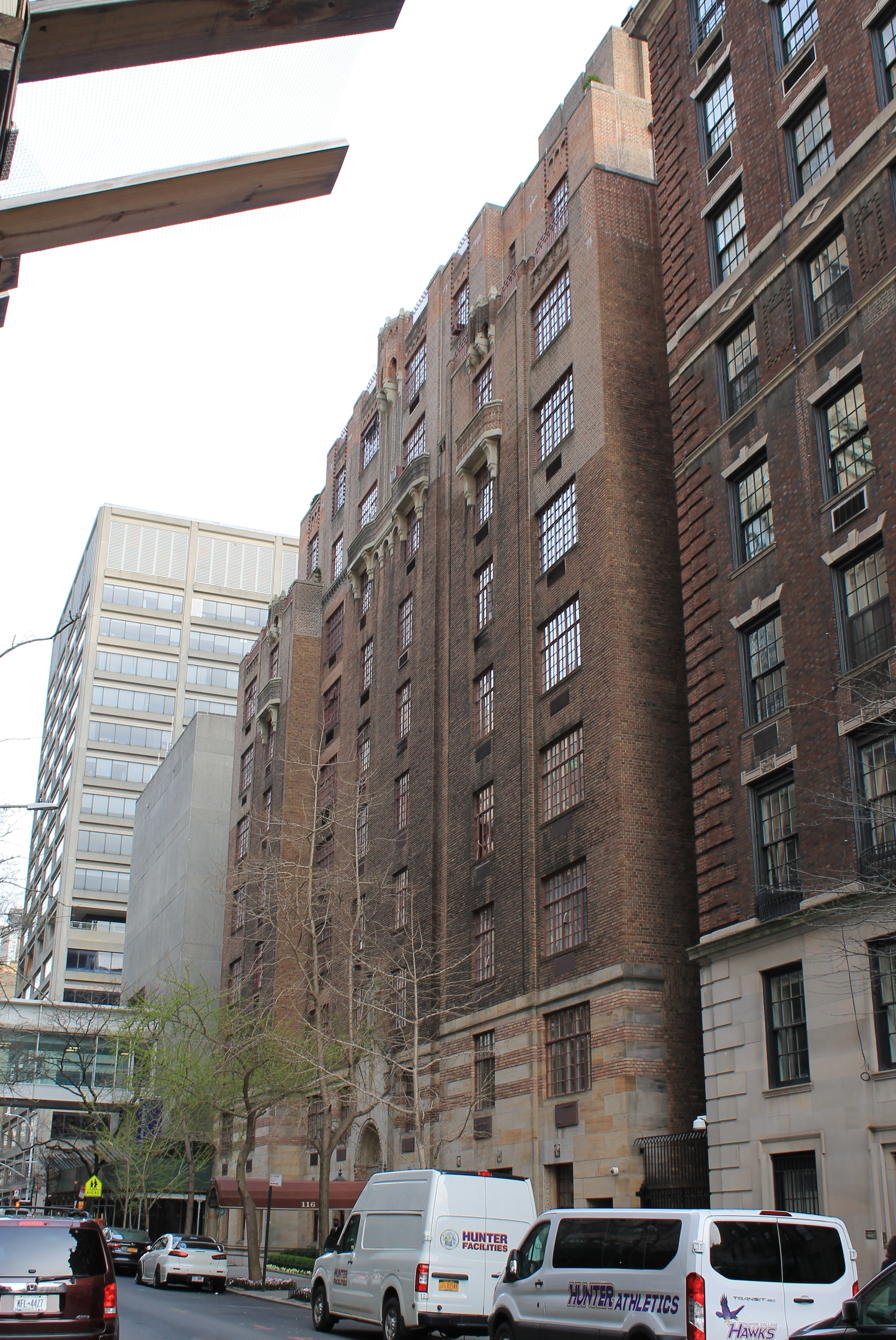
- 116 East 68th Street facade
- Interactive map of the Millan House area

General information
- Location: Lenox Hill, Manhattan, New York City, U.S.
- Construction started: 1930
- Completed: 1931

Technical details
- Floor count: 11

Design and construction
- Architect: Andrew J. Thomas

Millan House is a historic co-op in Lenox Hill on the Upper East Side of Manhattan in New York City. The co-op is made up of two buildings located at 115 East 67th Street and 116 East 68th Street, with 57 apartments in total. They are connected by "a formal back garden". The buildings are contributing properties to the Upper East Side Historic District.

The land was given to the Baptist Church shortly after the American Civil War. By 1929, John D. Rockefeller Jr. purchased the land from the church for US$1 million. He hired architect Andrew J. Thomas to design the building. Construction began in 1930. It was completed in 1931.

Early tenants included Simon Flexner, Herbert L. Pratt Jr. (the son of Herbert L. Pratt) and Witherbee Black (of the family silversmith firm Black, Starr & Frost-Gorham). By 1947, tenant J. W. Boardman Milligan insisted upon turning the rent-only building into a co-op. Later, Frank K. Houston, the chairman and chief executive officer of the Chemical Bank, lived here until his death in 1973.
