= Frank K. Houston =

American banker and philanthropist

- Born: Frank Kittrell Houston; July 4, 1881; Woodbury, Cannon County, Tennessee, U.S.
- Died: October 19, 1973 (aged 92); New York City, U.S.
- Education: Vanderbilt University
- Occupation: Banking executive
- Spouse: Florence Houston
- Parent: William C. Houston

Frank K. Houston (July 4, 1881 – October 19, 1973) was an American banker and philanthropist. Born on a Southern plantation in Tennessee, he was a banking executive in Nashville, Tennessee, and St. Louis, Missouri, in the 1900s-1910s. He joined the Chemical Corn Exchange Bank in New York City in 1920, and served as its president from 1935 to 1945, and as its chairman and chief executive officer from 1945 to 1947.

== Early life ==
Frank K. Houston was born on July 4, 1881, on his family plantation in Woodbury, Tennessee. His father, William C. Houston, was a Democratic politician. On his paternal side, he was related to Sam Houston.

Houston grew up on the Beaver Dam Plantation. He graduated from Vanderbilt University in 1904. While in college, he served as the president of the Sigma Alpha Epsilon chapter.

== Career ==
Houston was elected the secretary of the Tennessee Bankers Association in 1905. Three years later, in 1908, he was elected as the president of the Nashville chapter of the American Institute of Banking.

Houston served as the first assistant cashier of the First National Bank in Nashville, Tennessee, from 1909 to 1912, when he was appointed as the Vice President of Third National Bank in St. Louis, Missouri. In 1920, he was appointed as vice president of the Chemical Corn Exchange Bank in New York City. He served as its president from 1935 to 1945, and as its chairman and chief executive officer from 1945 to 1947.

Houston served as the president of Bankers Club of America. He also served on the board of directors of the Waldorf Astoria New York.

== Philanthropy ==
Houston served as a member and treasurer of the board of directors of the Thomas Jefferson Foundation, which manages Monticello, Thomas Jefferson's plantation, from 1933 to 1943. He served as its vice president from 1943 to 1944, as its president from 1944 to 1958, and as its chairman from 1958 to 1969. He also served as the chairman of the Cordell Hull Foundation, named for Cordell Hull, who served as the 47th Secretary of State from 1933 to 1944.

Houston served on the Board of Trust of his alma mater, Vanderbilt University. In 1969, Houston made a charitable donation to the Graduate School of Management to endow a professorship in banking.

== Personal life ==
Houston had a wife, Florence. They resided at Millan House, a co-op located at 116 East 68th Street in Lenox Hill on the Upper East Side of Manhattan.

== Death ==
Houston died at the age of 91 in Roosevelt Hospital, New York City, on October 19, 1973.
