= Queensboro Corporation =

- Industry: Housing
- Founded: Queens, New York, United States (August 12, 1909)
- Founder: Edward A. MacDougall
- Headquarters: Queens, New York, United States

The Queensboro Corporation was a real estate company founded by Edward A. MacDougall that played a major role in developing the Jackson Heights area of Queens, New York City.

== Early years ==
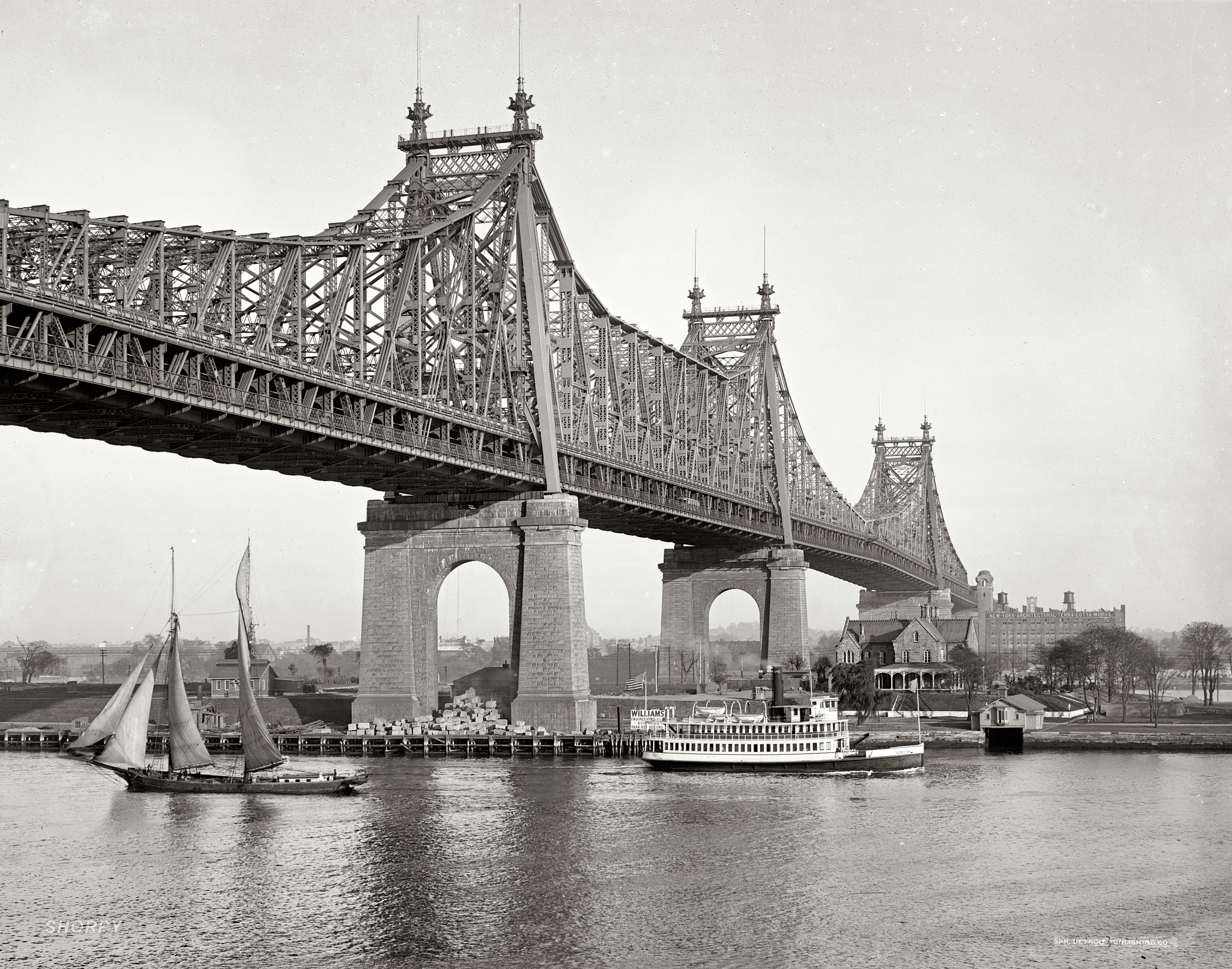
Queensboro Bridge in 1910, linking Jackson Heights to Manhattan

The Queensboro Corporation was formed by a group of investors from New York headed by Edward A. MacDougall. The corporation was founded on August 12, 1909, with the purpose of developing the area that was then called Trains Meadow. The first land purchase of 128 acres (52 ha) was completed in 1910, and the corporation had bought about 350 acres (140 ha) by 1914. MacDougall renamed the area Jackson Heights, after Jackson Avenue (now Northern Boulevard), the main east–west road at the time. There were no prominent "heights" in the area, but the word was presumably chosen to denote social exclusivity. At first the area could most easily be reached via a ferry from Manhattan. The Queensboro Bridge opened in 1909, making the area more accessible.

The corporation started to energetically exploit the potential of the property. MacDougall's corporation went well beyond simply erecting buildings. It planned the community, divided the land into blocks and building lots, and installed streets, sidewalks, power, water and sewage. By 1912, 8 miles (13 km) of paved roads had been built with sidewalks, curbs and gutters, and there were 5 miles (8.0 km) of sewers. The elevated IRT Flushing Line reached Jackson Heights in 1917, reducing the travel time to Manhattan to twenty minutes. There were four stations in Jackson Heights at 74th Street, 82nd Street, Elmhurst Avenue, and Junction Boulevard. In 1922, prompted by the Queensboro Corporation, the Fifth Avenue Coach Company launched a direct service of double-decker coaches to Jackson Heights.

The target customers for the Queensboro Corporation were middle class residents of New York who could afford to live in the suburbs. In 1914 the Queensboro Corporation directors inspected new housing developments in several European cities. These probably included the garden apartment projects at Charlottenburg, Berlin, built between 1904 and 1909, that Erich Kohn and Paul Mebes had designed for the Berlin Civil Servants Dwelling Association. The housing developments at Jackson Heights closely resemble the Charlottenberg developments. In contrast to traditional suburbs of single-family houses, the Queensboro corporation decided to build upscale apartment buildings distinguished by shared garden spaces. The apartments were of high quality with ornate exteriors and features such as fireplaces, parquet floors, sun rooms and built-in bathtubs with showers. The apartments, or "homes", were sold rather than rented under what was first called a "collective ownership plan". This was later changed to "cooperative ownership", probably because the first name had connotations of socialism.

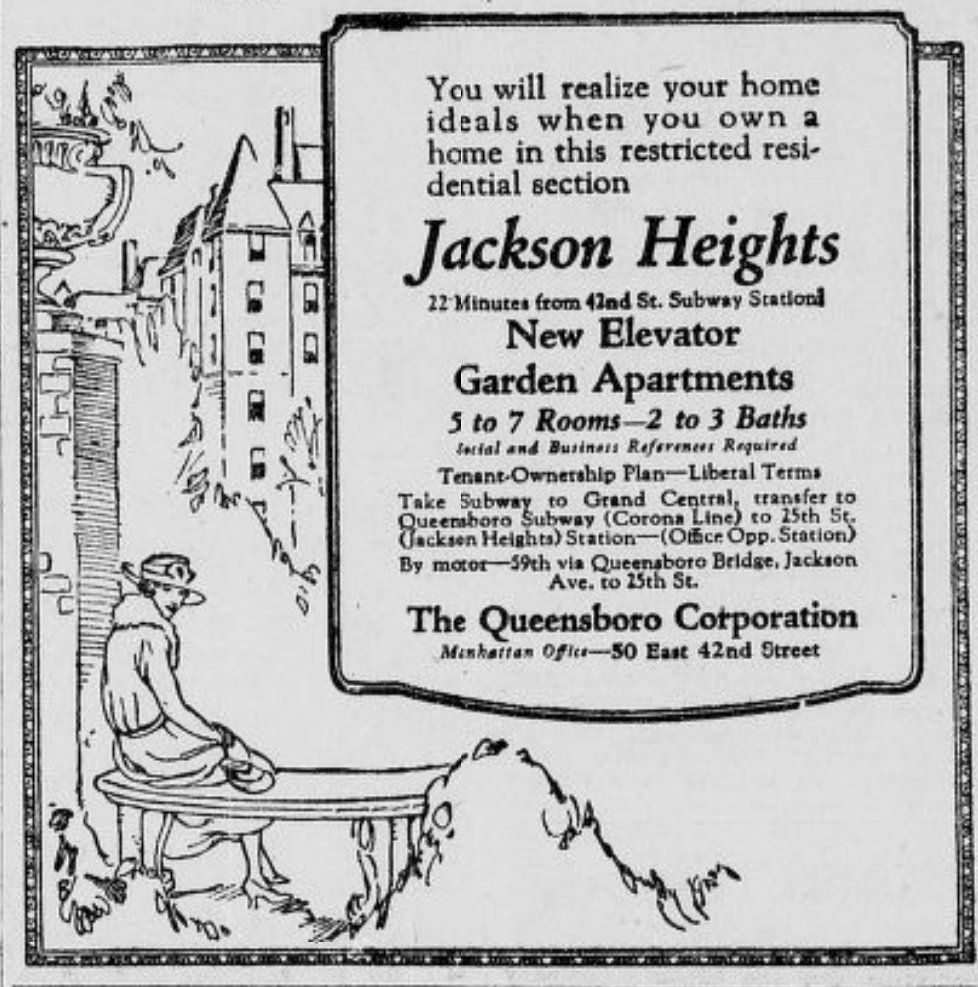
Jackson Heights Advertisement by The Queensboro Corporation

During the years that followed, the interests of the Jackson Heights community and the Queensboro Corporation were closely intertwined. The local newspaper sometimes sounded like the voice of the corporation. The corporation encouraged development of the commercial area that surrounded the 82nd Street subway station, and assisted in setting up a community board to ensure the growth of civic institutions. MacDougall also donated land for churches. Part of the model in the early years, which broke down with the Great Depression of the 1930s, was "a policy of reasonable restriction in accepting tenants thus bringing together tenants having ideals and living standards in common." In plain English, this meant that Jews, Blacks, and perhaps Greeks and Italians were excluded from the community. Only white Anglo-Saxon Protestants were welcome.

== Garden apartments ==
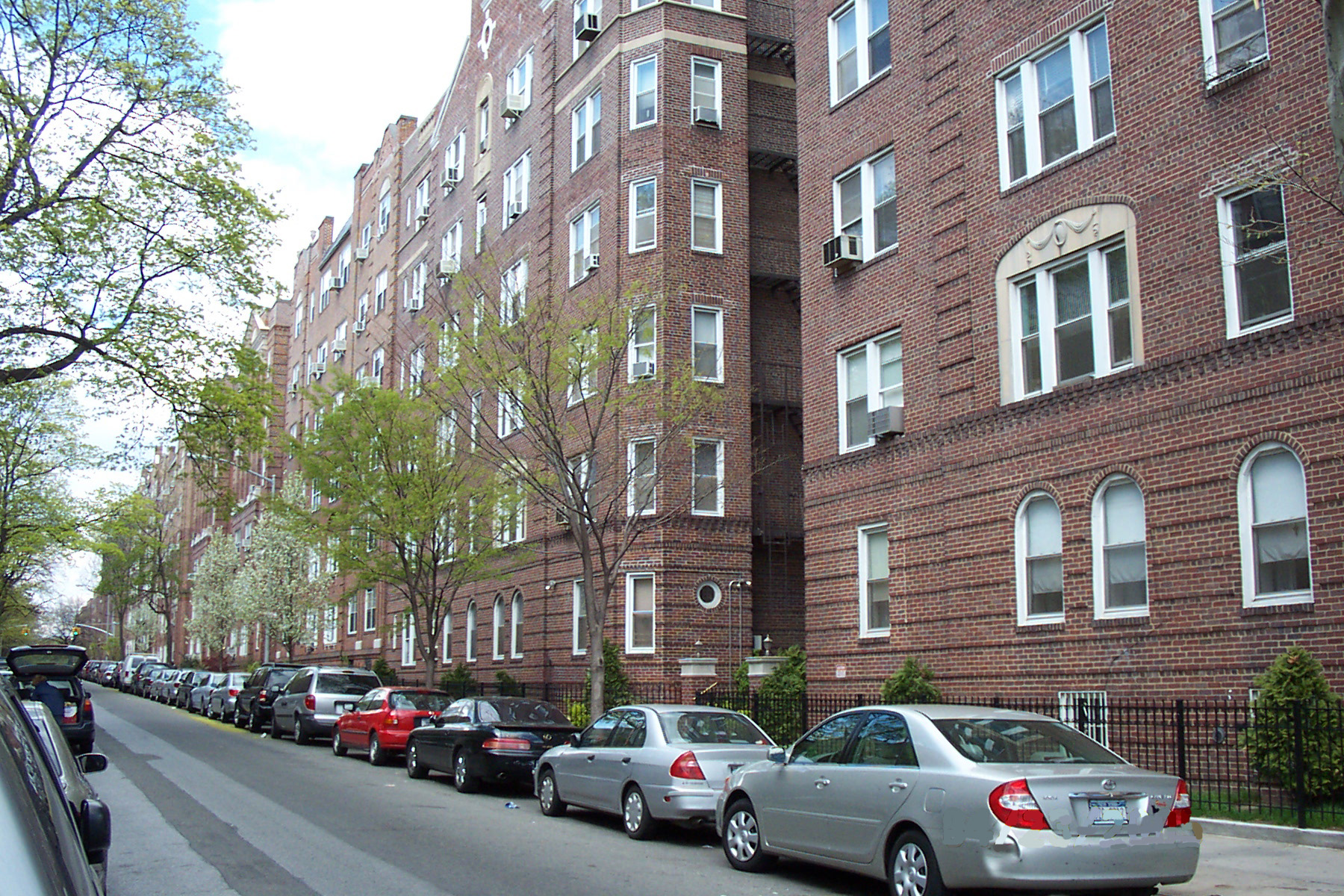
Typical residential street in Jackson Heights

The Laurel apartment building on 82nd Street at Northern Boulevard was the first of the Queensboro Corporation buildings in Jackson Heights, completed in 1914. The building included a small courtyard. The Greystones on 80th Street between 35th and 37th Avenues were completed in 1918. The architect George H. Wells designed the Greystones, for which the Queensboro Corporation coined the name "garden apartment" to convey the concept of apartments surrounded by a green environment. With abundant land available, all unused space was used for parks and gardens, or for recreational areas that included a golf course. This was used in initial marketing efforts, although later much of the land was built upon. In 1919 the Corporation introduced the concept of cooperative ownership to strengthen the sense of community.

On August 28, 1922, the Queensboro Corporation paid $50 to the WEAF radio station to broadcast a ten-minute sales pitch for apartments in Jackson Heights. This may have been the first "infomercial", opening with a few words about Nathaniel Hawthorne before promoting the corporation's Nathaniel Hawthorne apartments. Mr. Blackwell of the Queensboro Corporation then urged his audience to:

seek the recreation and the daily comfort of the home removed from the congested part of the city, right at the boundaries of God's great outdoors, and within a few minutes by subway from the business section of Manhattan ... The cry of the heart is for more living room, more chance to unfold, more opportunity to get near Mother Earth, to play, to romp, to plant and to dig ... Let me enjoin upon you as you value your health and your hopes and your home happiness, get away from the solid masses of brick ... where your children grow up starved for a run over a patch of grass and the sight of a tree...

The Queensboro Corporation employed the well known architect Andrew J. Thomas, already an advocate of garden apartments. Some of Thomas' most important work was undertaken for the corporation. The first example was the Linden Court complex, in the block formed by 84th and 85th Streets and 37th and Roosevelt Avenues. The buildings in this complex are in attached pairs around the perimeter of a shared open space holding a landscaped garden, with gaps at regular intervals in the perimeter wall. The layout provides light and ventilation to the apartments, and fosters a sense of belonging to a community. Linden Court was the first development to include parking spaces, with single-story garages accessed via narrow driveways.

Thomas built variants on the Linden Court design aimed at upper-middle income customers with the Château and Towers projects. Sold as cooperatives, both of these 34th Avenue developments had large, airy apartments and were served by elevators. The elegant Château cooperative apartment complex was built in French Renaissance style. The twelve buildings surround a large common garden. They have slate mansard roofs pierced by dormer windows, and diaperwork brick walls. The early gardens were designed only to be looked at. As the concept of the garden apartment evolved, and the garden areas became relatively larger compared to the built areas, the design of the shared gardens began to include paved spaces where people could meet or sit. In 1924 the Queensboro Corporation started the Ivy Court, Cedar Court, and Spanish Gardens projects, all designed by Thomas.

== Later developments ==
In the mid-1920s the Queensboro Corporation also built attached and semi-detached homes for single families, with brick facades in American Colonial or English Tudor styles.

In response to the ten-year Depression that followed the Wall Street Crash of 1929, the corporation tried to rationalize private enterprise through the Jackson Heights Merchant Association, and to spin off responsibility for maintaining infrastructure to the private sector. Formerly exclusive apartment buildings were opened to lower income groups, with apartments divided into smaller units and rooms rented. Jackson Heights lost its exclusive character, and would not regain it.

After a severe drop in property values in the early 1930s, the Queensboro Corporation struggled financially throughout the decade. To raise money, the corporation began to build on land that until then had been kept open for community use, including the golf course, tennis courts and community garden. The corporation also began erecting traditional six-story apartment buildings. Dunolly Gardens, the last garden apartment complex that Thomas built, was an exception, a modernistic building completed in 1939. The corner windows, considered very innovative in the 1930s, gave the apartments a more spacious feeling.

Edward A. MacDougall died in 1944 and was succeeded as president of the Queensboro Corporation by his son, A.E. MacDougall, who wrote in the September 1944 Jackson Heights News that "As soon as [wartime] restrictions are lifted by the Government, Jackson Heights will be ready to provide the most attractive types of garden apartments in close proximity to the center of Manhattan." In 1947 the New York City Housing Authority tried to develop public housing in Jackson Heights. The local residents rejected proposal. In the 1940s the Queensboro Corporation sold much of its land to private developers. The Queensboro Corporation completed the Carlton House in 1947 and advertised the apartments for sale on a cooperative basis. Response was poor, and the corporation instead started to rent the apartments. In 1949 the corporation launched the Greenbrier, the last cooperative the Queensboro Corporation was to sell in Jackson Heights.

== Sources ==
- Barnouw, Erik (December 29, 1966). A History of Broadcasting in the United States: 1. A Tower of Babel: to 1933. Oxford University Press. ISBN 978-0-19-500474-8.
- Braine, Theresa (June 18, 2009). "Quaint in Queens: Jackson Heights is cutest 'hood in the borough". New York Daily News. Archived from the original on May 18, 2015.
- Hood, Clifton (July 13, 2004). 722 Miles: The Building of the Subways and How They Transformed New York. JHU Press. p. 173. ISBN 978-0-8018-8054-4.
- Jackson, Kenneth T., ed. (2010). The Encyclopedia of New York City (2nd ed.). New Haven: Yale University Press. p. 3100. ISBN 978-0-300-11465-2.
- Karatzas, Daniel (1998). "History of Jackson Heights". Archived from the original on November 30, 2012.
- Lindsay, David (May 30, 2005). Madness in the Making: The Triumphant Rise & Untimely Fall of America's Show Inventors. iUniverse. ISBN 978-0-595-34766-7.
- Maly, Michael (2005). Beyond Segregation: Multiracial And Multiethnic Neighborhoods. Temple University Press. ISBN 978-1-59213-135-8.
- New York City Landmarks Preservation Commission; Dolkart, Andrew S.; Postal, Matthew A. (2009). Postal, Matthew A. (ed.). Guide to New York City Landmarks (4th ed.). New York: John Wiley & Sons. ISBN 978-0-470-28963-1.
- Plunz, Richard (1990). A History of Housing in New York City: Dwelling Type and Social Change in the American Metropolis. Columbia University Press. ISBN 978-0-231-06297-8.
- Shukla, Sandhya Rajendra (2003). India Abroad: Diasporic Cultures of Postwar America and England. Princeton University Press. p. 88. ISBN 978-0-691-09267-6.
- Urbanelli, Elisa; Robins, Anthony W. (October 19, 1993). "Jackson Heights Historic District" (PDF). New York City Landmarks Preservation Commission.
- White, Norval; Willensky, Elliot; Leadon, Fran (2010). AIA Guide to New York City (5th ed.). New York: Oxford University Press. p. 768. ISBN 978-0-19538-386-7.
