= Dunbar Apartments =

Residential buildings in Manhattan, New York

- U.S. National Register of Historic Places
- New York State Register of Historic Places
- New York City Landmark
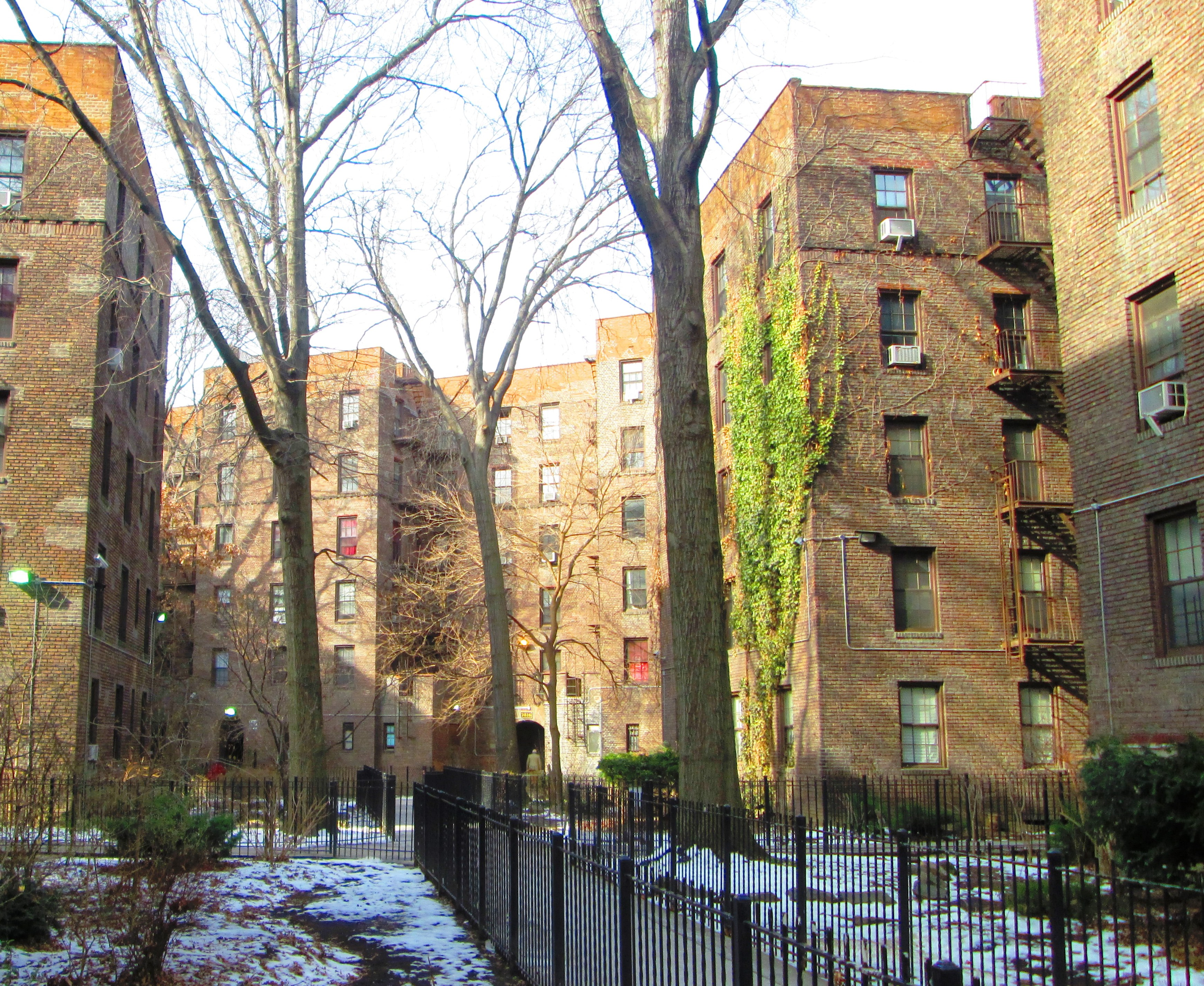
- courtyard (2014)

- Location within Manhattan Location within New York Location within the United States
- Location: W. 149th and 150th St btwn Frederick Douglass & AC Powell Jr. Blvds. Manhattan, New York City
- Coordinates: 40°49′30″N 73°56′18″W
- Area: 4.2 acres (1.7 ha)
- Built: 1926–28
- Architect: Andrew J. Thomas
- Website: https://dunbarapts.com/
- NRHP reference No.: 79001601
- NYCL No.: 0708

Significant dates
- Added to NRHP: March 29, 1979
- Designated NYSRHP: June 23, 1980
- Designated NYCL: July 14, 1970

The Dunbar Apartments, also known as the Paul Laurence Dunbar Garden Apartments or Dunbar Garden Apartments, is a complex of buildings located on West 149th and West 150th Streets between Frederick Douglass Boulevard/Macombs Place and Adam Clayton Powell Jr. Boulevard in the Harlem neighborhood of Manhattan, New York City. They were built by John D. Rockefeller Jr. from 1926 to 1928 to provide housing for African Americans, and was the first large cooperative aimed at that demographic. The buildings were designed by architect Andrew J. Thomas and were named in honor of the noted African American poet Paul Laurence Dunbar.

The complex consists of six separate buildings with a total of 511 apartments (as constructed) and occupies an entire city block. The buildings center around an interior garden courtyard, with each building U-shaped so that every apartment receives easy air flow and direct sunlight at some point during the day. The Dunbar is considered the "first large garden-complex in Manhattan."

The complex was designated a New York City Landmark in 1970, and was listed on the National Register of Historic Places (NRHP) in 1979. One of the buildings contains the Matthew Henson Residence, which is separately listed on the NRHP as a National Historic Landmark.

== History and description ==
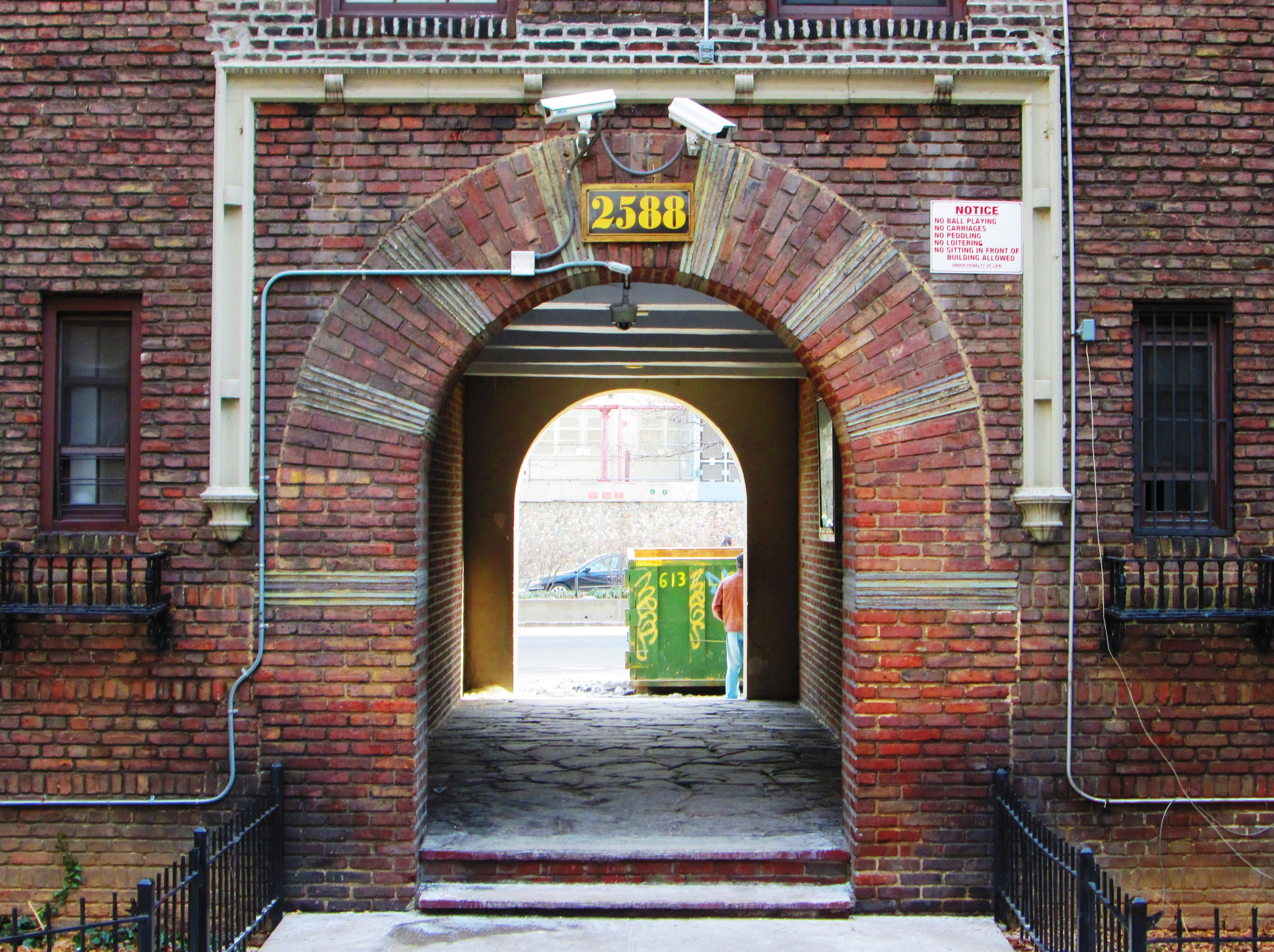
An entranceway seen from the courtyard

The Dunbar Apartments were constructed as an experiment in housing reform, to alleviate the housing shortage in Harlem and to provide housing for African Americans. Rather than being set up as rental apartments, the complex was a housing cooperative. Tenants were required to pay a down payment of $50 per room, and then $14.50 per room per month, much of which went towards a mortgage on the space. In 22 years, if payments were all made on time, the tenant would own the apartment. The project was both the first large cooperative aimed at African Americans, and also New York City's first large garden apartment complex.

The original tenants were primarily middle class, and inexpensive childcare was provided on-site to support working mothers. However, the building opened in 1928, and the Great Depression began just a year later. The management of the complex was forced to loosen a number of cooperative rules in order to allow people to, for example, take in lodgers. Even so, too many tenants failed to make their payments and the buildings defaulted on their mortgage to Rockefeller. He foreclosed in 1936, and a year later the buildings were converted to rental units.

In June 2013, the Dunbar Apartments were sold to the Brooklyn-based developer E&M Associates. Plans were set in motion to upgrade the facilities and establish the Dunbar as one of the premier upscale complexes in Upper Manhattan. These plans include renovating the vacant apartments, updating and refurbishing the interior courtyard and garden, and the addition of a variety of amenities including a fitness center, playground, additional security and a doorman. The contract was acquired by Samuel Berry and Andrew Melohn of Douglas Elliman working in conjunction with Fredrik Eklund.

== Matthew Henson Residence ==
- Matthew Henson Residence
- U.S. National Register of Historic Places
- U.S. National Historic Landmark
- New York State Register of Historic Places
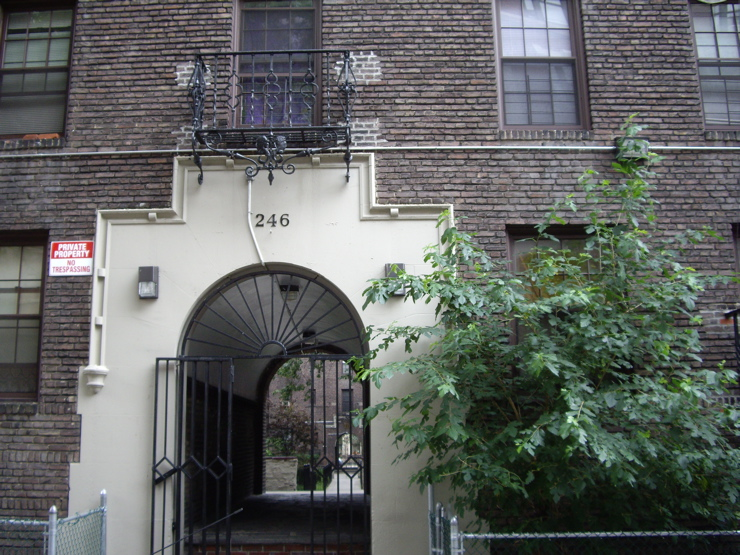
- Location: 246 W. 150th St., Apt. 3F, Manhattan, New York
- Coordinates: 40°49′31.6″N 73°56′19.5″W
- Area: less than one acre
- Built: 1928
- Part of: Dunbar Apartments (ID79001601)
- NRHP reference No.: 75001207
- NYSRHP No.: 06101.001797

Significant dates
- Added to NRHP: May 15, 1975
- Designated NHL: May 15, 1975
- Designated NYSRHP: June 23, 1980

One of the Dunbar Apartments' residences, apartment 3F at 246 West 150th Street, was occupied by African-American polar explorer Matthew Henson (1866-1955) from 1929 until his death. Henson was arguably the first man to reach the Geographic North Pole, a feat that is disputed in part by his own diary. His residence was named a National Historic Landmark in 1975.

246 West 150th Street is located on the south side of the street east of Frederick Douglass Boulevard. Matthew Henson was born in 1866 to free people of color in Maryland. He met Commander Robert E. Peary in 1887, who hired him for exploratory expeditions after learning of seagoing experiences he had as a teenager. Henson became an indispensable figure in the expeditions Peary led into the Arctic Ocean, assisting with the planning and logistics, as a translator with the local Inuit, and frequently as a groundbreaker in the party's movements. In 1909, as he was assigned the task of breaking trail in Peary's bid to reach the Geographic North Pole. The expedition claimed success in this attempt, although later analysis (based in part on descriptions contained in Henson's diary) of the available evidence suggests they actually fell short of the objective. Although Henson was denied the accolades showered upon Peary after the expedition, he was eventually honored with membership in The Explorers Club in 1937, and was lauded within the African-American community for his achievement, and has since been recognized at both national and state levels. A plaque marking his achievements is located outside one of the Dunbar building entrances.

== Notable residents ==
Noted personalities to live in the Dunbar Apartments include leaders of the Civil Rights Movement such as W. E. B. Du Bois, Paul Robeson, James Weldon Johnson, Walter White, A. Philip Randolph, and Noah D. Thompson, writers Claude McKay and William Melvin Kelley, entertainer Bill "Bojangles" Robinson, poet Countee Cullen, and the explorer Matthew Henson.

== See also ==
- List of New York City Landmarks
- National Register of Historic Places listings in New York County, New York
