= Beaver Dam Plantation =

Historic house in Tennessee, United States

- William Cannon Houston House
- U.S. National Register of Historic Places
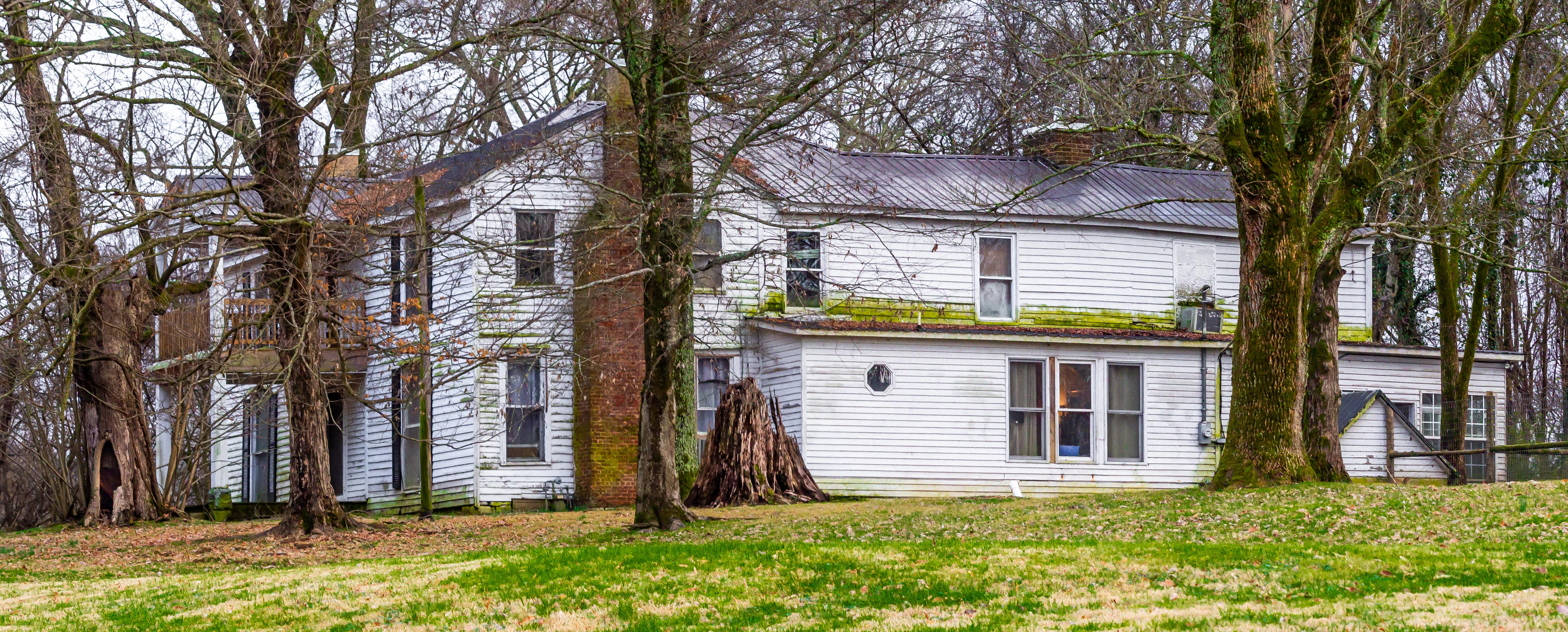

- Location within Tennessee Location within the United States
- Location: 107 Houston Ln. Woodbury, Tennessee
- Coordinates: 35°49′30″N 86°3′30″W
- Area: 28 acres (11 ha)
- Built: 1810s; c. 1870; c. 1880; c. 1930
- Architectural style: Greek Revival
- NRHP reference No.: 89000503
- Added to NRHP: June 16, 1989

The Beaver Dam Plantation, also known as the William Cannon Houston House, is a historic mansion on a Southern plantation in Woodbury, Tennessee, United States.

== History ==
A log building was first built c. 1810. The plantation was acquired and expanded by politician William C. Houston in 1873. Houston built the mansion in the early 1870s. His son, Frank K. Houston, later Chairman of Chemical Bank (now known as CITIBANK), was born on the plantation. A formal dining-room was added circa 1880, and a rear porch circa 1930. The home is well known in rock hunting circles for its spectacular geode pillars. They were constructed with the help of farmhands, by the six brothers of the family. They were built as an anniversary present for Judge Houston and his wife Lizzie Minor McLemore Houston.

Beaver Dam began as a trading post. The name is born of the frustration of a fur trader named McFerrin, who disputed the claims of an unknown trapper, that one of his pelts was indeed, that of a beaver. Beaver Dam was also a stopping point along the infamous "Trail of Tears" along which the Cherokee Nation was forced to move to Oklahoma by then-President Andrew Jackson.

Beaver Dam was the Civil War encampment site of General Nathan Bedford Forrest's 4th Tennessee Cavalry, before its raid on Murfreesboro. Family lore speculates that Judge W.C. Houston met his future father-in-law, Col. William S. McLemore of the Starnes-McLemore Unit (TN 4th Cavalry). However, in keeping with other family lore, it is more probable that young Houston, then ten or eleven years old, was kept hidden in the caves of Doolittle, the home of his mother Elizabeth Morgan Houston Fugitt, in order to avoid conscription into the Confederate Army.

Beaver Dam was always a center of life in Cannon County, this included serving as the site where prospective soldiers signed their enlistment papers to join the U.S. and Confederate Armies. It served in this capacity from the War of 1812 until World War I.

Beaver Dam sits along the route of the first state highway in Tennessee, known as "State Route One", "The Memphis to Bristol Highway." The historic home has played host to many politicians, including Sam Rayburn, Jimmy Byrnes, John Nance Garner and Cordell Hull. Houston served in the U.S. House of Representatives as Chairman of the House Committees and Chairman of the House Committee on the Census. Judge Houston, as he was commonly known, was also a Presidential Elector.

Houston was also an agricultural innovator and among other achievements, he built the first grain silo in the County. The Plantation's crops included tobacco and wheat. Tennessee Walking Horses and cattle made up the rest of the plantation's farming activities. Until 1973, the Plantation comprised 800 acres (320 ha).

== Architectural significance ==
The mansion was designed in the Greek Revival architectural style. It has been listed on the National Register of Historic Places since June 16, 1989.
