= William C. Houston =

American politician (1852–1931)

William Cannon Houston
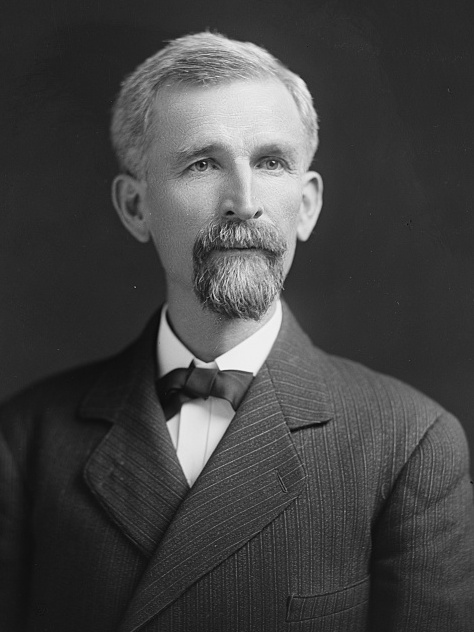
- circa 1905–1906

Member of the U.S. House of Representatives from Tennessee's 5th district
- In office March 4, 1905 – March 3, 1919
- Preceded by: James D. Richardson
- Succeeded by: Ewin L. Davis

Member of the Tennessee House of Representatives
- In office 1877-1879; 1881-1885

Personal details
- Born: March 17, 1852 Shelbyville, Tennessee, U.S.
- Died: August 30, 1931 (aged 79) Cannon County, Tennessee, U.S.
- Party: Democratic
- Spouse: Lizzie Minor McLemore Houston
- Profession: planter; newspaper publisher; Attorney; politician; judge

William Cannon Houston (March 17, 1852 – August 30, 1931) was an American politician and a member of the United States House of Representatives for the 5th congressional district of Tennessee.

== Biography ==
Born in Shelbyville, Tennessee, in Bedford County, Houston moved with his mother to Woodbury, Tennessee, in Cannon County in 1858. He attended the schools of Woodbury and Sweetwater, Tennessee. He engaged in agricultural pursuits and later in the publication of a newspaper.

== Career ==
Houston was a member of the Tennessee House of Representatives from 1877 to 1879 and from 1881 to 1885. He studied law, was admitted to the bar in 1878, and commenced practice in Woodbury, Tennessee. He was a member of the Democratic state executive committee in 1888. He was chairman of the Democratic state convention in 1888. He was elected judge of the eighth judicial circuit in 1894, was re-elected in 1902, and served until he was elected to Congress.

Elected as a Democratic to the Fifty-ninth and the six succeeding Congresses, Houston served from March 4, 1905, to March 3, 1919, and was not a candidate for renomination in 1918. He was the chairman of the United States House Committee on the Census during the Sixty-second Congress and chairman of the United States House Committee on Territories during the Sixty-third through Sixty-fifth Congresses. He was a delegate to the Democratic National Convention in 1920.

== Death and legacy ==
Houston died on his Beaver Dam Plantation near Woodbury, Tennessee, on August 30, 1931. He is interred at Riverside Cemetery near Woodbury, Tennessee. His son, Frank K. Houston, became a banking executive.

U.S. House of Representatives
Preceded by James D. Richardson	Member of the U.S. House of Representatives from Tennessee's 5th congressional district 1905–1919	Succeeded by Ewin L. Davis
