= Huo College =

Residential college at Princeton University

- Residential college
- Princeton University
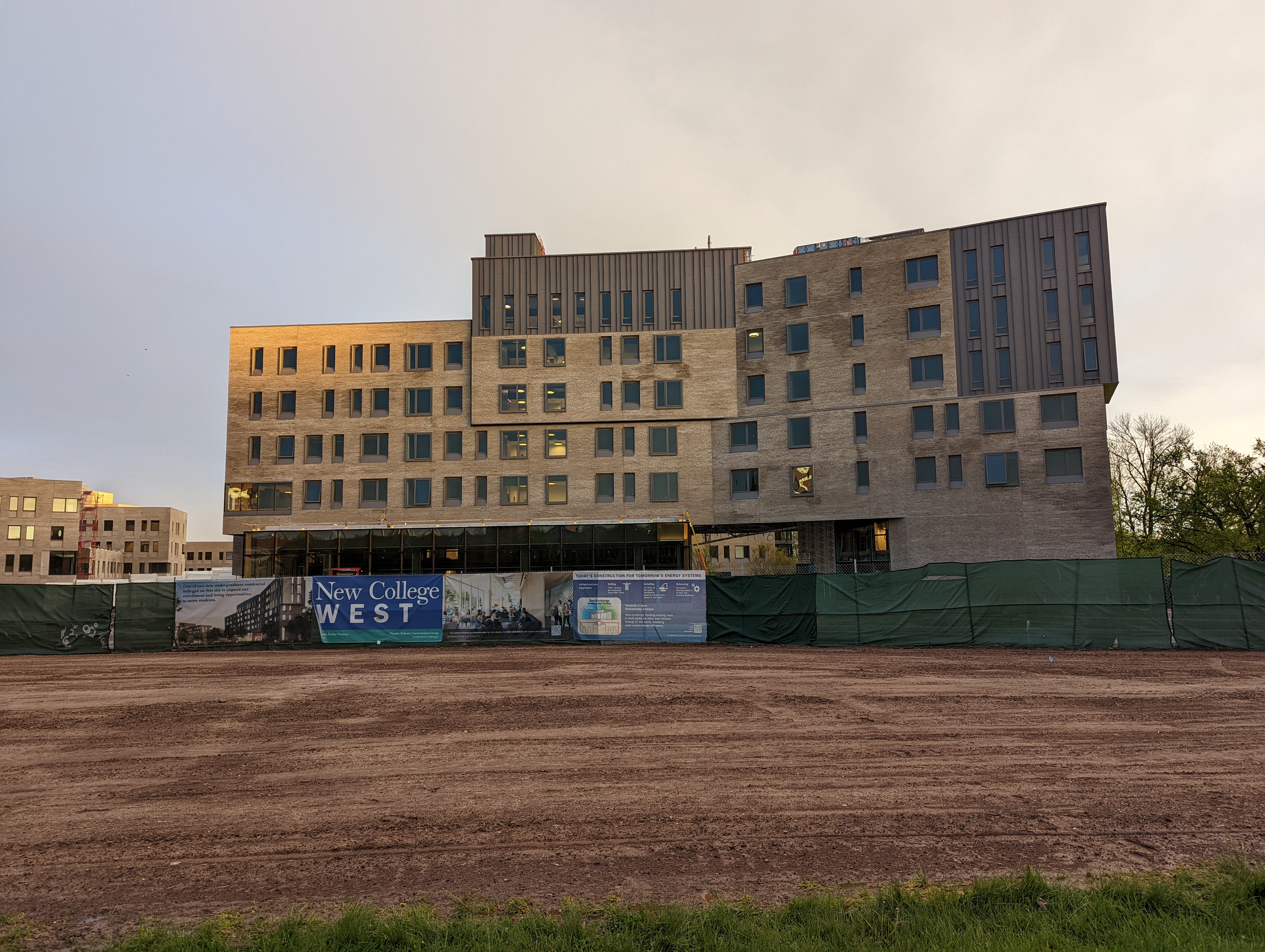
- New College West near completion in 2022

- Coordinates: 40.34207°N 74.65495°W
- Established: 2022
- Sister college: Yeh College
- Undergraduates: around 500
- Website: huocollege.princeton.edu

Huo College is the sixth residential college at Princeton University. The construction of Huo College, provisionally known as New College West, helped to increase the undergraduate student body population by 10 percent, or 500 students. It aims to be LEED Gold certified. Deborah Berke Partners are the architects of the new buildings. Huo College is adjacent to Yeh College, and shares the same dining facility. Huo College houses students displaced by the demolition of First College, which is to be replaced with Hobson College in 2027.

== History and Naming ==
The college was originally made possible by a $65 million gift from the Perelman Family Foundation, run by Debra '96 and Ronald Perelman. Prior to the removal of the Perelman name in 2021, it would have been the first residential college at Princeton to be named after Jewish people.

In June 2021, prior to the college's opening, Princeton University removed the Perelman name from New College West after the Perelman Family Foundation ceased payments to the University under their gift agreement.

In June 2026, Princeton University announced the renaming of New College West to Huo College, after a gift from graduate alumnus Yan Huo *94.
