= Yeh College =

Residential college at Princeton University

- Residential college
- Princeton University
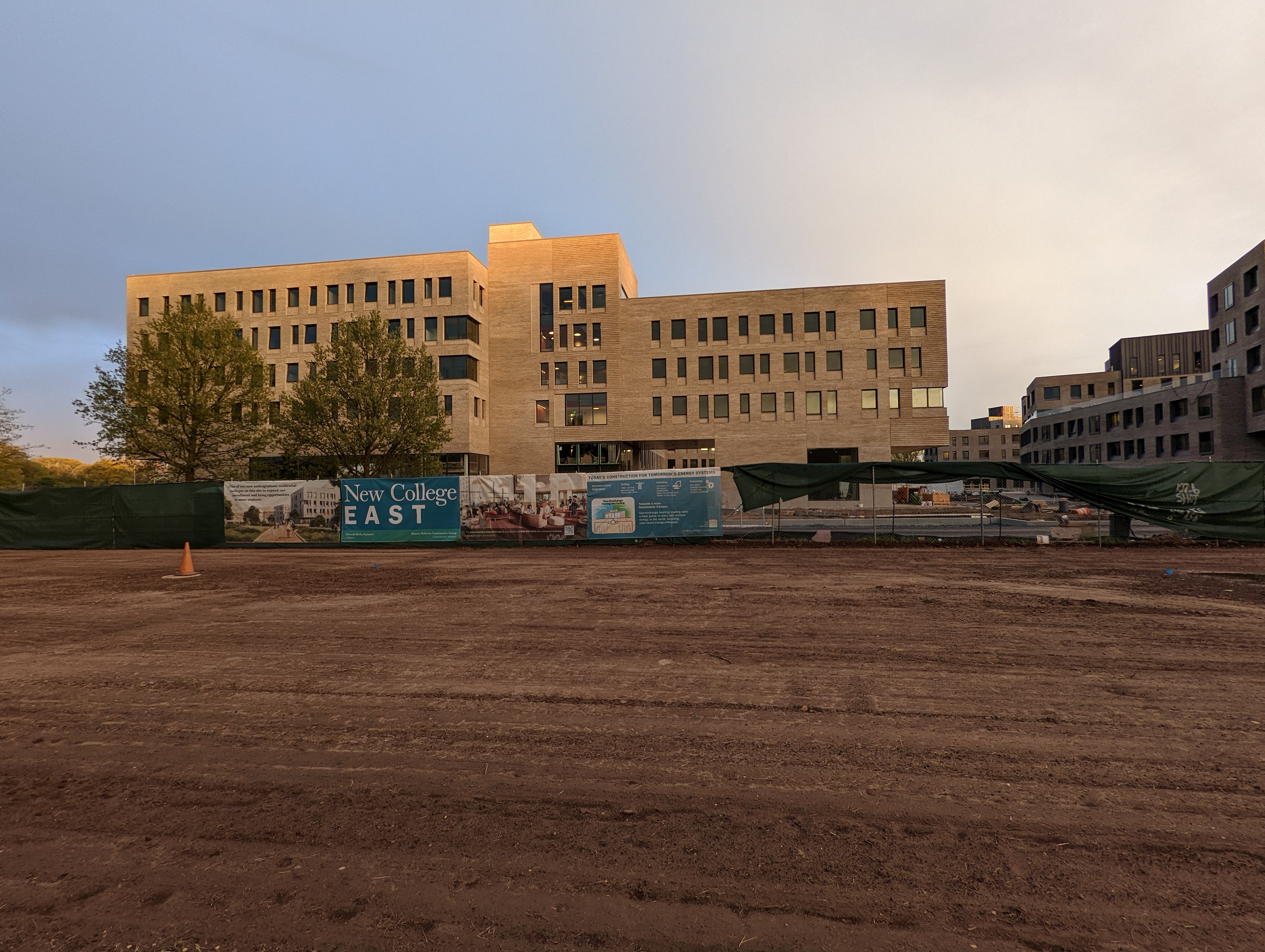
- New College East near completion in 2022

- Coordinates: 40°20′33″N 74°39′17″W
- Established: 2022
- Sister college: New College West
- Head: Yair Mintzker
- Undergraduates: around 500
- Website: https://yehcollege.princeton.edu

Yeh College (provisionally known as New College East until 2022, and Residential College 7 until 2021) is the seventh residential college at Princeton University. It opened at the beginning of the academic year in September 2022. The construction of Yeh College increased the undergraduate student body population by 10 percent, or 500 students. It aims to be LEED Gold certified. Deborah Berke Partners are the architects of the new buildings. A sister college, tentatively titled New College West, was built adjacent to Yeh College, and shares the same dining facility. New College West houses students displaced by the demolition of First College, which is to be replaced with Hobson College in 2027.
