= Rockefeller College =

Residential college at Princeton University

- Residential college
- Princeton University
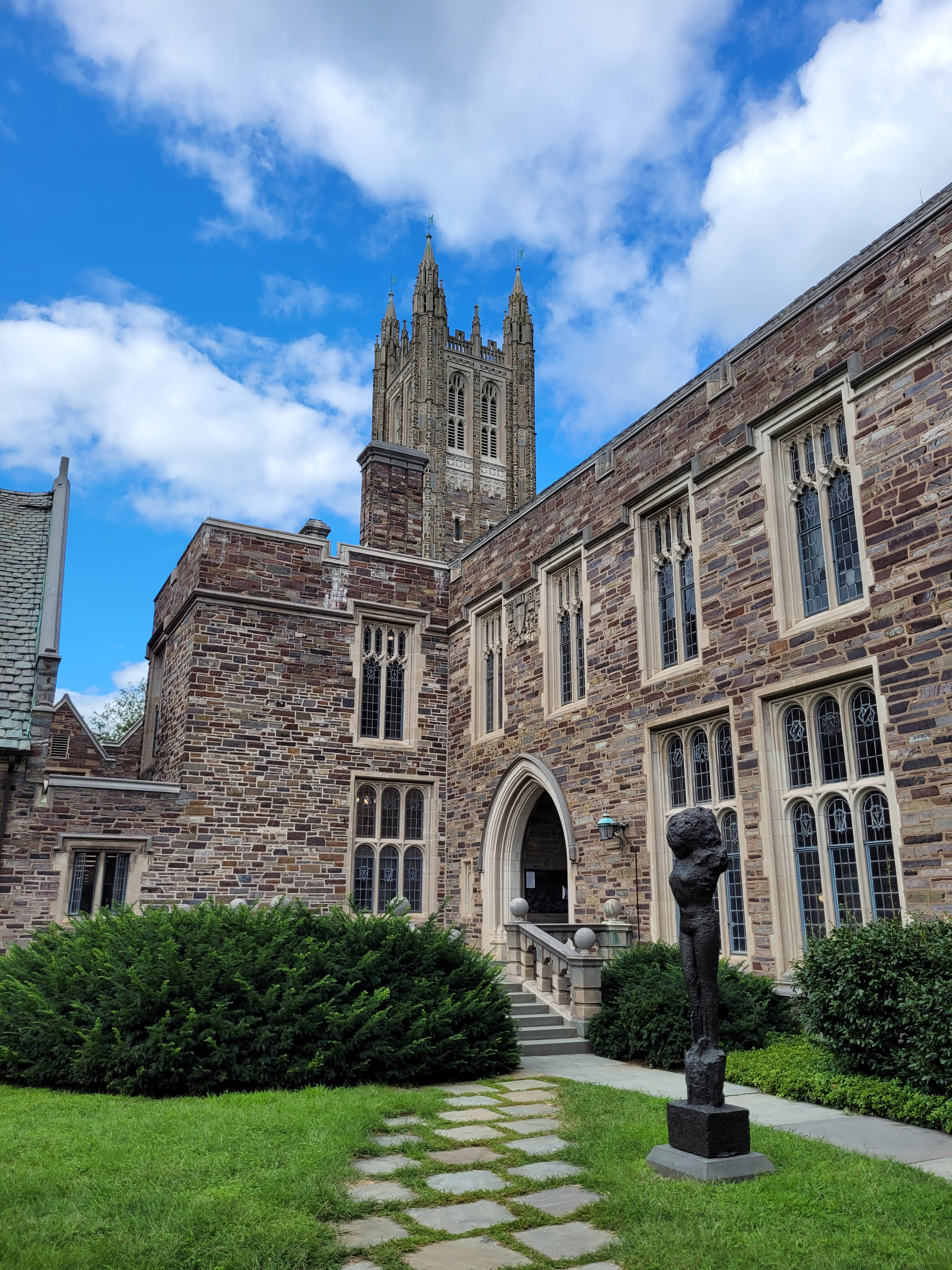
- Rockefeller College, Madison Hall, inside the courtyard

- Coordinates: 40°20′55″N 74°39′44″W
- Full name: John D. Rockefeller 3rd College
- Established: 1982
- Named for: John D. Rockefeller 3rd
- Head: Adam Finkelstein
- Dean: Justine Hernandez Levine
- Website: rockefellercollege.princeton.edu

John D. Rockefeller 3rd College, or "Rocky", is one of seven residential colleges at Princeton University. It was founded in 1982, making it the third residential college to be established at Princeton. It is named for John D. Rockefeller 3rd, Princeton Class of 1929, who served as a major donor and longtime trustee of the University.

The college is located in the northwestern corner of the Princeton campus and is largely composed of Collegiate Gothic style structures. Madison Hall, home of the college dining hall, office, and common spaces, and the dorms Holder Hall, Buyers Hall (formerly "East Blair Hall"), and part of Campbell Hall are presently part of Rockefeller College. Witherspoon Hall, built in 1877, is the oldest building in the college, and is characteristically Richardsonian Romanesque, a style which predates the Collegiate Gothic.

The college is home to roughly 500 first-years and sophomores and a small number of upperclassmen. The college staff is led by the head (a faculty member), and also includes a dean, a director of studies, a college administrator, a college secretary, and two graduate student assistant masters. The current master of Rockefeller College is Clancy Rowley, Professor of Mechanical and Aerospace Engineering. A council of current students also contributes to college life, organizing trips, study breaks, and other opportunities.

Beginning with the 2007–2008 school year, Rockefeller College has, along with Princeton's other residential colleges, catered to upperclassmen as well as underclassmen, with new programs and advising. The college now houses mostly first-year and sophomore students, with some spaces for juniors and seniors in addition to Residential College Advisors.

Rockefeller College's common room, Holder Hall, and Blair Arch (which adjoins Buyers Hall but is technically a part of Mathey College) were all featured in the film A Beautiful Mind.
