= Mathey College =

Residential college at Princeton University

Coordinates: 40.348114°N 74.66216°W

- Residential college
- Princeton University
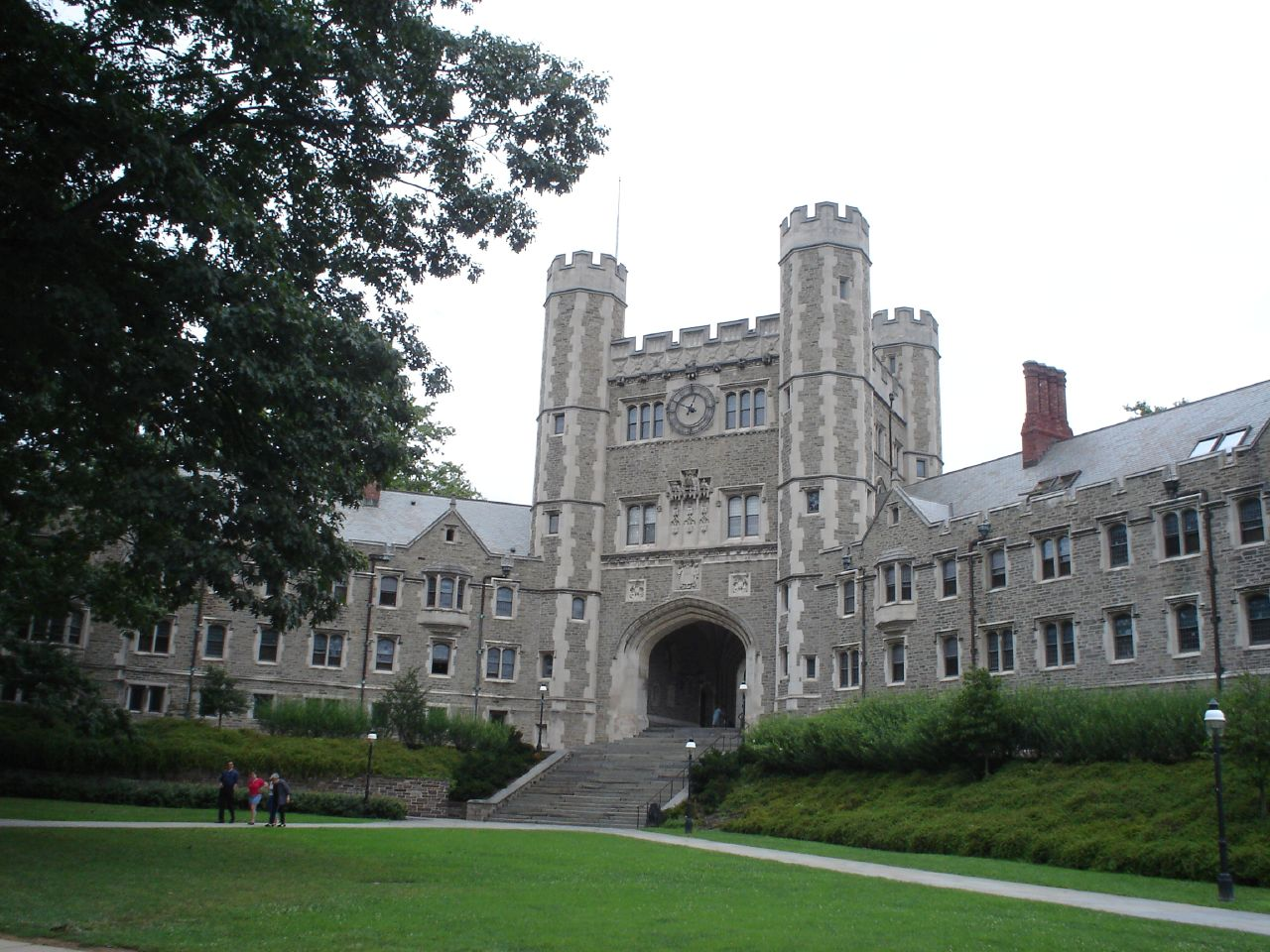

- Nickname: Matty or The Herd
- Established: November 6, 1983
- Named for: Dean Mathey
- Architectural style: Collegiate Gothic
- Colors: Maroon
- Head: Effie Rentzou
- Dean: Michael Olin
- Residents: 500
- Undergraduates: 800
- Website: matheycollege.princeton.edu

Mathey College is one of seven residential colleges at Princeton University. Located in the Northwest corner of the Princeton Campus, its dormitories and other buildings are predominantly in the Collegiate Gothic style. Since the fall of 2007, Mathey has been a four-year residential college, paired with Rockefeller College.

Most of Mathey College is centered on a large central courtyard featuring a sand volleyball court. Campbell Hall, Joline Hall, Blair Hall, Hamilton Hall (with the dining hall and common room), Edwards Hall, and some of Little Hall (since fall 2007) make up the residential college. Hamilton Hall, Little Hall, and Edwards Hall are not on the main courtyard, though they are near to it.

Mathey College is famous for Blair Arch, featured prominently in the movie A Beautiful Mind. As the largest arch at Princeton, Blair Arch hosts many arch sings, a cappella concerts held in the arch.

Mathey College is named after Dean Mathey, of the Class of 1912, who was a prominent member of the Princeton community.

Today, in 2026, Mathey is known for its recording studio, dark room, and film theater.

The current dean is Dr. Michael Olin, and the current Head of the College, as of July 1, 2026, is Effie Rentzou, Professor of French.
