= Kelo v. City of New London =

Kelo v. New London
- Supreme Court of the United States

Argued February 22, 2005 Decided June 23, 2005
- Full case name: Susette Kelo, et al. v. City of New London, Connecticut, et al.
- Docket no.: 04-108
- Citations: 545 U.S. 469 (more) 125 S. Ct. 2655; 162 L. Ed. 2d 439; 2005 U.S. LEXIS 5011; 60 ERC (BNA) 1769; 18 Fla. L. Weekly Fed. S 437
- Argument: Oral argument

Case history
- Prior: Judgment for defendants as regarding certain plaintiffs, judgment for remaining plaintiffs, Kelo v. City of New London, 2002 Conn. Super. LEXIS 789 (Conn. Super. Ct. Mar. 13, 2002); affirmed and reversed in part, remanded, 268 Conn. 1, 843 A.2d 500 (Conn. 2004); cert. granted, 542 U.S. 965 (2004)
- Procedural: Writ of Certiorari to the Supreme Court of Connecticut
- Subsequent: Rehearing denied, 545 U.S. 1158 (2005).

Questions presented
- What protection does the Fifth Amendment's public use requirement provide for individuals whose property is being condemned, not to eliminate slums or blight, but for the sole purpose of "economic development" that will perhaps increase tax revenues and improve the local economy?

Holding
- The governmental taking of property from one private owner to give to another in furtherance of economic development constitutes a permissible "public use" under the Fifth Amendment. Supreme Court of Connecticut decision affirmed.

Court membership
- Chief Justice William Rehnquist Associate Justices John P. Stevens · Sandra Day O'Connor; Antonin Scalia · Anthony Kennedy; David Souter · Clarence Thomas; Ruth Bader Ginsburg · Stephen Breyer

Case opinions
- Majority: Stevens, joined by Kennedy, Souter, Ginsburg, Breyer
- Concurrence: Kennedy
- Dissent: O'Connor, joined by Rehnquist, Scalia, Thomas
- Dissent: Thomas

Laws applied
- U.S. Const. amends. V, XIV

Kelo v. City of New London, 545 U.S. 469 (2005), is a landmark decision by the Supreme Court of the United States in which the Court held, 5–4, that the use of eminent domain to transfer land from one private owner to another private owner to further economic development does not violate the Takings Clause of the Fifth Amendment. In the case, plaintiff Susette Kelo sued the city of New London, Connecticut, for violating her civil rights after the city tried to acquire her house's property through eminent domain so that the land could be used as part of a "comprehensive redevelopment plan". Justice John Paul Stevens wrote for the five-justice majority that the city's use of eminent domain was permissible under the Takings Clause because the general benefits the community would enjoy from economic growth qualified as "public use".

After the Court's decision, the city allowed a private developer to proceed with its plans; however, the developer was unable to obtain financing and abandoned the project, and the contested land became an undeveloped empty lot.

The decision from this case sparked controversy with 47 states expanding their eminent domain authorities and 12 states amending their state constitutions to stop eminent domain from benefiting private parties.

== Background ==
This case was appealed to the Supreme Court of the United States from a decision by the Supreme Court of Connecticut in favor of the City of New London. The owners, including lead plaintiff Susette Kelo of 8 East Street, sued the city in Connecticut courts, arguing that the city had misused its eminent domain power. The power of eminent domain is limited by the Takings Clause of the Fifth Amendment and the Due Process Clause of the Fourteenth Amendment. The Takings Clause reads, ". . . nor shall private property be taken for public use, without just compensation." Under the Due Process Clause of the Fourteenth Amendment, this limitation also applies to the actions of state and local governments. The plaintiffs argued that economic development, the stated purpose of the taking and subsequent transfer of land to the New London Development Corporation, did not qualify as a public use under the Fifth Amendment.

The Connecticut Supreme Court heard arguments on December 2, 2002. The state court issued its decision (268 Conn. 1, SC16742) on March 9, 2004, siding with the city in a 4–3 decision, with the majority opinion authored by Justice Flemming L. Norcott, Jr., joined by Justices David M. Borden, Richard N. Palmer and Christine Vertefeuille. Justice Peter T. Zarella wrote the dissent, joined by Chief Justice William J. Sullivan and Justice Joette Katz.

The State Supreme Court held that the use of eminent domain for economic development did not violate the public use clauses of the state and federal constitutions. The court held that if a legislative body has found that an economic project will create new jobs, increase tax and other city revenues, and revitalize a depressed urban area (even if that area is not blighted), then the project serves a public purpose, which qualifies as a public use. The court also ruled that the government’s delegation of its eminent domain power to a private entity was constitutional under the Connecticut Constitution. The United States Supreme Court granted certiorari to consider questions raised in Berman v. Parker, 348 U.S. 26 (1954) and later in Hawaii Housing Authority v. Midkiff, 467 U.S. 229 (1984). Namely, whether a "public purpose" constitutes a "public use" for purposes of the Fifth Amendment's Taking Clause: "nor shall private property be taken for public use, without just compensation." Specifically, does the Fifth Amendment, applicable to the states through the Due Process Clause of the Fourteenth Amendment (see main article: Incorporation of the Bill of Rights), protect landowners from takings for economic development, rather than, as in Berman, for the elimination of slums and blight?

Kelo was the first major eminent domain case heard at the Supreme Court since 1984. In that time, many states and municipalities had slowly extended their use of eminent domain, frequently to include economic development purposes. At the time of the Kelo decision, the high courts of Kansas, Maryland, Minnesota, New York, and North Dakota all had held that simply increasing tax revenue and creating jobs are public purposes and that eminent domain for the purpose of private development is constitutional. On the other hand, the state high courts of Arkansas, Florida, Illinois, Kentucky, Maine, Michigan, Montana, South Carolina, and Washington had held that eminent domain for economic development was impermissible. In the Kelo case, Connecticut had a statute allowing eminent domain for "economic development" even in the absence of blight. There was also an additional twist in that the development corporation was ostensibly a private entity; thus, the plaintiffs argued that it was not constitutional for the government to take private property from one individual or corporation and give it to another, if the government was simply doing so because the repossession would put the property to a use that would generate higher tax revenue.

Kelo became the focus of vigorous discussion and attracted numerous supporters on both sides. Some 40 amicus curiae briefs were filed in the case, 25 on behalf of the petitioners. Susette Kelo's supporters ranged from the libertarian Institute for Justice (the lead attorneys on the case) to the NAACP, AARP, the Southern Christian Leadership Conference and South Jersey Legal Services. The latter groups signed an amicus brief arguing that eminent domain has often been used against politically weak communities with high concentrations of minorities and elderly.

The case was argued on February 22, 2005. Oral arguments were presented on behalf of the petitioners (plaintiffs) by Scott G. Bullock of the Institute for Justice in Washington, D.C. and on behalf of the respondents (defendants) by Wesley W. Horton of Horton, Shields & Knox in Hartford, CT. The case was heard by only seven members of the court. With William Rehnquist and John Paul Stevens (who were senior to Sandra Day O'Connor) absent, O'Connor became the senior justice presiding over oral arguments, becoming the first woman to do so before the Court.

During the case, Justice Antonin Scalia asked whether a ruling in favor of the city would destroy "the distinction between private use and public use." He also asked if private use, which provided merely incidental benefits to the state, was "not enough to justify use of the condemnation power."

== Opinion of the Court ==
=== Majority and concurrence ===
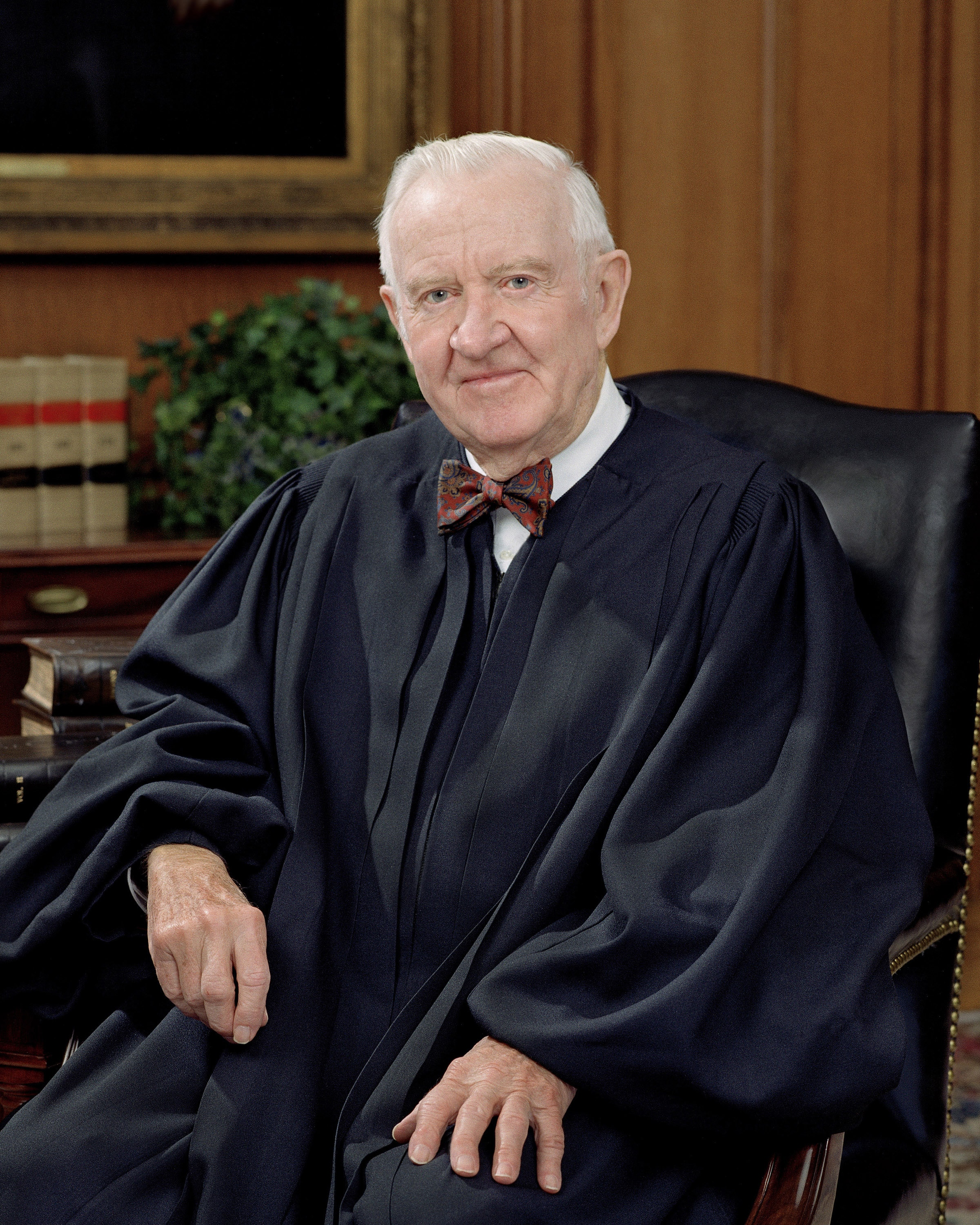
John Paul Stevens delivered the opinion of the Court

On June 23, 2005, the Supreme Court ruled in a 5–4 decision in favor of the City of New London. Justice John Paul Stevens wrote the majority opinion, joined by Justices Anthony Kennedy, David Souter, Ruth Bader Ginsburg, and Stephen Breyer. Justice Kennedy wrote a concurring opinion setting out a more detailed standard for judicial review of economic development takings than that found in Stevens's majority opinion. In so doing, Justice Kennedy contributed to the Court's trend of turning minimum scrutiny—the idea that government policy need only bear a rational relation to a legitimate government purpose—into a fact-based test.

Kennedy fleshed out this doctrine in his Kelo concurring opinion; he set out a program of civil discovery in the context of a challenge to an assertion of government purpose. However, he did not explicitly limit these criteria to eminent domain, nor to minimum scrutiny, suggesting that they may be generalized to all health and welfare regulation in the scrutiny regime. He wrote:

A court confronted with a plausible accusation of impermissible favoritism to private parties should [conduct]... a careful and extensive inquiry into 'whether, in fact, the development plan [chronology]

[1.] is of primary benefit to... the developer... and private businesses which "may" eventually locate in the plan area...

[2.] and in that regard, only of incidental benefit to the city...'"

Kennedy is also interested in facts of the chronology which show, with respect to government,

[3.] awareness of... depressed economic condition and evidence corroborating the validity of this concern...

[4.] the substantial commitment of public funds... before most of the private beneficiaries were known...

[5.] evidence that [government] reviewed a variety of development plans...

[6.] [government] chose a private developer from a group of applicants rather than picking out a particular transferee beforehand and...

[7.] other private beneficiaries of the project [were]... unknown [to government] because the... space proposed to be built [had] not yet been rented...

Kelo v. City of New London did not establish entirely new law concerning eminent domain. Although the decision was controversial, it was not the first time "public use" had been interpreted by the Supreme Court as "public purpose." In the majority opinion, Justice Stevens wrote the "Court long ago rejected any literal requirement that condemned property be put into use for the general public" (545 U.S. 469). Thus, precedent played an important role in the 5–4 decision of the Supreme Court. The Fifth Amendment was interpreted the same way as in Midkiff (467 U.S. 229) and other earlier eminent domain cases.

=== Dissenting opinions ===
The principal dissent was issued on June 25, 2005, by Justice O'Connor, joined by Chief Justice Rehnquist and Justices Scalia and Thomas. The dissenting opinion suggested that the use of this taking power in a reverse Robin Hood fashion—take from the poor, give to the rich—would become the norm, not the exception:

Any property may now be taken for the benefit of another private party, but the fallout from this decision will not be random. The beneficiaries are likely to be those citizens with disproportionate influence and power in the political process, including large corporations and development firms.

O'Connor argued that the decision eliminates "any distinction between private and public use of property—and thereby effectively delete[s] the words 'for public use' from the Takings Clause of the Fifth Amendment."

Thomas also issued a separate originalist dissent, in which he argued that the precedents the court's decision relied upon were flawed. He accuses the majority of replacing the Fifth Amendment's "Public Use" clause with a very different "public purpose" test:

This deferential shift in phraseology enables the Court to hold, against all common sense, that a costly urban-renewal project whose stated purpose is a vague promise of new jobs and increased tax revenue, but which is also suspiciously agreeable to the Pfizer Corporation, is for a 'public use.'

Thomas additionally observed:

Something has gone seriously awry with this Court's interpretation of the Constitution. Though citizens are safe from the government in their homes, the homes themselves are not.

Thomas also made use of the argument presented in the NAACP/AARP/SCLC/SJLS amicus brief on behalf of three low-income residents' groups fighting redevelopment in New Jersey, noting:

Allowing the government to take property solely for public purposes is bad enough, but extending the concept of public purpose to encompass any economically beneficial goal guarantees that these losses will fall disproportionately on poor communities. Those communities are not only systematically less likely to put their lands to the highest and best social use, but are also the least politically powerful.

== Subsequent developments ==
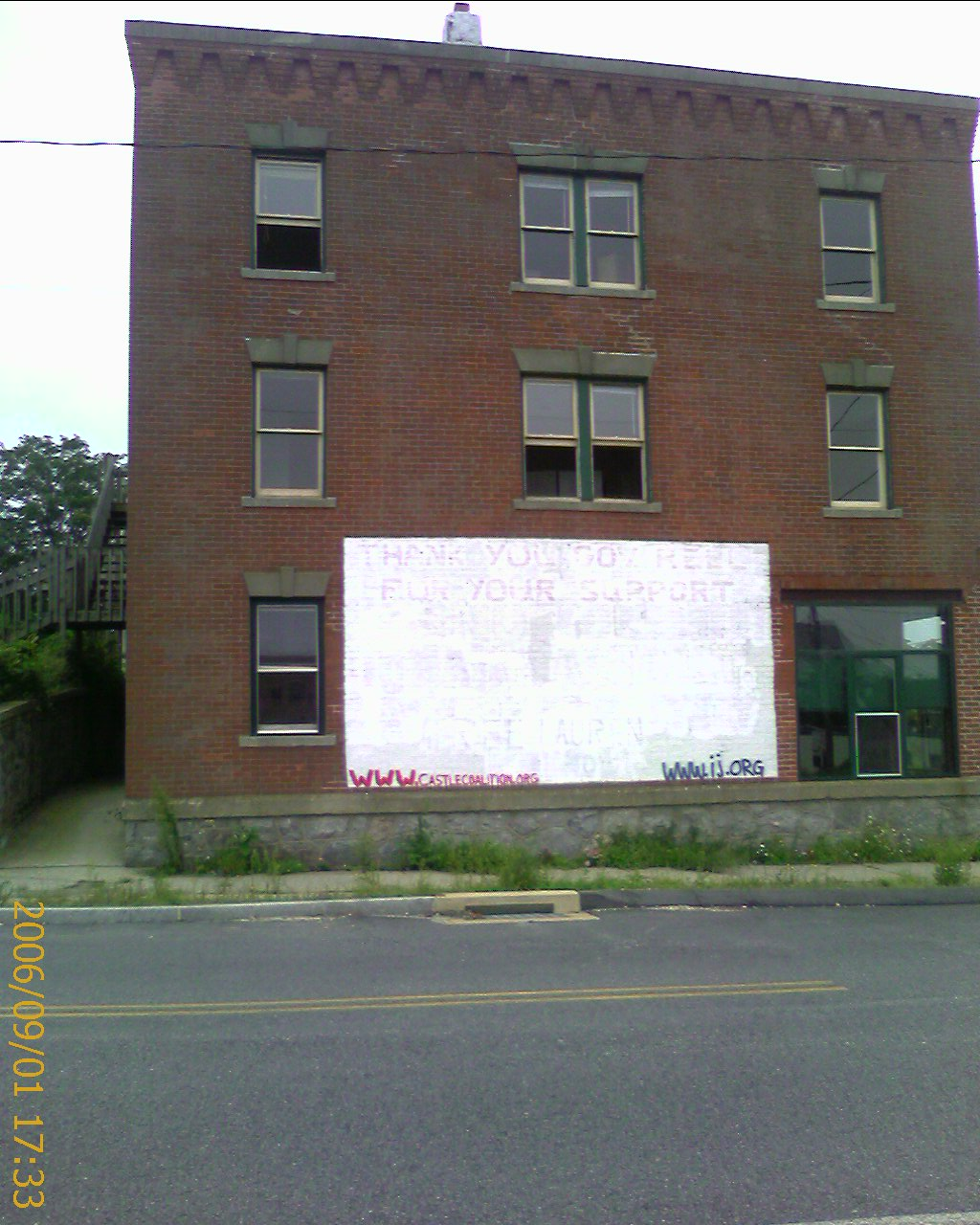
One of the few remaining houses in the Fort Trumbull neighborhood, September 1, 2006. Underneath the white paint can just barely be read the words "Thank you Gov. Rell for your support" and the web URLs of two organizations protesting over-use of eminent domain, Castle Coalition and Institute for Justice.

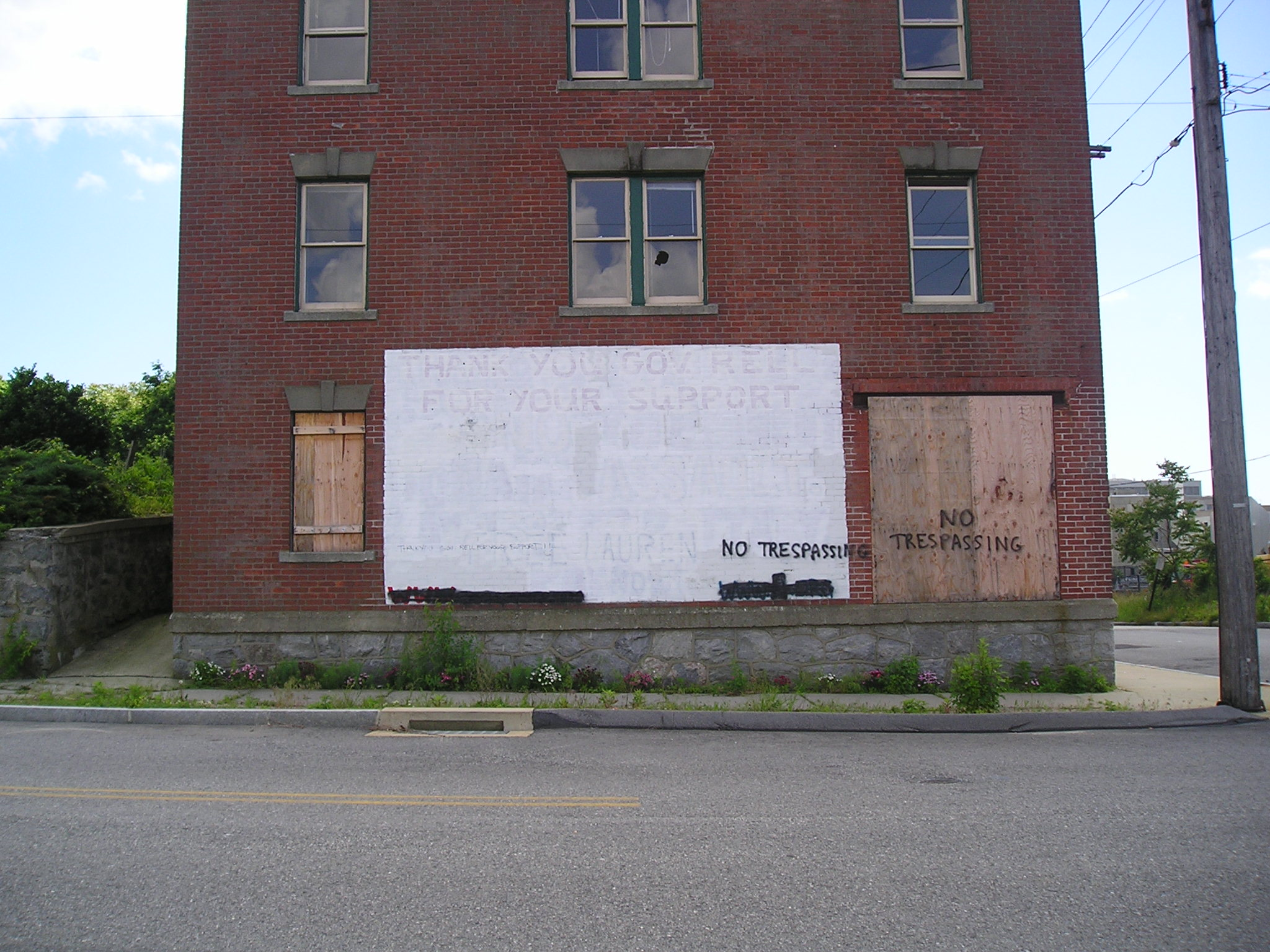
The same house, June 10, 2007. The "thank you" is still visible, but some windows are broken, and others are boarded up, and "No Trespassing" has been spray-painted on it, as well as the URLs being obscured by spray paint.

Following the decision, many of the plaintiffs expressed an intent to find other means by which they could continue contesting the seizure of their homes. Soon after the decision, city officials announced plans to charge the residents of the homes for back rent for the five years since condemnation procedures began. The city contended that the residents have been on city property for those five years and owe tens of thousands of dollars of rent. In June 2006, Governor M. Jodi Rell intervened with New London city officials, proposing the homeowners involved in the suit be deeded property in the Fort Trumbull neighborhood so they could retain their homes. A group of New London residents formed a local political party, One New London, to combat the takings.

The controversy was eventually settled when the city paid substantial additional compensation to the homeowners, and agreed to move Kelo's home to a new location. The land was never deeded back to the original homeowners, most of whom have left New London for nearby communities. Three years after the Supreme Court case was decided, the Kelo house was dedicated after being relocated to 36 Franklin Street, a site close to downtown New London. Susette Kelo, however, has moved to a different part of Connecticut.

In spite of repeated efforts, the redeveloper (who stood to get a 91-acre (370,000 m^{2}) waterfront tract of land for $1 per year) was unable to obtain financing, and the redevelopment project was abandoned. As of the beginning of 2010, the original Kelo property was a vacant lot, generating no tax revenue for the city. In the aftermath of 2011's Hurricane Irene, the now-closed New London redevelopment area was turned into a dump for storm debris such as tree branches and other vegetation. However, as of May 2022, a private developer was slated to build 100 apartments, a 100-unit hotel, and a community center on the property. As of July 2024, the community center is the only project where ground has been broken.

Pfizer, whose employees were supposed to be the clientele of the Fort Trumbull redevelopment project, announced its acquisition of competitor of Wyeth 42 months after the ruling was issued in January 2009, resulting in a consolidation of research facilities of the two companies; the deal closed that October. Pfizer chose to retain the Groton campus on the east side of the Thames River, closing its New London facility in late 2010 with a loss of over 1,000 jobs. That coincided with the expiration of tax breaks on the New London site that would have increased Pfizer's property tax bill by almost 400 percent.

After the Pfizer announcement, the San Francisco Chronicle, in November 2009, in its lead editorial called the Kelo decision infamous:

The well-laid plans of redevelopers, however, did not pan out. The land where Susette Kelo's little pink house once stood remains undeveloped. The proposed hotel-retail-condo "urban village" has not been built. And earlier this month, Pfizer Inc. announced that it is closing the $350 million research center in New London that was the anchor for the New London redevelopment plan, and will be relocating some 1,500 jobs.

The Chronicle editorial quoted from The New York Times:

"They stole our home for economic development," ousted homeowner Michael Cristofaro told the New York Times. "It was all for Pfizer, and now they get up and walk away."

The final cost to the city and state for the purchase and bulldozing of the formerly privately held property was $78 million. The promised 3,169 new jobs and $1.2 million a year in tax revenues had not materialized, and nearly 2 decades passed before serious development on the site began.

=== Public reaction ===
Opposition to the ruling was widespread, coming from groups such as AARP, the NAACP, the Libertarian Party, and the Institute for Justice. The American Conservative Union condemned the decision. Much of the public viewed the outcome as a gross violation of property rights and as a misinterpretation of the Fifth Amendment, the consequence of which would be to benefit large corporations at the expense of individual homeowners and local communities. Many owners of family farms also disapproved of the ruling, as they saw it as an avenue by which cities could seize their land for private developments. Since the opposition to the ruling was so widespread, American journalist Charles C. W. Cooke argued in 2015 that a constitutional amendment like the one drafted by law professor Ilya Somin might attract enough support by a non-partisan coalition of progressives, independents and conservatives to undo the Supreme Court ruling in Kelo v. City of New London.

Some in the legal profession construed the public's outrage as being directed not at the interpretation of legal principles involved in the case, but at the broad moral principles of the general outcome. Federal appeals court judge Richard Posner wrote that the political response to Kelo is "evidence of [the decision's] pragmatic soundness." Judicial action would be unnecessary, Posner suggested, because the political process could take care of the problem."

As a result, most states changed their eminent domain laws. Prior to the Kelo decision, only seven states specifically prohibited the use of eminent domain for economic development except to eliminate blight. Since the decision, forty-five states have amended their eminent domain laws, although some of these changes are cosmetic.

The New York Times editorial board agreed with the ruling, calling it "a welcome vindication of cities' ability to act in the public interest." The Washington Post's editorial board also agreed with the ruling, writing, "[t]he court's decision was correct. . . . New London's plan, whatever its flaws, is intended to help develop a city that has been in economic decline for many years." However, Reason countered that the New York Times' support of Kelo v. City of New London represents a conflict of interest, as its then-under construction headquarters building was being built on land taken by eminent domain for economic redevelopment.

The Kelo fiasco eventually cost the taxpayers tens of millions of dollars, with nothing to show for it. The "carefully vetted" municipal plans that formed the basis for the Supreme Court's decision proved to be illusory. Eventually, the City of New London extended an apology to Susette Kelo and her neighbors. In 2011, Richard N. Palmer, one of the Connecticut Supreme Court justices who voted with the 4–3 majority for the city, also apologized and said that he should have voted differently. Justice John Paul Stevens did not disavow the decision, but he explained in a speech to a bar association that he thought the use of eminent domain in New London was "unwise." Stevens also admitted that he had incorrectly cited cases as relying on the takings clause, rather than substantive due process, in his majority opinion, a mistake he called "somewhat embarrassing to acknowledge." However, he still believed the opinion was correctly decided.

=== Presidential reaction ===
On June 23, 2006, the first anniversary of the original decision, President George W. Bush issued an executive order instructing the federal government to restrict the use of eminent domain:

...for the purpose of benefiting the general public and not merely for the purpose of advancing the economic interest of private parties to be given ownership or use of the property taken.

However, since eminent domain is most often exercised by local and state governments, the executive order was largely symbolic.

=== Congressional reaction ===
On June 27, 2005, Senator John Cornyn (R-Tex.) introduced legislation, the "Protection of Homes, Small Businesses and Private Property Act of 2005" (S.B. 1313), cosponsored by Bill Nelson (D-Fla.), to limit the use of eminent domain for economic development. The operative language:

1. prohibits the federal government from exercising eminent domain power if the only justifying "public use" is economic development; and
2. imposes the same limit on state and local government exercise of eminent domain power "through the use of Federal funds."

Similar bills have subsequently been put forth in the House of Representatives by Congressman Denny Rehberg (R-Mont.), Tom DeLay (R-Tex.), and John Conyers (D-Mich.) with James Sensenbrenner (R-Wisc.). As some small-scale eminent domain condemnations (including notably those in the Kelo case) can be local in both decision and funding, it is unclear how much of an effect the bill would have if it passed into law. This bill has been reintroduced several times.

Annual appropriations Acts since 2006 have included a general provision stating that federal financial assistance under those appropriations shall not be used to support any Federal, state, or local project that seeks to use the power of eminent domain, unless eminent domain is used only for public use. The appropriations provision further clarifies that a "public use" may shall not be construed to include economic development that primarily benefits private entities.

=== Scholarly reaction ===
In 2008, land use Professor Daniel R. Mandelker argued that the public backlash against Kelo is rooted in the historical deficiencies of urban renewal legislation. In particular, the article cited the failure to incorporate land use planning and a precise definition of blight in urban renewal legislation as problematic. In 2009, Professor Edward J. Lopez of San Jose State University studied passed laws and found that states with more economic freedom, greater value of new housing construction, and less racial and income inequality were more likely to have enacted stronger restrictions sooner.

Severe criticism of the Kelo decision came from Professor Gideon Kanner of the Loyola Law School, Los Angeles. Kanner wrote, "The principal failing of the Kelo decision is that it misreads the case law on which it purports to rely as a seminal precedent, and by its holding frustrates the usual mode of constitutional analysis." He likened the language in the majority's decision ("'public' means 'private' and 'use' means 'purpose,' or 'prognosticated municipal prosperity'") to the abuse of language in George Orwell's Nineteen Eighty-Four.

=== State legislation ===
Prior to Kelo, nine states specifically prohibited the use of eminent domain for economic development except to eliminate blight: Arkansas, Florida, Kansas, Kentucky, Maine, Michigan, New Hampshire, South Carolina and Washington. As of April 2019, 45 states had enacted some type of reform legislation in response to the Kelo decision. Of those states, 22 enacted laws that severely inhibited the takings allowed by the Kelo decision, while the rest enacted laws that place some limits on the power of municipalities to invoke eminent domain for economic development. The remaining five states have not passed laws to limit the power of eminent domain for economic development.

==== Arizona ====
Proposition 207, the Private Property Rights Protection Act, passed in 2006.

==== California ====
Under pre-existing California law, takings (for conveyance to a private party, as opposed to a public use that may incidentally benefit private parties) were already illegal.

Proposition 90 failed in the November 2006 election. The initiative also included language requiring that government pay financial compensation to any property owners who could successfully argue that regulation caused them significant economic loss. Subsequently, Proposition 99 passed in the June 2008 election. It amends the state constitution to prohibit (subject to some exceptions):

state and local governments from using eminent domain to acquire an owner-occupied residence [if the owner has occupied the residence for at least one year], as defined, for conveyance to a private person or business entity.

In 2012, California abolished its redevelopment agencies.

==== Florida ====
Florida passed a 2006 ballot measure amending the Florida Constitution to restrict use of eminent domain. The amendment says in part:

Private property taken by eminent domain [...] may not be conveyed to a natural person or private entity except as provided by general law passed by a three-fifths vote of the membership of each house of the Legislature.

— Fla. Const. art. X, § 6(c)

==== Iowa ====
The Iowa Legislature passed a 2006 bill restricting the use of eminent domain for economic development. Gov. Tom Vilsack (D) vetoed the bill, prompting the first special session of the Iowa Legislature in more than 40 years. The veto was overridden by votes of 90–8 in the Iowa House and 41–8 in the Iowa Senate.

==== Kansas ====
In response to the Kelo decision, the Kansas Legislature enacted K.S.A. 26-501a and K.S.A. 26-501b and amended K.S.A. 26-501.

K.S.A. 26-501a. Eminent domain; limited to public use; transfer to private entity prohibited; exception. On and after July 1, 2007: (a) Private property shall not be taken by eminent domain except for public use and private property shall not be taken without just compensation. (b) The taking of private property by eminent domain for the purpose of selling, leasing or otherwise transferring such property to any private entity is prohibited except as provided in K.S.A. 2009 Supp. 26–501b, and amendments thereto. (c) This section shall be part of and supplemental to the eminent domain procedure act. History: L. 2006, ch. 192, § 1; May 25.

K.S.A. 26-501b. Eminent domain; transfer to private entity authorized, when. On and after July 1, 2007, the taking of private property by eminent domain for the purpose of selling, leasing, or otherwise transferring such property to any private entity is authorized if the taking is: (a) By the Kansas department of transportation or a municipality and the property is deemed excess real property that was taken lawfully and incidental to the acquisition of right-of-way for a public road, bridge or public improvement project including, but not limited to a public building, park, recreation facility, water supply project, wastewater and waste disposal project, storm water project and flood control and drainage project; (b) by any public utility, as defined in K.S.A. 66-104, and amendments thereto, gas gathering service, as defined in K.S.A. 55-1,101, and amendments thereto, pipe-line companies, railroads and all persons and associations of persons, whether incorporated or not, operating such agencies for public use in the conveyance of persons or property within this state, but only to the extent such property is used for the operation of facilities necessary for the provision of services; (c) by any municipality when the private property owner has acquiesced in writing to the taking; (d) by any municipality for the purpose of acquiring property which has defective or unusual conditions of title including, but not limited to, clouded or defective title or unknown ownership interests in the property; (e) by any municipality for the purpose of acquiring property which is unsafe for occupation by humans under the building codes of the jurisdiction where the structure is situated; (f) expressly authorized by the legislature on or after July 1, 2007, by enactment of law that identifies the specific tract or tracts to be taken. If the legislature authorizes eminent domain for private economic development purposes, the legislature shall consider requiring compensation of at least 200% of fair market value to property owners. (g) This section shall be part of and supplemental to the eminent domain procedure act.

==== Michigan ====
Michigan passed a restriction on the use of eminent domain in November 2006, Proposition 4, 80% to 20%. The text of the ballot initiative was as follows:

A proposed constitutional amendment to prohibit government from taking private property by eminent domain for certain private purposes
The proposed constitutional amendment would:

- Prohibit government from taking private property for transfer to another private individual or business for purposes of economic development or increasing tax revenue.
- Provide that if an individual's principal residence is taken by government for public use, the individual must be paid at least 125% of property's fair market value.
- Require government that takes a private property to demonstrate that the taking is for a public use; if taken to eliminate blight, require a higher standard of proof to demonstrate that the taking of that property is for a public use.
- Preserve existing rights of property owners.

==== Minnesota ====
The state restricts eminent domain to public use. Minnesota Statute 117.025 Subd. 11(b) (passed in 2006) clearly states: "The public benefits of economic development, including an increase in tax base, tax revenues, employment, or general economic health, do not by themselves constitute a public use or public purpose."

==== Mississippi ====
On November 8, 2011, Mississippi Initiative #31 restricting eminent domain, was approved by voters 73–27%. The text of Initiative # 31 is as follows:

No property acquired by the exercise of the power of eminent domain under the laws of the State of Mississippi shall, for a period of ten years after its acquisition, be transferred or any interest therein transferred to any person, non-governmental entity, public-private partnership, corporation, or other business entity with the following exceptions:

(1) The above provisions shall not apply to drainage and levee facilities and usage, roads and bridges for public conveyance, flood control projects with a levee component, seawalls, dams, toll roads, public airports, public ports, public harbors, public wayports, common carriers or facilities for public utilities and other entities used in the generation, transmission, storage or distribution of telephone, telecommunication, gas, carbon dioxide, electricity, water, sewer, natural gas, liquid hydrocarbons or other utility products.

(2) The above provisions shall not apply where the use of eminent domain (a) removes a public nuisance; (b) removes a structure that is beyond repair or unfit for human habitation or use; (c) is used to acquire abandoned property; or (d) eliminates a direct threat to public health or safety caused by the property in its current condition.

==== Nevada ====
On November 25, 2008, a voter-approved amendment to the Nevada constitution, colloquially titled the People's Initiative to Stop the Taking of Our Land, or PISTOL, was put into effect following its review by the Nevada State Supreme Court. Among other provisions, the amendment included the following text:

Public use shall not include the direct or indirect transfer of any interest in property taken in an eminent domain proceeding from one private party to another private party. In all eminent domain actions, the government shall have the burden to prove public use.

The amendment also modifies the definition of "fair market value"—used to determine the monetary compensation a property owner receives—to represent the highest value the property would be sold for on the open market and returns seized property to the original property owner "if the property is not used within five years for the original purpose stated by the government."

==== New Hampshire ====
In New Hampshire, various libertarian activists, in response to the decision, sought to use eminent domain to seize Justice David Souter's farmhouse in Weare, New Hampshire, and build a hotel (the "Lost Liberty Hotel") on the site. The proposal was not supported by the town's five-member board of selectmen, and Weare voters rejected the activists' attempt to place a proposal on the local ballot to seize Souter's farm.

In 2006, the New Hampshire Legislature proposed an amendment to the state constitution providing that "no part of a person's property shall be taken by eminent domain and transferred, directly or indirectly, to another person if the taking is for the purpose of private development or other private use of the property." The amendment was overwhelmingly approved by New Hampshire voters in the November 2006 elections. Some New Hampshire commentators suggested that the state had gone too far in restricting the exercise of eminent domain in the Kelo backlash.

==== Ohio ====
An attempted use of eminent domain was brought before the Ohio Supreme Court in City of Norwood v. Horney. In July 2006, the Supreme Court of Ohio unanimously held in favor of the property owners, finding the seizure would violate the Constitution of Ohio.

==== Virginia ====
In 2012, the Virginia General Assembly approved a ballot measure for the November general election that would amend the state constitution to greatly restrict the government's ability to condemn land for private benefit. The measure succeeded with nearly 75% of the electorate in support of the eminent domain reform. The reform resulted in an amendment to Virginia's Bill of Rights seeking to prevent a situation like Kelo which read in part: "a taking or damaging of private property is not for public use if the primary use is for private gain, private benefit, private enterprise, increasing jobs, increasing tax revenue, or economic development, except for the elimination of a public nuisance existing on the property. The condemnor bears the burden of proving that the use is public, without a presumption that it is."

==== Wisconsin ====
On March 29, 2006, Gov. Jim Doyle signed into law 2005 Wisconsin Act 233, which prohibits condemnation of nonblighted property for transfer to a private entity. Nonblighted property is defined by a list of conditions that may make the property a detriment to the "public health, safety, or welfare." Two days earlier the governor signed into law 2005 Wisconsin Act 208, which creates procedures designed to protect property owners including public notice and public hearing requirements.

The Wisconsin law has been criticized as one having little or no real protection for property owners because it provides protection against property condemnation for economic development but does allow property condemnation under a broadly defined description of blighted.

== State supreme courts ==
Since Kelo was handed down, several state supreme courts have rejected the Kelo decision limiting the use of eminent domain. These include Iowa, Ohio, Oklahoma, and South Dakota.

== Legacy ==
Jeff Benedict wrote an account of the case in a 2009 book, Little Pink House: A True Story of Defiance and Courage. Benedict's account was adapted into a film, Little Pink House, released in 2018.

== See also ==
- Lost Liberty Hotel
- Constitution Park
- Claire Gaudiani
