= Wesley W. Horton =

American lawyer

- Born: Wesley Wells Horton; April 16, 1942 (age 83); Hartford, Connecticut
- Education: Harvard College (B.A.); University of Connecticut School of Law (J.D.)
- Occupation: lawyer

Wesley Wells Horton (born April 16, 1942, in Hartford, Connecticut) is a Connecticut appellate lawyer. He is currently Of Counsel at McElroy, Deutsch, Mulvaney & Carpenter, LLP. In 2005, he successfully represented the City of New London in Kelo v. New London before the U.S. Supreme Court.

Horton received his B.A. from Harvard College in 1964 and his J.D. from the University of Connecticut School of Law in 1970. Before entering private practice, he served as a law clerk for Justice Charles House of the Connecticut Supreme Court from 1970 to 1971. Horton researched and prepared the plaintiffs' position in the landmark school finance case Horton v. Meskill on behalf of his son Barnaby, the lead plaintiff. Within Connecticut, and prior to Kelo, Horton was known for his groundbreaking win in Sheff v. O'Neill. In Sheff, Horton successfully persuaded the Connecticut Supreme Court that education was a fundamental right under the Connecticut Constitution and that de facto segregation in schools violated this right.

Horton has authored scholarly books chronicling the history of the Connecticut Supreme Court (2008) and the Connecticut Constitution (2012), the former with the assistance of attorneys Brendon P. Levesque and Jeffrey White.
