= Andrew J. McDonald =

American judge (born 1966)

Andrew McDonald
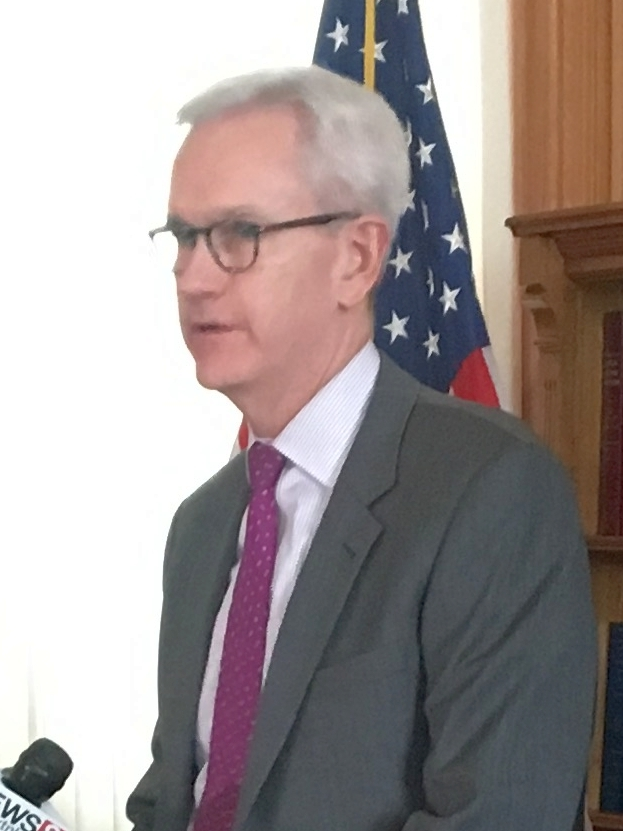
- McDonald in 2018

Chief Justice of the Connecticut Supreme Court
- Acting
- In office September 6, 2024 – September 30, 2024
- Preceded by: Richard A. Robinson
- Succeeded by: Raheem L. Mullins

Associate Justice of the Connecticut Supreme Court
- Incumbent
- Assumed office January 24, 2013
- Appointed by: Dannel Malloy
- Preceded by: Lubbie Harper

Member of the Connecticut Senate from the 27th district
- In office January 2003 – January 2011
- Preceded by: George Jepsen
- Succeeded by: Carlo Leone

Personal details
- Born: March 11, 1966 (age 60) Stamford, Connecticut, U.S.
- Party: Democratic
- Spouse: Charles Gray
- Education: Cornell University (BA); University of Connecticut, Hartford (JD)

Andrew J. McDonald (born March 11, 1966) is an American judge and former politician from Connecticut. He has served as an associate justice of the Connecticut Supreme Court since 2013. He served as acting chief justice in September 2024, after the retirement of then-Chief Justice Richard A. Robinson.

He previously served as a member of the Connecticut Senate from 2003 to 2011, representing the state's 27th district in Stamford and Darien as a Democrat. McDonald resigned from the legislature on January 4, 2011, to serve as Governor Dan Malloy's chief legal counsel, a post he left to join the bench.

== Early life and career ==
A Stamford native, McDonald is the son of Alex and Anne McDonald. His mother was a sixth-grade teacher who represented Stamford in the Connecticut House of Representatives from 1991 to 2003.

McDonald was educated at the Stamford Public Schools (Stark, Dolan and Stamford High School), and completed a Bachelor's degree in Government from Cornell University. He completed a Juris Doctor at the University of Connecticut School of Law in 1991, and served as managing editor of the Connecticut Journal of International Law.

McDonald was a litigation partner with Pullman & Comley, LLC, in Stamford from 1991. He also worked as Director of Legal Affairs for the City of Stamford from 1999 to 2002. McDonald also served on the Stamford Board of Finance from 1995 to 1999, as the board's chairman from 1997 to 1999, and as co-chair of the Audit Committee from 1995 to 1997. He served on the Stamford Board of Representatives from the Cove from 1993 to 1995.

== Political career ==
McDonald narrowly won election to the Connecticut State Senate in 2002, defeating his Republican opponent, Michael Fedele (who later served as Lieutenant Governor), by 53% to 47%. He was re-elected in 2004, 2006, 2008 and 2010. He served as Deputy Majority Leader and as Senate Chair of the Judiciary Committee.

In 2006 and 2007 McDonald challenged the decision of Connecticut Chief Justice William J. Sullivan to delay publication of a court decision in an effort to promote the chief justice candidacy of his colleague, Justice Peter T. Zarella. Sullivan challenged the power of a legislator to subpoena him to appear at a hearing, which led to a court challenge.

In 2007 McDonald opposed a special session of the General Assembly to address parole issues following the horrific home invasion murders in Cheshire, stating "Legislating by bumper sticker motto is not the way to go." Other Democrats were more willing to respond as Congressman Chris Murphy proposal making home invasion a federal crime.

McDonald relented under public pressure and a special session was held January 22, 2008, to pass laws declaring home invasion a class A felony and reforming the parole board. McDonald opposed a Three Strikes Law favored by Governor Jodi Rell to mandate life terms to career violent criminals; that measure failed to pass.

Rell reiterated her call for a Three Strikes bill on March 31, 2008, following the kidnapping and murder of an elderly New Britain woman committed by a sex offender recently released from Connecticut prison. Following the New Britain crime, McDonald lambasted the prosecutor who had handled the assailant's previous case, Waterbury State's Attorney John Connelly, who had agreed to a plea bargain which sentenced the defendant to an eight-year prison term. Defense lawyer Norm Pattis called McDonald a "knucklehead" for attacking Connelly as soft on crime, noting Connelly was responsible for most of the death penalty convictions in Connecticut.

In March 2009, McDonald and Judiciary committee co-chair Mike Lawlor proposed a bill (SB 1098) to regulate the management of Roman Catholic parishes in Connecticut. Opponents charged the bill would violate the separation of church and state clause in the First Amendment.

== Judicial career ==
After two years of serving as Governor Dan Malloy's chief legal counsel, McDonald was nominated to a seat on the Connecticut Supreme Court on December 27, 2012. His nomination required the approval of the Connecticut General Assembly. The Joint Committee on Judiciary of the Connecticut General Assembly approved his nomination by a vote of 40–2 on January 14, 2013. On January 23, his nomination won the approval of the Senate by a vote of 30–3 and of the House by a vote of 125–20. He took his seat on the bench the following day.

In November 2017, the chief justice of Connecticut Chase T. Rogers announced that she would retire in February 2018. Governor Malloy announced on January 8, 2018, that he had nominated McDonald to be the next Chief Justice, to succeed Rogers. However, in March 2018, McDonald's nomination was rejected by the Connecticut Senate in a 19–16 vote, with all 18 Republican state senators voting no. If confirmed, McDonald would have been the first openly gay person to serve as chief justice of a U.S. state supreme court. Governor Malloy subsequently nominated justice Richard A. Robinson to be chief justice, instead of McDonald.

== Personal life ==
McDonald is gay. His campaigns have won the backing of the Gay & Lesbian Victory Fund. McDonald married Charles Gray in 2009. As of 2021, He is one of eleven LGBT state supreme court justices serving in the United States.

== See also ==
- List of LGBT jurists in the United States
- List of LGBT state supreme court justices in the United States

Legal offices
Preceded by Lubbie Harper	Associate Justice of the Connecticut Supreme Court; 2013–present	Incumbent
Preceded by Richard A. Robinson	Chief Justice of the Connecticut Supreme Court; Acting; 2024	Succeeded by Raheem L. Mullins
