= Richard A. Robinson =

American judge (born 1957)

Richard Robinson
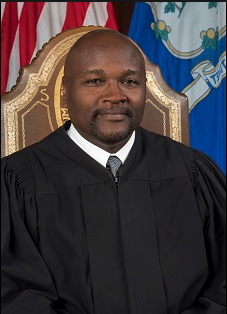

Chief Justice of the Connecticut Supreme Court
- In office May 3, 2018 – September 6, 2024
- Appointed by: Dannel Malloy
- Preceded by: Chase T. Rogers
- Succeeded by: Andrew J. McDonald (acting)

Associate Justice of the Connecticut Supreme Court
- In office December 19, 2013 – May 3, 2018
- Appointed by: Dannel Malloy
- Preceded by: Flemming L. Norcott Jr.
- Succeeded by: Steven D. Ecker

Personal details
- Born: December 10, 1957 (age 68) Stamford, Connecticut, U.S.
- Education: University of Connecticut, Storrs (BA); West Virginia University (JD)

Richard A. Robinson (born December 10, 1957) is an American lawyer who is a former member of the Connecticut Supreme Court. He served as chief justice from 2018 to 2024, and as an associate justice of the court from 2013 to 2018.

== Life and career ==
Robinson was born in Stamford, Connecticut. He received a Bachelor of Arts from the University of Connecticut in 1979 and a Juris Doctor from the West Virginia University College of Law in 1984. He was staff counsel for the City of Stamford Law Department from 1985 to 1988, when he became assistant corporation counsel in Stamford.

In 2000, Robinson was appointed to the Connecticut Superior Court, serving until his appointment to the Connecticut Appellate Court on December 10, 2007. He was appointed to the Connecticut Supreme Court on December 19, 2013.

In November 2017, the Chief Justice Chase T. Rogers announced that she would retire in February 2018. Governor Dannel Malloy nominated Justice Andrew J. McDonald to be the next chief justice, but his nomination was rejected by the Connecticut Senate. In April 2018, Governor Malloy nominated Robinson to be chief justice of Connecticut. Robinson was sworn in as chief justice on June 18, 2018. He is the first African-American chief justice in Connecticut's history. On May 21, 2024, Chief Justice Robinson announced that he intended to retire from his role as Chief Justice in September. He retired from active service on September 6, 2024.

== See also ==
- List of African-American jurists
- List of justices of the Connecticut Supreme Court

Legal offices
Preceded by Flemming L. Norcott Jr.	Associate Justice of the Connecticut Supreme Court; 2013–2018	Succeeded by Steven D. Ecker
Preceded by Richard N. Palmer	Chief Justice of the Connecticut Supreme Court; 2018–2024	Succeeded by Andrew J. McDonald; Acting
