= Gregory D'Auria =

American judge (born 1963)

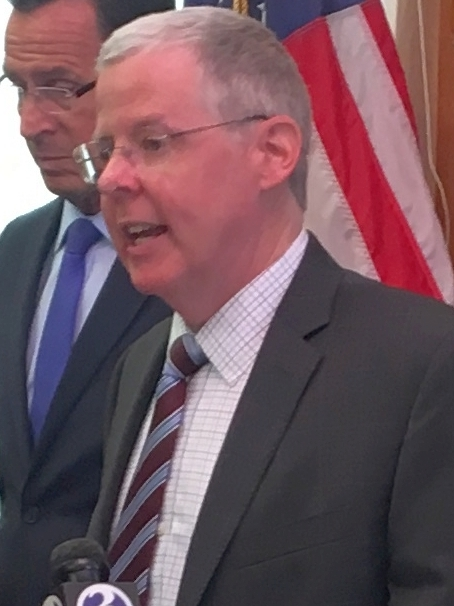

Associate Justice of the Connecticut Supreme Court
- Incumbent
- Assumed office April 10, 2017
- Appointed by: Dannel Malloy
- Preceded by: Peter T. Zarella

Personal details
- Born: June 24, 1963 (age 63) Hartford, Connecticut, U.S.
- Education: University of Connecticut (BA, JD)

Gregory Thomas D'Auria (born June 24, 1963) is an American lawyer and judge who has served as an associate justice of the Connecticut Supreme Court since 2017. He previously was Solicitor General of Connecticut.

== Life ==
Born and raised in Connecticut, D'Auria completed a bachelor's degree at the University of Connecticut in 1985, with a major in political science. He completed a J.D. degree in 1988 at the University of Connecticut School of Law, where he was editor-in-chief of the Connecticut Journal of International Law. D'Auria clerked for Connecticut Supreme Court Chief Justice Ellen Ash Peters in 1988–1989, and then worked for four years as an associate attorney at the law firm Shipman & Goodwin.

D'Auria was hired by Connecticut Attorney General Richard Blumenthal in 1993, and worked in the Attorney General's Office until 2011. He was an Assistant Attorney General in 1993–2000, served as Associate Attorney General for Litigation until 2009, and then headed the Special Litigation and Charities Unit.

Connecticut Attorney General George Jepsen appointed D'Auria as Solicitor General of Connecticut in 2011. In this job, D'Auria argued more than 90 cases on behalf of the state before the state supreme court and Connecticut Appellate Court. D'Auria has a son David, Thomas and Cameron.

== Judicial career ==
On February 1, 2017, D'Auria was nominated by Governor Dan Malloy to a seat on the Connecticut Supreme Court, to replace retired associate justice Peter T. Zarella. D'Auria was unanimously approved by the judiciary committee of the Connecticut General Assembly on February 17, and was unanimously confirmed by the Assembly as a whole on March 8, 2017.

D'Auria was sworn in by Governor Malloy as an associate justice on April 10, 2017, to an eight-year term which expires in 2025.

Legal offices
Preceded by Peter T. Zarella	Associate Justice of the Connecticut Supreme Court; 2017–present	Incumbent
