= Kerrigan v. Commissioner of Public Health =

2008 case that legalized same-sex marriage in Connecticut, US

- Court: Connecticut Supreme Court
- Full case name: Elizabeth Kerrigan et al. v. Commissioner of Public Health et al.
- Argued: May 14, 2007
- Decided: October 10, 2008
- Citation: 289 Conn. 135, 957 A.2d 407, (Conn 2007)

Holding
- Denying same-sex couples marriage licenses violated the equality and liberty provisions of the Connecticut Constitution.

Court membership
- Judges sitting: Chase T. Rogers (recused), (Note: Rogers recused herself after husband's law firm filed an amicus brief in the case. Senior Justice William J. Sullivan had first replaced Chase and then recused himself to be replaced by Harper.) David M. Borden, Joette Katz, Flemming L. Norcott, Jr., Richard N. Palmer, Christine S. Vertefeuille, Peter T. Zarella, Lubbie Harper Jr. (assigned to participate)

Case opinions
- Majority: Palmer, joined by Harper, Katz, Norcott
- Dissent: Borden
- Dissent: Vertefeuille
- Dissent: Zarella
- Rogers took no part in the consideration or decision of the case.

Laws applied
- Conn. Consti. Article first, § 1, § 8, § 10, § 20, General Statutes § 46b-38nn

Kerrigan v. Commissioner of Public Health, 289 Conn. 135, 957 A.2d 407, is a 2008 decision by the Connecticut Supreme Court holding that allowing same-sex couples to form same-sex unions but not marriages violates the Connecticut Constitution. It was the third time that a ruling by the highest court of a U.S. state legalized same-sex marriage, following Massachusetts in Goodridge v. Department of Public Health (2003) and California in In re Marriage Cases (2008). The decision legalized same-sex marriage in Connecticut when it came into effect on November 12, 2008. There were no attempts made to amend the state constitution to overrule the decision, and gender-neutral marriage statutes were passed into law in 2009.

== Background ==
Connecticut had a relatively liberal record on the question of rights for gays and lesbians. It had repealed its law criminalizing consensual sodomy in 1969, banned discrimination based on sexual orientation in 1991, and authorized second-parent adoptions in 2000.

In response to an inquiry from officials of two Connecticut towns asking whether they could issue marriage licenses to same-sex couples, Attorney General Richard Blumenthal wrote on May 17, 2004, the day that same-sex marriage became legal in Massachusetts:

I have concluded that the Connecticut Legislature has not authorized the issuance of a Connecticut marriage license to a same-sex couple.... I can reach no conclusion on whether a Connecticut court would hold that limiting the status of marriage to opposite-sex couples violates constitutional standards. Ultimately, the courts will have the final say.... [O]ur marriage statutes enjoy a presumption of constitutionality.

== Lawsuit ==
On August 25, 2004, Gay and Lesbian Advocates and Defenders (GLAD) filed a lawsuit, led by attorney Bennett Klein, on behalf of seven (later eight) Connecticut same-sex couples in State Superior Court, challenging the state's denial of the right to marry to same-sex couples. All had been denied marriage licenses in Madison and several were raising children. (Note: At the time of the final decision in the case, the eight couples had 14 children.) They argued that this violated the equality and liberty provisions of the Connecticut Constitution. Attorney General Blumenthal said: "The question is whether there's a denial of equal protection of the law. My job is to defend the statutes whether I like them or not, and we do that as vigorously and as zealously as we can." The Family Institute of Connecticut asked to be allowed to intervene to defend the suit, but Judge Patty Jenkins Pittman denied that request and her decision was upheld on appeal.

In October 2005, the Connecticut civil unions statute took effect. It was designed to provide same-sex couples with all the benefits and responsibilities of marriage, but it made explicit for the first time in Connecticut that marriage was the union of a man and a woman. The plaintiffs filed an amendment complaint focusing on the distinction between marriage and civil unions.

The court heard oral argument on March 21, 2006. On July 12, 2006, Judge Pittman ruled against the plaintiffs. She called the state's recent establishment of civil unions "courageous and historic". She found no meaningful distinction between marriages and civil unions except for the provision of benefits by the federal government, which did not implicate the state. She wrote:

Civil union and marriage in Connecticut now share the same benefits, protections and responsibilities under law. ... The Connecticut Constitution requires that there be equal protection and due process of law, not that there be equivalent nomenclature for such protection and process.

She noted that "the plaintiffs may feel themselves to be relegated to a second class status, [but] there is nothing in the text of the Connecticut statutes that can be read to place the plaintiffs there." She also described the court's "very limited authority to interfere with the determination of the General Assembly", i.e., the legislature, which she called "the arbiter of public policy".

== Decision ==
The Supreme Court of Connecticut heard the appeal by the plaintiffs on May 14, 2007. Jane R. Rosenberg, representing the Attorney General, told the Court: "We're not talking about granting rights and benefits; we're talking about a word." Bennett Klein, representing the plaintiffs, called civil unions "a less prestigious, less advantageous, institution". When Klein argued that same-sex marriage was a fundamental right and guaranteed by the state constitution's ban on sex-based discrimination, Justice David M. Borden told him he was "riding two horses". Much of the argument concerned whether the Court needed to treat sexual orientation as a "suspect class", a category that would require the state to meet a higher standard for treating them as a class apart. Part of that argument addressed whether gays and lesbians can be termed "politically powerless". When Rosenberg pointed to their recent "significant advances" and suggested the trend would continue, Justice Richard N. Palmer asked: "Is that your argument—give them more time and they'll do better?" The Justices also referenced recent activity in the legislature, where a week earlier the judiciary committee had endorsed same-sex marriage by a vote of 27–15, surprising legislators who then prevailed upon the bill's sponsors to delay its consideration.

The Court issued its opinion on October 10, 2008. The Court ruled 4-3 that denying same-sex couples the right to marry, even granted them a parallel status under another name like civil unions, violated the equality and liberty provisions of the Connecticut Constitution.

Justice Richard N. Palmer wrote for the majority, joined by Justices Joette Katz, Flemming L. Norcott, Jr., and Connecticut Appellate Court Judge Lubbie Harper Jr. (who replaced the recused Chief Justice Chase T. Rogers). The Court found a substantial difference between marriages and civil unions:

Although marriage and civil unions do embody the same legal rights under our law, they are by no means equal. The former is an institution of transcendent historical, cultural and social significance, whereas the latter is not....

There is no doubt that civil unions enjoy a lesser status in our society than marriage. Ultimately, the message of the civil unions law is that what same-sex couples have is not as important or as significant as real marriage.

The ruling was scheduled to take effect on October 28. It was the first ruling by a state's highest court that found allowing same-sex couples their own marriage-like status, in this case civil unions, failing to meet the state constitution's equal protection standard. At the time, three states had civil unions (Vermont, New Hampshire and New Jersey) and four had domestic partnerships (Maine, Washington, Oregon and Hawaii).

Justices David M. Borden, Christine S. Vertefeuille, and Peter T. Zarella each field a dissent. Borden wrote that civil unions deserved more time: "Our experience with civil unions is simply too new and the views of the people of our state about it as a social institution are too much in flux to say with any certitude that the marriage statute must be struck down". Zarella found procreation a sufficient rationale for restricting marriage to different-sex couples: "The ancient definition of marriage as the union of one man and one woman has its basis in biology, not bigotry. The fact that same sex couples cannot engage in sexual conduct of a type that can result in the birth of a child is a critical difference in this context."

Governor Jodi Rell said that she would enforce the decision even though she disagreed with it. She said: "The Supreme Court has spoken. I do not believe their voice reflects the majority of the people of Connecticut. However, I am also firmly convinced that attempts to reverse this decision, either legislatively or by amending the state Constitution, will not meet with success." Peter Wolfgang, executive director of the Family Institute of Connecticut, called the judges "robed masters" and "philosopher kings". He said: "It's an outrage, but not an unexpected outrage. We have thought all along that this court would usurp democracy and impose same-sex marriage by judicial fiat." To counter the decision, he said Connecticut voters needed to support a proposal on the November 4 ballot to call a constitutional convention, which could lead to a popular vote on same-sex marriage. Voters rejected the call for a convention, with over 59% of voters voting no.

== Marriages ==
On November 12, 2008, the first marriage licenses were issued to same-sex couples in Connecticut. Since California voters had passed a ban on same-sex marriage a few days earlier, Connecticut joined Massachusetts as the only other state licensing same-sex marriages.

In the three years between the time civil unions became available in Connecticut and the first same-sex marriages there, approximately 1,800 couples established civil unions.

In the first year that marriage license were available to them, 1,746 same-sex couples married in Connecticut.

== See also ==
- Baker v. Vermont, 744 A.2d 864 (Vt. 1999)
- Lewis v. Harris, 188 N.J. 415 (N.J. 2006)
- Varnum v. Brien, 763 N.W.2d 862 (Iowa 2009)
- Same-sex marriage in Connecticut
