= Flemming L. Norcott Jr. =

American judge

Flemming L. Norcott Jr. (born October 11, 1943) is a former Associate Justice of the Connecticut Supreme Court. He was appointed to the Connecticut Superior Court in 1979 and remained there until his elevation to the Connecticut Appellate Court in 1987. He was appointed to the Connecticut Supreme Court in 1992, to a seat vacated by the retirement of Justice David M. Shea. He also serves as Associate Fellow of Calhoun College at Yale University, as well as a lecturer. Justice Norcott received a Bachelor of Arts degree from Columbia University in 1965 and a Juris Doctor degree from Columbia Law School in 1968. He was born in New Haven, Connecticut.

== Notable Decisions ==
Sheff v. O'Neill is a landmark 1996 Connecticut Supreme Court decision regarding civil rights and the right to education. The Court ruled that the state had an affirmative obligation to provide Connecticut's school children with a substantially equal educational opportunity and that this constitutionally guaranteed right encompasses the access to a public education which is not substantially and materially impaired by racial and ethnic isolation. This was a split 4-3 decision, which was authored by Chief Justice Ellen Ash Peters. She was joined in the majority opinion by Justices Robert Berdon, Norcott, and Joette Katz. Justice David Borden authored the dissent, with Justices Robert Callahan and Richard Palmer concurring with the dissent.

Justice Norcott authored the majority opinion in the controversial 2004 Kelo v. New London case related to eminent domain. He was joined by Justices David Borden, Richard Palmer and Christine Vertefeuille. The dissent was written by Justice Peter T. Zarella and joined by Chief Justice William J. Sullivan and Justice Joette Katz. The majority opinion was subsequently upheld by the United States Supreme Court.

On October 10, 2008, the Connecticut Supreme Court ruled in Kerrigan v. Commissioner of Public Health that gay and lesbian couples could not be denied the right to marry because of the Equal Protection Clause of the state constitution. This decision made Connecticut the third state (along with Massachusetts and California) to legalize same-sex marriage through judicial decree of the state supreme court. The majority opinion was written by Justice Richard N. Palmer, and joined by Justices Norcott, Joette Katz, and Judge Lubbie Harper Jr.; Justices Peter T. Zarella, Christine S. Vertefeuille, and David Borden dissented.

Most recently, Justice Norcott wrote the Court's opinion in Bysiewicz v. DiNardo, holding that Secretary of State Susan Bysiewicz did not fulfill the statutory prerequisite of 10 years of service as an attorney to run for Attorney General.
