= Edward Lopez =

Edward Lopez may refer to:

- Edward J. Lopez, American economist
- R. Edward Lopez (1953–2005), American newsman and morning radio personality
