= David M. Borden =

American judge (1937–2016)

- Portrait of Borden

Connecticut Supreme Court Justice
- In office 1990–2007
- Nominated by: Governor William A. O'Neill

Personal details
- Born: August 4, 1937 Hartford, Connecticut, U.S.
- Died: August 7, 2016 (aged 79)
- Education: Amherst College (BA); Harvard University (LLB)

David M. Borden (August 4, 1937 – August 7, 2016) was a Connecticut Supreme Court Justice from 1990 to 2007.

== Early life and education ==
Borden was born in Hartford, Connecticut, in 1937. He received his Bachelor of Arts degree from Amherst College in 1959 and his Bachelor of Laws degree from Harvard Law School in 1962.

== Private legal practice ==
Upon graduating, he entered private practice in Hartford, Connecticut, in 1962 and continued until 1977.

== Judicial career ==
Borden played an important role in reforming the Connecticut judiciary, serving as executive director of the Commission to Revise the Criminal Statutes of the State of Connecticut from 1963 to 1971 and as principal architect of the 1969 Connecticut Penal Code. Judge Borden also served as Chief Counsel to the Joint Committee on the Judiciary (of the State of Connecticut), as judge of the Court of Common Pleas from 1977 to 1978, and as judge of the Superior Court from 1978 to 1983. Additionally, he was president of the Connecticut Judges Association from 1981 to 1983.

In 1983, following a reorganization of the Connecticut court system, Borden became one of the six original judges of the Connecticut Appellate Court.

=== Connecticut Supreme Court ===
Seven years later, in 1990, he was nominated to succeed Justice Arthur H. Healty on the Connecticut Supreme Court by Governor William A. O'Neill, a position he held until his retirement in 2007. Prior to his mandatory retirement at age 70, Borden was the Acting Chief Justice of the Supreme Court, following the resignation of Chief Justice William J. Sullivan, who stepped down after it was revealed he delayed the release of an unpopular decision regarding the state's Freedom of Information Commission so that his chosen successor, Justice Zarrella, would be elevated to the Court's top position. As acting Chief Justice, Borden formed the Public Access Task Force, composed of judges, journalists, and attorneys to develop recommendations to ensure the Court's openness. Borden accepted most of the Task Force's recommendations, which have expanded transparency of court proceedings in Connecticut and replicated in other state Supreme Courts. The Task Force was chaired by Justice Richard N. Palmer who co-authored a letter with Borden outlining their concerns about then-Chief Justice Sullivan's apparently deliberate decision to delay release of the FOI case, Clerk of GA7. Borden authored a dissent in that opinion, joined by Justices Norcott and Katz.

During his tenure as Associate Justice of the Supreme Court, he chaired several committees charged with further revising the Connecticut penal system. From 1992 to 2001, he served as Chairperson of the Rules Committee of the Judges of the Superior Court. He was also Chairperson of the Connecticut Law Revision Commission Task Force which was responsible for codifying the Connecticut Law of Evidence. This codification was later adopted as Connecticut Evidence Code. Justice Borden was appointed Chairman of the Connecticut Sentencing Commission by Chief Justice Chase T. Rogers in 2013 and served in this capacity until his death in 2016. During his tenure as Chair, Justice Borden was dedicated to the reform of Connecticut's juvenile sentencing scheme. Justice Borden was instrumental in both the development and passage of the Commission's recommendation to align Connecticut law with the United States Supreme Court's decisions in Miller v. Alabama and Graham v. Florida.

=== Notable decisions ===
One notable decision Borden authored was State v. Cobb (251 Conn. 285, 1999). There the Connecticut Supreme Court upheld Sedrick Cobb's death sentence for the 1989 sexual assault and murder of Julia Ashe in Waterbury against a total of forty-five challenges. The Connecticut Supreme Court also upheld the sentence despite Justice Robert I. Berdon's dissent where he made a revelation about the Court's conference. Berdon claimed that the Court had failed to engage in its statutorily-mandated duty to determine if sentences were the product of untoward passion.

Borden was the author of State v. Ledbetter (275 Conn. 534, 881 A. 2d 290 (2005)), a landmark decision on eyewitness identification law in Connecticut. In 2011, he became the Chair of the Connecticut Legislature's Eyewitness Identification Task Force, which supported the adoption of double-blind, sequential identification procedures, improved training, and statewide standards for identification procedures.

On October 10, 2008, Bordon dissented in the case of Kerrigan v. Commissioner of Public Health, in which the court held that gay and lesbian couples could not be denied the right to marry because of the Equal Protection Clause of the state constitution. This decision made Connecticut the third state (along with Massachusetts and California) to legalize same-sex marriage through judicial decree of the state supreme court.

== Teaching, writing and other activities ==
In addition to his duties as a Connecticut jurist, Borden taught at the University of Connecticut School of Law and co-authored three books: Connecticut Criminal Jury Instructions, Superior Court Criminal Rules, and Connecticut Criminal Law.

Borden also served as a member of the Board of Directors of the Hartford Foundation for Public Giving, and screened criminal cases for transfer to the Supreme Court. He died on August 7, 2016, from pancreatic cancer at the age of 79.
