= Joette Katz =

American judge (born 1953)

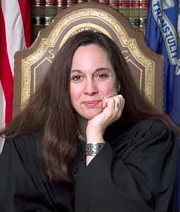
- Justice Katz in 2008

Commissioner of the Connecticut Department of Children and Families
- In office February 4, 2011 – January 9, 2019
- Governor: Dan Malloy
- Preceded by: Susan Hamilton
- Succeeded by: Vanessa Dorantes

Associate Justice of the Connecticut Supreme Court
- In office 1992–2011
- Nominated by: Lowell P. Weicker Jr.

Personal details
- Born: February 3, 1953 (age 73) Brooklyn, New York
- Spouse: Philip Rubin
- Education: Brandeis University; University of Connecticut School of Law

Joette Katz (born February 3, 1953) is an American attorney and a partner at the law firm Shipman & Goodwin LLP . She was an associate justice of the Connecticut Supreme Court, where she also served as the administrative judge for the state appellate system. Later, she served as a Commissioner of the Connecticut Department of Children and Families. In various roles during her career she has had an impact on issues of state and national importance, such as: criminal law, capital punishment, civil rights and the right to education, eminent domain, same-sex marriage, LGBTQ rights, sexual assault, sex trafficking, and transitioning children in state care from institutions to families.

== Early life and family ==
Katz was born and raised in Brooklyn, New York. Her parents were Harry and Sayre Katz. She lives in Fairfield, Connecticut, and is married to Philip Rubin, CEO emeritus of Haskins Laboratories and a former White House science advisor. They have two children: Jason Rubin and Samantha Katz.

== Education and legal training ==
Katz went to high school at the Berkeley Institute in Brooklyn (now known as the Berkeley Carroll School). She received a Bachelor of Arts degree, graduating cum laude, in 1974 from Brandeis University, and her J.D. degree, graduating cum laude, from the University of Connecticut School of Law in 1977.

== Early professional career ==
Katz started her professional career in 1977 as an attorney at the law firm of Winnick, Vine and Welch (now Winnick, Vine, Welch & Teodosio ) in Shelton, Connecticut. From 1978 to 1981, she was an assistant public defender in the appellate unit of the office of the Chief Public Defender in New Haven, Connecticut. From 1981 to 1983, she was an assistant public defender in the trial unit in Bridgeport, Connecticut. She served as Chief of Legal Services for the Office of the Chief Public Defender from 1983 to 1989 and was the first woman to serve in this role in Connecticut.

== Judicial career ==
Katz was nominated for the Superior Court bench by Gov. William A. O'Neill in 1989. She was elevated to the state Supreme Court by Gov. Lowell P. Weicker Jr. in 1992. Her appointment at age 39 made her, at the time, the youngest justice ever appointed to the Connecticut Supreme Court. She was reappointed by Gov. John G. Rowland in 2001 and Gov. M. Jodi Rell in 2009. She was the first public defender to serve on the Connecticut Supreme Court and the second woman to serve on the court after Justice Ellen Ash Peters. From 2006 until her resignation on January 5, 2011, she also served as the administrative judge for the state appellate system, a position she had previously held from 1994 to 2000. She was the first woman to serve in this position.

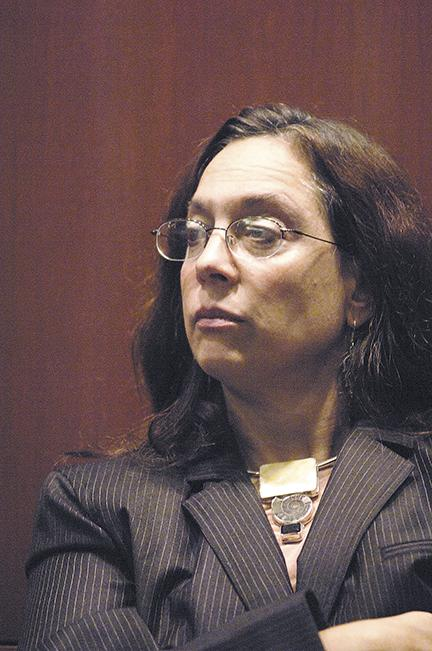
Katz in 2009

== Notable cases and opinions ==
During her 18+ years as an associate justice of the Connecticut Supreme Court, Justice Katz sat on approximately 2,500 cases and authored nearly 500 opinions. Some notable and/or controversial opinions and cases include:

- Sheff v. O'Neill, 238 Conn. 1, 678 A.2d 1267 (1996). Sheff v. O'Neill is a landmark 1996 Connecticut Supreme Court decision regarding civil rights and the right to education. The Court ruled that the state had an affirmative obligation to provide Connecticut's schoolchildren with a substantially equal educational opportunity and that this constitutionally guaranteed right encompasses access to a public education that is not substantially and materially impaired by racial and ethnic isolation. This was a split 4-3 decision which was authored by Chief Justice Ellen Ash Peters. She was joined in the majority opinion by Justice Robert Berdon, Justice Flemming L. Norcott Jr., and Justice Joette Katz. Justice David Borden authored the dissent, with Justices Robert Callahan and Richard Palmer concurring with the dissent.
- State v. Johnson, 253 Conn. 1, 751 A.2d 298 (2000). Katz authored the majority opinion in this controversial case. The decision said that the shooting of a state trooper did not meet the statutory standard for "especially cruel or heinous." As a result, the death penalty was overturned and the sentence was eventually changed to life without parole. While the Court claimed it was following the intent of the legislature, this decision and a subsequent death penalty decision State v. Courchesne, led the General Assembly to pass a "plain meaning" statute regarding statutory interpretation.
- Kelo v. New London, 268 Conn. 1 (2004). Justice Katz joined the minority in the Kelo v. New London case heard by the Connecticut Supreme Court (2004), which was appealed to the U.S. Supreme Court. In the Connecticut case, the majority sided with the city in an en banc 4-3 decision, with the opinion authored by Justice Norcott and joined by Justices Borden, Palmer, and Vertefeuille. The dissent was authored by Justice Zarella (joined by Justices Sullivan and Katz). The U.S. Supreme Court upheld the Connecticut Supreme Court's decision in favor of the city, in a 5–4 decision, with the dissent written by Justice O'Connor and joined by Chief Justice Rehnquist, and Justices Scalia and Thomas. The Kelo decision is studied as a continuation of the expansion of governments' power to seize property through eminent domain, although the widespread negative popular reaction has spurred a backlash in which many state legislatures have curtailed their eminent domain power.
- State v. Bell, 283 Conn. 748, 931 A.2d 198 (2007). Among her more publicized opinions was in State v. Bell, where "the high court unanimously upheld the conviction of Arnold Bell, who had shot a New Haven police officer, but found part of a law giving him a stiffer sentence as a persistent dangerous offender unconstitutional. The court ruled that a jury, not a judge, must make that determination." This decision led prominent legislators to conclude it had effectively voided the state's persistent violent offender law, and a new law would need to be implemented.
- Kerrigan v. Commissioner of Public Health, 289 Conn. 135, 957 A.2d 407 (2008). On October 10, 2008, the Connecticut Supreme Court ruled in Kerrigan v. Commissioner of Public Health that gay and lesbian couples could not be denied the right to marry because of the Equal Protection Clause of the state constitution. This decision made Connecticut the third state (along with Massachusetts and California) to legalize same-sex marriage through judicial decree of the state supreme court. The majority opinion was written by Justice Richard N. Palmer, and joined by Justices Flemming L. Norcott Jr., Katz, and Judge Lubbie Harper Jr. Justices Peter T. Zarella, Christine S. Vertefeuille, and David Borden dissented.
- Rosado v. Bridgeport Roman Catholic Diocesan Corp., 292 Conn. 1 (2009). Katz authored the majority opinion in this case, which effectively ordered the Roman Catholic Diocese of Bridgeport to release thousands of legal documents from previous lawsuits filed against priests accused of sexually abusing children. The Connecticut Supreme Court case stemmed from a suit brought by the Boston Globe, Hartford Courant, New York Times, and Washington Post in 2002. In October 2009, the United States Supreme Court rejected requests by the Diocese to stay or reconsider the Connecticut opinion ordering the release of the documents. The documents were released at the Waterbury Superior Courthouse on December 1, 2009. The Diocese provided background and a statement on the suit and its status.

== CT Department of Children and Families ==
On November 30, 2010, incoming Gov. Dannel Malloy named Justice Katz to head the troubled Connecticut Department of Children and Families (DCF). She stepped down from the Connecticut Supreme Court on January 5, 2011, in anticipation of assuming the DCF post. Justice Katz said she looked forward to the challenge of leading DCF, noting, "I can think of few things more important than the mission of this agency."

Joette Katz was confirmed as Commissioner of DCF by unanimous vote of the Connecticut State Senate on February 4, 2011.

Connecticut made considerable progress in reforming the state child welfare system under the leadership of Commissioner Katz. In 2015, the Annie E. Casey Foundation, one of the leading organizations in child welfare issues in the U.S., published a case study that described changes at Connecticut's DCF as the "Connecticut Turnaround". The report stated, "Over five years, Connecticut has made substantial progress in turning around its troubled child welfare agency. ... the state has instituted improvements, driven down the number of unnecessary child removals and ensured that children entering state custody live in families whenever possible, not in group placements."

A report titled "The Malloy-Wyman Record: A Review Across Five Areas of Policy, January 5, 2011 – January 9, 2019", released by Governor Malloy and Lieutenant Governor Nancy Wyman at the end of their terms, summarized some of the progress made at DCF under Commissioner Katz's leadership:

- Achieved an almost 10 percent reduction in the total number of children in care.
- Oversaw a 76 percent decline in the number of children living in group settings.
- Doubled the number of youth living with a relative or other person the child knows well.
- Decreased out-of-state placements from 357 children in 2011 to just 7 children in 2018.
- Put the state on an achievable path to end decades of federal court oversight, affirming the remarkable transformation of the system.

On Dec. 6, 2018, Richard Wexler, executive director of the National Coalition for Child Protection Reform , wrote an op-ed in the Hartford Courant titled, "Connecticut losing the gutsiest leader in child welfare." He called her job as commissioner, "probably the hardest in state or local government."

In a year-end editorial, "Hearts and Darts: Connecticut's Highs and Lows, for 2018," the Hartford Courant awarded Katz a Heart, saying, "... we believe her policy of trying to keep struggling families intact did a lot of good."

Commissioner Katz retired from DCF in January 2019.

== Shipman & Goodwin ==
On Jan. 14, 2018, Katz joined the law firm Shipman & Goodwin LLP as a partner in its Business Litigation Practice Group. She works in several areas, including with the firm's practitioners who handle federal, state and administrative appeals. In addition, she provides mediation services, and assists the firm's clients both when facing government investigations, and in the conduct of their own internal investigations. The firm's business litigation practice group comprises nearly 70 attorneys representing clients in state and federal courts throughout the U.S. across a range of subject areas. She works in the firm's Stamford and Hartford, Connecticut offices.

== Other Activities ==
Justice Katz has served on numerous committees and commissions, including the American Law Institute Model Penal Code: Sentencing project , the Connecticut chapter of the American Inns of Court, the Connecticut Advisory Committee on Appellate Rules (which she chaired), the Connecticut Code of Evidence Oversight Committee (which she chaired), the Connecticut Criminal Practice Commission , the Connecticut Law Revision Commission , the Connecticut Public Defender Services Commission , and the Connecticut Client Security Fund (which she chaired).

She is co-author of the book, Connecticut Criminal Caselaw Handbook: A Practitioner's Guide, published in 1989 by the Connecticut Law Tribune.

Justice Katz has been an instructor at the Yale Law School in New Haven, where she is currently serving as Visiting Clinical Lecturer , teaching Ethics in Litigation and Children and the Law. She also has been an instructor of criminal law and ethics at the Quinnipiac University School of Law in Hamden and also served from 1981 to 1984 as an instructor in legal research and writing, Moot Court, and appellate advocacy at the University of Connecticut School of Law.

She is a Trustee at the University of Saint Joseph in West Hartford, Connecticut .

She is the Chair of the Editorial Board of the Connecticut Law Tribune.

Justice Katz is a frequent expert panelist for the Anti-Defamation League, speaking on Leveraging the Law to Combat Antisemitism and Bias. "We know we can’t convict them for it, but we can drag them through hell."

== Awards and honors ==
Justice Katz has received many awards and honors, including:

- The National Organization for Women's Harriet Tubman Award in 1993
- The Connecticut Women's Education and Legal Fund's Maria Stewart Award in 1993
- Commencement speaker at the University of Connecticut School of Law, 1997
- The University of Connecticut School of Law's Distinguished Graduate Award in 2000
- The National Council of Jewish Women's Women of Distinction Award in 2001
- The Connecticut Bar Association's Henry J. Naruk Judiciary Award in 2004
- An Honorary Degree of Doctor of Laws from Quinnipiac University School of Law, 2004
- Connecticut Trial Lawyers Association Women's Caucus: Trailblazer Award, 2006
- The University of Connecticut School of Law's Law Review Award in 2009
- Associate Fellow of Trumbull College at Yale University, 2009
- Connecticut Women's Hall of Fame: Notable Women of Influence, 2011
- Governing magazine: A Public Official of the Year, 2012
- Commencement speaker at the University of Connecticut, 2012
- Community Mediation: The 2012 Honorable Robert C. Zampano Award for Excellence in Mediation, 2012
- The Lawyers Children for America: Outstanding Leadership Award, 2013
- Connecticut Voices for Children: State Policy Leadership Award, 2013
- Casey Family Programs: Casey Excellence for Children Award, 2015
- Family Children's Agency: Family Strengthening Award, 2015
- Hartford County Bar Association John M. Bailey Memorial Award for Public Service, 2019
- Distinguished Leader Award, Connecticut Law Tribune, 2020

== See also ==
- List of Jewish American jurists
