= Lubbie Harper Jr. =

American judge (born 1942)

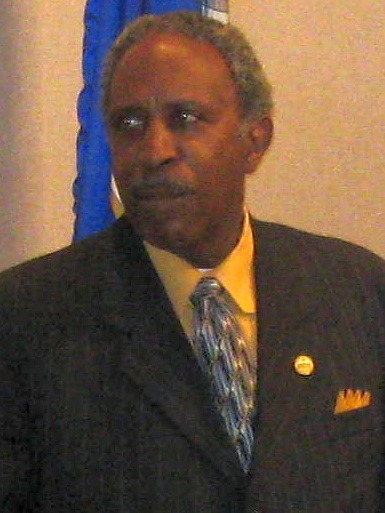
- Harper in 2011

Justice of the Connecticut Supreme Court
- In office March 16, 2011 – November 2012
- Appointed by: Dannel Malloy
- Preceded by: Joette Katz
- Succeeded by: Andrew J. McDonald

Personal details
- Born: 1942 (age 83–84) New Haven, Connecticut, US
- Party: Democratic
- Education: University of New Haven (BS); University of Connecticut (MSW, JD)
- Occupation: Lawyer, judge

Lubbie Harper Jr. (born 1942) is an American lawyer and judge who was the third African American to become a justice of the Connecticut Supreme Court, serving from 2011 through 2012. While seconded to the court in 2008, he cast the deciding vote in Kerrigan v. Commissioner of Public Health, a ruling that legalized same-sex marriage in Connecticut. Harper also served as a justice on the Connecticut Superior Court (1997–2005) and on the Connecticut Appellate Court (2005–2011).

== Early life and career ==
Born in 1942 in New Haven, Connecticut, to parents who had moved northwards from North Carolina, Harper was raised by his mother and grandmother and grew up in the Newhallville and Dixwell inner-city neighborhoods. He attended local public schools and became a star basketball player at Wilbur L. Cross High School, graduating in 1961.

Harper was the first in his family to attend college. He earned a Bachelor of Science degree from the University of New Haven in 1965 and a Master of Social Work degree from the University of Connecticut in 1967. For nearly a decade, he worked as a community school coordinator at the New Haven Community Schools and as a field instructor for the UConn School of Social Work. He returned to UConn to study law, receiving a J.D. from the University of Connecticut School of Law in 1975.

Following admission to the Connecticut bar in 1976, Harper spent more than twenty years in private practice. He represented New Haven's board of education in matters concerning labor relations and education law and served as a campaign chair for John DeStefano Jr. in the 1990s.

== Judicial career ==
Harper received judicial appointments from two Republican and one Democratic governors. On May 22, 1997, Governor John G. Rowland nominated Harper to the Connecticut Superior Court, and he took the oath office on July 7, 1997. On January 5, 2005, Governor Jodi Rell nominated Harper to the Connecticut Appellate Court. He took the oath of office on January 26, 2005. Harper wrote 224 appellate opinions during the ensuing years. While standing in for recused Chief Justice Chase T. Rogers on the Connecticut Supreme Court in 2008, Harper cast the deciding vote in the case of Kerrigan v. Commissioner of Public Health. In this 4–3 ruling, the State Supreme Court legalized same-sex marriage in Connecticut.

On February 23, 2011, Governor Dannel Malloy nominated Harper to the Connecticut Supreme Court, even though Harper would reach the court's mandatory retirement age of 70 in November 2012. On March 16, 2011, Connecticut House of Representatives approved the nomination on a vote of 124–16, and the Connecticut State Senate followed suit, 24–7. Harper was sworn in the same day. Harper succeeded Joette Katz on the court. Harper was the third African American to serve on the state supreme court, following Robert D. Glass and Flemming L. Norcott Jr.

Following his retirement from the courts, Harper sits by designation on the Appellate Court. He chairs the State Commission on Racial and Ethnic Disparity in the Criminal Justice System and serves as Connecticut's representative to the National Consortium on Racial and Ethnic Fairness in the Courts. He mentored scores of students, lawyers, and fellow judges throughout his life.

== Community service ==
Active in his profession and the community throughout his judicial career, Harper served twelve years as president of the New Haven Legal Assistance Association’s Board of Directors. He served as a clinical tutor at Yale Law School and on the advisory board for the legal studies program at the University of New Haven. He also sat on the university's board of governors. He served as a board member of many civic and professional organizations, including the Connecticut Judges Association, the UConn School of Law Alumni Association, the Shirley Frank Foundation, the Children's Museum of Greater New Haven, the Ulysses S. Grant Foundation, the Dixwell Legal Rights Association, the Urban League, and the New Haven Civil Service Commission.

== Awards and honors ==
He received honorary Doctor of Laws degrees from the Quinnipiac University School of Law in 2012 and the University of New Haven in 2013. The Library Media Center at Wilbur L. Cross High School was named after him in 2013. The University of New Haven established the Justice Lubbie Harper, Jr. Endowed Scholarship Fund in 2017.

Harper received the following awards and honors, among others:

- UConn School of Law Alumni Association's Public Service Award in 2022
- New Haven County Bar Association's Lifetime Achievement Award in 2019
- Greater New Haven NAACP's Legend Award in 2019
- New Haven Register's Person of the Year in 2018
- Connecticut Bar Association's John Eldred Shields Distinguished Professional Service Award in 2016
- George W. Crawford Black Bar Association's Trailblazer Award in 2015
- Eastern Connecticut State University's Community Recipient of the Dr. Martin Luther King, Jr. Distinguished Service Award in 2013
- Lawyers Collaborative for Diversity’s Edwin Archer Randolph Diversity Award in 2011
- Connecticut State Conference of NAACP Branches' 100 Most Influential Blacks in Connecticut List in 2009
- New Haven Public School Foundation's Annual Alumni Legacy Award in 2008
- Greater New Haven Branch of the NAACP's Rev. Dr. Martin Luther King Leadership Award in 2006
- University of New Haven Alumni Association's Distinguished Alumni Award in 2003

== Personal life ==
Harper and his wife, Twila, live in North Haven.

== See also ==
- List of African-American jurists

Political offices
Preceded by Joette Katz	Justice of the Connecticut Supreme Court; 2011–2012	Succeeded by Andrew J. McDonald
