= Christine S. Vertefeuille =

American judge (born 1950)

Christine Vertefeuille

Senior Justice of the Connecticut Supreme Court
- Incumbent
- Assumed office June 1, 2010

Associate Justice of the Connecticut Supreme Court
- In office January 3, 2000 – June 1, 2010
- Appointed by: John G. Rowland
- Preceded by: Robert I. Berdon
- Succeeded by: Dennis G. Eveleigh

Personal details
- Born: December 10, 1950 (age 75) New Britain, Connecticut, U.S.
- Education: Trinity College (BA); University of Connecticut (JD)

Christine Siegrist Vertefeuille (born December 10, 1950) is a Senior Justice of the Connecticut Supreme Court.

== Life ==
She is a Connecticut native, born in New Britain, Connecticut. She graduated from Trinity College with a Bachelor of Arts in Political Science in 1972 and the University of Connecticut School of Law with a Juris Doctor in 1975.

Vertefeuille began her career as a judge with her 1989 appointment to the Connecticut Superior Court. During her tenure as a Superior Court Judge, she presided over the Connecticut silicone gel breast implant cases (1993–99). In addition, Vertefeuille served as the Administrative Judge in the Waterbury Judicial District (1994–99) and as a Complex Litigation Judge (1999).

Vertefeuille was appointed a Judge of the Connecticut Appellate Court on September 13, 1999. On January 3, 2000, Vertefeuille was appointed a justice of the Connecticut Supreme Court, succeeding Justice Robert I. Berdon, who retired by law. She served as the Administrative Judge of the Appellate System from June 1, 2000, to July 31, 2006. In 2010, Vertefeuille announced her decision to retire and assume Senior Status. Governor M. Jodi Rell appointed Superior Court Judge Dennis Eveleigh to succeed her.

On October 10, 2008, the Connecticut Supreme Court ruled in Kerrigan v. Commissioner of Public Health that gay and lesbian couples could not be denied the right to marry because of the Equal Protection Clause of the state constitution. This decision made Connecticut the third state (along with Massachusetts and California) to legalize same-sex marriage through judicial decree of the state supreme court. The majority opinion was written by Justice Richard N. Palmer, and joined by Justices Flemming L. Norcott Jr., Joette Katz, and Judge Lubbie Harper Jr. Justices Peter T. Zarella, Vertefeuille, and David Borden dissented.
