= Protection of Homes, Small Businesses, and Private Property Act of 2005 =

The Protection of Homes, Small Businesses, and Private Property Act of 2005 (S. 1313) is a United States bill "[t]o protect homes, small businesses, and other private property rights, by limiting the power of eminent domain." The bill was introduced on June 27, 2005, to the first session of the 109th Congress.

This bill was introduced to counter the controversial Supreme Court decision in the case of Kelo v. New London, which expanded the power of states to use eminent domain to confiscate homes, businesses, and private property for "economic development", rather than just "public use".

This bill was sponsored by Senator John Cornyn, Republican from Texas.

== Status ==
- On June 27, 2005, this bill was referred to the Senate Committee on the Judiciary.

== Complaints about this bill ==
Some claim that, although this bill may have the right idea, it lacks the means to enforce itself. One organization, DownsizeDC.org, Inc., has proposed an amendment to this bill, one which it says would give this bill "teeth", as it calls it, or in other words, a means of enforcement.
