= Little Pink House =

- Theatrical release poster
- Directed by: Courtney Balaker
- Written by: Courtney Balaker
- Produced by: Courtney Balaker; Ted Balaker; Arielle Boisvert; Joel Soisson; Jeff Benedict
- Starring: Catherine Keener; Jeanne Tripplehorn
- Cinematography: Alex Lehmann
- Edited by: Soojin Chung
- Music by: Scott McRae; Ryan Rapsys
- Production company: Korchula Productions
- Distributed by: Dada Films
- Release dates: February 3, 2017 (Santa Barbara); April 20, 2018 (United States)
- Running time: 98 minutes
- Countries: United States; Canada
- Language: English

Little Pink House is a 2017 American biographical drama film written and directed by Courtney Balaker in her feature directorial debut, based on the book Little Pink House: A True Story of Defiance and Courage by Jeff Benedict, which chronicled the case of Kelo v. City of New London. Starring Catherine Keener and Jeanne Tripplehorn, the film follows Susette Kelo (Keener), a paramedic from New London, Connecticut, who sues the town for attempting to transfer ownership of her property to a corporation through eminent domain.

Although the film is set in New London, Connecticut, Principal photography began in Vancouver on September 14, 2015, and concluded on October 15.

Little Pink House premiered at the Santa Barbara International Film Festival on February 3, 2017, where Balaker won the Panavision Spirit Award for Independent Cinema. The film was theatrically released in the United States on April 20, 2018, to positive reviews from critics.

== Plot ==
A small-town paramedic named Susette Kelo emerges as the reluctant leader of her working-class neighbors in their struggle to save their homes from political and corporate interests bent on seizing the land and handing it over to Pfizer Corporation. Ambitious academic Dr. Charlotte Wells, president of the fictional "Walthrop College" (in real life, Connecticut College President Claire Gaudiani) persuades the current governor (John G. Rowland, unnamed in the movie) that this could help his public image by increasing tax revenue for the poor. Susette's battle goes all the way to the U.S. Supreme Court and the controversial 5–4 decision in Kelo vs. City of New London gave government officials the power to bulldoze a neighborhood for the benefit of a multibillion-dollar corporation. The decision outraged Americans across the political spectrum, and that passion fueled reforms that helped curb eminent domain abuse.

== Cast ==
- Catherine Keener as Susette Kelo
- Jeanne Tripplehorn as Charlotte Wells
- Aaron Douglas as Governor
- Callum Keith Rennie as Tim Leblanc
- Colin Cunningham as Billy Von Winkle
- Giacomo Baessato as Scott Bullock
- Michael Kopsa as Howard Munson

== Reception ==
On review aggregator website Rotten Tomatoes, the film holds an approval rating of 76%, based on 29 reviews, and an average rating of 6.19/10. The website's critics consensus reads: "Little Pink House rises up on the foundation of Catherine Keener's strong central performance..." On Metacritic, the film has a weighted average score of 55 out of 100, based on 13 critics, indicating "mixed or average" reviews.

A bipartisan congressional screening of the film was held at the U.S. Capitol.

== Accolades ==
- Winner, HBO Audience Choice Award, Provincetown International Film Festival
- Winner, Audience Choice Award, Vail Film Festival
- Winner, Jimmy Stewart Legacy Award, Heartland Film Festival
- Winner, Best Feature, Rainier Independent Film Festival
- Winner, Grand Prize, Anthem Film Festival
- Winner, Best Narrative, Anthem Film Festival
- Winner, Best Original Score, Anthem Film Festival
- Winner, Best Casting, Leo Awards
- Finalist, Athena List
- Winner, The Faith and Freedom Award for Movies, Movieguide Awards
- Nominee, Best Picture, Leo Awards
- Nominee, Best Production Design, Leo Awards
- Nominee, Best Costume Design, Leo Awards
