= Chase T. Rogers =

American judge (born 1956)

Chase Rogers

Chief Justice of the Connecticut Supreme Court
- In office April 25, 2007 – February 5, 2018
- Appointed by: Jodi Rell
- Preceded by: William J. Sullivan
- Succeeded by: Richard A. Robinson

Personal details
- Born: Chase Theodora Rogers; November 12, 1956 (age 69) New York City, New York, U.S.
- Education: Stanford University (BA); Boston University (JD)

Chase T. Rogers (born November 12, 1956) was the Chief Justice of the Connecticut Supreme Court, the second woman to serve in this capacity. She announced on November 2, 2017, that she would retire in February 2018. She is a graduate of Stanford University and Boston University School of Law. Rogers is a Connecticut native. She was nominated by Governor M. Jodi Rell and sworn on April 25, 2007, by the first female Chief Justice of the Connecticut Supreme Court, Ellen Ash Peters. Prior to her nomination, Rogers served in the appellate court of Connecticut from April 2006 to April 2007. Prior to serving on the appellate court, she served as a superior court judge beginning in 1998. Her assignments included serving as the presiding judge for juvenile matters in Bridgeport and being assigned to the regional Child Protection Session in Middletown. Between 2001 and 2005, she was assigned to the Complex Litigation Docket in Stamford, and from 2005 to 2006 she served as the presiding judge for civil matters in the Stamford-Norwalk district. Before becoming a judge, she practiced law for 14 years at Cummings & Lockwood in Stamford, Connecticut. She has two children, a son and a daughter. She was married to Edward Vincent O'Hanlan, a lawyer, on December 21, 1985.

At their 2011 fall commencement ceremony, she was awarded an honorary Doctor of Laws degree from the University of Hartford.

== See also ==
- Biographies of Supreme Court Justices at the Connecticut Supreme Court.

Legal offices
Preceded by William J. Sullivan	Chief Justice of the Connecticut Supreme Court; 2007–2018	Succeeded by Richard N. Palmer; Acting
