= Claire Gaudiani =

American academic administrator (1944–2024)

Claire Lynn Gaudiani (November 10, 1944 – October 16, 2024) was an American academic and president of Connecticut College from 1988 to 2001. She graduated from Connecticut College in 1966. During her tenure as president, the college's endowment grew significantly, and its national profile rose. Gaudiani was also known for her controversial role in the redevelopment of New London, Connecticut, which led to the landmark Supreme Court case Kelo v. City of New London, a role portrayed by Jeanne Tripplehorn in the 2017 biographical drama film Little Pink House. She died of leukemia on October 16, 2024, at the age of 79.
