= Steven D. Ecker =

American judge (born 1961)

Steven Ecker
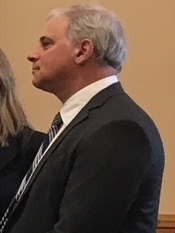

Associate Justice of the Connecticut Supreme Court
- Incumbent
- Assumed office May 3, 2018
- Appointed by: Dannel Malloy
- Preceded by: Richard A. Robinson

Personal details
- Born: April 19, 1961 (age 65) Chicago, Illinois, U.S.
- Education: Yale University (BA); Harvard University (JD)

Steven D. Ecker (born April 19, 1961) is an American lawyer and judge who has served as an associate justice of the Connecticut Supreme Court since 2018.

== Education ==
Ecker received his Bachelor of Arts degree from Yale University, magna cum laude, in 1984, and his Juris Doctor from Harvard Law School, magna cum laude, in 1987. While in law school, Ecker was an editor of the Harvard Law Review from 1985 to 1987, and a member of the winning team in the Ames Moot Court Competition in 1987.

== Judicial career ==
=== Connecticut superior court service ===
He was nominated to a seat on the superior court on March 14, 2014 and confirmed on April 29, 2014.

=== Connecticut Supreme Court service ===
On April 5, 2018, Governor Dannel Malloy nominated Ecker to the Connecticut Supreme Court to fill the vacancy of Richard A. Robinson, who was nominated and confirmed as the chief justice.

Legal offices
Preceded by Richard A. Robinson	Associate Justice of the Connecticut Supreme Court; 2018–present	Incumbent
