= Sheff v. O'Neill =

Sheff v. O'Neill refers to a 1989 lawsuit and the subsequent 1996 Connecticut Supreme Court case (Sheff v. O'Neill, 238 Conn. 1, 678 A.2d 1267) that resulted in a landmark decision regarding civil rights and the right to education. A judge finally approved a settlement of the matter January 10, 2020.

== Timeline ==
On April 27, 1989, eighteen school aged children from the metropolitan Hartford, Connecticut area, acting through their parents, commenced a civil action in the Hartford Superior Court. The lead plaintiff was fourth-grader Milo Sheff. The suit named the State of Connecticut, constitutionally elected officials, including Gov. William A. O'Neill, and others from various state commissions and agencies as defendants. The plaintiffs alleged significant constitutional violations under applicable sections of the State constitution which they believe constituted a denial of their fundamental rights to an education and rights to equal protection under the law. The reason for the case was that the resources the state spent on schools in areas with majority black/Latino populations were lower than those spent on schools in areas mainly inhabited by white people.

In 1995, Judge Harry Hammer ruled in favor of the State in the case. His decision rejected claims that officials are obligated to correct educational inequities, no matter how they came to be. Further, he ruled that without proof that government action helped foster racial isolation, courts cannot require steps that would change the composition of the city and suburban school enrollments.

This decision was appealed to the Connecticut Supreme Court. On July 9, 1996, the court overturned Hammer's ruling, in a split 4-3 decision authored by Chief Justice Ellen Ash Peters (Sheff v. O'Neill, 678 A.2d 1267 (1996), 678 A.2d 1267). Peters was joined in the majority opinion by Justices Robert Berdon, Flemming L. Norcott, Jr., and Joette Katz. Justice David Borden authored the dissent, with Justices Robert Callahan and Richard Palmer concurring with the dissent. The court ruled that the state had an affirmative obligation to provide Connecticut's school children with a substantially equal educational opportunity and that this constitutionally guaranteed right encompasses the access to a public education which is not substantially and materially impaired by racial and ethnic isolation. The Court further concluded that school districting, based upon town and city boundary lines, is unconstitutional, and cited a statute that bounds school districts by town lines as a key factor in the high concentrations of racial and ethnic minorities in Hartford.

As a result of the Connecticut Supreme Court decision, in 1997 the Connecticut State Legislature passed legislation titled "An Act Enhancing Educational Choices and Opportunities", which encourages voluntary actions toward racial integration. The act also included a number of other measures related to magnet and regional charter schools and included a requirement for the Connecticut State Department of Education to come up with a five-year plan to assess and eliminate inequalities between school districts.

In 1998, the Sheff plaintiffs filed a motion for a court order to require the state to adhere to the Supreme Court ruling. On March 3, 1999, Superior Court Judge Julia L. Aurigemma ruled that the state of Connecticut had complied with the decision of the Connecticut Supreme Court.

In 2002, Judge Aurigemma held a hearing on the progress of the case and negotiations began on a settlement which was approved in 2003. It included a goal of having 30 percent of Hartford minority students in reduced-isolation school settings by 2007.

In 2007, the 2003 settlement expired short of its goal. An independent Trinity College report found that only 9 percent of Hartford's minority students attended less racially isolated schools. The plaintiffs brought the issue back to court in 2007 and the two sides began talks on a second settlement.

In June 2008, a second settlement was negotiated, calling for building more magnet schools in the Hartford suburbs and expanding the number of openings for Hartford children in suburban public schools. The new settlement also included state-run technical and agricultural high schools.

In Dec 2008, the state and the plaintiffs issued a 50-page document that outlined exactly how the new goals would be met. The plan called for a mix of existing programs, creating new magnet and charter schools, increasing support for the programs and collecting data on progress.
