= Peter T. Zarella =

American judge (born 1949)

- In office January 22, 2001 – December 31, 2016

Personal details
- Born: October 13, 1949 (age 76) Boston, Massachusetts, U.S.
- Education: Northeastern University (BS); Suffolk University Law School (JD)
- Profession: Lawyer, judge

Peter T. Zarella (born October 13, 1949) is a former Associate Justice of the Connecticut Supreme Court. Zarella sat on the court from when he was appointed by Governor John G. Rowland in January 2001 until his retirement on December 31, 2016.

== Early life, education, and career ==
Zarella is a native of Boston. He received his B.S. from Northeastern University in 1972 and his J.D. from Suffolk University Law School in 1975.

Zarella was in private practice from 1977 to 1996, and was a partner in the Hartford firm of Brown, Paindiris & Zarella from 1978 until 1996, when he was appointed to the Connecticut Superior Court. In December 1999, Zarella was elevated to the Connecticut Appellate Court.

Governor John G. Rowland nominated Zarella as an associate justice of the Connecticut Supreme Court on January 4, 2001, and was sworn in on January 22, 2001.

== Supreme Court ==
In 2004, Zarella authored the dissenting opinion (joined by then-Chief Justice William J. Sullivan and Associate Justice Joette Katz) in the important Kelo v. City of New London case. The case was decided by the Connecticut Supreme Court in a 4-3 en banc decision, with the majority opinion authored by Justice Flemming L. Norcott, Jr., joined by Justices David M. Borden, Richard N. Palmer and Christine S. Vertefeuille. The Supreme Court of the United States affirmed the Connecticut Supreme Court's decision in favor of the city in a 5–4 decision, in what is viewed as a major decision in the history of the eminent domain power. A widespread negative reaction to the opinion led to many state legislatures restricting their eminent domain power.

On March 24, 2006, Zarella was nominated by Governor M. Jodi Rell to replace Chief Justice William J. Sullivan, who had announced his retirement scheduled for April 15, 2005. The Connecticut Supreme Court became embroiled in a lengthy ethics scandal, however, when the Hartford Courant revealed that Sullivan had postponed the publication of a controversial decision opposing Freedom of Information Act requests for documents that track the status and history of legal cases in the Connecticut legal system until hearings for Zarella were completed. Both justices ruled in favor of the restrictions, and legislators speculated that Sullivan delayed the publication of the court's opinion because he feared it might damage Zarella's chances of becoming chief justice. This was subsequently confirmed in testimony by Sullivan. In April 2006 Rell withdrew Zarella's nomination to be Chief Justice at his request after these revelations. There is no evidence that Zarella had knowledge that Sullivan was intentionally delaying publication of an opinion for the benefit of his nomination.

On October 10, 2008, Zarella dissented in the case of Kerrigan v. Commissioner of Public Health, in which the court held that gay and lesbian couples could not be denied the right to marry because of the Equal Protection Clause of the state constitution. This decision made Connecticut the third state (along with Massachusetts and California) to legalize same-sex marriage through judicial decree of the state supreme court.

Zarella is a former chair of the Connecticut Criminal Justice Commission and the Rules Committee.
