= City of Norwood v. Horney =

2006 Ohio Supreme Court case

- Court: Supreme Court of Ohio
- Full case name: City of Norwood v. Horney, et al. City of Norwood v. Gamble, et al.
- Decided: July 26, 2006
- Citations: 110 Ohio St.3d 353; 2006-Ohio-3799

Case history
- Appealed from: City of Norwood v. Horney, 2005-Ohio-2448, 161 Ohio App. 3d 316, 830 N.E.2d 381

Court membership
- Judges sitting: Thomas J. Moyer, Maureen O'Connor, Paul E. Pfeifer, Evelyn Lundberg Stratton, Terrence O'Donnell, Judith Ann Lanzinger, James A. Brogan

Case opinions
- Decision by: O'Connor

City of Norwood v. Horney, 110 Ohio St.3d 353 (2006), was a case brought before the Ohio Supreme Court in 2006. The case came upon the heels of Kelo v. City of New London, in which the United States Supreme Court ruled that commercial development justified the use of eminent domain. Kelo had involved the United States Constitution, while the issue in Norwood was the specific limitations of the Ohio State Constitution.

In the Norwood case, the city wished to seize about seventy homes and businesses to make way for private development, including retail, offices, and condominiums. Homeowners Joe Horney, Carl and Joy Gamble, and Matthew and Sanae Burton, filed three separate cases to stop the seizure of their homes. Following appeals, these cases were combined into the Supreme Court case Norwood v. Horney. As in the Kelo case, the Institute for Justice represented the Norwood homeowners.

In July 2006, the court found unanimously for the homeowners. Justice Maureen O'Connor (later Chief Justice) wrote the majority opinion, which ruled that economic benefit alone was insufficient to satisfy the eminent domain statute of the Ohio Constitution; that an Ohio statute allowing for the use of eminent domain seizures in the case of "deteriorating areas" was void for vagueness; and that the rest of this statute should remain in force. It also specified for the Ohio courts a standard for reviewing statutes that regulate eminent domain powers.

== Original cases ==
These cases were originally tried in the Hamilton County Court of Common Pleas. Information about these cases is available from the Hamilton County Clerk of Courts by searching for the Case Numbers listed.

- CITY OF NORWOOD vs. JOSEPH P HORNEY (A 0308648)
- CARL GAMBLE vs. CITY OF NORWOOD (A 0307160)
- CITY OF NORWOOD vs. MATTHEW F BURTON (A 0308646)

These were then appealed to the Court of Appeals, First Appellate District of Ohio, Hamilton County, Ohio.

- Gamble v. Norwood, 2004-Ohio-4661 (C-040019) (Note: Horney is listed as an additional plaintiff here.)
- Norwood v. Burton, 164 Ohio App.3d 136, 2005-Ohio-5720 (C-050065, C-050070)

Note: there are many other first-instance and appeals cases that were combined together into this Supreme Court case; these are just the most notable ones.
