= Connecticut Raised Bill 1098 =

Raised Bill S.B. 1098, Session Year 2009, entitled "An Act Modifying Corporate Laws Relating to Certain Religious Corporations", was a bill in the Connecticut General Assembly that would have applied solely to Roman Catholic parishes as civil corporations incorporated under the law of Connecticut. The bill, introduced in March 2009, was sponsored by Democratic state senators Mike Lawlor and Andrew J. McDonald. Its stated purpose was to "revise the corporate governance provisions applicable to the Roman Catholic Church and provide for the investigation of the misappropriation of funds by religious corporations."

On March 10, 2009, the bill was tabled.

== History ==
Senator McDonald and Representative Lawlor stated that the bill was proposed as a response to the 2006 fraud case in which Rev. Michael Jude Fay, a priest from the Diocese of Bridgeport, was accused of stealing $1.4 million from his parish. Raised Bill 1098 explicitly referred only to the Roman Catholic Church, and would require the creation of administrative corporate boards of lay people as heads of parishes, replacing the Church's normal oversight by priests and bishops. On March 11, 2009, a scheduled protest by 3500 marchers became a celebration following the news that the bill had been tabled.

== Controversy ==
According to the United States Conference of Catholic Bishops (USCCB), the bill "would force the Church to alter its structure in violation of its own religious principles." One of the sponsors of the Bill, Andrew J. McDonald, stated that the effort was an "attempt to create a forum for a group of concerned Catholic constituents to discuss their legislative proposals regarding parish corporate finances." Bishop William E. Lori, at that time Bishop of Bridgeport, described it as "unconstitutional," as a violation of the First Amendment to the United States Constitution. Connecticut Attorney General Richard Blumenthal opened an investigation to "determine its intent and its possible violation of the constitution."
