= Horton v. Meskill =

The Connecticut Supreme Court issued its ruling in Horton v. Meskill on April 19, 1977 (172 Conn. 615 (1977)). It held that the right to education in Connecticut is so basic and fundamental that any intrusion on the right must be strictly scrutinized. The Court said that public school students are entitled to equal enjoyment of the right to education, and a system of school financing that relied on local property tax revenues without regard to disparities in town wealth and that lacked significant equalizing state support was unconstitutional. It could not pass the test of strict judicial scrutiny. The Court also held that the creation of a constitutional system for education financing is a job for the legislature and not the courts.

== Majority Opinion ==
Chief Justice House wrote the majority opinion, holding that the property tax and flat per pupil state grant system for public schools violated the Connecticut constitution. At the time the case was brought, approximately 70% of school funds came from local sources, 20% to 25% from the state (in the form of a flat per pupil grant), and 5% from the federal government. Funds raised by local governments for local public school education came primarily from the property tax. The Court found that a significant measure of each town's ability to finance local education was the dollar amount of taxable property per pupil in the town.

For the 1972–73 school year, the effective yield per pupil ranged anywhere from $20,000 to approximately $170,000 per student. Taxpayers in property-poor towns paid higher tax rates for education than taxpayers in property-rich towns. The higher tax rates generated smaller tax revenues, and property-poor towns could not afford to spend as much per pupil on education as property-rich towns where less tax effort generated more money. The Court found that this funding system ensured that more educational dollars were allotted to children who lived in property-rich towns than to children in property-poor towns. This enabled the property-rich towns to offer a wider range and higher quality of education programs than other towns. It also provided students in property-rich towns with more course offerings and library resources, expanded special education, better learning disability teachers and facilities, and many other opportunities.

The Court held that because many elements of a quality education require high per pupil operating costs, there was a direct relationship between per pupil school expenditures and the breadth and quality of educational programs. The trial court had found that of all the existing forms of distributing state funds in use throughout the country at the time of the trial, the flat grant had the least equalizing effect on local financial abilities. The Supreme Court cited with approval the trial court's finding that substantial progress could be made toward equalizing the financial abilities of local districts by redistributing the flat grant funds according to a different formula, without the need for additional state taxes.

Education as a fundamental right.

The Court held that the right to education in Connecticut is so basic and fundamental that any infringement of that right must be strictly scrutinized. It found that Connecticut's recognition of the right to education in its constitution made education a fundamental right. It said that the wealth discrimination found among school districts differed from a traditional equal protection case because the students in property-poor towns still received an education, but of a lower quality. In most equal protection cases, the complaining party has been absolutely denied a right, rather than the qualitative denial of the type at issue in Horton. The Court agreed with the trial court and the plaintiffs' assertion of "the sheer irrationality" of the state's system of financing education based on property values. The trial court cited a Yale Law Journal Note which said the system "would be similar and no less tenable should the state make educational expenditures dependent upon some other irrelevant factor, such as the number of telephone poles in the district" (81 Yale L.J. 1303, 1307).

The Court used the language of the trial court in finding that the evidence showed that the state's delegation of its duty to finance education to the towns without regard to their financial abilities resulted in students in the poorer towns receiving an education of substantially lower breadth and quality than that received by students in towns with greater financial capability. This was true even though there was no difference between the constitutional duty of the state to the children of property-poor towns, in this case Canton, and its duty to children in other towns. The Court therefore held that the statutory scheme to discharge the state's constitutional duty to educate its children, which depended primarily on a local property tax base without regard to the disparity in the towns' ability to finance an educational program and with no significant equalizing state support, was not "appropriate legislation" as required by Article Eighth of the state constitution. The Court determined that the legislation did not implement the constitutional requirement that the state provide a substantially equal educational opportunity to the youth in its free public schools.

As a judicial body, the Court noted, its duty was to interpret the law. It was not to fashion an appropriate constitutional response to the question of how to finance the state's public education system. It therefore left the duty of creating a new system to the General Assembly, as required by the state constitution. It remarked, however, that none of the basic alternative plans to equalize the ability of towns to finance education would require that all towns spend the same amount for the education of each student.

Justices Bogdanski, Longo, and Barber concurred in the decision, and Justice Bogdanski filed a concurring opinion.

== Dissent ==
Justice Loiselle dissented from the majority opinion, arguing that education is not a fundamental right in Connecticut and that Article Tenth of the constitution specifically authorized the legislature to delegate the responsibility of raising most of the funds for education to the towns. He did not find the unequal education expenditures to be so irrational as to be offensive to equal rights. He said the state's system of financing was not the product of purposeful discrimination, but was rooted in years of experience in this and other states. Justice Loiselle feared that no system other than total state financing would be acceptable in light of the majority's decision in Horton.
