= Robert I. Berdon =

American judge (1929–2019)

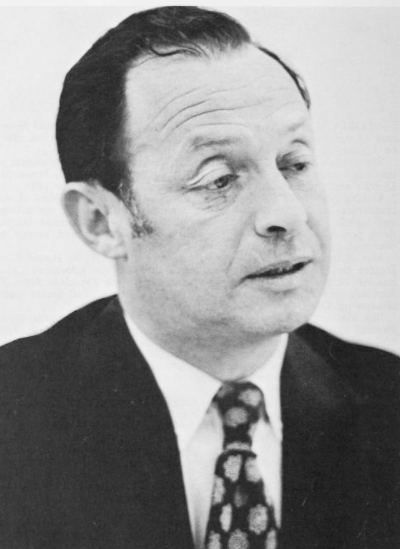

Associate Justice of the Connecticut Supreme Court
- In office September 4, 1991 – December 24, 1999
- Appointed by: Lowell P. Weicker Jr.
- Preceded by: T. Clark Hull
- Succeeded by: Christine S. Vertefeuille

Judge of the Connecticut Superior Court
- In office 1973–1991

74th Treasurer of Connecticut
- In office 1971 – June 28, 1973
- Governor: Thomas Meskill
- Preceded by: John A. Iorio
- Succeeded by: Alden A. Ives

Personal details
- Born: December 24, 1929
- Died: October 31, 2019 (aged 89)
- Party: Republican

Robert Irvin Berdon (December 24, 1929 – October 31, 2019) was a justice of the Connecticut Supreme Court from September 4, 1991 to 1999.

== Education and career ==
Berdon earned both his undergraduate and an LL.B. degree from the University of Connecticut, graduating from the University of Connecticut law school in 1957. Berdon worked for sixteen years in private practice before entering his political career.

In 1970, Berdon ran for and was elected Connecticut State Treasurer, defeating Bridgeport attorney John F. Merchant. He received national attention during his tenure, first in 1972 when refused to give up his office space at the Capitol, even when an eviction notice was served. Another significant feat during Berdon's tenure occurred when Connecticut won a seat on the PBW Stock Exchange in Philadelphia, "becoming the first public body to gain membership on a stock exchange."

In 1973, he was appointed to the Connecticut Superior Court, and after being passed over for the position by Governor William A. O'Neill following a controversial 1981 ruling requiring the state to pay for abortions for poor women, in 1991 he was elevated to the Connecticut Supreme Court by Governor Lowell Weicker. Berdon stepped down in 1999 after reaching the mandatory retirement age, but continued working as a state trial referee until 2014.

Berdon was married until the death of his wife in 1992. Berdon died in 2019.

Party political offices
| Preceded by James T. Patterson | Republican nominee for Connecticut State Treasurer; 1970 | Succeeded by John Zajac Jr. |
Political offices
| Preceded by T. Clark Hull | Justice of the Connecticut Supreme Court; 1991–1999 | Succeeded by Christine S. Vertefeuille |
