= Daniel R. Mandelker =

American legal scholar

Daniel R. Mandelker is the Howard A. Stamper Professor of Law at Washington University School of Law. His scholarship has been heavily cited in the fields of land use law, state and local government law, and environmental law.

== Educational Background ==
He received his B.A. in 1947 and his LL.B. in 1949 from the University of Wisconsin. He went on to receive his J.S.D. in 1956 from Yale University.

== Selected publications ==
- "Planning and Control of Land Development," (with J. Payne, P. Salsich & N. Stroud) (7th ed. 2007).
- "Land Use Law" (comprehensive treatise in this field).
- "Property Law and the Public Interest," (with G. Hylton, D. Callies & P. Franzese (3d ed. 2007) (modern property law casebook).
- "State and Local Government in a Federal System" (with D. Netsch, P. Salsich, J. Wegner, S. Stevenson & J. Griffith) (6th ed. 2006) (casebook on state and local government).
- "NEPA Law and Litigation" (2d ed. 1992 & Supp. 2007).

== See also ==
- Land Use
- Local government in the United States
