= Ellen Ash Peters =

American judge (1930–2024)

Ellen Peters

Chief Justice of the Connecticut Supreme Court
- In office 1984–1996
- Appointed by: William A. O'Neill

Associate Justice of the Connecticut Supreme Court
- In office 1978–2000
- Appointed by: Ella Tambussi Grasso

Personal details
- Born: Ellen Asch; March 21, 1930 Berlin, Brandenburg, Prussia, Germany
- Died: April 17, 2024 (aged 94) West Hartford, Connecticut, U.S.
- Party: Democratic
- Education: Swarthmore College (BA); Yale University (LLB)

Ellen Ash Peters (March 21, 1930 – April 17, 2024) was an American lawyer and judge. She was appointed to the Connecticut Supreme Court in 1978. She was the first woman appointed to that court.

== Early life and education ==
Ellen Ash was born in Berlin on March 21, 1930; her father was Jewish and a lawyer, and her grandfather was also a lawyer.

Her family fled the Nazis in 1938 and briefly lived in the Netherlands before immigrating to New York City in 1939. Peters attended Hunter College High School in New York, Swarthmore College, and Yale Law School, receiving her LL.B., cum laude, in 1954.

== Career ==
Peters clerked for Chief Judge Charles Edward Clark of the U.S. Court of Appeals for the Second Circuit for one year, and was a research associate at the University of California at Berkeley Law School (Boalt Hall) for another year.

Peters became assistant professor at Yale Law School in 1956 and full professor in 1964 before being named Southmayd Professor of Law, a post she held from 1975 to 1978, when Governor Ella Tambussi Grasso appointed Peters to the Connecticut Supreme Court. Peters was the first woman to gain tenure at Yale Law School. Peters was the first female state supreme court justice appointed by a female governor.

After Peters was appointed to the bench, she remained an adjunct professor until being appointed chief justice in 1984 by Governor William A. O'Neill. Peters remained chief justice until 1996, when she took senior status, leaving the court in 2000 when she reached mandatory retirement age.

After stepping down from the Supreme Court of Connecticut, Peters remained active on the bench, sitting from 2000 to 2014 as a judge trial referee on the Connecticut Appellate Court in Hartford.

Peters was a visiting professor of law at the University of Connecticut Law School.

=== Notable decisions ===
Sheff v. O'Neill refers to a 1989 lawsuit and the subsequent 1996 Connecticut Supreme Court case (Sheff v. O'Neill, 238 Conn. 1, 678 A.2d 1267) that resulted in a landmark decision regarding civil rights and the right to education. In 1996 the Connecticut Supreme Court ruled that the state had an affirmative obligation to provide Connecticut's school children with a substantially equal educational opportunity and that this constitutionally guaranteed right encompasses the access to a public education which is not substantially and materially impaired by racial and ethnic isolation. The Court further concluded that school districting based upon town and city boundary lines are unconstitutional, and cited a statute that bounds school districts by town lines as a key factor in the high concentrations of racial and ethnic minorities in Hartford. This was a split 4–3 decision, which was authored by Chief Justice Peters. She was joined in the majority opinion by Justices Robert Berdon, Flemming L. Norcott, Jr., and Joette Katz. Justice David Borden authored the dissent, with Justices Robert Callahan and Richard Palmer concurring with the dissent.

== Memberships, awards and honors ==
Peters was an alumni fellow of the Yale Corporation and a former member of the board of managers of Swarthmore College. She was a member of the Council of the American Law Institute, the American Philosophical Society, and the American Academy of Arts and Sciences.

Peters was the first recipient of the Ella T. Grasso Distinguished Service Medal, and received a number of other awards, including the Connecticut Trial Lawyers' Association Judiciary Award, the Yale Law School Distinguished Service Medal, the Hartford College for Women's Pioneer Woman Award, and the National Center for State Courts' Warren E. Burger Award (2002). She received an honorary Doctor of Laws from the University of Connecticut in 1992.

March 21, 2015, was declared "Ellen Ash Peters Day" in Connecticut by Governor Dannel P. Malloy of Connecticut.

== Personal life and death ==
Peters's first marriage was to Robert Peters, a psychiatrist. They had three children and subsequently divorced.

Peters then married Phillip I. Blumberg, the former dean of the University of Connecticut Law School. The couple lived in West Hartford.

In 2006 as executrix of Maria Ash, Peters sued Sotheby's Inc concerning a painting that had belonged to Maria Ash's husband Curt Glaser

Blumberg died in 2021. Peters died in West Hartford, Connecticut on April 17, 2024, at the age of 94.

== Sources ==
- Remarks by Justice Peters upon her retirement
- Peters receives award from National Center for State Courts

== See also ==
- List of female state supreme court justices
