= Robert D. Glass =

American judge (1922–2001)

Robert Davis Glass

Justice of the Connecticut Supreme Court
- In office June 26, 1987 – November 28, 1992
- Appointed by: Governor William A. O'Neill
- Preceded by: Joseph F. Dannehy
- Succeeded by: Richard N. Palmer

Personal details
- Born: November 28, 1922 Wetumpka, Alabama, US
- Died: November 27, 2001 (aged 78) Waterbury, Connecticut, US
- Party: Democratic Party
- Education: North Carolina Central University School of Law (JD); North Carolina Central University (BA)
- Occupation: Lawyer, judge

Robert Davis Glass (November 28, 1922 – November 27, 2001) was the first African American justice of the Connecticut Supreme Court, serving from 1987 to 1992. He was a plaintiff in McKissick v. Carmichael, which desegregated the University of North Carolina School of Law in 1951.

== Early life ==
Glass was born into poverty in the racially segregated Deep South, in Wetumpka, Alabama. His parents, Isaiah and M. E. (Jackson) Glass, were a farmhand and a domestic worker. His family was too poor to afford schoolbooks, so he only began attending school at the age of ten. His mother's employer, a judge, mentored Glass, inviting him to observe court proceedings and discussing cases with him while Glass worked as his caddie.

Shortly after high school, Glass enlisted in the US Army during World War II, serving from 1943 to 1946 and earning the Good Conduct Medal, World War II Victory Medal, and the Asiatic–Pacific Campaign Medal. He was discharged with the rank of sergeant.

== Education ==
A skilled athlete who stood 6 feet 7 inches tall, Glass attended North Carolina Central University (then an exclusively African American college) on a basketball scholarship. He earned his Bachelor of Arts degree magna cum laude in 1949. Rejected from the University of North Carolina School of Law due to his race, Glass attended the NCCU School of Law instead. He graduated at the top of his class in 1951, when he became the first African American admitted to the North Carolina bar. His parents mortgaged their home to give Glass the $500 he needed to open a law office.

== Civil rights action ==
With Harold T. Epps Sr., Glass filed a landmark 1949 civil rights action against the University of North Carolina School of Law, which had denied them admission because of their race. The trial court found that Glass was ineligible to remain a plaintiff as he was not a state resident, so the NAACP and lead attorney Thurgood Marshall brought in Floyd McKissick and other Black law school applicants to continue the case. The US Court of Appeals for the Fourth Circuit ruled in favor of the plaintiffs in McKissick v. Carmichael in March 1951, overturning a lower court ruling. The US Supreme Court declined to hear the case in June 1951. McKissick and four other African Americans were admitted to the UNC School of Law a week later.

== Judicial career ==
In 1962, Glass moved with his family to Waterbury, Connecticut, where he continued private practice, worked for the Connecticut Department of Labor, and briefly served as an assistant US attorney from 1966 to 1967. He was the first African American to serve as a federal prosecutor in Connecticut. Glass became president of the Connecticut State Federation of Black Democratic Clubs, where he befriended Gerald Lamb, a Waterbury resident and Connecticut's first Black state treasurer. Lamb recommended him to Governor John N. Dempsey for a judicial appointment.

Glass became the first African American juvenile court judge in Connecticut Juvenile Court in 1967. Eleven years later, Governor Ella Grasso appointed him to the bench of the Connecticut Superior Court in Waterbury in 1978, when the state's juvenile courts merged into the superior courts. In 1984, Glass became administrative judge for the judicial district of Waterbury.

Glass capped his distinguished career by serving as the first African American Justice of the Connecticut Supreme Court. He was nominated by Governor William A. O'Neill and served from June 22, 1987 until November 28, 1992, when he reached the court's mandatory retirement age of 70. During his five years on the state supreme court, Glass wrote 135 majority opinions.

Following retirement, he became a trial referee for the state. Glass was a Baptist and member of the Elks, Masons, and American Legion.

== Legacy ==
Glass died at home in Waterbury on November 27, 2001, a day short of his 79th birthday. He was survived by his wife, Doris (Powell) Glass; a son, Robert D. Glass, Jr.; two daughters, Roberta G. Brown and Rosalyn G. Roundtree, and two grandchildren. Doris Glass was a native of Norwich, Connecticut, and had persuaded her husband to move to Connecticut in the first place.

In honor of his late mother, Glass established the M. E. Glass Scholarship Fund to support NCCU School of Law students who exhibit “conspicuous determination by work and scholarship."

The Honorable Robert D. Glass Courthouse in Waterbury was named in his honor on May 19, 2008. In 2017, he was inducted into Silas Bronson Library’s Waterbury Hall of Fame.

== See also ==
- List of African-American jurists
- List of first minority male lawyers and judges in Connecticut

Political offices
Preceded by Joseph F. Dannehy	Justice of the Connecticut Supreme Court; 1987–1992	Succeeded by Richard N. Palmer
