= Edward J. Lopez =

Academic background
- Education: Texas A&M University

Academic work
- Discipline: Political economy
- School or tradition: Public-Choice

Edward J. Lopez is the BB&T Distinguished Professor of Capitalism at Western Carolina University and President of the Public Choice Society.

== Biography ==
=== Early life ===
He received a B.S. in economics from Texas A&M University and his Ph.D. from George Mason University in 1997.

=== Career ===
Before joining the faculty of San Jose State University in the fall of 2005, he held appointments at the University of North Texas, San Jose State University and George Mason University, and he served as staff economist on the Joint Economic Committee of Congress.

Lopez has authored numerous books, including The Pursuit of Justice and Property Rights. His most recent publication Madmen, Intellectuals, and Academic Scribblers is co-authored with Wayne A. Leighton.
