= Connecticut Supreme Court =

Highest court in the U.S. state of Connecticut

Coordinates: 41.762525°N 72.682972°W

- Seal of the State of Connecticut Judicial Branch

- The Connecticut State Library and Supreme Court Building (2026)
- Interactive map of Connecticut Supreme Court
- Established: 1784
- Jurisdiction: Connecticut, United States
- Location: Hartford, Connecticut
- Authorized by: Connecticut Constitution
- Appeals to: Supreme Court of the United States (for matters involving federal law or the U.S. Constitution only)
- Number of positions: 7
- Website: Official website

Chief Justice
- Currently: Raheem L. Mullins
- Since: January 30, 2025

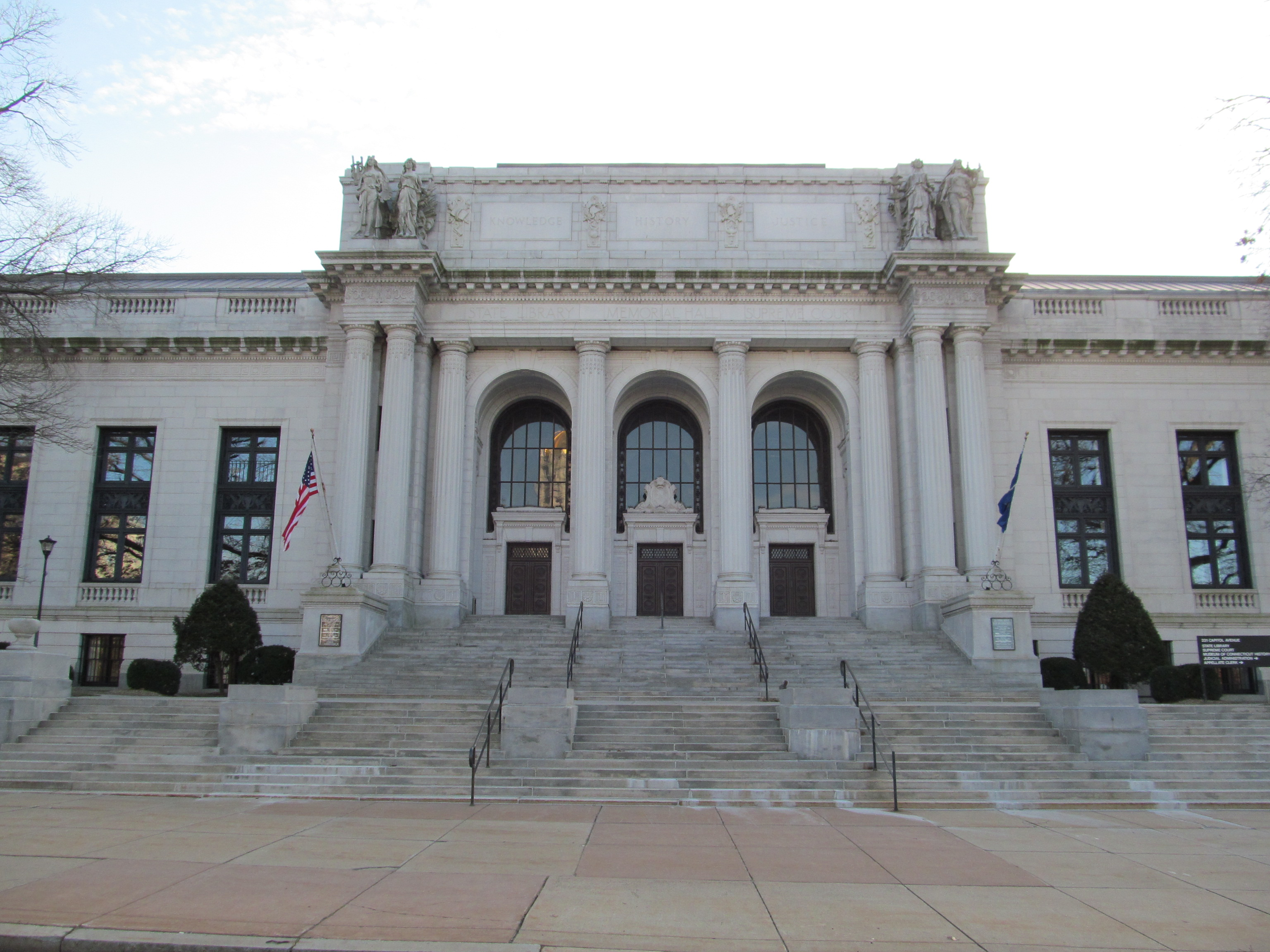
Supreme Court Building

The Connecticut Supreme Court, formerly known as the Connecticut Supreme Court of Errors, is the highest court in the U.S. state of Connecticut. It consists of a chief justice and six associate justices. The seven justices sit in Hartford, across the street from the Connecticut State Capitol. The court generally holds eight sessions of two to three weeks per year, with one session each September through November, and January through May. Justices are appointed by the governor and then approved by the Connecticut General Assembly.

== Current justices ==
Name	Born	Start	Term ends	Mandatory retirement	Appointer	Law school
Raheem L. Mullins, Chief Justice	March 10, 1978 (age 48)	November 1, 2017 (Note: Became acting chief justice on September 30, 2024. Formally confirmed as Chief Justice on January 30, 2025.)	2033	2048	Ned Lamont (D) (Note: Originally appointed by Governor Dannel Malloy (D) as an associate justice. Subsequently appointed by Governor Ned Lamont (D) as chief justice.)	Northeastern
Andrew J. McDonald	March 11, 1966 (age 60)	January 24, 2013	2029	2036	Dannel Malloy (D)	Connecticut
Gregory D'Auria	June 24, 1963 (age 63)	April 10, 2017	2033	2033	Dannel Malloy (D)	Connecticut
Steven D. Ecker	April 19, 1961 (age 65)	May 3, 2018	2031 (Note: Judge reaches the mandatory retirement deadline before the end of their term.)		Dannel Malloy (D)	Harvard
Nora Dannehy	March 11, 1961 (age 65)	September 26, 2023	2031		Ned Lamont (D)	Harvard
William H. Bright Jr.	August 15, 1962 (age 64)	March 5, 2025	2032		Ned Lamont (D)	Chicago
Melanie L. Cradle	1970 or 1971 (age 55–56)	August 5, 2026	2034	2040/2041	Ned Lamont (D)	Seton Hall

== Senior justices ==
Justices must retire upon reaching the age of 70. They may continue to hear cases as judge trial referees in the Superior Court or the Appellate Court. Justices may assume senior status before attaining age 70 and continue to sit with the Supreme Court, as needed. Multiple justices have availed themselves of this option. For example, Justice Ellen Ash Peters took senior status in 1996, continuing to sit until 2000, and Justice Angelo Santaniello assumed senior status in 1987 and continued to sit as needed until 1994. Justice Armentano assumed senior status in 1983 but continued to sit with the Court as needed. Chief Justice Callahan assumed senior status in 1999 but served for approximately another year as a senior justice. Chief Justice Sullivan assumed senior status in 2006 but continued to sit until 2009. Justice Vertefeuille assumed senior status in March 2022 and remained active with the Court until she turned 70 in October 2022.

In the event of a recusal or absence, a judge of the Appellate or Superior Court may be called to sit with the Supreme Court. One of the most recent instances of a lower court judge being called to "pinch-hit" was Judge Thomas Bishop of the Appellate Court in Bysiewicz v. Dinardo. Then-Appellate Court Judge Lubbie Harper Jr. (who later served as a justice of the Supreme Court) also sat with the Supreme Court in the landmark case of Kerrigan v. Commissioner of Public Health. Judge Francis X. Hennessy also frequently served by designation on the Court.

== Former justices ==
Notable former justices include:

- Anthony J. Armentano (1981–1985, senior justice 1983–1985), served as lieutenant governor and a member of the Supreme Court
- Raymond E. Baldwin (1949–1963), only person to serve as governor of Connecticut and chief justice
- Robert I. Berdon (1991–1999), an outspoken civil libertarian, authored 500 dissents in 8 years, opposed the death penalty, and authored the decision of State v. Geisler to assess claims of rights under the Connecticut Constitution, infra
- Joseph W. Bogdanski (1972–1981, chief justice 1981), modernized Connecticut jurisprudence, also an outspoken dissenter like Robert Berdon, served briefly as chief justice, part of the majority in Horton v. Messkill
- David M. Borden (1990–2007), one of the original members of the appellate court, drafter of Connecticut's Penal Code, first administrative judge for the appellate system, acting chief justice 2006–2007
- Alfred V. Covello (1987–1992), former federal district judge
- Robert D. Glass (1987–1992), first African-American named to the Supreme Court, namesake of Waterbury Juvenile Matters Courthouse
- Anthony Grillo (1983–1985), after nearly 20 prolific years as a trial judge, capped off his career on the Supreme Court and wrote 56 opinions, including the landmark Caldor v. Thornton
- Lubbie Harper Jr. (2011–2012), descendant of slaves from North Carolina. While an appellate court Judge, he was the swing vote in the gay marriage case, nominated to succeed Joette Katz, and ruling in two death penalty cases, State v. Komisarjevsky (writing the opinion for the Court on the limited question of sealing a witness list), and State v. Santiago (agreeing with former Justices Norcott, Katz and Berdon that the death penalty is cruel and unusual). Capped off his 15-year career as a member of the Supreme Court. Still active as a judge trial referee designated to the appellate court.
- Arthur Healey (1979–1990), also served with Ellen Ash Peters and David Shea and innovated state constitutional law, former chief judge of the Superior Court before the major judicial reorganization of 1978
- T. Clark Hull (1987–1991), former state senator and lieutenant governor
- Joette Katz (1993–2011), appointed at age 39, then the youngest justice ever appointed, sat on approximately 2,500 cases, authoring nearly 500 opinions. Notable cases include Sheff v. O'Neill, the landmark 1996 decision regarding civil rights and the right to education, where she was in the 4–3 majority; Kelo v. New London (2004), the eminent domain case, where she was in the minority; Kerrigan v. Commissioner of Public Health (2008), supporting gay marriage, where she was in the 4–3 majority; and writing the majority opinion in Rosado v. Bridgeport Roman Catholic Diocesan Corp (2009). She also served as administrative judge for the state appellate system. She was the first public defender and second woman to serve on the court. After retiring, she served as commissioner of the Connecticut Department of Children and Families for eight years.
- William M. Maltbie (1925–1950, chief justice 1930–1950)
- Francis M. McDonald, Jr. (1996–2001, chief justice 1999–2001), former Waterbury state's attorney, another dissenter like Robert Berdon (and his occasional ally), successfully integrated the sheriffs into the judicial branch as judicial marshals and state marshals, appointed a new lawyer grievance review panel, reduced a civil and criminal backlog, and worked to give the appellate court its own courthouse
- C. Ian McLachlan (2009–2012), retired from the court and entered private practice
- Leo Parskey (1979–1985), scholar who served with Ellen Ash Peters, Arthur Healey, and David Shea
- Ellen Ash Peters (1978–2000, 1984–1996 as chief justice), first woman to serve on the court, innovated Connecticut constitutional law, still active as a judge trial referee
- Tapping Reeve (1798–1823, chief justice 1814–1823), succeeded Stephen Mix Mitchell, founded Litchfield Law School
- Angelo Santaniello (1985–1994, senior justice 1987–1994), innovated the Pre-Argument Conference (PAC) program for settling appeals before oral arguments, ran the "Supreme Court on Circuit" program taking the Court throughout Connecticut; still sat regularly with the Court as a senior justice
- Barry R. Schaller (2007–2008), one of two men to sit at every level of Connecticut's judiciary
- James C. Shannon (1965–1966), Connecticut's 69th lieutenant governor 1947–1948; sworn in as governor of Connecticut on March 7, 1948, upon the death of sitting Governor James L. McConaughy
- Christine S. Vertefeuille (2000–2020) former associate of the Connecticut Appellate Court
- Peter Zarella (2001–2016), former chair of the Connecticut Criminal Justice Commission and Rules Committee

== History of the court ==
The Supreme Court of Connecticut was created in 1784. Prior to this, the power to review lower court rulings was vested in the General Assembly, which determined appeals by examining trial court records. Even after its creation, the Court was not completely independent of the executive and legislative branches, since its members included the lieutenant governor, members of the council (or upper chamber of the General Assembly), and, in 1794, the governor.

In 1806, the number of Superior Court judges was increased from five to nine and those judges, sitting together, constituted the Supreme Court, replacing the governor, lieutenant governor and council members. The General Assembly, however, retained the power to overturn the court's rulings. Twelve years later, in 1818, the Connecticut Constitution established an independent judiciary, with the Supreme Court of Errors as the state's highest court. (The words "of Errors" referred to writs of error and were deleted in 1965). The creation of an independent judiciary established the third branch of government, which is responsible for interpreting the laws enacted by the legislative branch of government.

In 1982, in response to an overwhelming Supreme Court docket, Connecticut's voters approved a constitutional amendment creating the intermediate Connecticut Appellate Court.

== Notable decisions ==
=== Horton v. Meskill (1977) ===
The court's ruling on April 19, 1977, in Horton v. Meskill (172 Conn. 615) held that the right to education in Connecticut is so basic and fundamental that any intrusion on the right must be strictly scrutinized. The Court said that public school students are entitled to equal enjoyment of the right to education, and a system of school financing that relied on local property tax revenues without regard to disparities in town wealth and that lacked significant equalizing state support was unconstitutional. It could not pass the test of strict judicial scrutiny. The Court also held that the creation of a constitutional system for education financing is a job for the legislature and not the courts. Chief Justice House wrote the majority opinion. Justices Bogdanski, Longo, and Barber concurred in the decision, and Justice Bogdanski filed a concurring opinion. Justice Loiselle dissented from the majority opinion.

=== State v. Geisler (1992) ===
The Court (610 A.2d 1225), speaking through Justice Robert I. Berdon, delineated a six-factor test to assess claims of rights under the Connecticut Constitution. The six factors are:

1. Text of the Connecticut Constitution
2. Holdings and dicta of the State Supreme Court and of the Appellate Court
3. Federal precedents
4. Sister state decisions
5. History and a historical approach—e.g. the debates of the framers of the Connecticut Constitution
6. Economic and sociological considerations—e.g. public policy

This test has subsequently formed the underpinnings of subsequent decisions interpreting and guiding the meaning of the Connecticut Constitution, including that the Connecticut Constitution affords greater protections than its Federal counterpart—including the Kerrigan decision discussed below, and Connecticut Coalition for Justice in Educational Funding v. Rell. Chief Justice Ellen Ash Peters and Justice David Shea and Justice Robert Glass joined Justice Berdon's majority opinion. Justice Alfred Covello dissented.

=== Sheff v. O'Neill (1996) ===
Sheff v. O'Neill is a landmark Connecticut Supreme Court decision (Sheff v. O'Neill, 238 Conn. 1, 678 A.2d 1267) regarding civil rights and the right to education. On July 9, 1996, the Connecticut Supreme Court ruled that the state had an affirmative obligation to provide Connecticut's school children with a substantially equal educational opportunity and that this constitutionally guaranteed right encompasses the access to a public education which is not substantially and materially impaired by racial and ethnic isolation. This was a split 4–3 decision, which was authored by Chief Justice Ellen Ash Peters. Peters was joined in the majority opinion by Justices Robert Berdon, Flemming L. Norcott, Jr., and Joette Katz. Justice David M. Borden authored the dissent, with Justices Robert Callahan and Richard Palmer concurring.

=== Kelo v. City of New London (2004) ===
One of the most important cases the court has decided was Kelo v. City of New London (2004), appealed to the U.S. Supreme Court. The state court sided with the city in a 4–3 decision, with the majority opinion authored by Justice Norcott and joined by Justices Borden, Palmer and Vertefeuille. Justice Zarella wrote an unusually lengthy and considered dissent (joined by Justices Sullivan and Katz), due to the importance of the case and the high likelihood that the United States Supreme Court would grant certiorari. The U.S. Supreme Court upheld the Connecticut Supreme Court's decision in favor of the city, in a 5–4 decision, with the dissent written by Justice Sandra Day O'Connor and joined by Chief Justice William Rehnquist and Justices Antonin Scalia and Clarence Thomas. The Kelo decision is studied as a continuation of the expansion of governments' power to seize property through eminent domain, although the widespread negative popular reaction has spurred a backlash in which many state legislatures have curtailed their eminent domain power.

=== Office of the Governor v. Select Committee of Inquiry (2004) ===
On Monday, June 21, 2004, Gov. John G. Rowland announced his resignation amid allegations of graft and a movement to impeach him for accepting gifts. The resignation came several days after the Court ruled on June 18 that the state House Select Committee of Inquiry, which was weighing whether to impeach Rowland, could compel the governor to testify.

Those joining the majority in this opinion (Office of the Governor v. Selected Committee of Inquiry to Recommend Whether Sufficient Grounds Exist for the House of Representatives to Impeach Governor John G. Rowland Pursuant to Article Ninth of the State Constitution, SC 17211), included Justices Borden, Norcott, Katz, Palmer and Vertefeuille. In an extraordinary action, all five majority justices signed their names as authors of the opinion. Dissenting were Chief Justice Sullivan and Justice Zarella.

=== Kerrigan v. Commissioner of Public Health (2008) ===
On October 10, 2008, the court ruled in Kerrigan v. Commissioner of Public Health that gay and lesbian couples could not be denied the right to marry because of the Equal Protection Clause of the state constitution. This decision made Connecticut the third state (along with Massachusetts and California) to legalize same-sex marriage through judicial decree of the state supreme court. Chief Justice Rogers, who did not participate in the decision, was replaced by appellate Judge Lubbie Harper Jr. The majority opinion was written by Justice Palmer, and joined by Justices Norcott, Katz, and Judge Harper. Justices Zarella, Vertefeuille, and Borden dissented.

=== Rosado v. Bridgeport Roman Catholic Diocesan Corp. (2009) ===
In George L. Rosado et al. v. Bridgeport Roman Catholic Diocesan Corporation et al. (SC 17807), 292 Conn. 1 (2009) the majority opinion of the court, authored by Justice Katz, and joined by Chief Justice Rogers, and Justices Palmer and Vertefeuille, effectively ordered the Roman Catholic Diocese of Bridgeport to release thousands of legal documents from previous lawsuits filed against priests accused of sexually abusing children. A dissenting opinion was authored by Justice Sullivan. The Connecticut Supreme Court case stemmed from a suit brought by the Boston Globe, Hartford Courant, The New York Times and The Washington Post in 2002. On October 5, 2009, the United States Supreme Court rejected a request by the diocese for the court to stay or reconsider the Connecticut opinion ordering the release of the documents. The documents were released at the Waterbury Superior Courthouse on December 1, 2009. The diocese has provided background and a statement on the suit and its status.

=== State v. Santiago (2015) ===
In State v. Santiago, 318 Conn. 1, the Connecticut Supreme Court held that, after the state legislature had abolished capital punishment for prospective cases in 2012, imposition of the death penalty for already convicted and sentenced prisoners was unconstitutional under the Constitution of Connecticut as "excessive and disproportionate punishment". Justice Palmer authored the 4–3 majority opinion holding the death penalty as violating the state constitution's prohibition against cruel and unusual punishment while the dissenters (Chief Justice Rogers and Justices Zarella and Espinosa) charged the majority with substituting its own judgment for that of the legislature, which in 2012 had declined retrospective effect of Public Act 12-5 (P.A. 12–5), An Act Revising the Penalty for Capital Felonies.

== See also ==
- Courts of Connecticut
- List of justices of the Connecticut Supreme Court

== Sources ==
- Connecticut's Dissenting Justice
- Outspoken Judge Enlivens Quiet Court (published 1993)
- Lone Justice
- Protection for Evaluators of Child Abuse
- Justice Berdon's Legacy of Compassion
