= William J. Sullivan =

American judge (1939–2022)

William J. Sullivan (March 12, 1939 – June 6, 2022) was an American judge trial referee of the Connecticut Superior Court. He served as chief justice of the Connecticut Supreme Court. He was appointed to the Connecticut Appellate Court by Gov. John G. Rowland in 1997 and remained there until his elevation to the Connecticut Supreme Court in 1999. Justice Sullivan was nominated to be Chief Justice by Gov. Rowland in 2000 and was appointed to the Connecticut Supreme Court in 2001. Justice Sullivan took senior status on April 15, 2006 and continued to serve as a Senior Justice until 2009, when he attained the age of 70. Sullivan previously served in the Connecticut State Senate from 1971 until 1984.

Sullivan was born in Waterbury, Connecticut and was a much-decorated veteran, serving in the Vietnam War and attaining the rank of captain in the United States Army. During his service he was awarded the Air Medal and various campaign ribbons and received two Bronze Stars for merit.

The court became embroiled in a lengthy ethics scandal in 2006 when it was revealed that retiring Chief Justice Sullivan postponed the publication of a controversial decision opposing Freedom of Information Act requests for documents that track the status and history of legal cases in the Connecticut legal system until hearings for his nominated successor Justice Peter T. Zarella were completed. Legislators speculated that Sullivan delayed the publication of the court's opinion because he feared it might damage Zarella's chances of becoming chief justice. Both justices ruled in favor of the restrictions. Governor M. Jodi Rell accepted the withdrawal of Zarella's nomination to be chief justice. After Sullivan's actions were reported, Sullivan was referred to the Judicial Review Council, which suspended him for violating judicial ethics rules. This suspension is being appealed. During a judiciary committee hearing in which Sullivan was questioned, he apologized for his actions.

Justice Sullivan remained active as a Judge Trial Referee and sat regularly with the Connecticut Appellate Court until his death.

Connecticut State Senate
Preceded by James E. Tansley	Member of the Connecticut State Senate from the 16th district 1971–1984	Succeeded by Joe Markley
