= Richard N. Palmer =

American judge

Richard Palmer

Chief Justice of the Connecticut Supreme Court Acting
- In office February 5, 2018 – May 3, 2018
- Preceded by: Chase T. Rogers
- Succeeded by: Richard A. Robinson

Associate Justice of the Connecticut Supreme Court
- In office March 7, 1993 – May 27, 2020
- Succeeded by: Christine Keller

United States Attorney for the District of Connecticut
- In office 1991–1991
- Appointed by: George H. W. Bush
- Preceded by: Stanley Twardy
- Succeeded by: Albert S. Dabrowski

Personal details
- Born: May 27, 1950 (age 76) Hartford, Connecticut, U.S.
- Education: Trinity College, Connecticut (BA); University of Connecticut, Hartford (JD)

Richard N. Palmer (born May 27, 1950) is a former Associate Justice of the Connecticut Supreme Court.

Palmer was born in Hartford, Connecticut. Palmer received his Bachelor of Arts Phi Beta Kappa, from Trinity College in Hartford in 1972. He went on to receive the Juris Doctor with high honors from the University of Connecticut School of Law, in 1977.

Following law school, Palmer clerked for Judge Jon O. Newman, then of the United States District Court for the District of Connecticut. After practicing privately with Shipman & Goodwin, Palmer was an Assistant United States Attorney in the U.S. Attorney's Office for the District of Connecticut, interrupted briefly by a stint in the firm of Chatigny and Palmer. In 1991, Palmer served as the United States Attorney in Connecticut, and subsequently became Chief State's Attorney for the State of Connecticut. On March 17, 1993, he was sworn in as an associate justice of the Connecticut Supreme Court.

On October 10, 2008, Palmer wrote the majority opinion for the Connecticut Supreme Court case Kerrigan v. Commissioner of Public Health, granting marriage rights to same-sex couples in Connecticut, striking down a law passed in 2005 granting civil union rights to them.

Palmer retired on May 27, 2020, upon reaching the mandatory retirement age.

Legal offices
Preceded by Robert D. Glass	Justice of the Connecticut Supreme Court; 1993–2020	Succeeded by Christine Keller
Preceded by Chase T. Rogers	Chief Justice of the Connecticut Supreme Court; Acting; 2018	Succeeded by Richard A. Robinson
