= List of justices of the Connecticut Supreme Court =

This is a list of justices of the Connecticut Supreme Court.

== Connecticut Supreme Court justices ==
=== Supreme Court of Errors (1784–1807) ===
A total of 47 justices served on the Supreme Court of Errors.

Judge	Began active service	Ended active service
Andrew Adams	1784	1790
Joseph Platt Cooke	1784	1803
Oliver Ellsworth	1784	1785
Jabez Hamlin	1784	1785
Benjamin Huntington	1784	1790
Samuel Huntington	1784	1787
Richard Law	1784	1789
Stephen Mix Mitchell	1783	1793
William Pitkin IV	1784	1785
Roger Sherman	1784	1785
Joseph Spencer	1784	1789
William Williams	1784	1803
Oliver Wolcott	1784	1797
William Hillhouse	1785	1807
William Samuel Johnson	1786	1789
Erastus Wolcott	1786	1790
John Treadwell	1786	1808
Jonathan Sturges	1786	1789
James Wadsworth	1787	1788
John Chester	1788	1792
James Hillhouse	1789	1793
Jedediah Strong	1789	1791
Jesse Root	1789	1790
James Davenport	1790	1797
Roger Newberry	1790	1807
Heman Swift	1790	1802
John Chandler	1790	1795
Benjamin Huntington	1791	1793
Amasa Learned	1791	1792
Jonathan Ingersoll	1792	1798
Tapping Reeve	1792	1792
Asher Miller	1793	1794
Thomas Grosvenor	1793	1802
Thomas Seymour	1793	1803
Samuel Huntington	1794	1796
Aaron Austin	1794	1807
Jeremiah Wadsworth	1795	1801
Jonathan Trumbull Jr.	1796	1807
David Daggett	1797	1805
Jonathan Brace	1798	1799
Zephaniah Swift	1799	1800
Nathaniel Smith	1799	1804
John Allen	1800	1806
Zephaniah Swift	1801	1801
Oliver Ellsworth	1802	1807
Jonathan Brace	1802	1807
Chauncey Goodrich	1802	1807
John Chester	1803	1807
William Edmond	1803	1807
Elizur Goodrich	1803	1807
Matthew Griswold Jr.	1805	1807
Stephen Hosmer	1805	1807
Asher Miller	1806	1807
Henry Champion	1806	1807

=== Connecticut Supreme Court (after 1807) ===
Judge	Began active service	Ended active service
Tapping Reeve	1808	1815
Zephaniah Swift	1808	1819
John Trumbull	1808	1819
William Edmond	1808	1819
Nathaniel Smith	1808	1819
Jeremiah Gates Brainard	1808	1829
Simeon Baldwin	1808	1817
Roger Griswold	1808	1809
John Cotton Smith	1809	1811
Jonathan Ingersoll	1811	1816
Calvin Goddard	1815	1818
Stephen Hosmer	1815	1833
James Gould	1816	1819
John Thompson Peters	1818	1834
Asa Chapman	1818	1825
William Bristol	1819	1826
James Lanman	1826	1829
David Daggett	1826	1834
Thomas Scott Williams	1829	1847
Clark Bissell	1829	1839
Samuel Church	1833	1854
Jabez W. Huntington	1834	1840
Henry Matson Waite	1834	1857
Roger Minott Sherman	1839	1842
William L. Storrs	1840	1861
Joel Hinman	1842	1870
William W. Ellsworth	1847	1861
David C. Sanford	1854	1864
John Duane Park	1864	1889
Thomas B. Butler	1861	1873
Charles J. McCurdy	1863	1867
Henry Dutton	1861	1866
Elisha Carpenter	1866	1894
James Phelps	1873	1875
Dwight Whitefield Pardee	1873	1890
Dwight Loomis	1875	1891
Miles T. Granger	1876	1887
Lafayette S. Foster	1870	1876
Origen S. Seymour	1870	1874
Sidney Burr Beardsley	1887	1889
Charles B. Andrews	1889	1901
David Torrance	1890	1906
Augustus H. Fenn	1893	1897
Edward W. Seymour	1889	1892
Frederick B. Hall	1897	1913
Samuel O. Prentice	1901	1920
John M. Thayer	1907	1917
Silas A. Robinson	1910	1910 (seven months)
Simeon E. Baldwin	1893	1910
William Hamersley	1894	1908
Milton A. Shumway	1917	1918
Alberto T. Roraback	1908	1919
George W. Wheeler	1910	1930
John K. Beach	1913	1925
Edward B. Gager	1918	1922
William S. Case	1919	1921
Howard J. Curtis	1920	1927
Lucien F. Burpee	1921	1924
John E. Keeler	1922	1926
John P. Kellogg	1924	1925
William M. Maltbie	1925	1950
Frank D. Haines	1925	1936
George E. Hinman	1926	1940
John W. Banks	1927	1937
Christopher L. Avery	1930	1942
Allyn L. Brown	1936	1953
Newell Jennings	1937	1953
Arthur F. Ells	1940	1949
Edwin C. Dickenson	1942	1950
Raymond E. Baldwin	1949	1963
Ernest A. Inglis	1950	1957
Patrick B. O'Sullivan	1950	1957
John A. Cornell	1953	1953 (four months)
Edward J. Quinlan	1953	1954
Kenneth Wynne	1953	1958
Edward J. Daly	1954	1959
John Hamilton King	1957	1970
James E. Murphy	1957	1966
Samuel Mellitz	1958	1961
William J. Shea	1959	1965
Abraham S. Bordon	1961	1961 (five months)
Howard W. Alcorn	1961	1971
John M. Comley	1963	1965
James C. Shannon	1965	1966
Charles S. House	1965	1978
John P. Cotter	1965	1981
John R. Thim	1966	1972
Elmer W. Ryan	1966	1972
Louis Shapiro	1970	1975
Alva Loiselle	1971	1980
Herbert S. MacDonald	1972	1977
Joseph Bogdanski	1972	1981
Joseph S. Longo	1975	1979
William P. Barber	1975	1977
John A. Speziale	1977	1984
Ellen Ash Peters	1978	2000
Arthur H. Healey	1979	1990
Leo Parskey	1980	1985
Anthony J. Armentano	1981	1983
David M. Shea	1981	1992
Anthony E. Grillo	1983	1985
Joseph F. Dannehy	1984	1987
Angelo G. Santaniello	1985	1987
Robert J. Callahan	1985	2000
Robert D. Glass	1987	1992
Alfred V. Covello	1987	1992
T. Clark Hull	1987	1991
David M. Borden	1990	2007
Robert I. Berdon	1991	1999
Flemming L. Norcott Jr.	1992	2013
Joette Katz	1992	2011
Richard N. Palmer	1993	2020
Francis M. McDonald	1996	2001
William J. Sullivan	1999	2009
Christine S. Vertefeuille	2000	2010
Peter T. Zarella	2001	2016
Chase T. Rogers	2007	2018
Barry R. Schaller	2007	2008
C. Ian McLachlan	2009	2012
Dennis G. Eveleigh	2010	2017
Lubbie Harper Jr.	2011	2012
Carmen E. Espinosa	2013	2017
Richard A. Robinson	2013	2024
Andrew J. McDonald	2013	Incumbent
Gregory D'Auria	2017	Incumbent
Raheem L. Mullins	2017	Incumbent
Maria Araújo Kahn	2017	2023
Steven D. Ecker	2018	Incumbent
Christine Keller	2020	2022
Joan K. Alexander	2022	2026
Nora Dannehy	2023	Incumbent
William H. Bright Jr.	2025	Incumbent
Melanie L. Cradle	2026	Incumbent
