= David C. Sanford =

American judge (c. 1798–1864)

David Curtis Sanford (c. 1798 – May 10, 1864) was a Connecticut lawyer who served as a justice of the Connecticut Supreme Court from 1854 to 1864.

== Early life, education, and career ==
Born in New Milford, Connecticut, Sanford's early opportunities for education were limited and he was self-made. His father was a country merchant, with only a common school education, with which Sanford assisted. He began reading law at the age of nineteen; first, for a short time in the office of Perry Smith at New Milford, and soon after for a considerable time in that of Seth P. Beers at Litchfield. He subsequently completed his three years of study at the law school of Judge Asa Chapman at Newtown, and was admitted to the bar in Fairfield county in August, 1820, at the age of twenty-two.

He opened an office in New Milford, but within a few months removed to Litchfield. Soon after, Beers, who had an extensive practice at Litchfield, invited Sanford to a partnership, which he accepted. Their connection continued until Beers accepted the office of Commissioner of the School Fund and left the business entirely to Sanford, who practiced in Litchfield until 1832, when he moved to Norwalk for a year, thereafter returning to New Milford.

== Legislative and judicial service ==
In 1839, Sanford was appointed to serve as a state attorney, and in 1854 was elected as a Whig to the Connecticut State Senate, where he served as chairman of the judiciary committee and "took a leading part in moulding the legislation of that year". During that session, Sanford was elected a Judge of the Superior and Supreme Courts to fill a vacancy caused by the death of Chief Justice Samuel Church and the promotion of judge Waite to the office of chief justice.

Sanford was an active member of the Episcopal Church. He died at his residence in New Milford, Connecticut, following a lung infection at the age of 66.

Political offices
| Preceded by Samuel Church | Justice of the Connecticut Supreme Court; 1854–1864 | Succeeded by John Duane Park |
