= David Sanford =

David Sanford may refer to:

- David Sanford (New York attorney) (born 1957), American attorney
- David Sanford (composer) (born 1963), American composer and jazz bandleader
- David C. Sanford (c. 1798–1864), justice of the Connecticut Supreme Court
- David H. Sanford (1937–2022), American philosopher
