= Dwight Whitefield Pardee =

American judge (1822–1893)

Dwight Whitefield Pardee (1822 – October 6, 1893) was a justice of the Connecticut Supreme Court from 1873 to 1890. Pardee served as a judge for over 26 years, between his time on the Superior Court and the Supreme Court.

== Early life ==
Born in Bristol, Connecticut, Pardee was the son of Jared W. Pardee, a prominent physician. Pardee entered Trinity College at Hartford at the age of fourteen, graduating in 1840. After graduation he pursued a course of legal study, in part reading law under Isaac Toucey, later United States Attorney General, and in part at Yale Law School. After his admission to the bar, Pardee settled in Hartford, Connecticut, practicing for a time in partnership with Toucey. He was described as "a very modest man and of a retiring disposition", who "rarely appeared upon a public platform or took an active part in public meetings".

== Judicial service ==
In 1863, Pardee was elected a judge of the Superior Court, and in 1873 of the Supreme Court. In the latter court he served two terms of eight years each, retiring at the end of his second term in the sixty-eighth year of his age. While at the bar he was elected for two successive years to the state senate from the Hartford District. In 1878 Trinity College conferred upon him the degree of Doctor of Laws.

== Personal life ==
In 1847, Pardee married Henrietta Porter, daughter of Solomon Porter, for many years one of the prominent citizens of Hartford. She died in 1863. Their only child had died a short time before. He never married again. His family consisted for the rest of his life of his two unmarried sisters, with later a sister who was a widow. All three sisters survived him.

He was a devoted member of the Episcopal Church, and devoutly attended services, serving in his later life as senior warden of St. John's Parish in Hartford. He took great interest in Trinity College and was for many years one of its trustees, and made it the ultimate legatee of a large part of his estate.

Pardee died in Hartford.

Political offices
Preceded by John Duane Park	Justice of the Connecticut Supreme Court; 1873–1890	Succeeded by David Torrance
