= Ian McLachlan (disambiguation) =

Ian McLachlan (born 1936) is a former Australian politician who served as a member of the House of Representatives from 1990 to 1998.

Ian McLachlan may also refer to:

- Ian McLachlan (writer), Canadian writer and academic
- Ian Dougald McLachlan (1911–1991), Royal Australian Air Force officer
- C. Ian McLachlan (born 1942), justice of the Connecticut Supreme Court
