= Thim =

Thim is a surname. Notable people with the surname include:

- Choy Mow Thim (born 1947), Malaysian cyclist
- John R. Thim (1902–1988), justice of the Connecticut Supreme Court
- Lee Yoon Thim (1905–1977), Malaysian-Chinese architect

== See also ==
- Tim
