= General Wolcott =

General Wolcott may refer to:

- Erastus Wolcott (1722–1793), Connecticut State Militia brigadier general in the American Revolutionary War
- Oliver Wolcott (1726–1797), Connecticut State Militia major general in the American Revolutionary War

== See also ==
- Attorney General Wolcott (disambiguation)
