= John M. Thayer (judge) =

American judge (1847–1923)

John Mowry Thayer (March 15, 1847 – January 13, 1923) was a justice of the Connecticut Supreme Court from 1907 to 1917.

== Biography ==
Born in New Boston, Connecticut, a borough of the town of Thompson, Thayer attended the public school of his town and Nichols Academy at Dudley, Massachusetts. He graduated from Yale College in 1869. Immediately after his graduation, he began the study of law in the office of James A. Hovey at Norwich, and was admitted to the Bar of New London County, September 19, 1871.

He began his professional career at Burlington, Iowa, but returned to Norwich about a year later, and formed a law partnership with his brother, Charles F. Thayer, which continued as long as he was in active practice. He served as a judge of the City Court of Norwich from 1875 to 1877. He became State's Attorney for New London County in 1883 and served as such until he was appointed as a judge of the Superior Court in 1889. In 1907, he was advanced to a position on the state Supreme Court, serving as a justice of that court until he was retired by age limit on March 15, 1917.

Thayer then served as chairman of the Federal Draft Board of his district, during World War I.

== Personal life ==
Thayer never married and lived to some extent the life of a recluse. He died in Norwich.

Political offices
Preceded by David Torrance	Justice of the Connecticut Supreme Court; 1907–1917	Succeeded by Milton A. Shumway
