= State v. Golding =

- Court: Connecticut Supreme Court
- Full case name: State of Connecticut v. Monica Golding
- Decided: December 19, 1989
- Citation: 213 Conn. 233 (Conn. 1989) 567 A.2d 823

Case history
- Appealed from: Connecticut Appellate Court

Case opinions
- Claims of constitutional errors can be heard on appeal, even if not preserved during trial, if 1)The record is adequate to review the alleged claim of error; 2)The claim is of constitutional magnitude alleging the violation of a fundamental right; 3)The alleged constitutional violation clearly exists and clearly deprived the defendant of a fair trial; and 4)If subject to harmless error analysis, the state has failed to demonstrate harmlessness of the alleged constitutional violation beyond a reasonable doubt.
- Decision by: Robert J. Callahan

State v. Golding, 213 Conn. 233 (1989), is a decision of the Connecticut Supreme Court that held that claims of violations of fundamental rights must be heard on appeal even if they were not raised at the trial level. Together with the 1973 case State v. Evans, it established the common law Golding-Evans review standard as precedent in Connecticut jurisprudence.

== Background ==
In 1983, Monica Golding was receiving welfare assistance, and this required her to notify the city of Hartford (through her social worker) about changes in her financial circumstances, such as assets and income. For example, in November 1983 she told the social worker there were eight people living in her household, and in December she said it had decreased to three, and the assistance money she was given was reduced as a result. She never reported having income, but it was later discovered that she was getting about $600 per month in June and July 1984, and there were actually nine people in her household in the first half of 1984, not three. She was charged with one count of larceny in the second degree, one count of fraud in obtaining aid, one count of conspiracy to commit larceny, and one count of conspiracy to commit fraud in obtaining aid. She was found guilty by a jury in the Superior Court in Hartford, and the judge ordered her to pay $877.90 in restitution and perform 200 hours of community service.

=== Appeal ===
Golding appealed to the Connecticut Appellate Court. First, she claimed that the separate charges of larceny and aid fraud amounted to double jeopardy, violating the Fifth Amendment, but the Court disagreed, since "[i]t is possible to commit one of the offenses . . . without first having committed the other." Second, she argued the statute defining the penalties for aid fraud was unconstitutionally vague; the Court disagreed, simply noting that statute clearly said the penalties for larceny applied. Third, she asserted the jury instructions were flawed, both in not asking them to determine the amount (the figure of $877.90 had been determined by the judge), and in not clearly stating that their verdict should be unanimous. The amount, the Court, held, was not "one of the elements of the offense," and did not need to be included. Also, although the instructions had not said that the jury had to be unanimous about which legal alternative they were choosing in their verdict (and they did need to be unanimous), the instructions did discuss unanimity elsewhere; thus "viewed as a whole," the need for a unanimous verdict had been adequately addressed.

Golding's last argument on appeal was that letting the judge decide the restitution amount—in a jury trial, that is, where determining the facts is the jury's responsibility—violated the Due Process clauses of the U.S. Constitution and the Connecticut Constitution. However, Golding had not objected to the jury instructions during the trial, which normally meant she couldn't raise the issue on appeal. There was a "bypass" to this rule, under State v. Evans, but it only applied when a "fundamental constitutional right" was at stake. The Court held that due process was not actually at stake in Golding's case, and in any event the trial court's actions had been proper.

== Decision of the Connecticut Supreme Court ==
The Connecticut Supreme Court agreed to hear Golding's appeal from this ruling, and in 1989 it reversed.

It began by noting that larceny was divided by statute (General Statutes of Connecticut 53a-122 through 53a-125b) into six degrees, the first degree being the most serious and the sixth the least serious. The only difference between the degrees was the value of property illegally taken, but punishments ranged from a maximum of 20 years in prison/$10,000 fine, for the first degree, to a maximum three months/$250 for the sixth degree. With that in mind, Justice Callahan wrote for the Court that "The overwhelming weight of authority is that the value of property stolen or obtained by fraud is an essential element of the crime when the value is used to differentiate between a felony and a misdemeanor or to determine the severity of the offense and the consequent punishment for a convicted offender." Therefore, the trial court was wrong not to instruct the jury that the amount had to be proven beyond a reasonable doubt, and moreover it was a violation of constitutional due process.

That left the Court to consider the application of the Evans standard; the state urged them not only to uphold Golding's conviction, but also to revise the Evans standard itself to something less open to interpretation. On this question, the Court wrote:

We have reviewed our own cases and those of the Appellate Court, and we agree with the state that they demonstrate disparate approaches to the Evans criteria. Upon reflection, we have decided neither to adopt a pure plain error standard for alleged constitutional violations, nor to attempt to reconcile past Evans decisions. Instead, we articulate guidelines designed to facilitate a less burdensome, more uniform application of the present Evans standard in future cases involving alleged constitutional violations that are raised for the first time on appeal.
Relying on the methodology of State v. Whistnant, we hold that a defendant can prevail on a claim of constitutional error not preserved at trial only if all of the following conditions are met: (1) the record is adequate to review the alleged claim of error; (2) the claim is of constitutional magnitude alleging the violation of a fundamental right; (3) the alleged constitutional violation clearly exists and clearly deprived the defendant of a fair trial; and (4) if subject to harmless error analysis, the state has failed to demonstrate harmlessness of the alleged constitutional violation beyond a reasonable doubt.

— State v. Golding, 213 Conn. at 239 (Justice Callahan, writing for the court) (citation omitted)

The Court held that the Appellate Court had been incorrect in asserting that Golding did not have a real constitutional claim, and announced a revision of the Evans standard for claims that had not been properly raised during trial. This four-part test would become known as the Golding-Evans standard.

== Golding-Evans review ==
Judicial review standards are often established under common law because of stare decisis. The Golding-Evans standard of review, which was established by this case and by State v. Evans, allows a claim of constitutional error to be review by a court of appeal, in spite of not being preserved at trial, if four conditions are met:

1. The record is adequate to review the alleged claim of error;
2. The claim is of constitutional magnitude alleging the violation of a fundamental right;
3. The alleged constitutional violation clearly exists and clearly deprived the defendant of a fair trial; and
4. If subject to harmless error analysis, the state has failed to demonstrate harmlessness of the alleged constitutional violation beyond a reasonable doubt.

The burden of proof for all four elements is on the party making the appeal. It applies in both civil and criminal cases.
