= Justice Church =

Justice Church may refer to:

- Samuel Church (1785–1854), chief justice of the Connecticut Supreme Court
- Sanford E. Church (1815–1880), chief judge of the New York Court of Appeals
- William E. Church (1841–1917), associate justice of the South Dakota Supreme Court
