= Justice Chapman =

Justice Chapman may refer to:

- Asa Chapman (1770–1825), associate justice of the Connecticut Supreme Court
- Frederick Chapman (judge) (1849–1936), New Zealand Supreme Court Judge
- Roy H. Chapman (1883–1952), associate justice of the Florida Supreme Court
