= Asa Chapman =

American judge (1770–1825)

- 1824 portrait of Chapman

Judge of the Connecticut Supreme Court of Errors
- In office 1818 – September 25, 1825

Personal details
- Born: September 2, 1770 Saybrook, Connecticut
- Died: September 25, 1825 (aged 55) New Haven, Connecticut, U.S.
- Spouse: Mary Perry
- Children: Four, including Charles Chapman
- Education: Yale College; Litchfield Law School
- Profession: Lawyer, judge, legal educator

Asa Chapman (September 2, 1770 – September 25, 1825) was an American lawyer, politician, and legal educator, who served as a justice of the Connecticut Supreme Court from 1818 to 1825. Before joining the bench, he practiced law in Newtown, Connecticut, repeatedly representing the town in the Connecticut General Assembly, and served on the Governor's Council. Chapman also instructed law students for many years, first at Newtown and, during the final year of his life, at a law school he established in New Haven.

== Early life, education, and legal career ==
Born in Saybrook, Connecticut, the third son of Phineas Chapman and Mary Hillier Chapman, he prepared for college under the Rev. Frederick W. Hotchkiss, the pastor of his local church. He was graduated from Yale University in 1792, in the same class as Eli Whitney, Roger Minott Sherman, William Marchant, and William Botsford.

Following his graduation, Chapman taught at academies in North Salem, New York, and Norwalk, Connecticut, for two years while continuing his legal studies. He studied law under Tapping Reeve at the Litchfield Law School, was admitted to the bar in 1795, and established a law practice in Newtown, Connecticut. Throughout his practice, he also provided instruction to law students.

== Political and judicial service ==
Chapman represented Newtown in the Connecticut House of Representatives across six legislative sessions between 1801 and 1815. In 1817, he was elected to the Governor's Council.

Following the rise of the Toleration Party a political coalition that successfully overturned Federalist dominance and passed the Connecticut Constitution of 1818 the state judicial system was restructured, reducing the number of Supreme Court judges from nine to five. While most incumbent Federalist judges were retired, Chapman was appointed to the newly configured Connecticut Supreme Court in 1818 as one of three new judges selected under the Toleration administration. He served on the bench until his death.

In the autumn of 1824, Chapman relocated from Newtown to New Haven, Connecticut, where he opened a private law school. However, failing health forced him to abandon the enterprise shortly thereafter.

== Personal life and death ==
He was married, at Newtown, on September 2, 1798, to Mary ("Polly"), eldest daughter of Dr. Bennett and Sarah (Beers) Perry, by whom he had three sons and one daughter. The eldest son, Charles Chapman, was a distinguished lawyer in Hartford, and served in the United States Congress.

He became ill with consumption, and after two journeys in search of health, he died in New Haven at the age of 55. Many of his manuscript letters addressed to Judge David Daggett are preserved in the Yale Library.

Mary Chapman died in Brooklyn, New York, at the residence of one of her sons, on March 24, 1850, in her 70th year.

A miniature portrait of Chapman, painted in watercolor on ivory and dated 1824, is held by the Litchfield Historical Society. It is attributed to Anthony or Nina Meucci.

Political offices
Preceded by Simeon Baldwin	Justice of the Connecticut Supreme Court; 1818–1825	Succeeded by James Lanman
