= Justice Haines =

Justice Haines may refer to:

- Daniel Haines (1801–1877), associate justice of the New Jersey Supreme Court
- Frank D. Haines (1866–1959), associate justice of the Connecticut Supreme Court

== See also ==
- Judge Haines (disambiguation)
