= Litchfield Law School =

- Tapping Reeve House and Law School
- U.S. National Register of Historic Places
- U.S. National Historic Landmark
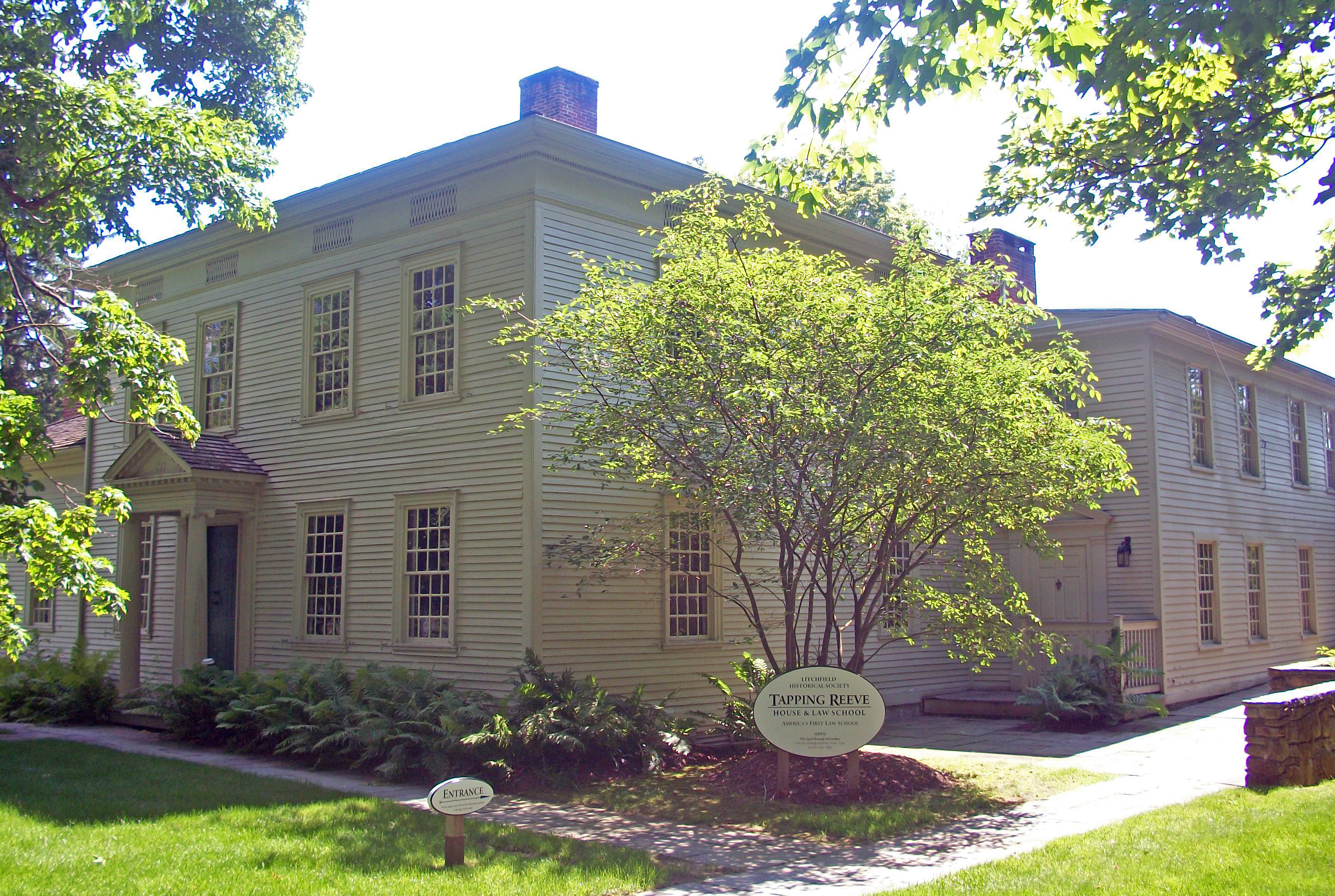
- East elevation and north profile of Tapping Reeve House, 2010

- Location within Connecticut Location within the United States
- Location: Litchfield, CT
- Coordinates: 41°44′38″N 73°11′19″W
- Built: 1784
- NRHP reference No.: 66000879

Significant dates
- Added to NRHP: October 15, 1966
- Designated NHL: December 21, 1965

The Litchfield Law School was a law school in Litchfield, Connecticut, that operated from 1774 to 1833. Litchfield was the first independent law school established in America for reading law. Founded and led by lawyer Tapping Reeve, the proprietary school was unaffiliated with any college or university. While Litchfield was independent, a long-term debate resulted in the 1966 recognition of William & Mary Law School as the first law school to have been affiliated with a university.

Reeve began teaching his first student in 1774, and by 1784 was teaching by lecture. He later became the Chief Justice of the Connecticut Supreme Court. The school closed in 1833, having educated over 1,100 students, including Aaron Burr and John C. Calhoun. The law school, including Reeve's house, was declared a National Historic Landmark in 1965 as the Tapping Reeve House and Law School, which is owned and operated by the Litchfield Historical Society as a museum displaying life in a 19th-century period school. The Society also operates the Litchfield History Museum.

== Tapping Reeve ==
Reeve was born on Long Island, New York, in 1744. He graduated from the College of New Jersey (later Princeton University) in 1763, serving for seven years as a tutor at the Grammar School connected with the college. There he met the children of Aaron Burr Sr.—Aaron Burr (later Vice President of the United States) and Sally Burr, who were both his students.

Tapping Reeve moved to Connecticut, studied law under Judge Jesse Root of Hartford, and was admitted to the bar in 1772. In the same year, he married Sally Burr. They then moved to Litchfield and Reeve started his own law practice. Tapping Reeve built his six-room Litchfield house in 1773 and settled in with his wife. In 1780 he added a downstairs wing for Sally, who found it difficult to climb stairs.

== Law school ==
Judge Gould's Law School Building, from a 1920 image

In addition to practicing law, Reeve trained many prospective attorneys, including Aaron Burr, his brother in law. Students lived in the homes of town residents and traveled to Reeve's house on South Street to receive their morning lectures on the common law in Reeve's downstairs parlor. In 1784, in response to increasing demand, Reeve had a one-room school built adjacent to his house. James Gould became Reeve's associate when Reeve was elected to the Connecticut Supreme Court in 1798. Reeve withdrew in 1820 and Gould continued until 1833. The school's lectures covered the entire body of the law including real estate, rights of persons, rights of things, contracts, torts, evidence, pleading, crimes, and equity.

== Notable alumni ==
The list of students who attended Tapping Reeve's law school includes two Vice Presidents of the United States (Aaron Burr and John C. Calhoun), 101 members of the United States House of Representatives, 28 United States senators, six United States cabinet secretaries, three justices of the United States Supreme Court, 14 state governors and 13 state supreme court chief justices. Litchfield Law School students also held state and local political office and became business leaders. Students went on to found university law schools and become university presidents. Framed pictures of students are still hung in the school, including George Catlin, Horace Mann (the educator), Aaron Burr, Oliver Wolcott Jr., and Roger Sherman Baldwin. Each name is followed by the year that the student finished, when known.

- John Allen, 1784
- Ezekiel Bacon, 1794
- William J. Bacon, 1823
- Joshua Baker, 1821, Governor of Louisiana
- Henry Baldwin, 1797, Associate Justice of the U. S. Supreme Court
- Roger Sherman Baldwin, 1812, son of Simeon Baldwin and the grandson of Roger Sherman
- James Bell, 1824
- Edmund H. Bennett
- Aaron Burr, 1774, U.S. Vice President, U.S. Senator
- Chester Pierce Butler, 1818
- John Caldwell Calhoun, 1805, U.S. Vice-President, U.S. Senator, Secretary of State, Secretary of War
- George Catlin, 1817
- Charles Clarke Chapman, U.S. Representative for Connecticut
- John M. Clayton, 1817, U. S. Senator and Secretary of State
- George W. Clinton, 1828, Mayor of Buffalo, New York , son of DeWitt Clinton
- John A. Collier, 1805
- Joel Crawford, 1806
- William Crosby Dawson, 1817
- Thomas Day, 1797
- John Stark Edwards, 1796
- Amos Ellmaker, 1806, Attorney General of Pennsylvania
- Henry Leavitt Ellsworth, 1811
- John Myers Felder, 1806
- Thomas Flournoy Foster, 1816
- Samuel A. Foot, 1797, Connecticut Governor, U.S. Representative and Senator
- John Brown Francis, 1813, U.S. Senator from Rhode Island 1844-45, Governor of Rhode Island 1833-38
- Albert C. Greene, 1812–1813, United States Senator and Attorney General of Rhode Island
- Hopkins Holsey
- Ward Hunt, 1830, Associate Justice of the Supreme Court of the United States
- James G. King (1791–1853), businessman and politician who represented New Jersey's 5th congressional district from 1849 to 1851.
- Lucius Quintus Cincinnatus Lamar (I), 1817
- Charles Greely Loring, c. 1815, Boston-based lawyer
- Horace Mann, 1822, U.S. Representative
- Theron Metcalf, 1806, Associate Justice of the Massachusetts Supreme Judicial Court
- Rutger B. Miller, 1824
- Eugenius Aristides Nisbet, 1823
- Elisha Phelps, 1801
- John Pierpoint, 1826, Chief Justice of the Vermont Supreme Court
- John Pierpont, poet and pastor of the Hollis Street Church in Boston
- Horatio Seymour, 1798
- Roger Minott Sherman, 1794, son of Rev. Josiah Sherman, the brother of Roger Sherman
- Richard Skinner, 1798
- Perry Smith, 1807, U. S. Senator
- Truman Smith, 1817, U. S. Senator
- Benjamin Swift, 1801, U.S Representative, U.S. Senator
- Frederick A. Tallmadge, 1811
- Uriah Tracy, 1778, U.S. Senator, U.S. Representative
- Bates Turner, 1780, Associate Justice of the Vermont Supreme Court
- Stephen Upson, 1805
- Nicholas Ware, 1792
- Lemuel Whitman, 1805
- Elisha Dana Whittlesey, 1813
- Frederick Whittlesey, 1819
- Thomas T. Whittlesey, 1818
- Oliver Wolcott Jr., 1778, Secretary of the Treasury, U.S. Circuit Court Judge, and Governor of Connecticut
- William Woodbridge, 1802, US senator, Michigan governor
- Levi Woodbury, 1809, U. S. Supreme Court Justice, Senator, Secretary of the Treasury and Navy, and Governor of New Hampshire
- Augustus Romaldus Wright, 1833

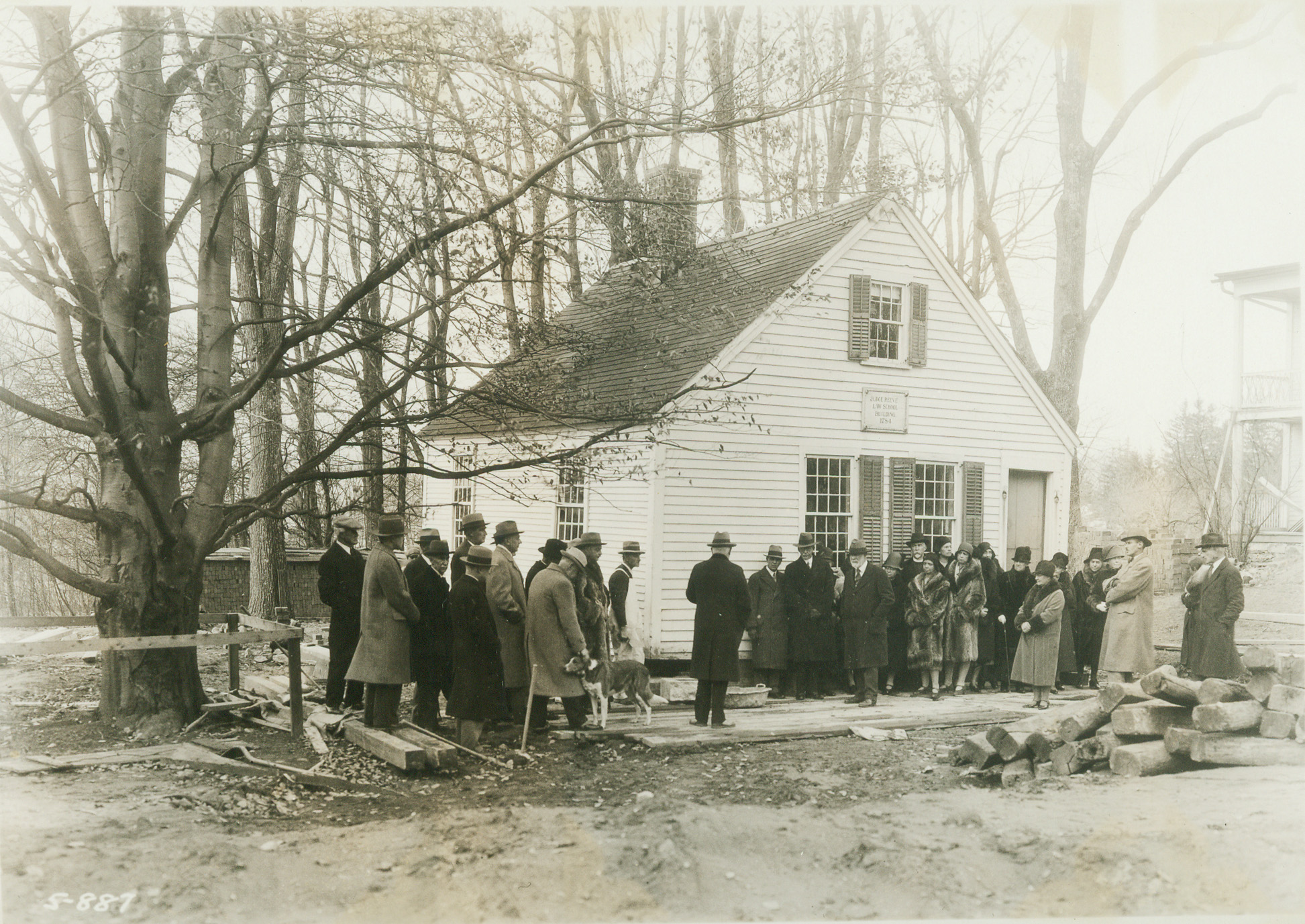
(1929)

== See also ==
- List of defunct law schools in the United States
- List of National Historic Landmarks in Connecticut
- National Register of Historic Places listings in Litchfield County, Connecticut
