= Roger Wolcott =

Roger Wolcott is the name of:

- Roger Wolcott (Connecticut politician) (1679–1767), Colonial Governor of Connecticut
- Roger Wolcott (Massachusetts politician) (1847–1900), Governor of Massachusetts 1896–1900
