= Justice Banks =

Justice Banks may refer to:

- Fred L. Banks Jr. (born 1942), associate justice of the Supreme Court of Mississippi
- John W. Banks (1867–1958), associate justice of the Connecticut Supreme Court
