= Roger Sherman (disambiguation) =

Roger Sherman (1721–1793) was an American lawyer, politician, and Founding Father.

Roger Sherman may also refer to:

- Roger Sherman (American football) (1872–1957)
- Roger Sherman (Maine politician) (1940–2024)
- Roger Minott Sherman (1773–1844), judge
- Roger Sherman (filmmaker) (born 1951)
