= Francis M. McDonald =

American jurist

Chief Justice of the Connecticut Supreme Court
- In office September 1999 – January 2001
- Preceded by: Robert J. Callahan
- Succeeded by: William Sullivan

Associate Justice of the Connecticut Supreme Court
- In office 1996–1999
- Appointed by: John G. Rowland

Personal details
- Born: 1931 Waterbury, Connecticut, U.S.
- Died: October 8, 2018 (aged 87) Waterbury, Connecticut, U.S.
- Education: College of the Holy Cross (BA); Yale University (LLB)

Francis M. McDonald (1931 – October 8, 2018) was an American jurist who served as the chief justice of the Connecticut Supreme Court from 1999 to 2001. Previously, he served as a state trial judge.

== Early life and education ==
McDonald was born one of eight children to Francis, an attorney, and Margaret Kelly McDonald. Among his siblings were a teacher, lawyers, an entomologist, and multiple specialists in information technology. As a student at Crosby High School, McDonald met Mary Kelly, who he later married in January 1956.

McDonald attended the College of the Holy Cross, where his father and younger brother also had attended. He graduated from Holy Cross with a Bachelor of Arts, magna cum laude, in 1953. He then attended Yale Law School, where he earned his Bachelor of Laws (LL.B.) in 1956. On his wedding day that same year, he gained admission to the Connecticut Bar Association.

== Early career ==
McDonald was a special agent for the FBI from 1957 to 1958. He then was a federal prosecutor in Connecticut from 1958 to 1960.

== Federal juridical service ==
Governor William A. O'Neill appointed McDonald to the Connecticut Superior Court in 1984, and McDonald remained there until 1996, when Governor John G. Rowland appointed him as an associate justice of the Connecticut Supreme Court. In October 1999, McDonald was sworn in as chief justice and later retired in January 2001. He replaced Robert J. Callahan as chief justice.

Although generally conservative, McDonald sided often with liberal justice Robert Berdon. He became known as a judicial libertarian who frequently dissented from the Court's majority. He was succeeded as chief justice by Associate Justice William Sullivan.

McDonald died in Waterbury, Connecticut, on October 8, 2018, from pneumonia complications. He was 87 years old.
