= 19th Regiment of Connecticut Militia =

19th Connecticut Regiment
- Active: 1775-1783
- Allegiance: Connecticut Colony 1774-1776; State of Connecticut 1776-1783
- Branch: Infantry
- Type: Militia (United States)
- Size: Authorized 11 companies
- Part of: Connecticut Militia
- Engagements: Siege of Boston January 1776- February 1776

Commanders
- Notable commanders: Colonel Erastus Wolcott; Colonel Nathaniel Terry

The 19th Connecticut Regiment was a military regiment in the American Revolutionary War. It was formed in 1774 by an act of the Connecticut General Assembly and was authorized 11 companies of volunteers from Enfield, East Windsor, Bolton, and the part of Hartford on the East side of the Connecticut river of Hartford County, Connecticut. The rolls of eight of those companies survive. While General George Washington was reorganizing the Continental Army from December 1775 through February 1776, during the Siege of Boston, Connecticut sent three regiments under Colonels James Wadsworth (10th Connecticut Regiment), Erastus Wolcott (19th Connecticut Regiment), and John Douglass (21st Connecticut Regiment). These regiments reached Boston in late January 1776 and remained for approximately six weeks.

Colonel Erastus Wolcott of Windsor commanded the 19th Connecticut Regiment from October 1774 - May 1777. Colonel Nathaniel Terry of Enfield commanded the regiment from May 1777 - 1783.

== See also ==
- 1st Brigade, Connecticut Militia
- 10th Connecticut Regiment
- 21st Connecticut Regiment
- Nathaniel Terry Sr
