= Louis Shapiro (judge) =

American judge (1905–1991)

- Shapiro c. 1946

Member of the Connecticut House of Representatives from Farmington
- In office 1941–1953
- Preceded by: Gertrude D. Smith; Robert E. Parsons
- Succeeded by: Robert K. Vibert; W. Sheffield Cowles

Personal details
- Born: February 7, 1905 New York City, U.S.
- Died: February 8, 1991 (aged 86) Hartford, Connecticut, U.S.
- Party: Republican

Louis Shapiro (February 7, 1905 – February 8, 1991) was a justice of the Connecticut Supreme Court from 1970 to 1975.

Born in New York City, Shapiro graduated from Hartford Public High School in 1923 and from Hartford College of Law (later the University of Connecticut School of Law) in 1933, gaining admission to the Connecticut Bar in 1934. He was in private practice from 1934 to 1939, when he became a borough court judge. He served in the Connecticut House of Representatives from 1941 to 1953, chairing the judiciary committee from 1947 to 1950 and serving as majority leader from 1950 to 1953, when Governor John Davis Lodge named Shapiro to the Superior Court. From 1966 to 1970, he was chief judge of that court. Governor John N. Dempsey then appointed Shapiro to the state supreme court, where he remained until reaching the mandatory retirement age of 70 in 1975. Shapiro was succeeded by Justice Joseph S. Longo.

Shapiro died at Hartford Hospital at the age of 86.

Political offices
Preceded by John Hamilton King	Justice of the Connecticut Supreme Court; 1970–1975	Succeeded by Joseph S. Longo
