= C. Ian McLachlan =

American judge

C. Ian McLachlan (born June 2, 1942) is a former justice of the Connecticut Supreme Court, having been appointed in 2009 by Governor Jodi Rell. He retired June 12, 2012.

== Early life, education and career ==
Born in Norwalk, Connecticut, McLachlan received a degree in Finance from Georgetown University in 1964, followed by a J.D. from Fordham University School of Law in 1967. He served stateside in the United States Marine Corps Reserve during the Vietnam War, from 1967 to 1973, attending the Defense Language Institute in Monterey, California.

McLachlan then joined the Stamford office of Cummings & Lockwood and was an associate and partner of Cummings & Lockwood in various offices in Connecticut from 1969 until his appointment to the Superior Court in 1996, except from 1979 to 1983 when he was a principal in the Westport law firm of Berkowitz, Balbirer & McLachlan.

== Judicial service ==
McLachlan served on the Superior Court from 1996 until 2003, when he was elevated to the Appellate Court. In February 2009, Governor Jodi Rell elevated McLachlan to the Connecticut Supreme Court, where he remained until his retirement in 2012, upon reaching the state's mandatory retirement age.

After retiring from the court, McLachlan entered private practice.

== Significant Supreme Court Cases ==
- Town of Branford v. New England Estates LLC. v. Branford Township
- Raftopol v. Ramey
- Bedrick v. Bedrick
- Berzins v. Berzins

Political offices
Preceded by Barry R. Schaller	Justice of the Connecticut Supreme Court; 2009–2012	Succeeded by Carmen E. Espinosa
