= William Hillhouse (judge) =

American judge (1728–1816)

William Hillhouse (or Hilhouse; August 25, 1728 – January 12, 1816) was an associate justice of the Connecticut Supreme Court of Errors (predecessor to the Connecticut Supreme Court) from 1785 to 1807.

Hillhouse was elected as a delegate to the Continental Congress in 1783 and 1785, but did not participate in either session.

Hillhouse was considered to be among the more distinguished members of the Connecticut Supreme Court of Errors.

Hillhouse was born in Montville, Connecticut August 25, 1728. He studied law and was admitted to the bar. He served in the Connecticut House of Representatives from 1756 to 1760 and from 1763 to 1785. He was a major in the Second Regiment of the Connecticut Cavalry during the Revolutionary War. He was elected to the Continental Congress in 1783 and 1785, but did not attend. He was a judge of the court of common pleas from 1784-1806. He served as a member of the Connecticut Senate from 1785 to 1808. He was a probate judge in the New London district from 1786 to 1807; died in Montville, Connecticut. Hillhouse died January 12, 1816; and was interred in the Raymond Hill Cemetery.

Political offices
Preceded by Newly constituted court.	Justice of the Connecticut Supreme Court; 1785–1807	Succeeded by Court reconstituted.
