= Jonathan O. Moseley =

American politician

Jonathan Ogden Moseley

Personal details
- Born: April 9, 1762 East Haddam, Connecticut
- Died: September 9, 1838 Saginaw, Michigan, U.S.

Jonathan Ogden Moseley (April 9, 1762 – September 9, 1838) was a member of the U.S. House of Representatives from Connecticut. He was born in East Haddam, Connecticut, the only child of Thomas Moseley, a physician, and Phebe Ogden. He graduated from Yale College in 1780, studied law, was admitted to the bar and began practice in East Haddam.

Moseley was a member of the State house of representatives from 1794 to 1804 and served as justice of the peace of East Haddam from 1794 to 1817. He also served as state's attorney of Middlesex County from 1801 to 1805, and was colonel of the Twenty-fourth Regiment of the Connecticut Militia in 1802.

He was elected as a Federalist to the Ninth and to the seven succeeding Congresses (March 4, 1805 – March 3, 1821). After leaving Congress he moved to Saginaw, Michigan, and continued the practice of law until his death in 1838.

U.S. House of Representatives
Preceded by Simeon Baldwin	Member of the U.S. House of Representatives from Connecticut's at-large congressional district 1805-1821	Succeeded by Ansel Sterling
