= Herbert S. MacDonald =

American judge (1907–1998)

Associate Justice of the Connecticut Supreme Court
- In office 1972–1977

Personal details
- Born: January 14, 1903 Uniontown, Pennsylvania, U.S.
- Died: January 15, 1998 (aged 95) North Branford, Connecticut, U.S.
- Education: Yale College; Harvard Law School
- Occupation: jurist

Herbert S. MacDonald (January 14, 1907 – January 15, 1998) was a justice of the Connecticut Supreme Court from 1972 to 1975. He also served as a one term member of the Connecticut State Senate from 1946 to 1948.

Born in Uniontown, Pennsylvania, he was 1929 graduate of Yale College and received his law degree from Harvard Law School in 1932.

MacDonald was elected to the court in 1946, receiving roughly two thirds of the popular vote. He retired from full service on the court on January 14, 1972. He died at a hospital in North Branford, Connecticut, at the age of 91.

Political offices
Preceded by John R. Thim	Justice of the Connecticut Supreme Court; 1972–1977	Succeeded by William P. Barber
