= Judge Haynes =

Judge Haynes may refer to:

- Catharina Haynes (born 1963), judge of the United States Court of Appeals for the Fifth Circuit
- William Joseph Haynes Jr. (born 1949), judge of the United States District Court for the Middle District of Tennessee

== See also ==
- Judge Haines (disambiguation)
