= Angelo G. Santaniello =

American judge (1924–2015)

Angelo G. Santaniello (May 28, 1924 – March 1, 2015) was a justice of the Connecticut Supreme Court from 1985 to 1987.

== Early life, education, and military service ==
Born in New London, Connecticut, Santaniello graduated from the Bulkeley School in 1942 and served in the United States Navy during World War II. He received his undergraduate degree from the College of the Holy Cross in 1946, and "embarked on what he thought would be a career as a math teacher", but with his father's encouragement he then chose to pursue a career in law, receiving his law degree from the Georgetown University Law Center in 1950.

== Legal career ==
He entered the private practice of law, first as a solo practitioner, and this in partnership with C. Robert Satti. Entering public service, he served as an assistant prosecuting attorney in the New London Police Court for four years, and was then appointed Circuit Court judge in 1966, and judge of Common Pleas in 1971. In 1973, he was elevated to a seat as a Superior Court Judge, and in 1985, Governor William A. O'Neill elevated Santaniello to a seat on the state supreme court. Santaniello served until he reached the mandatory retirement age of 70 in 1994, after which he served as a State Trial Judge Referee until his retirement in 2010.

== Personal life and death ==
Santaniello was married twice, first to Catherine Driscoll, who predeceased him, and then to Kay Cooper. He had two daughters and a son. Santaniello died at his home in Pawcatuck, Connecticut, at the age of 90.

Political offices
Preceded by Anthony E. Grillo	Justice of the Connecticut Supreme Court; 1985–1987	Succeeded by Alfred V. Covello
