= Elisha Carpenter =

American judge (1824–1897)

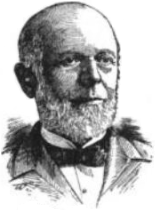

Justice of the Connecticut Supreme Court
- In office 1866–1894

Member of the Connecticut House of Representatives
- In office 1861

Member of the Connecticut Senate
- In office 1857–1858

Personal details
- Born: January 14, 1824 Ashford, Connecticut
- Died: March 22, 1897 (aged 73) Hartford, Connecticut
- Spouses: Harriet G. Brown (m. 1854; died 1874) Sophia Tyler Cowen (m. 1876)
- Occupation: Jurist, politician

Elisha Carpenter (January 14, 1824 – March 22, 1897) was a Connecticut attorney and politician who served as a justice of the Connecticut Supreme Court from 1866 to 1894.

== Early life, education, and career ==
Born in Ashford (in the portion which later became Eastford, Windham County, Connecticut), to Uriah B. Carpenter and Marcia Carpenter (née Scarborough), Carpenter's father was a farmer in moderate circumstances, but was much respected in the community, and entrusted with its most important public offices. Carpenter was his fourth son. He was brought up on his father's farm and divided his time between farm labor and study.

He was educated, by his own efforts, in the public schools and at the Ellington Academy. At the age of seventeen he became a school teacher, and continued to teach school at intervals for seven years. He intended to go to college, but after circumstances prevented that from happening, he undertook to read law, first with Frederick Hovey for short time at Eastford, and then in 1844 in the office of Jonathan A. Welch of Brooklyn, Connecticut. In 1846 was admitted to the bar in Windham County, Connecticut.

== Legal and political career ==
In March 1851, he moved to Danielsonville (now Danielson, Connecticut) in the same county. In that year he was appointed state's attorney for Windham County, and held the office for one year, and by a later appointment from 1854 until 1861. In 1857 and 1858 he represented the fourteenth district in the Connecticut Senate, serving as President pro tempore of the Connecticut Senate. At the opening of the Civil War in 1861 he was a member of the Connecticut House of Representatives, and as chairman of the Committee on Military Affairs, he "rendered valuable service to the Union cause".

== Judicial career ==
In 1861, the legislature elected Carpenter a judge of the Superior Court, to succeed Judge Butler who was promoted to the Supreme Court. Soon after this appointment, Carpenter moved to Wethersfield, Connecticut. In 1865 he was elected to the Supreme Court, to fill the vacancy created by the retirement of Henry Dutton, taking his seat in February 1866.

Carpenter's career on the Supreme Court was identified in an unusual manner with public interests. He wrote a noted opinion in case on boycotts, which "defined the rights of the workingman so clearly that there has been no controversy with regard to the matter since". The opinion of the court relative to the forfeiture of wages in case of a violation of contract, was also prepared by him. He was also prominent in secret ballot and quo warranto decisions, and in those in support of the property rights of married women.

Carpenter was re-elected to the Supreme Court judgeship for three successive terms of eight years each, including the fraction of a term preceding his retirement under the constitutional limitation as to age. In April 1889, when Chief Justice Park retired, it was widely expected that Carpenter, being the senior judge then serving, would be made chief justice. However, Governor Bulkeley instead tendered the nomination to two other leading lawyers, not on the court, both of whom declined it. Bulkeley then offered it to Superior Court judge Charles B. Andrews, who accepted it "only when it became certain that it would not be given to Judge Carpenter". Although Bulkeley renominated Carpenter for continued service as an associate justice, Carpenter "felt what he regarded as the injustice done him very keenly and never got over it". Carpenter reached the mandatory retirement age one month short of twenty-eight years of continuous service upon that court, making over thirty-two years of judicial life. For twenty-three years previous to 1889 he was the youngest man on the court. He was also a member of the state board of education from its organization in 1865 to 1883. For several years he served on the state board of pardons. On his retirement as judge he was appointed a state referee by the legislature, with a salary for life of $2,000 a year. Upon leaving the bench he resumed the practice of law, and entered into partnership with Frank B. Williams, in Hartford.

== Personal life ==
In 1854, Carpenter married Harriet G. Brown. She died in 1874, leaving three daughters and one son. The son died in 1879 at age eighteen.

Carpenter remarried to Sophia Tyler Cowen in 1876, and they had two children.

Throughout his life, Carpenter was an active church member in the Congregational denomination, a teacher in its Sabbath schools, and for many years a deacon in the Asylum Hill Congregational Church. During his long tenure on the Supreme Court, Carpenter moved to Hartford, Connecticut, where he remained for over twenty years.

Sometime around 1882, Carpenter suffered a shock of paralysis which left him with a permanent lameness, but from which he wholly recovered in all other respects. In January 1895, he slipped upon the ice and broke his hip, and had another fall in his room after he had begun to recover. He lived for two years after that, although he continued to suffer the effects of these injuries until his death on March 22, 1897. Carpenter's daughters survived him.

Political offices
Preceded by Henry Dutton	Justice of the Connecticut Supreme Court; 1866–1894	Succeeded by William Hamersley
