= John M. Comley =

American judge (1895–1974)

John Munson Comley (July 1, 1895 – December 14, 1974) was a justice of the Connecticut Supreme Court from 1963 to 1965.

Born in Bridgeport, Connecticut, Comley attended the public schools of his home town and received an undergraduate degree from Yale University in 1917. He served in the quartermaster corps during World War I, attaining the rank of sergeant. He thereafter received a law degree from Yale Law School in 1920, where he served on the editorial board of the Yale Law Journal. He entered into the private practice of law, moving to Stamford, Connecticut, in 1929, and becoming a Superior Court judge for Fairfield County, Connecticut, in 1945. From 1924 to 1929, Comley served as the Connecticut Supreme Court the reporter of judicial decisions, at the behest of chief justice George W. Wheeler.

Comley was appointed to the state supreme court on August 31, 1963, serving until he reached the mandatory retirement age of seventy on July 1, 1965.

Comley married Grace Aufford of Stratford in 1925, with whom he had a son and a daughter; Grace died in 1933, and Comley later remarried to Frances Bruggerhoff. Comley died in a convalescent home in Stamford at the age of 79.

Political offices
Preceded by Raymond E. Baldwin	Justice of the Connecticut Supreme Court; 1963–1965	Succeeded by Charles S. House
