= Judge Haines =

Judge Haines may refer to:

- Harry Haines (judge) (born 1939), judge of the United States Tax Court
- Stephanie L. Haines (born 1969), judge of the United States District Court for the Western District of Pennsylvania

== See also ==
- Justice Haines (disambiguation)
- Judge Haynes (disambiguation)
