= Joseph S. Longo =

American politician and judge (1914–1993)

Member of the Connecticut House of Representatives from Norwich
- In office 1949–1951 Serving with Napoleon Pepin
- Preceded by: Rene L. Dugas; William Gromko
- Succeeded by: Anthony G. Kirker; Napoleon Pepin

Member of the Connecticut Senate from the 19th district
- In office 1951–1957
- Preceded by: Nicholas J. Spellman
- Succeeded by: Joseph H. Goldberg

Personal details
- Born: September 22, 1914 Norwich, Connecticut, U.S.
- Died: November 29, 1993 (aged 79)
- Party: Democratic

Military service
- Branch/service: United States Navy

Joseph S. Longo (September 22, 1914 – November 29, 1993) was an American politician and judge from Connecticut. A Democrat, from 1949 to 1951, he served in the Connecticut House of Representatives, and from 1951 to 1957, in the Connecticut State Senate. Longo was a justice of the Connecticut Supreme Court from 1975 to 1979.

== Personal life ==
Born in Norwich, Connecticut, Longo "graduated from Norwich Free Academy and then Yale University with a B.A. degree in 1936. He enrolled at the Boston University School of Law, where he received his law degree in 1939. He was admitted to the Connecticut bar that same year". Longo served in the United States Navy during World War II.

== Political career ==
In the late 1940s, Longo entered politics, serving one term in the Connecticut House of Representatives and three terms in the Connecticut State Senate, including a term as majority leader in the 1955 session. From 1957 to 1959, he served on the state's Common Pleas Court, and from 1959 to 1975 he served on the Superior Court. He was appointed to the state supreme court in 1975 following the retirement of Justice Louis Shapiro, and stepped down from the court in 1979.

Political offices
Preceded by Louis Shapiro	Justice of the Connecticut Supreme Court; 1975–1979	Succeeded by Arthur H. Healey
