= Elmer Watson =

American politician (1908–1971)

Elmer S. Watson
- Watson c. 1957

Majority Leader of the Connecticut State Senate
- In office 1957–1959

Member of the Connecticut Senate from the 4th district
- In office 1951–1959
- Preceded by: Charles S. House
- Succeeded by: Fred J. Doocy

Personal details
- Born: Elmer Stiles Watson; June 19, 1908 Hartford, Connecticut, U.S.
- Died: November 24, 1971 (aged 63) Wethersfield, Connecticut, U.S.
- Education: University of Connecticut (BS)

Military service
- Allegiance: United States
- Branch/service: US Army, National Guard
- Years of service: 1930–1951
- Rank: Major general
- Unit: 43rd Infantry Division
- Commands: Connecticut State Guard
- Battles/wars: Battle of Munda Point

Elmer Stiles Watson (June 19, 1908 – November 24, 1971) was an American military officer and politician who served as majority leader of the Connecticut State Senate from 1957 to 1959. Following graduation from high school, he took a job at his brother's insurance agency. He also joined the Connecticut National Guard and served with the United States Army in World War II. He remained with the Connecticut National Guard after the war and served as its commanding officer from 1949 to 1951.

A Republican, Watson served as commissioner of the Connecticut Department of Motor Vehicles from 1947 to 1949. He subsequently served four terms in the Connecticut State Senate representing the 4th District from 1951 to 1959, acting as the Republican majority leader his last term. He acted as a member of the board of trustees of the University of Connecticut in his later life and died in 1971.

== Early life and education ==
Watson was born in Hartford, Connecticut, on June 19, 1908, to parents George I. and Mabel (Avery) Watson. He graduated from Weaver High School in 1925 and earned his Bachelor of Science degree from Connecticut Agricultural College in 1929. He played baseball, reported for The Daily Campus, served on the rifle team for four years and as team captain for two years, and commanded his ROTC battalion during his senior year.

Immediately after graduation, Watson joined the Hartford-based Arthur A. Watson and Company insurance agency, founded in 1929 by his brother Arthur A. Watson. Elmer Watson eventually rose to senior partner.

== Military service ==
Watson enlisted in the Connecticut National Guard as a second lieutenant in 1930. During World War II, he served with the United States Army's 43rd Infantry Division as a lieutenant colonel and operations officer on the division general staff. Shot in both legs when Japanese warplanes machine-gunned his position at Munda in 1943, he received the Legion of Merit, a Purple Heart, the Army Commendation Medal, the Asiatic–Pacific Campaign Medal with two battle stars and one bronze arrowhead, the American Campaign Medal, and the American Defense Medal. After recuperating, he taught at the Army and Navy Staff College and retired in 1945 as a full colonel.

Exiting the US Army, Watson remained in the National Guard. He attained the rank of brigadier general and commanded the Connecticut State Guard from 1949 to 1951. He retired as a major general.

== Political career ==
Governor Raymond E. Baldwin appointed Watson, a fellow Republican, as commissioner of the Connecticut Department of Motor Vehicles in 1945. However, the Democratic-controlled state senate refused to confirm Watson until January 1947. Watson served to 1949, introducing a point system and other reforms. In 1948, he was vice president of the Eastern Conference of the American Association of Motor Vehicle Administrators.

From 1951 to 1959, Watson served four terms in the Connecticut State Senate representing the 4th District, centered on Wethersfield. He served as senate majority leader from 1957 to 1959.

Elected by the alumni, Watson served on the board of trustees of the University of Connecticut from 1945 to 1965. He had purchased the first Husky Mascot, Jonathan I, in 1935 with his own money and offered to pay for the purchase of a new husky after Jonathan IV died unexpectedly in 1958. With Willard H. Allen, Watson received UConn's inaugural Distinguished Alumni Award in 1956. Opened in 1966, Watson Residence Hall was named in his honor.

== Personal life ==
Watson married Cornelia Williamson at Dobbs Ferry, New York, on September 21, 1935. The couple had two children: Charles Stiles and Margaret Torrey. He was president of the Automobile Club of Hartford for 16 years. He was active in the Rotary Club and other local civic organizations. He died at his Wethersfield home on November 24, 1971, at the age of 63.
