= Arthur H. Healey =

American judge (c. 1920–2003)

Arthur H. Healey (May 5, 1920 – July 25, 2003) was a justice of the Connecticut Supreme Court from 1979 to 1990.

He was born in New Haven, Connecticut, and attended New Haven High School and earned degrees at Trinity College and Harvard Law School and served in the United States Army during World War II.

He served in the Connecticut State Senate representing the 10th district from 1954 to 1960 as a Democrat.

Healey later became a Connecticut Superior Court judge, and in a 1977 evaluation of judges on that court he received only an average rating. Despite this, in 1978, Healey was expected to be nominated for a vacancy on the state supreme court due to his seniority, but was passed over in favor of Ellen Ash Peters, the first woman justice to be appointed. However, in May 1979, Governor Ella Grasso nominated Healey to another vacancy on the state supreme court.

Political offices
Preceded by Joseph S. Longo	Justice of the Connecticut Supreme Court; 1979–1990	Succeeded by David M. Borden
