= Newell Jennings =

American judge (1883–1965)

Newell Jennings (May 12, 1883 – February 17, 1965) was a justice of the Connecticut Supreme Court from 1937 to 1953.

Born in Bristol, Connecticut, to John J. and Elizabeth (Newell) Jennings, he attended the public schools in Bristol, "interrupted by two years of study abroad, one in Hanover, Germany, and one in Paris, France". He received his BA from Yale University in 1904, Phi Beta Kappa, and an LL.B. from Yale Law School in 1907, cum laude.

In 1922, Governor Everett J. Lake appointed Jennings to a seat on the State Superior Court, where Jennings was most noted for presiding over the murder trial of notorious criminal Gerald Chapman. Chapman was convicted by the jury, and Jennings sentenced Chapman to death by hanging, despite threats from Chapman's confederates. In 1937, Jennings was elevated by Governor Wilbur Lucius Cross to a seat on the Connecticut Supreme Court. By the time of his resignation in 1953, after 31 years of combined judicial service, Jennings had been nicknamed "Iron Man".

Jennings died in Bristol Hospital following a long illness.

Political offices
Preceded by John W. Banks	Justice of the Connecticut Supreme Court; 1937–1953	Succeeded by John A. Cornell
