= Leo Parskey =

American judge (1915–1994)

Associate Justice of the Connecticut Supreme Court
- In office July 4, 1980 – June 22, 1985
- Governor: Ella Grasso; William A. O'Neill

Personal details
- Born: June 22, 1915 Hartford, Connecticut, United States of America
- Died: February 5, 1994 (age 78)
- Education: Harvard College (A.B.); Harvard Law School (JD)

Military service
- Allegiance: United States of America
- Branch/service: US Army
- Years of service: 1940-1946
- Rank: Captain

Leo Parskey (June 22, 1915 – February 5, 1994) was an American lawyer and jurist who served as Justice of the Connecticut Supreme Court from 1980 to 1985.

== Early life and military service ==
Parskey was born in Hartford, Connecticut, on June 22, 1915. Parskey received an A.B. degree from Harvard College in 1937, and a J.D. degree from Harvard Law School in 1940. He became a member of the Connecticut Bar Association in 1940.

After graduation, Parskey immediately joined the United States Army Air Corps, serving throughout World War II, and achieving the rank of captain by his discharge in 1946. He later became a member of the American Veterans Committee.

== Career ==
Parskey ran for and served on the Hartford City Council in the 1950s; during this time, he was also deputy mayor. Parskey also served as the president of the Hartford chapter of the American Jewish Congress.

In 1965, Parskey became a judge of the Connecticut Superior Court. On April 22, 1980, Governor Ella Grasso nominated him to become an associate justice on the Connecticut Supreme Court; he served until the constitutional limit on the age of justices in Connecticut of 70 years old, in 1985.

== Later life and death ==
Parskey died on February 5, 1994, at the age of 78.

Daughter Leslie Parskey, Peggy Parskey, Son Joe Parskey

Grandson Brian Katz

Political offices
Preceded by Alva Loiselle	Justice of the Connecticut Supreme Court; 1980–1985	Succeeded by Robert J. Callahan
