= Attorney General Wolcott =

Attorney General Wolcott may refer to:

- Christopher Wolcott (1820–1863), Attorney General of Ohio
- Josiah O. Wolcott (1877–1938), Attorney General of Delaware

== See also ==
- General Wolcott (disambiguation)
