= Ernest A. Inglis =

American judge

Chief Justice of the Connecticut Supreme Court
- In office 1953–1957

Justice of the Connecticut Supreme Court
- In office 1950–1953

Personal details
- Born: April 16, 1887 Middletown, Connecticut
- Died: December 9, 1972 (aged 85) Middletown, Connecticut
- Education: Wesleyan University; Yale Law School

Ernest Alexander Inglis (April 16, 1887 in Middletown, Connecticut – December 9, 1972 in Middletown) was a lawyer, judge, and chief justice of the Connecticut Supreme Court.

Inglis attended Wesleyan University graduating in 1908. He achieved an excellent scholarship record, graduating Phi Beta Kappa. He was a 1911 graduate of Yale Law School, having been a member of the Yale Law Journal, and was admitted to the bar in Middlesex County in the same year. He formed a practice in Middletown with Frank D. Haines, later an associate justice of the Connecticut Supreme Court.

Subsequently, he was appointed as state's attorney for Middlesex County. In 1930 he was appointed to the Superior Court.

In 1950 he was raised to the Supreme Court, and in 1953 became chief justice. He retired in 1957 on reaching the judicial retirement age of 70. He was succeeded on the court by John Hamilton King, and as Chief Justice by Patrick B. O'Sullivan.

Inglis served as a trustee of Wesleyan University from 1932 to 1959.

He married Agnes Thompson (Wesleyan class of 1910); they had five children.
