= Charles S. House =

American judge (1908–1996)

Member of the Connecticut Senate from the 4th district
- In office 1947–1951
- Preceded by: William E. Hanmer
- Succeeded by: Elmer Watson

Member of the Connecticut House of Representatives from Manchester
- In office 1941–1943 Serving with Leland T. Wood
- Preceded by: William C. Cheney; William J. Thornton
- Succeeded by: S. Raymond Smith; George E. Keith

Personal details
- Born: April 24, 1908 Manchester, Connecticut, U.S.
- Died: November 8, 1996 (aged 88) Manchester, Connecticut, U.S.
- Party: Republican
- Education: Harvard College (A.B.); Harvard Law School (LL.B.)

Charles Staver House (April 24, 1908 – November 8, 1996) was a Connecticut lawyer and politician who served as a justice of the Connecticut Supreme Court from July 1, 1965, to April 24, 1978.

Born in Manchester, Connecticut, House's father operated a regional department store, and House decided to become a lawyer after spending a summer delivering ice to Manchester households, which often involved carrying blocks of ice up several flights of stairs. He received an A.B. from Harvard College in 1930, where he was an editor of The Harvard Lampoon, followed by an LL.B. from Harvard Law School in 1933.

After briefly working for a prominent law firm in Hartford, Connecticut, House served as a local prosecutor and deputy judge in Manchester. He was elected to represent Manchester in the Connecticut House of Representatives in 1941, and to two terms in the Connecticut State Senate, beginning in 1947, serving as Republican minority leader from 1949 to 1951. He chaired the town's Board of Education from 1942 to 1953, and from 1951 to 1953 he served as a legal adviser to Governor John Davis Lodge.

In 1953, Governor Lodge appointed House to the Connecticut Superior Court, and in 1965, he was appointed to the state Supreme Court by Governor John N. Dempsey. He became chief justice in 1971. In 1977, he authored an opinion of the court that he considered to be his most significant legal achievement, writing in Horton v. Meskill that public schools relying on local property taxes resulted in unconstitutional inequality, and requiring the state to provide funds to balance the resources of schools in poorer districts.

He left the court after reaching the mandatory retirement age. He died in a nursing home, in Manchester.

Political offices
Preceded by John M. Comley	Justice of the Connecticut Supreme Court; 1965–1978	Succeeded by Ellen Ash Peters
