= William Hamersley =

American judge (1838–1920)

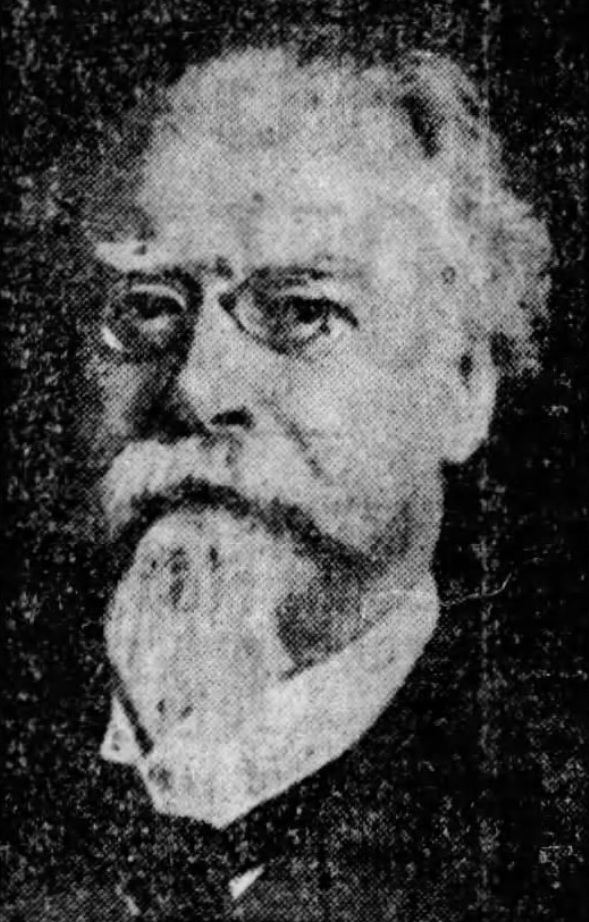
- Judge William Hamersley

Justice of the Connecticut Supreme Court
- In office 1893–1908

Personal details
- Born: September 9, 1838 Hartford, Connecticut, U.S.
- Died: September 17, 1920 (aged 82) Hartford, Connecticut, U.S.
- Education: Trinity College; Harvard Law School

William Hamersley (September 9, 1838 – September 17, 1920) was a prosecutor, state legislator, and justice of the Connecticut Supreme Court from 1894 to 1908.

== Early life, education, and career ==
Born in Hartford, Connecticut, the son of William James Hamersley, a newspaper editor and twice mayor of Hartford, and Laura Sophia Cooke, daughter of Oliver Dudley Cooke, a Congregational clergyman and publisher, Hamersley's ancestry traced both to Puritan settlers and to William Hamersley, an officer of the British warship Valeur who settled in New York in 1716. Hamersley attended public schools in Hartford, studied at Trinity College and Harvard Law School, and completed his legal studies in the Hartford office of Welch & Shipman. He gained admission to the bar in Connecticut in 1859.

Hamersley began his practice independently in Hartford and entered local politics as a member of the city common council, serving as vice president in 1866 and president in 1867–68. He was elected city attorney in 1866, resigning in 1868 to accept appointment as state's attorney for Hartford County, a position he held for twenty years. He was widely respected as a prosecutor, noted for combining zeal and fairness, and described as one of the most distinguished attorneys to hold the office.

== Political and judicial service ==
Hamersley played a key role in reforming Connecticut civil procedure as a member of the 1878 commission that drafted the Practice Act and related court rules. In 1886 he represented Hartford in the Connecticut House of Representatives, serving on the judiciary and federal relations committees, and again advocated for the Practice Act.

In 1893 Hamersley was appointed to the Connecticut Superior Court by Governor Luzon B. Morris but was quickly elevated to the Connecticut Supreme Court of Errors, where he served until reaching the mandatory retirement age in 1908. On the bench he was known for his independence of judgment, strict adherence to separation of powers, and moral courage in issuing unpopular decisions. One of his notable opinions was in McGovern v. Mitchell (78 Conn. 545), upholding judicial salary increases despite strong public opposition.

Beyond his judicial service, Hamersley was a founder of the Connecticut State Bar Association and participated in forming the American Bar Association alongside Richard D. Hubbard and Simeon E. Baldwin. He also served as a trustee of Trinity College from 1884, and lectured on constitutional law there from 1875 to 1900, receiving an honorary LL.D. in 1893.

After reaching the constitutional age limit for judicial service, Hamersley served as a referee and on the Connecticut State Library Committee.

== Personal life and death ==
Hamersley married twice, first to Cynthia Williams of Painesville, Ohio, on October 19, 1870, and second to Jane Allen of Old Saybrook, Connecticut, on October 25, 1882. He had two children by his second marriage, these being Janet, who died in 1910, and William James Hamersley, who died in 1918 during the influenza pandemic while engaged in Red Cross service at Camp Devens. Hamersley was survived by his second wife and a granddaughter.

Hamersley died at his home in Hartford at the age of 82.

Political offices
Preceded by Elisha Carpenter	Justice of the Connecticut Supreme Court; 1894–1908	Succeeded by Alberto T. Roraback
