= Anthony E. Grillo =

American judge (1915–1999)

Anthony E. Grillo (January 21, 1915 – February 5, 1999) was a justice of the Connecticut Supreme Court from 1983 to 1985.

Born in Hamden, Connecticut, Grillo attended the public schools of that town, and received a BA from Yale University in 1936, and a JD from Yale Law School in 1941. In order to pay for college he taught Spanish and English in the New Haven evening school program.

In September 1941 he volunteered for service in the United States Army starting as a private and four and a half years later he was discharged as a lieutenant. During his military service he graduated from the Army's counterintelligence school and met his wife, the daughter of a representative of the Dutch government, while he was stationed in Aruba.

Upon his discharge he returned to New Haven and passed the bar exam in 1946. He then went on to become associated with the New Haven firm of O'Keefe, Johnson and O'Keefe. He was later associated with William Halloran and Frank Daley. After the latter association he opened his own office and began practicing law independently.

He remained active in Democratic politics and civic groups across his hometown of Hamden. He was a prosecutor in the town court and later became town counsel. Grillo was also active on the service side of Hamden community life and was one of the original group that brought the first Lion's Club charter to town, eventually becoming president of the same organization. He was also influential in a group known as the Better Boys Brigade, preparing boys to become good citizens, and he worked in the Boy Scout movement. In 1954, Grillo was the Democratic nominee for Connecticut State Treasurer and lost the race with 49.41% to Republican John Ottaviano Jr.'s 50.59%.

In 1959, Governor Abraham Ribicoff appointed Grillo to be the workers' compensation commissioner for the third district. In 1964, Governor John N. Dempsey appointed Commissioner Grillo to the Court of Common Pleas, and in 1967 that same governor appointed him to the Superior Court. On February 18, 1983, Governor William A. O'Neill elevated Judge Grillo to the Supreme Court, where he served until January 21, 1985, when he reached the constitutional age limitation of seventy years. Despite the fact that he served on the Supreme Court for only two years, he authored fifty-six opinions.

Political offices
Preceded by Anthony J. Armentano	Justice of the Connecticut Supreme Court; 1983–1985	Succeeded by Angelo G. Santaniello
