= William P. Barber =

American judge (c. 1907–1984)

William P. Barber (May 6, 1907 – July 5, 1984) was a justice of the Connecticut Supreme Court from 1975 to 1977.

== Early life and education ==
Barber was born in Putnam, Connecticut. He graduated from Clark University and the University of Virginia School of Law in 1933.

== Career ==
After graduating, he returned to Putnam and entered independent practice. In 1937, he became the city judge of Putnam, and was elected mayor in 1940 as a Democrat, serving from 1940 to 1944 and from 1948 to 1949. He also served in the Connecticut State Senate in 1943, 1945, 1949, 1951, and 1953. In 1957, he was promoted to the Connecticut Court of Common Pleas.

In 1961, Governor John N. Dempsey appointed Barber to the Connecticut Superior Court as an associate justice.

On August 31, 1975, he was promoted by Governor Ella Grasso to a seat on the Connecticut Supreme Court vacated by the retirement of Justice Herbert S. MacDonald.

He served until his term ended on May 6, 1977, when he retired according to the constitutional limit of age.

== Personal life and death ==
Barber never married. He died at his home in Putnam, Connecticut, of a heart attack on July 5, 1984, at the age of 77.

Political offices
| Preceded by Herbert S. MacDonald | Justice of the Connecticut Supreme Court; 1975–1977 | Succeeded by John A. Speziale |
