= Allyn L. Brown =

American judge

Allyn Larrabee Brown (born Norwich, Connecticut, October 26, 1883; died in Norwich October 22, 1973) was a lawyer, judge, and chief justice of the Connecticut Supreme Court.

Brown attended the Norwich Free Academy and Brown University, graduating in 1905. He was a 1908 graduate of Harvard Law School and joined his father's law firm of Brown & Perkins in 1909 after being admitted to the bar in January 1909. In 1917 Brown was appointed as the first public defender in New London County.

In 1916 Brown was elected mayor of Norwich, being the youngest mayor ever to hold that position up to that time. He was elected to the state senate in 1920.

In 1921 he was appointed to the Superior Court. In 1935 he was raised to the Supreme Court, with the appointment taking effect in 1936, and in 1950 became chief justice. He retired in October 1953 on reaching the judicial retirement age of 70.

Brown served as trustee or director of a number of educational institutions - the Norwich Free Academy, the Mansfield Training School, Brown University, and Connecticut College. He received honorary L.L.D. degrees from Brown University in 1938 and Wesleyan University in 1950.

He married Marion M. Brown on June 4, 1913; they had two children, Frances H. and Allyn L. Brown Jr. Allyn L. Brown Jr. became a lawyer and served as president of the Connecticut Bar Association and state's attorney for New London County.

Political offices
Preceded by Frank D. Haines	Justice of the Connecticut Supreme Court; 1936–1953	Succeeded by Kenneth Wynne
