= Edward J. Quinlan =

American judge (1884–1965)

Justice of the Supreme Court of Errors
- In office September 22, 1953 – February 18, 1954
- Nominated by: Governor Wilbur L. Cross
- Appointed by: Connecticut General Assembly
- Preceded by: John A. Cornell
- Succeeded by: Edward J. Daly

Edward J. Quinlan (February 18, 1884 – January 24, 1965) was a justice of the Connecticut Supreme Court from 1953 to 1954.

== Early life ==
Edward J. Quinlan was born on February 18, 1884, in Branford, Connecticut, to Jeremiah and Frances Nugent Quinlan. His family moved to Meriden, Connecticut, where he attended a grammar school on Church Street, and then graduated from Meriden High School in 1902.

Quinlan enrolled at Tufts College but transferred to and graduated from Yale College with the class of 1907. He then enrolled in the Yale Law School and received his law degree in 1909. While at Yale Law School, he was elected to the editorial board of the Yale Law Journal.

Quinlan was admitted to the Connecticut Bar Association in 1909 and began to practice law in Greenwich. In 1912, he moved to Norwalk, where he became associated with a firm known as Light, Dunbar and Quinlan.

== Personal life ==
Quinlan was a trustee of the Thomas More House, the Catholic center at Yale. He was affiliated with the Knights of Columbus and was a member of the Monsignor Thomas J. Finn Council, of the Bishop Fenwick Assembly, of the Holy Name Society. He also served as president of the Norwalk-Wilton chapter of the American Red Cross.

Quinlan was married to Jane Fahy and had four children, Edward J. Quinlan Jr, Robert F. Quinlan, Mrs. (Jean) Harry J. McKeon, and Mrs. (Margaret) James A. McElroy.

== Career ==
Quinlan was nominated by Governor Wilbur L. Cross and was appointed by the Connecticut General Assembly. He began his career as a judge of the Common Court of Pleas. In 1936 he advanced to the Superior Court bench, and, on September 22, 1953, he advanced to the Supreme Court of Errors. He ended service on February 18, 1954, due to constitutional limitation on his age.

Political offices
Preceded by John A. Cornell	Justice of the Connecticut Supreme Court; 1953–1954	Succeeded by Edward J. Daly
