= Augustus H. Fenn =

American judge (1844–1897)

Augustus Hall Fenn (January 18, 1844 – September 12, 1897) was an American judge. He was justice of the Connecticut Supreme Court from 1893 until his death in 1897.

== Biography ==
=== Early life and career ===
Augustus Hall Fenn was born in Plymouth, Connecticut, to Augustus L. and Maria Hall Fenn, with ancestry in the state tracing back to their 1635 arrival there. He attended the common school in his native Plymouth and the high school in Waterbury, Connecticut. He "early showed unusual literary talent", and at fifteen published a volume of poems, although in his later life he studiously hid this volume from the public eye.

He began the study of law at the age of eighteen with Hon. Ammi Giddings in his native town, but relinquished it after a few months to enlist in the United States Army during the American Civil War. He entered the military service as lieutenant in the 19th Connecticut Infantry Regiment, in July, 1862. The following year, when his regiment became the 2d Connecticut Heavy Artillery, he was promoted to captain. The adjutant and historian of his regiment says of him: "He proved himself one of the best drill masters and disciplinarians in the regiment, and one of the most competent officers in every position". He served for a time on the staff of General Emory Upton, and was five times detailed as judge advocate. At the Battle of Cedar Creek he lost his right arm. Hospital surgeons who attended him proposed to muster him out for disability, but he protested, and through the influence of General Ranald S. Mackenzie, he was retained. "In less than seven weeks from the time his arm was taken off at the shoulder he reported for full duty", writes his regimental historian, and he subsequently participated in several engagements. He was promoted to major in January, 1865, and was brevetted lieutenant-colonel and colonel for conspicuous instances of bravery.

Fenn was mustered out of the military service with his regiment on August 18, 1865, and the following month resumed the study of law with Gen. S. W. Kellogg in Waterbury. He gained admission to the bar in Litchfield County, Connecticut, on February 15, 1867. He then pursued a course of study for a year at the Harvard Law School, from which he received a bachelor of laws. After practicing for a year in Waterbury he opened an office in his native town, where he continued in the practice of his profession until 1875. He was judge of probate for several years in Plymouth, also holding several other minor public offices. In 1875 he was the Republican nominee for Connecticut Secretary of State, but his party ticket was unsuccessful in that election. Fenn was defeated by Marvin H. Sanger, who won 52.2% to Fenn's 43.1%.

In 1876 he moved to Winsted. Having become an ardent admirer of Samuel J. Tilden in his fight against the "Tammany ring" of New York, Fenn determined to support Tilden if the latter ran for president, and therefore became allied with the Democratic party.

== Political and judicial service ==
Fenn served multiple terms as the judge of probate for the Winchester district. He became a recognized authority in the state. In 1884, Fenn represented Winchester in the Connecticut General Assembly, where he served on the judiciary committee and chaired the committee on forfeited rights. The following year, the Governor appointed him to a committee tasked with revising the state statutes.

Despite changing his political affiliation, Fenn was not seen as a staunch partisan. In 1887, Republican governor Phineas C. Lounsbury nominated him to the Superior Court, and in 1892, another Republican governor, Morgan Bulkeley, appointed him as an associate justice of the state supreme court. The state senate confirmed Fenn and fellow nominee Simeon E. Baldwin to seats on the court on February 1, 1887. Fenn valued these appointments and publicly stated that he would not seek any political position that would put him in competition with a Republican, out of gratitude for the trust shown by his political opponents. In the 1896 presidential campaign, Fenn aligned himself with the Republican Party.

He began his tenure as a regular member of the Supreme Court in May 1891, although his appointment was officially completed on February 2, 1893. His final duties were at the May term in Norwich in 1897. Fenn was highly regarded by his colleagues for his demeanor, industry, and extensive legal knowledge, which included reading "not only the common books of the law but some which are not commonly looked at", including "the text of Littleton in the Norman French, Fearne's Contingent Remainders, and had gone over Coke's second, third and fourth Institutes".

Fenn was president of the Connecticut Army and Navy Club at time of his death, a member of the Grand Army of the Republic, and of the Loyal Legion.

=== Personal life and death ===
Fenn married twice. His first wife was Frances M. Smith, whom he married in 1868; and his second wife was Mary E. Lincoln, whom he married in 1879. Four of his children, two with each wife, were still living at the time of his 1897 death.

Fenn died in Winsted at the age of 53.

Political offices
Preceded by Dwight Loomis	Justice of the Connecticut Supreme Court; 1893–1897	Succeeded by Frederick B. Hall
