= David Sanford (New York attorney) =

David W. Sanford
- Born: February 10, 1957 (age 69)
- Education: Vassar College (BA); University of North Carolina at Chapel Hill (MA); Stanford Law School (JD)
- Occupation: Attorney
- Title: Chairman and Co-Founder of Sanford Heisler Sharp McKnight LLP
- Website: https://sanfordheisler.com/

David W. Sanford (born February 10, 1957) is an American civil rights attorney. He is the chairman and co-founder of Sanford Heisler Sharp McKnight LLP, a public interest law firm credited with shaping modern standards for workplace equity, systemic discrimination claims, and corporate accountability.

Sanford has served as lead counsel in more than 50 class action lawsuits involving gender and race discrimination, ERISA violations, and False Claims Act matters. He is best known for securing a $253 million jury verdict in Velez v. Novartis (2010), which was recognized as the largest gender discrimination verdict in U.S. employment history.

== Education ==
Sanford received his JD from Stanford Law School at the age of 35, in 1995. He completed his master's degree and an ABD from the University of North Carolina at Chapel Hill and his bachelor's degree from Vassar College in 1980.

== Legal Career ==
=== Early Career and Firm Founding ===
Sanford did not start his career as an attorney. He was an assistant professor in the Philosophy Department at Williams College, and also taught at the University of North Carolina at Chapel Hill and Oberlin. After law school, David Sanford did a clerkship for Senior United States District Judge of the United States District Court for the District of Columbia. After clerking, he joined the law firm of David Boies and then moved to another law firm, Jones, Day Reavis & Pogue. In 2004, he co-founded Sanford Heisler (now Sanford Heisler Sharp McKnight) with Jeremy Heisler in Washington, D.C.

He has served as chairman of the firm since 2012. Over the past two decades, the firm has expanded to six offices nationwide and a team of roughly 100 professionals, including more than 50 attorneys and 20 partners. The firm's practice encompasses a broad range of civil rights and public interest litigation, including:

- Discrimination and Harassment
- Whistleblower and Qui Tam
- Financial Management and ERISA Litigation
- Executive Representation
- Sexual Violence, Title IX, and Victims' Rights
- Asian American Litigation and Finance
- Wage Theft and Overtime Violations
- Trial and Appellate Practice
- Public Interest Litigation

=== Landmark Verdicts and Legal Impact ===
Sanford has served as lead or co-lead counsel in several high-profile employment, discrimination, ERISA, and whistleblower actions that have resulted in precedent-setting rulings, significant financial recoveries, or institutional policy reforms.

==== Velez v. Novartis Pharmaceuticals Corp. (2010) ====
Sanford secured a $253 million jury verdict on behalf of approximately 7,000 female sales representatives alleging gender discrimination in pay and promotion. The case later settled for $175 million and included $22.5 million in mandated human resources reforms. The verdict was recognized as the largest gender discrimination award in U.S. employment history and was named by the United Nations as one of the top ten global advancements in women's rights of the year.

==== Ravina v. Bekaert and Columbia University (2017) ====
A jury found Columbia University and Professor Geert Bekaert liable for retaliation against former faculty member Enrichetta Ravina and awarded $1.25 million in damages.

==== Campbell v. Chadbourne & Parke LLP (2016–2018) ====
Sanford represented law firm partner Kerrie Campbell in a Title VII lawsuit alleging systemic pay discrimination against female partners. The case helped clarify that law firm partners may be considered employees under Title VII protections. It settled in 2018.

==== Henderson v. Cracker Barrel (early 2000s) ====
Sanford served as lead counsel in a class action alleging systemic race discrimination in pay, promotion, and treatment of African American employees and customers. The case, later joined by the United States Department of Justice, settled for $8.7 million.

==== Pan et al. v. Qualcomm Inc. (2016) ====
Sanford served as lead counsel in a gender discrimination class action against Qualcomm Incorporated on behalf of approximately 3,300 female employees working in science, technology, engineering, and mathematics (STEM) and related roles. Filed in the U.S. District Court for the Southern District of California, the case alleged systemic gender and pregnancy discrimination in pay and promotions, as well as employment policies that disproportionately penalized caregivers of school-aged children, in violation of Title VII of the Civil Rights Act, the Equal Pay Act, and California law.

In July 2016, the parties reached a $19.5 million settlement that included both monetary relief and extensive programmatic reforms. As part of the agreement, Qualcomm committed to retaining independent industrial-organizational consultants to evaluate its policies and practices, appointing an internal compliance official to oversee implementation, and adopting structural measures to promote gender equity in compensation, evaluation, and advancement. The settlement was among the first large-scale technology-sector resolutions to combine financial compensation with comprehensive institutional reforms.

==== Snyder v. UnitedHealth Group (ERISA Class Action) ====
Sanford served as class counsel in litigation involving over 350,000 retirement plan participants alleging breach of fiduciary duties under ERISA. The court approved a $69 million settlement in 2024, reported as the largest single-plan ERISA settlement involving failure to remove imprudent investment options.

==== Hedgepeth v. Garland (U.S. Marshals Service Class Action) ====
Sanford represented more than 700 African American Deputy U.S. Marshals and Detention Enforcement Officers alleging systemic race discrimination dating back to 1994. In 2024, the Equal Employment Opportunity Commission approved a $15 million settlement that included both monetary relief and programmatic reforms.

==== Vacatur Proceedings – State of Maryland v. Adnan Syed (2022–2024) ====
Sanford represented Young Lee, the brother of murder victim Hae Min Lee, in challenging the vacatur of Adnan Syed's murder conviction. In 2024, the Maryland Supreme Court ruled that crime victims must receive reasonable notice and an opportunity for in-person participation in post-conviction vacatur hearings. The State later withdrew its motion after acknowledging it contained “false and misleading statements.”

=== Representation in Executive and Workplace Discrimination Cases ===
Sanford has represented hundreds of executives, law firm partners, general counsel, physicians, and senior professionals across the finance, legal, health care, biotechnology, consulting, fashion, telecommunications, pharmaceutical, and technology sectors. His work has centered on claims involving gender and race discrimination, retaliation, wrongful termination, and unequal pay, as well as disputes over executive compensation and employment agreements. Under his leadership, Sanford Heisler Sharp McKnight has negotiated hundreds of millions of dollars in pre-suit and class settlements for employees and executives alleging systemic inequities in the workplace.

== Recognition ==
Sanford was inducted into The National Law Journal's Elite Trial Lawyers Hall of Fame in 2015. He has been recognized multiple times by Law360 as an Employment MVP (2014, 2015, 2016, 2018) and named a Titan of the Plaintiffs’ Bar. In 2018, he was a finalist for The American Lawyer’s Attorney of the Year.

Sanford has been consistently ranked by Chambers and Partners as a Leader in Employment Law since 2017 and holds an AV Preeminent® rating from Martindale-Hubbell. He has been listed in The Best Lawyers in America® for Employment Law – Individuals and Employment Litigation for multiple consecutive years.

He has also been named among the Lawdragon 500 Leading Civil Rights & Plaintiff Employment Lawyers (2018–2025), recognized by Super Lawyers as a Top-Rated Employment & Labor Attorney (2014–2020, 2023–2025), and included in Benchmark Litigation's list of the Top 50 Labor & Employment Litigators in the United States as well as earning designation as a Benchmark Litigation Star 2025.

In 2024, Forbes included Sanford in its inaugural list of America's Top 200 Lawyers, and in 2025 he was named to the Forbes Best-In-State Lawyers list for Employment Litigation in New York.
