= John R. Thim =

American judge (1902–1988)

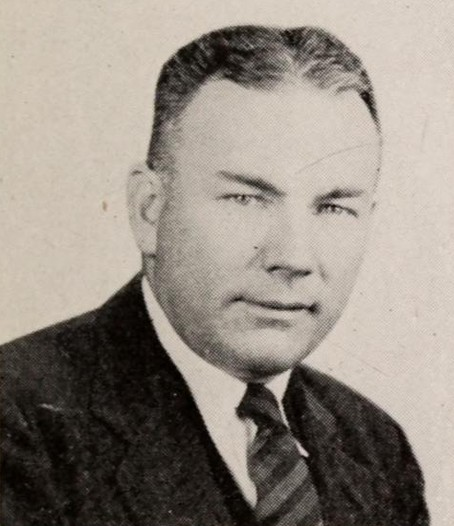
- Thim c. 1946

Member of the Connecticut House of Representatives from Hamden
- In office 1943–1951
- Preceded by: C. Raymond Brock; Frederick A. Kirk
- Succeeded by: Harry Neal; Edward R. Kummer

Personal details
- Born: April 29, 1902 New Haven, Connecticut, U.S.
- Died: December 6, 1988 (aged 86) Hamden, Connecticut, U.S.
- Party: Republican

John R. Thim (April 29, 1902 – December 6, 1988) was an American lawyer and politician who served as Speaker of the Connecticut House of Representatives in 1949, and as a justice of the Connecticut Supreme Court from 1966 to 1972.

== Early life, education, and career ==
Born in New Haven, Connecticut, Thim was admitted to practice law before the Supreme Court of the District of Columbia in October 1925, and entered the practice of law in New Haven in 1926, having been one of 39 applicants to pass the Connecticut bar in that city in January 1926, out of 104 candidates.

== Political and judicial service ==
Thim was a judge of the Hamden Town Court from 1941 to 1951. He represented Hamden, in the state House of Representatives from 1943 to 1951. On December 21, 1948, Thim was selected by the Connecticut Republican Party to serve as Speaker of the Connecticut House of Representatives for the session to be held in 1949.

On July 20, 1966, Thim and Elmer W. Ryan were both sworn in as justices of the state supreme court. Thim served until 1972, when he reached the mandatory retirement age for justices.

== Personal life and death ==
Thim married Mary Flom, with whom he had a daughter and three sons. He died at his home in Hamden at the age of 86, following a lengthy illness.

Political offices
Preceded by James C. Shannon	Justice of the Connecticut Supreme Court; 1966–1972	Succeeded by Herbert S. MacDonald
Preceded by Frederick H. Holbrook	Speaker of the Connecticut House of Representatives; 1949–1949	Succeeded by Mansfield D. Sprague
