= John W. Banks =

American judge (1867–1958)

John Wallace Banks (September 22, 1867 – March 8, 1958) was a justice of the Connecticut Supreme Court from June 30, 1927 to September 22, 1937.

== Early life, education, and career ==
Born in Bethlehem, Connecticut, to the Reverend George Wallace Banks and Eliza Frances, Banks attended Guilford High School, and graduated from Yale University in 1889, where he was in Phi Beta Kappa. He graduated from Yale Law School in 1893, where he was an editor of the Yale Law Journal, and entered the practice of law in Bridgeport, Connecticut. In 1898, Edwin Stark Thomas, a United States district judge of the United States District Court for the District of Connecticut, appointed Banks to serve as a Referee in Bankruptcy, making Banks "the first man to be appointed to that position in Connecticut". Over the next two decades, Banks continued to practice law, both in partnerships and as a solo practitioner, also serving on a state committee for the revision of statutes from 1915 to 1918.

== Judicial service ==
In 1919, Governor Marcus H. Holcomb appointed Banks to the Connecticut Superior Court, with Banks being sworn in on January 10, 1920, and obtaining a reputation for speeding the legal process along by identifying and eliminating irrelevant issues. On June 30, 1927, Banks was sworn in to succeed Howard J. Curtis on the state supreme court. His opinions were described as concise, and having a "penchant for relevancy". He served until his 70th birthday, thereby reaching the mandatory age of retirement from the supreme court, on September 22, 1937, and was succeeded by Newell Jennings, who was elevated from the superior court.

== Personal life ==
On June 7, 1896, Banks married Mary Cowles Gray. They had no children. Banks was an avid fisherman and golfer, and on his retirement from the court was presented by his fellow judges with camping and fishing gear.

Banks died in a convalescent home in Fairfield, Connecticut, at the age of 90.

Political offices
Preceded by Howard J. Curtis	Justice of the Connecticut Supreme Court; 1927–1937	Succeeded by Newell Jennings
