= John Chester (Connecticut soldier) =

American soldier and politician (1749–1809)

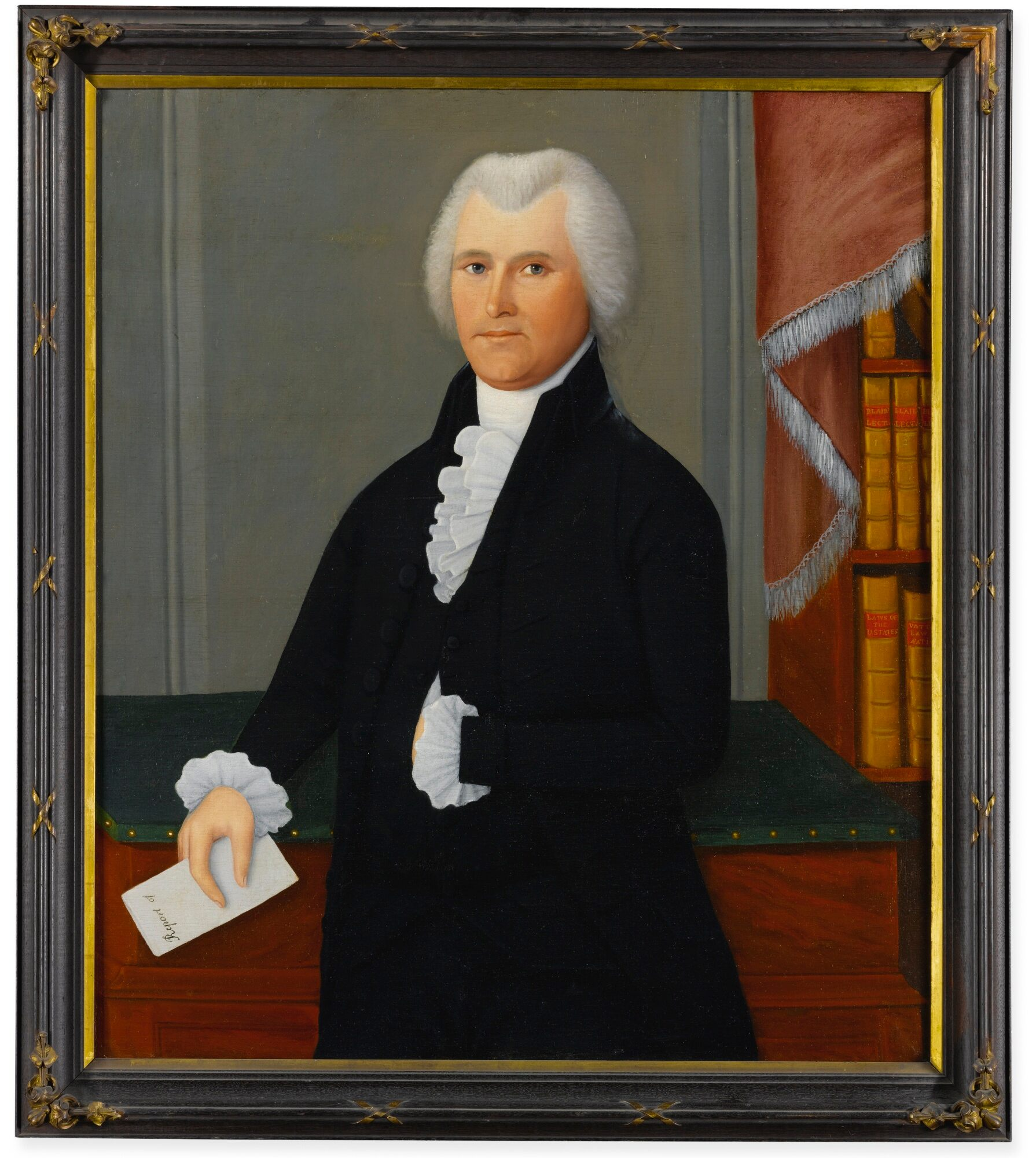
- Portrait by Joseph Steward
- Born: 1749
- Died: 1809
- Education: Yale University
- Spouse: Elizabeth Huntington Chester
- Parents: John Chester (father); Sarah Noyes Chester (mother)

Coat of Arms of John Chester

John Chester (1749–1809) was a militia officer and public official from Connecticut. Before the American Revolution, he was a militia officer and member of the Connecticut General Assembly. During the American Revolutionary War, he saw action from the Battle of Bunker Hill to the Battle of Trenton as part of Connecticut's troops, but he did not join the Continental Army, and left military service after 1776. He served as Speaker of the Connecticut House of Representatives, among other public offices, and was an original member of the Society of the Cincinnati. He was a judge of the Connecticut Supreme Court of Errors from 1788 to 1792 and from 1803 to 1807. His grandson Samuel Chester Reid served in the United States Navy during the War of 1812.
