= Roger Wolcott (Connecticut politician) =

American lawyer, militia officer, politician, and judge (1679–1767)

Deputy Governor
- In office 1741–1750
- Preceded by: Jonathan Law
- Succeeded by: Thomas Fitch

Personal details
- Born: January 4, 1679 Windsor, Connecticut
- Died: May 17, 1767 (aged 88) Windsor, Connecticut
- Spouse: Sarah Drake Wolcott
- Children: Roger Wolcott; Elizabeth Wolcott Newberry; Alexander Wolcott; Josiah Wolcott; Hepzibah Wolcott Strong; Erastus Wolcott; Ursula Wolcott Griswold; Oliver Wolcott; Marian Wolcott Williams (Among Others)
- Occupation: Weaver, Statesman, Politician

Major-General Roger Wolcott (January 4, 1679 – May 17, 1767) was an American lawyer, militia officer, politician, and judge who served as the governor of Connecticut from 1750 to 1754.

== Biography ==
Wolcott was born the son of Simon Wolcott and Martha Pitkin Wolcott in Windsor, Connecticut. His formal education was severely limited by the nature of the frontier village, so at age twelve he was apprenticed to a weaver, and at the age of twenty-one entered that business on his own. He married Sarah Drake on December 3, 1702, and they had fifteen children before her death in 1748. Their son Oliver Wolcott signed the Declaration of Independence and went on to become governor of Connecticut. Another son, Erastus Wolcott, became a state legislator and supreme court judge.

== Career ==
Coat of Arms of Oliver Wolcott

In May 1709, Wolcott was admitted to the bar and began to practice law. In 1711, during Queen Anne's War, He accompanied militia forces on an expedition to Quebec as a commissary. On his return he served as Clerk of the House, 1710-1711 and was elected Deputy to the colony's Lower House in 1709-1714, 1718, 1719, serving as Speaker in October, 1719. In 1714 he was elected to the Upper House (also called the Council) and served as Assistant, 1714-1718, 1720-1741, 1754-1760. He was Commissioner of Connecticut for the Adjustment of Colonial boundaries, 1717, 1718, 1723-1726, 1728, 1730, 1737, 1740, 1742, 1750. Captain of the Trainband of Windsor, 1722. Captain of Troops raised for active service, 1724. He was made judge of the Hartford County court in 1723, serving through 1732, and of the colony's Superior Court in 1732, serving through 1741. Wolcott was made Colonel of the First regiment, 1739.

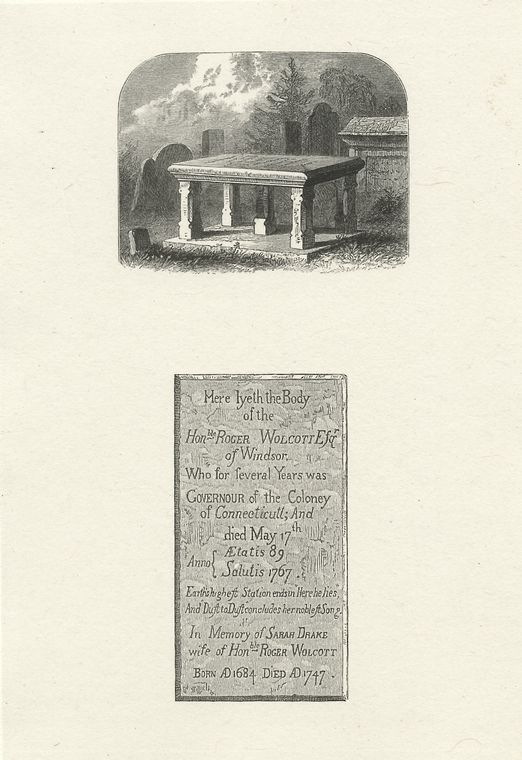
Illustration of the grave of Roger Wolcott and wife Sarah, Old Burying Ground, Windsor

In 1741 Wolcott was elected Deputy Governor of the colony. As deputy governors traditionally served as the chief justice of the Superior Court of Connecticut, he also assumed that position, which he held until 1750.

In 1745 Wolcott was again active in the militia, this time as the rank of major general. In King George's War, Massachusetts governor William Shirley issued a general call to the New England colonies for an expedition against the French in Île-Royale (present-day Cape Breton Island). Wolcott served as Commander-in-Chief of the Forces in the Expedition to Cape Breton. General Wolcott headed the Connecticut troops in Sir William Pepperrell's expedition that captured Fortress Louisbourg.

With the death of Governor Jonathan Law in 1750, Wolcott succeeded to the position of governor. He was re-elected annually to that position through 1753. Shortly after he retired as governor, his son, Roger Wolcott, Sr., attended negotiations with six other British colonies and around 200 members of various Indian nations at the Albany Congress in June and July 1754. During his administration, a disabled Spanish ship, the St. Joseph and St. Helena, with a cargo valued at 400,000 Spanish dollars, ran aground near New London.

Wolcott ordered the ship seized and the cargo impounded in order to allow time to resolve conflicting claims between the vessel's captain and the salvage crew. While in the colony's custody, a large portion of the ship's cargo mysteriously disappeared. Tainted with the scandal surrounding the Spanish Ship case, he was defeated for re-election in 1754. All previous governors had died in office. Following his defeat, Wolcott generally withdrew from public life to study and follow literary pursuits. In 1759, Wolcott authored a short history of the Connecticut colony titled, Roger Wolcott's Memoir Relating to the History of Connecticut.

== Death ==
Wolcott died at home in Windsor at the age of 88, and is interred at the Old Burying Ground (Palisado Cemetery) there.

Political offices
| Preceded by Jonathan Law | Governor of the Connecticut Colony; 1750–54 | Succeeded by Thomas Fitch |
