= Roger Minott Sherman =

American judge (1773–1844)

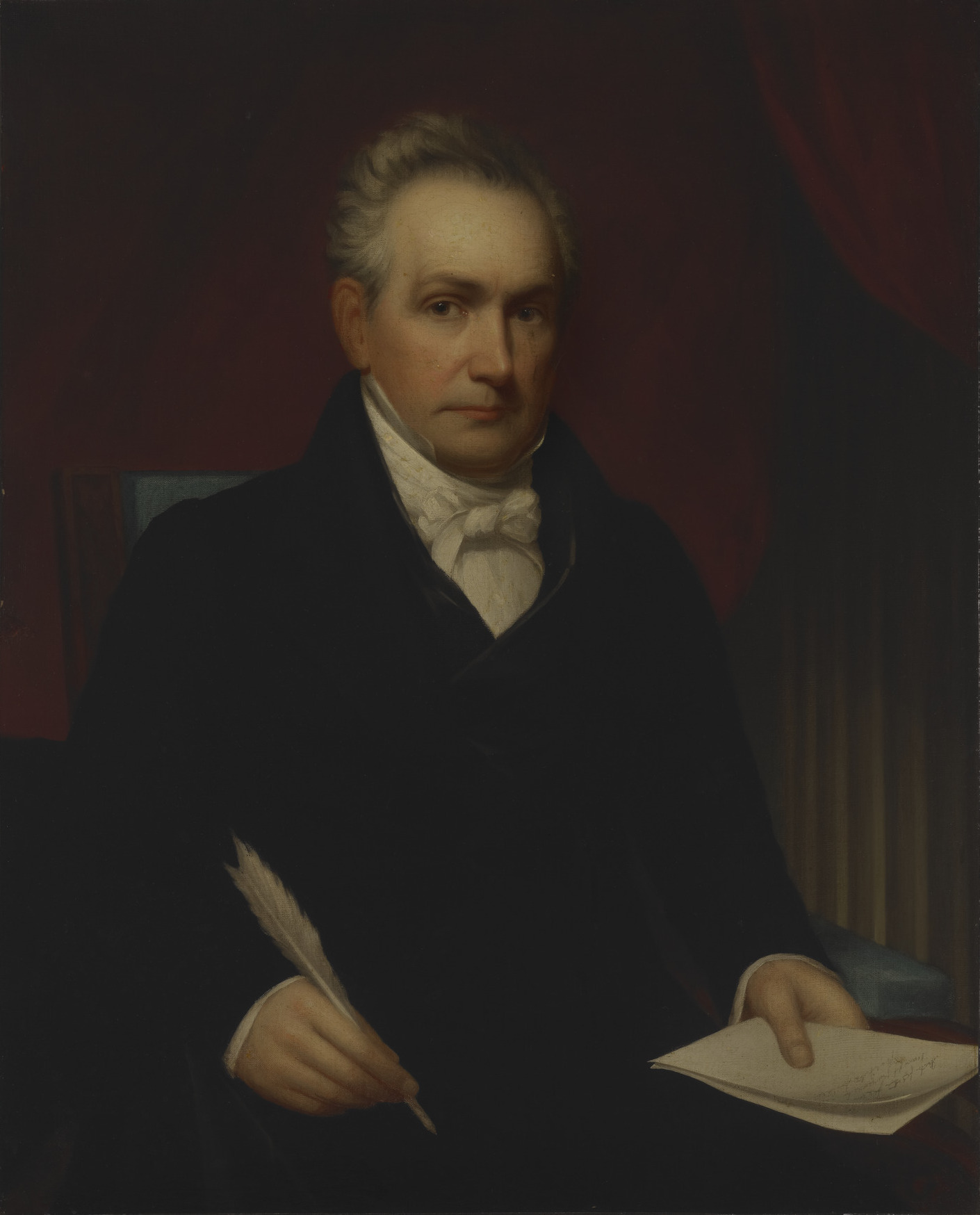
- Sherman painted c.1840 by Nathaniel Jocelyn
- Born: May 22, 1773; Woburn, Massachusetts
- Died: December 30, 1844 (aged 71); Fairfield, Connecticut
- Education: Yale College; Litchfield Law School
- Occupation: Jurist

Roger Minott Sherman (May 22, 1773 – December 30, 1844) was a lawyer and politician from Fairfield County, Connecticut.

== Early life, family, and education ==
Roger Minott Sherman, born May 22, 1773, was the youngest of six children of Rev. Josiah Sherman who was a brother of the distinguished Roger Sherman. His mother was Martha Minott, the daughter of James and Elizabeth (Merrick) Minott (Note: The two were the aunt and uncle of Roger Sherman's second wife Rebecca Minot Prescott.) of Concord, Massachusetts. Roger Minott Sherman's eldest sister Elizabeth Sherman married John Mitchell, they were the parents of U.S. Representative Henry Mitchell (New York politician). His other sister Martha Sherman married the Rev. Justus Mitchell, and they were the great-grandparents of US Senator Chauncey Depew.

By this even the son was thrown upon his own resources, except so far as his uncle, for whom he was named, assisted him. Through his sophomore year he boarded at his uncle's house and for the later years of his Yale College course he supported himself by teaching in New Haven, Connecticut.

After graduation he began the study of law in Windsor, under the direction of Oliver Ellsworth, and at the same time taught an academy. After about two years he removed to the Litchfield Law School, where he continued his studies with Tapping Reeve, while teaching a common school.

In February, 1795, he was elected a tutor at Yale College, and on March 12 began his duties succeeding James Gould, of the Class of 1791, in the instruction of the sophomore (2nd year) class, and at the same time continuing the study of law with the Roger Sherman's son-in-law, Simeon Baldwin (Yale 1781). He united with the church in Yale College by profession of his faith on May 1, 1796, and ever after made the advancement of the interests of religion a prime object.

== Career ==
In 1796, Roger Minott Sherman was admitted to the New Haven bar. In May of that year, he resigned his tutorship and settled in Norwalk, Connecticut. Sherman would serve as the representative of Norwalk, where he also practiced law, in the Connecticut General Assembly in the two sessions of 1798.

In 1807, he moved to Fairfield where the principal courts were at that time held, and where he resided until the time of his death. He continued at the bar for forty-three years, and his business as an advocate was very extensive.

It is believed that he argued more causes than any other lawyer who practiced in Connecticut during the first half of the nineteenth century. He did comparatively little office-business, but devoted his time to the trial of causes in court, and he also for more than twenty-five years attended the state legislature as an advocate in cases pending before that body. He was deeply interested in the administration of justice as provided for by legislative enactment, and many of the statutes of the state in the realm of municipal law during his active life were drawn up and their passage procured by him.

In 1814, he was elected to the Connecticut Governor's Council (Note: The Governor's Council was the predecessor to the Connecticut State Senate.) where he served until the enactment of the new state constitution in 1818. During this time he declined a nomination to the United States Congress. In 1814, he was appointed a delegate to the Hartford Convention, in the proceedings of which he took an active part. He had been actively interested also in the steps preliminary to the call of the Convention, and was the author of the Report to the Connecticut Legislature, of the Committee which had recommended the appointment of delegates.

After the death of Yale College President Timothy Dwight in 1817, he was considered by some as a candidate for the presidency of Yale.

In 1829, the honorary degree of Doctor of Laws was conferred on him by the Corporation of Yale College. He was a representative of Fairfield in the Connecticut General Assembly in 1825 and 1838. A year later, in May 1839, he was appointed to the Supreme Court of Errors of Connecticut and granted a judicial seat in a superior court. His legal knowledge, his thoroughness and independence, and his inflexible integrity contributed to make his tenure of this office highly successful.

== Declining health and death ==
Due to ill health, Sherman resigned in May 1842 from his extant judicial positions. During the last years of his life he suffered from acute disease, and consequently lived in retirement, though his intellectual capacities were unimpaired.

In December, 1844, he was seized with more severe illness, and declined rapidly until his death, in Fairfield, on December 30. The discourse preached at his funeral by his pastor, Lyman Hotchkiss Atwater, was afterwards published. Sherman had been elected deacon in the church in Fairfield in 1810, but resigned before his death.

== Personal life ==
On December 13, 1796, he married Elizabeth (or Betsy) Gould. She died in Fairfield, after years of feeble health, on August 3, 1848, in her 75th year. Her will, made in pursuance of her husband's, bequeathed their homestead, with an endowment fund to the First Ecclesiastical Society of Fairfield. Among other public bequests was one of $4,000 to Yale College. The value of the entire estate was over $71,000 at the time.

Their only children were twin sons whose health failed early.

== Bibliography ==
Further reading

- Hamlen, B. L. (September 10, 2010). Sketch Of The Life And Character Of Roger Minott Sherman (1846). Kessinger Publishing. pp. 1–24.
- Sherman, Thomas Townsend (1920). Sherman Genealogy Including Families of Essex, Suffolk and Norfolk, England. T. A. Wright. pp. 217, 219–220.
