= Tapping Reeve =

American lawyer, judge and law educator (1744–1823)

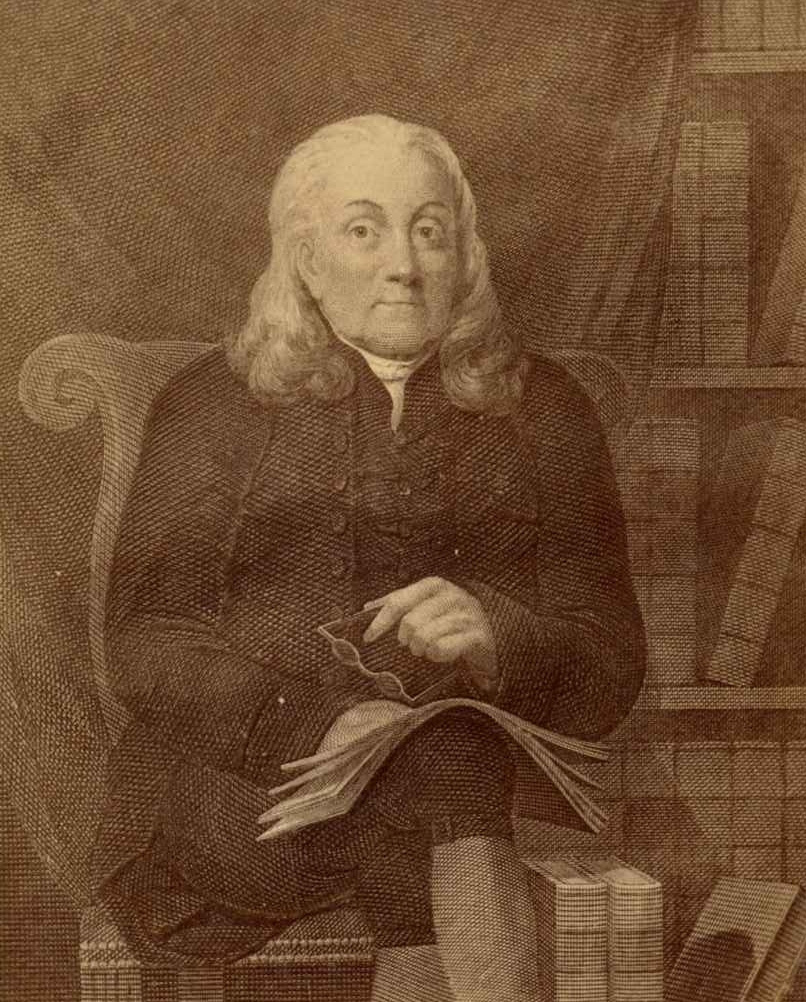
- Judge Tapping Reeve
- Born: October 1, 1744; Brookhaven, Province of New York
- Died: December 13, 1823 (aged 79); Litchfield, Connecticut, US
- Education: College of New Jersey (AB, 1763; AM, 1766)
- Occupations: Judge; lawyer; educator
- Spouses: Sarah "Sally" Burr (m. 1771; died 1797) Elizabeth "Betsy" Thompson (m. 1799)
- Children: Aaron Burr Reeve
- Parent(s): Abner Reeve; Deborah Tapping
- Relatives: Aaron Burr (brother-in-law); Aaron Burr Sr. (father-in-law)

Tapping Reeve (October 1, 1744 – December 13, 1823) was an American lawyer, judge, and law educator. In 1784 he opened the Litchfield Law School, the first law school in the United States, in Litchfield, Connecticut. He was also the brother-in-law of the third vice-president of the United States, Aaron Burr.

== Early life ==
Tapping Reeve was born in Brookhaven, New York, on Long Island, to Reverend Abner Reeve (1708–1798). He graduated from the College of New Jersey (now Princeton University) with a bachelor's degree in 1763, and continued on to earn a master's degree in 1766.

During his graduate studies at Princeton, Reeve also served as a headmaster of a grammar school in nearby Elizabeth, New Jersey, associated with the college. There, he tutored the two children of the college president, Rev. Aaron Burr Sr.: his son Aaron Burr Jr., a future Vice President of the United States, and his daughter Sarah Burr (known as Sally). Reeve married Sarah Burr on June 4, 1771, when he was 26 years old and she was 17 years old.

== Career ==
Reeve tutored at Princeton from 1767 to 1770. In 1771 he began to study law with Judge Jesse Root of Hartford, Connecticut. In 1772 he moved to Litchfield, situated on the crossroads of important inland trade routes, to open a new law practice. In 1773, he built a six-room, two-story house.

Reeve, while a fervent supporter of the patriot cause, did not enter active service early in the Revolutionary War. His wife's poor health held him at home. However, in December 1776, the Connecticut Assembly called upon him to travel the state to drum up volunteers for the Continental Army. He then accepted a commission as an officer and accompanied his recruits as far as New York before returning to his ailing wife.

Litchfield Law School, from a 1906 postcard

Reeve took his brother-in-law, Aaron Burr Jr. as a law student. In the beginning, Aaron Burr lived upstairs and took instruction in the downstairs parlor, adjacent to the gathering room where Reeve held mock court. Also on the first floor was Reeve's private law office.

In 1781 Reeve worked with Theodore Sedgwick to represent Elizabeth Freeman (known as Bett), a slave in Sheffield, Massachusetts, in a legal bid for her freedom. Bett had listened to discussions related to the Sheffield Declaration, and to a reading of the 1780 Massachusetts Constitution, the latter containing the phrase "all men are born free and equal". She then asked Sedgwick to take her case to a local court. Reeve and Sedgwick successfully secured her freedom on constitutional grounds. The case, Brom & Bett v. Ashley, set a precedent that led to the abolition of slavery in Massachusetts.

Due in part to notoriety gained from the Elizabeth Freeman case, Reeve's student enrollment began to grow. In 1784, he added a second building (known as the Samuel Seymour House) to house and instruct his law students. Among the students was John C. Calhoun who, like Aaron Burr, became Vice President of the United States.

Reeve unsuccessfully ran for Congress six times in the 1790s: he was first a candidate in the 1790 election for Connecticut's five at-large congressional seats, in which the top five candidates would win; Reeve placed sixth. He was then a candidate in a separate December 1790 special election for one of the five seats, finishing fourth of seven candidates. He later ran in the 1792 at-large election, and in an April 1793 special election for the seat vacated by Jonathan Sturges, finishing last in the latter two. His last two attempts were in a December 1797 special election and the 1798 at-large election.

In 1798, Reeve became a judge of Connecticut's Superior Court. He then hired James Gould, a former student, to assist in running the school. Together, they built up the most prominent law school of its time.

Reeve is also noted for bringing Reverend Lyman Beecher (father of Harriet Beecher Stowe) to Litchfield in 1810 to serve as a Presbyterian minister for over 25 years, during which time he became notable for his preaching against alcohol and Unitarianism.

In 1814, Reeve was appointed Chief Justice of the Supreme Court of Connecticut. At this time, Gould took over the law school. Reeve maintained contact with the school until 1820, three years before his death. The school continued to operate until 1833.

Reeve's Law of Baron and Femme, first published in 1816, was the preeminent American treatise on family law for much of the 19th century. It underwent revisions and re-publication in 1846, 1867, and 1888.

== Personal life and family ==
Reeve's only child, Aaron Burr Reeve, was born on October 3, 1780. Aaron Burr Reeve went on to graduate from Yale, and became a lawyer in Troy, New York. Aaron Burr Reeve died at 28 on the 1 Sept. in 1809. Leaving behind one child Tapping Burr Reeve born 16 August, 1809 Who died chidless. His Widow remarried after his death to David Judson Burr.

Sarah Reeve was often in ill health, and died on March 30, 1797. In 1799, Reeve married Elizabeth "Betsy" Thompson, with whom he had no children.

Reeve died on December 13, 1823, in Litchfield, Connecticut, at the age of 79. His home, now known as Tapping Reeve House and Law School, was designated a National Historic Landmark in 1965.

== Works ==
- The Law of Baron and Femme; of Parent and Child; of Guardian and Ward; of Master and Servant, etc. (New Haven, 1816; 2d ed., by Lucius E. Chittenden, Burlington, Vt., 1846; with appendix by J. W. Allen, 1857; 3d ed., by Amasa J. Parker and C. E. Baldwin, Albany, 1862)
- Treatise on the Law of Descents in the Several United States of America (New York, 1825)
