= Robert J. Callahan =

Justice of the Connecticut Supreme Court from 1985 to 2000

- Born: June 3, 1930; Norwalk, Connecticut, U.S.
- Died: January 1, 2013 (aged 82); Norwalk, Connecticut, U.S.
- Education: Boston College; Fordham University School of Law
- Occupation: Chief Justice
- Organization: Connecticut Supreme Court

Robert Jeremiah Callahan (June 3, 1930 – January 1, 2013) was a justice of the Connecticut Supreme Court from 1985 to 2000. He had also served as Chief Justice from 1996 to 1999. He was born in Norwalk, Connecticut. He had served on the court since 1985. He was a graduate of Boston College and Fordham University School of Law. He died of Parkinson's disease on January 1, 2013, at age 82.

== Personal life ==
Robert's son, Patrick Callahan, was sworn in at the Connecticut State Capitol on Wednesday, January 6, 2021. Patrick serves as the State Representative for the 108th district: Danbury, New Fairfield, Sherman, and New Milford.

Political offices
Preceded by Leo Parskey	Justice of the Connecticut Supreme Court; 1985–2000	Succeeded by Christine S. Vertefeuille
