= Jesse Root =

American minister and judge (1736–1822)

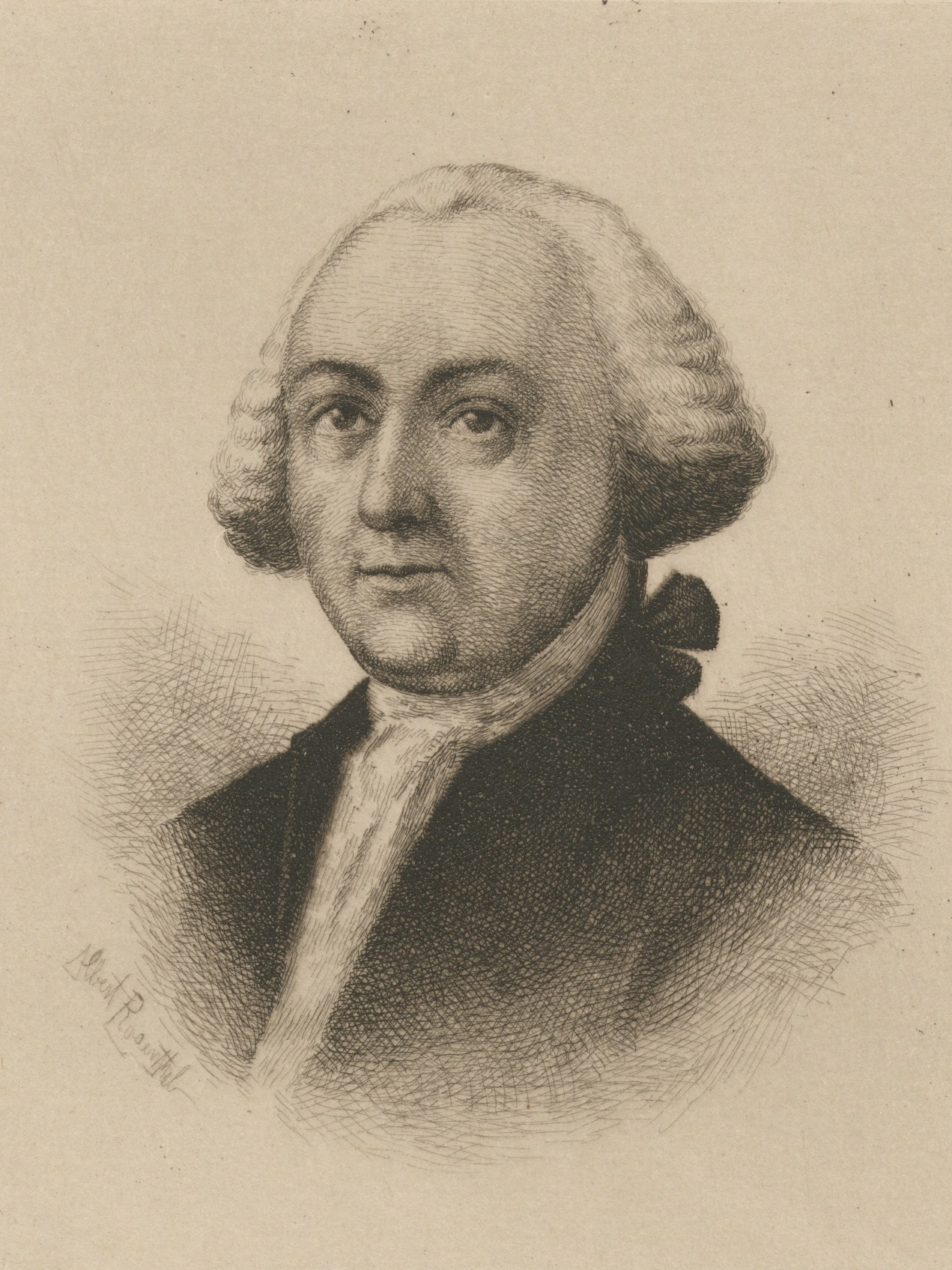
Jesse Root

Jesse Root (December 28, 1736 – March 29, 1822) was an American minister, Jurist, and lawyer from Coventry, Connecticut, who served in the American Revolutionary War. As a member of the Continental Congress he was the principal author of the congressional proclamation that established Thanksgiving Day as a national holiday.

== Early life and family ==
Root was born in Coventry, Connecticut, the eighth and youngest child of Ebenezer and Sarah (Strong) Root. His ancestors included Thomas Roote, who arrived in the colonies from England about 1637, settling in Hartford. He was educated in the common school of Coventry. After graduation he continued his education at the College of New Jersey, known today as Princeton University, and graduated in 1756. His grandson was Austin Cornelius Dunham, a prominent American industrialist.

== Career ==
During the American Revolution Root served on the Connecticut Council of Safety and in the Connecticut militia. Originally appointed as a lieutenant colonel in Peekskill in 1777, he rose to the rank of Adjutant-General of the Connecticut Line. He was a delegate to the Continental Congress for Connecticut from 1778 until 1782, and sat as chief justice of the Connecticut Supreme Court from 1796 to 1807 as well as a state court judge. He served in the Connecticut House of Representatives and served in the Connecticut Constitutional Convention. He was also a member of the First Company, Governor's Foot Guard, serving as its commandant between May 1798 and October 1802. Root graduated from Princeton while its founder, Governor Jonathan Belcher (1682-1757) was governor of New Jersey, (1746-1757).

Root was present, along with Benedict Arnold and Ethan Allen during the Capture of Fort Ticonderoga on May 10, 1775. The fort was of strategic importance and its armament and supplies were urgently needed to aid colonial forces in their effort to recapture Boston. Plans to take the fort were conducted in Hartford, Connecticut with information supplied by Benedict Arnold. The Connecticut Committee of Correspondence acted on this information; money was "borrowed" from the provincial coffers and recruiters were sent into northwestern Connecticut, western Massachusetts, and the New Hampshire Grants (now Vermont) to raise volunteers for an attack on the fort. With only a nominal garrison present, who were caught by surprise in the early morning, the fort was easily overwhelmed and captured with no casualties on either side.

In 1779 Root served as the Delegate from Connecticut in the Second Continental Congress. He was the principal author of the congressional proclamation that established Thanksgiving Day as a national holiday. The proclamation was included in General Washington's General Orders, issued at West Point, Saturday, November 27, 1779, directing his officers and men to observe Thursday, December 18, 1777, as a day for thanksgiving.

== Final Days ==
Jesse Root died at the age of 85 in his home at Coventry after a brief illness, and is buried in the Nathan Hale Memorial Cemetery in Coventry.

== Sources ==
- Flick, Stephen (2025). "October 20, 1779: Congress Proclaims Thanksgiving Day". Christian Heritage Fellowship, Inc.
- Ford, Worthington Chauncey, ed. (1904). "Thanksgiving proclamation". Journals of the Continental Congress, 1774-1789. v. 18: 809–1270.
- Land, William G. (1943). Jesse Root. Vol. XVI. Dictionary of American Biography. pp. 148–149.
- Randall, William Sterne (1990). Benedict Arnold. New york: William Morrow & Co.
- Trumbull, James Hammond (1886). The memorial history of Hartford County, Connecticut, 1633-1884. Vol. I. Edward L. Osgood.
- Ward, Christopher (1952). The War of the Revolution. New York: Macmillan. ISBN 1-56852-576-1. OCLC 425995.
- Washington, George (1937). Fitzpatrick, John C. (ed.). The Writings of George Washington. Vol. 17. U.S. Government Printing Office Dictionary of American Biography.
