= Simeon Baldwin =

American judge (1761 – 1851)

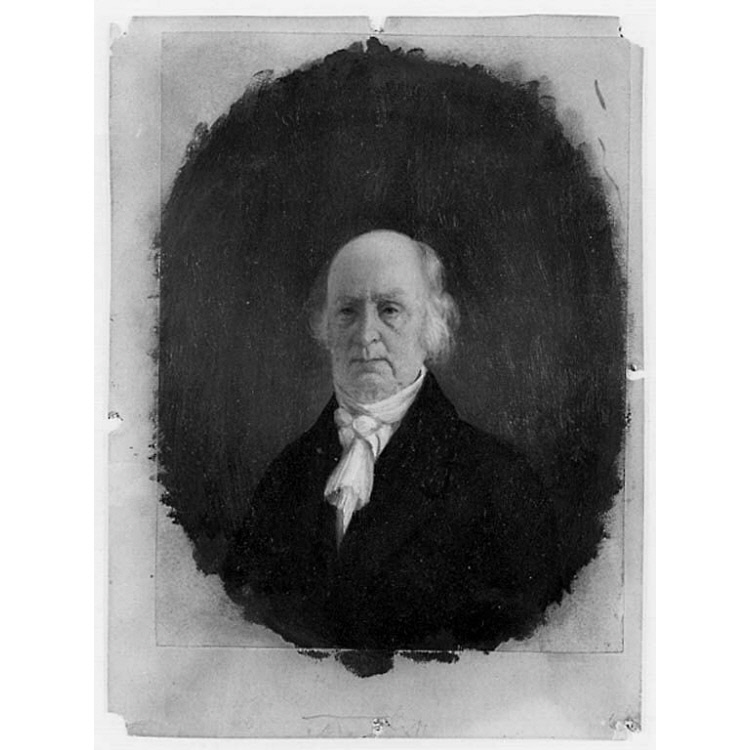

Member of the U.S. House of Representatives from Connecticut's at-large congressional district
- In office March 4, 1803 – March 3, 1805
- Preceded by: Elias Perkins
- Succeeded by: Jonathan O. Moseley

Personal details
- Born: December 14, 1761 Norwich, Connecticut Colony, British America
- Died: May 26, 1851 (aged 89) New Haven, Connecticut, U.S.
- Party: Federalist
- Education: Yale College

Simeon Baldwin (December 14, 1761 – May 26, 1851) was son-in-law of Roger Sherman, father of Connecticut Governor and US Senator Roger Sherman Baldwin, grandfather of Connecticut Governor & Chief Justice Simeon E. Baldwin and great-grandfather of New York Supreme Court Justice Edward Baldwin Whitney. He was born in Norwich in the Connecticut Colony. He completed preparatory studies (studying with Rev. Joseph Huntington and later at the Master Tisdale's School in Lebanon, Connecticut, and graduated from Yale College in 1781. He delivered the Latin oration in June 1782; it is still preserved in the Yale University Library. He was preceptor of the academy at Albany, and a Tutor at his alma mater.

== Career ==
He then studied law, was admitted to the bar, and commenced practice in New Haven. He was elected New Haven city clerk in 1790 was appointed clerk of the District and Circuit Courts of the United States for the District of Connecticut and served until November 1803, when he resigned, having been elected to Congress. Baldwin was elected as a Federalist to the Eighth Congress (March 4, 1803 – March 3, 1805).

He declined to be a candidate for reelection, and was again appointed to his former clerkship, but was removed by Judge Edwards in 1806. He served as associate judge of the Superior Court (1806–08) and the Connecticut Supreme Court of Errors (1808–18). He was president of the board of commissioners that located the Farmington Canal, and was Mayor of New Haven. He died at 89 years old and was interred at Grove Street Cemetery.

== Personal life ==
He married Rebecca, daughter of Hon. Roger Sherman, who died on September 4, 1795, and then married her sister Elizabeth Sherman Burr.

Political offices
Preceded by George Hoadley	Mayors of New Haven, Connecticut; 1826	Succeeded by William Bristol
Preceded by Court reconfigured	Justice of the Connecticut Supreme Court; 1808–1818	Succeeded by Asa Chapman
U.S. House of Representatives
Preceded by Elias Perkins	Member of the U.S. House of Representatives from Connecticut's at-large congressional district 1803–1805	Succeeded by Jonathan O. Moseley
