= Frank D. Haines =

American judge (1866–1959)

Frank D. Haines (January 16, 1866 – January 20, 1959) was a justice of the Connecticut Supreme Court from 1925 to 1936.

Born in Colchester, Connecticut, to David Haines and Amanda Taylor Haines, he was raised on a farm and attended Bacon Academy in that city. In 1883, he moved to Middletown, Connecticut, and worked as a bookkeeper until 1890, when he began to study law. Haines "studied in the law office of M. Eugene Culver for two years and then persuaded Dean Francis Wayland to permit him to enrol as a senior in Yale Law School, from which Haines graduated in 1893. from which he graduated in 1893.

Haines entered into a partnership with Culver until 1895, when he became executive secretary to Governor Owen Vincent Coffin, until 1897. He returned to the practice of law, including periods as Middlesex County liquor prosecutor, and state's attorney. Haines served on the Superior court from 1918 to 1925, when he was elected to the Supreme Court by a unanimous vote of the General Assembly on February 19, 1925.

Haines died in Middlesex Memorial Hospital in Middletown at the age of 92, after a lengthy illness.

Political offices
Preceded by John K. Beach	Justice of the Connecticut Supreme Court; 1925–1936	Succeeded by Allyn L. Brown
