= Barry R. Schaller =

American judge

Associate justice of the Connecticut Supreme Court
- In office 2007–2008

Barry R. Schaller (1938–2017) was an associate justice of the Connecticut Supreme Court from 2007 to 2008. He served as a judge of the Connecticut Appellate Court from 1992 to 2007. Before that, he was a trial court judge in Connecticut for 18 years. A graduate of Yale University and the Yale Law School, he was a visiting lecturer in public policy at Trinity College where he taught bioethics, public health law and ethics, health policy, and public policy and law. He was a clinical visiting lecturer at the Yale Law School, where he taught appellate practice and procedure. He also had appointments as visiting lecturer at Wesleyan University, where he taught bioethics and public health law, ethics and policy, and at the University of Connecticut School of Public Health. Justice Schaller also taught an appellate advocacy class at Yale Law School, focusing on Connecticut appellate procedure. Justice Schaller was a former chair of the Connecticut Board of Pardons, a charter life member of the Connecticut Bar Foundation, a member of the American Law Institute, and chair of the Connecticut Judicial Ethics Advisory Committee. In May, 2008, he was awarded an honorary Doctor of Laws degree by Quinnipiac University School of Law.

As a bioethicist with respect to health and ethics policy, he served on the Middlesex Hospital Bioethics Committee. He previously served for many years on the St. Francis Hospital Institutional Review Board. He participated in the Yale University Interdisciplinary Center on Bioethics. Justice Schaller lectured and written extensively in the field of ethics and judicial ethics, neuroscience and law, mental health and the law, state and federal constitutional law, jurisprudence, bioethics, American and comparative literature, conflict resolution, and public policy. He wrote numerous articles and a trilogy of books on the role of law in American society. His first book, A Vision of American Law: Judging Law, Literature, and the Stories We Tell, which addresses law, literature, and American cultural issues, was widely reviewed and received the Quinnipiac Law School award for excellence. His next book, Understanding Bioethics and Law: The Promises and Perils of the Brave New World of Biotechnology was published in November, 2007. His recent book, Veterans on Trial: The Coming Court Battles Over PTSD was published in June, 2012. Justice Schaller was a frequent speaker on the problems of soldiers and veterans who suffer from post-traumatic stress disorder and the impact of such problems on American society, and the courts, in particular. He was interviewed frequently in print and on public radio shows on subjects ranging from mental health problems of veterans to the cultural and societal consequences of the recent wars. This research inspired him to turn to legal fiction, writing his first novel, The Ramadi Affair, published in 2016. This involves a Connecticut judge, a decorated veteran of Iraq, thrust onto the national stage when the press learns that he is up for an unexpected vacancy on the U.S. Supreme Court.

Justice Schaller continued his writing and his judicial work as a judge trial referee by hearing arguments at the Connecticut Appellate Court and mediating cases within the court system until his passing. After suffering from a rare form of leukemia, he died in September 2017.
