= David Torrance (judge) =

American judge

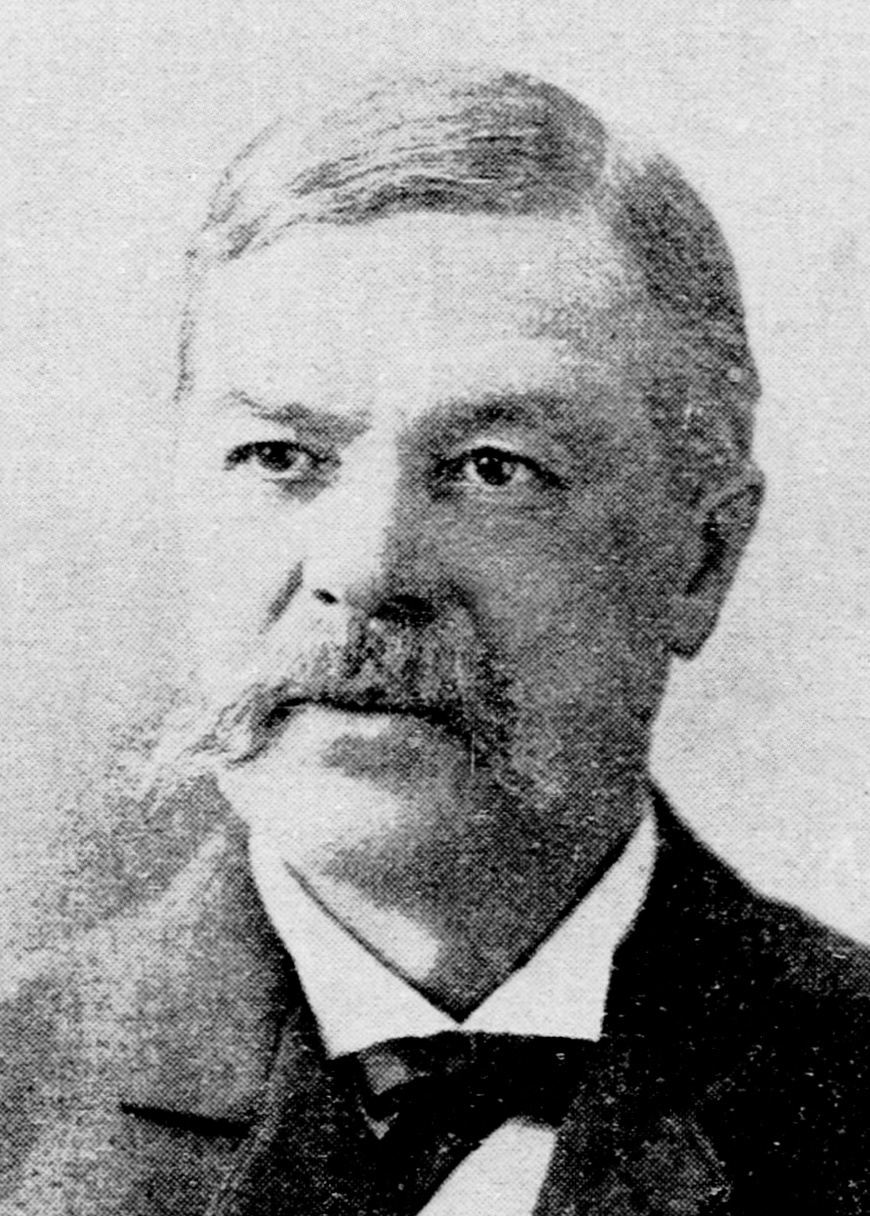

Chief Justice of the Connecticut Supreme Court of Errors
- In office 1901–1906
- Appointed by: George P. McLean
- Preceded by: Charles B. Andrews
- Succeeded by: Simeon E. Baldwin

Secretary of the State of Connecticut
- In office January 9, 1879 – January 5, 1881
- Governor: Charles B. Andrews
- Preceded by: Dwight Morris
- Succeeded by: Charles E. Searls

Personal details
- Born: March 3, 1840 Edinburgh, Scotland
- Died: September 5, 1906 (aged 66) Derby, Connecticut, U.S.
- Party: Republican
- Spouse: Annie France (m. 1864)
- Children: 3

Military service
- Branch/service: United States Army (Union)
- Years of service: 1862–1865
- Rank: Lieutenant colonel
- Battles/wars: American Civil War

David Torrance (March 3, 1840 – September 5, 1906) was a soldier, lawyer, politician, and chief justice of the Supreme Court in Connecticut.

Torrance was born in Edinburgh, Scotland on March 3, 1840. Torrance's widowed mother emigrated to the United States in 1849 with her five children, settling in Norwich, Connecticut. Torrance worked in cotton and paper mills to support his family, receiving little formal education. In 1862 he enlisted in the Union army as a private, but he rapidly rose in rank. He was captured at the Second Battle of Winchester and spent time in Libby Prison, but was soon paroled. In January 1864 he was commissioned a captain in the 29th Regiment U.S. Colored Troops, commanded by William B. Wooster, a lawyer in New Haven. By the end of the war Torrance was lieutenant colonel under Wooster.

Torrance began to study law under Wooster during the war, and moved to Derby after the war to study law with him. In 1868 they formed the lawfirm of Wooster & Torrance and remained in practice with each other until Torrance became a judge in 1885.

Torrance represented Derby in the General Assembly in 1871 and 1872. In 1879 he was elected Secretary of State, serving until 1881. In 1881 he was appointed Judge of Common Pleas in New Haven County; in 1885 he was appointed to the Superior Court, and in 1889 to the Supreme Court. He was appointed Chief Justice in 1901 and served until his death in 1906.

He was awarded an honorary M.A. by Yale in 1883; he became a law school instructor there in 1893 and a professor in 1898.

Torrance married Annie France in 1864; they had three children.

Political offices
Preceded by Dwight Morris	Secretary of the State of Connecticut; 1879–1881	Succeeded by Charles E. Searls
