= Erastus Wolcott =

American politician, soldier, and judge (1797–1793)

Justice of Connecticut Supreme Court
- In office 1789–1792

Personal details
- Born: September 21, 1722 Windsor, Connecticut, US
- Died: September 14, 1793 (aged 70) South Windsor, Connecticut
- Relations: Oliver Wolcott (brother); Matthew Griswold (brother-in-law)
- Parent(s): Roger Wolcott & Sarah Drake
- Occupation: Politician, judge, general

Erastus Wolcott (September 21, 1722 – September 14, 1793) was an American politician and a Connecticut state militia commander during the American Revolutionary War. He served in the Connecticut General Assembly for over twenty years and was a justice of the Connecticut Supreme Court from 1789 to 1792.

== Early life and family ==
Wolcott was born on September 21, 1722, in Windsor, Connecticut, to parents Roger Wolcott and Sarah Drake. Little is known of his early life or education. The Wolcotts were a prominent family in one of the largest and wealthiest towns in Connecticut. Roger Wolcott was colonial governor of Connecticut between 1751 and 1754. Erastus’s brother-in-law, Matthew Griswold, was Connecticut governor from 1784 to 1786 and his younger brother, Oliver Wolcott, served as lieutenant governor of Connecticut from 1787 to 1795 and governor from 1796 to his death in 1797.

== Political career ==
Erastus Wolcott served in the Connecticut General Assembly in 1758 to 1762, returning as representative of the newly formed town of East Windsor in 1768. In May 1773 he was named to the colony's committee of correspondence, which selected him as a delegate to the First Continental Congress in 1774, though he refused to serve outside Connecticut. He was also appointed to the Constitutional Convention (United States) in 1787 but again refused the appointment. In May 1776 he was elected Speaker of the Assembly. From May 1778 through March 1779 he advised on the war effort as a Council of Safety member. Following the war, Wolcott served on the Council of Assistants from 1786 through 1789. During the Confederation Period, he advocated for Connecticut's interests but voted in favor of ratifying the Constitution in 1788.

In October 1789 Wolcott accepted appointment to the Connecticut Supreme Court, resigning due to ill health in 1792. He had been a longtime justice of the peace for East Windsor and neighboring Ellington. In 1790, he received an honorary degree from Yale College.

== Military career ==
Concurrent with his legislative service, Wolcott rose through the ranks of the colonial militia. He became a major in October 1762 and colonel in 1774. In 1775, he accompanied William Samuel Johnson to Boston to treat with General Thomas Gage. Early the following year, he led a regiment of militia to reinforce George Washington's army besieging Gage's army in Boston. In July he moved to New London, commanding a state militia regiment and strengthening fortifications at Fort Griswold and Fort Trumbull. In December 1776 he became brigadier general of the first brigade in Connecticut's reorganized militia. Wolcott served primarily in an administrative capacity, recruiting, marching, and supplying the troops. From April to June 1777 he personally commanded a detachment stationed on the Hudson River in Peekskill, New York. He resigned his commission in January 1781 in protest over Governor Jonathan Trumbull's direction of the war effort.

== Personal life ==
Wolcott married Jerusha Wolcott on February 10, 1746. They had seven children, five of whom survived him. Wolcott died in South Windsor on September 14, 1793, at the age of 70, one week shy of his 71st birthday.
