= Samuel Church =

American judge

Samuel Church (born Salisbury, Connecticut, February 4, 1785; died September 13, 1854) was a lawyer, politician, and chief justice of the Connecticut Supreme Court.

Church graduated from Yale University in 1803 and then studied law, being admitted in 1806. In 1808 he returned to Salisbury to open a practice and remained a resident there for the rest of his life. In 1818 he was a member of the Connecticut constitutional convention. Between 1821 and 1831 he spent 5 years as a representative in the assembly and 3 as a state senator. He also served as a probate judge and as the State's Attorney for Litchfield County. He resigned these offices in 1832 when he was appointed as a superior court judge. In January 1833 he was appointed to the Connecticut Supreme Court. He became chief justice in 1847 and held that position until his death in 1854.

St. John's Episcopal Church in Salisbury has a stained glass window dedicated to Church.

Church's son Albert E. Church (1807–1878) became a mathematics professor at West Point and authored a number of textbooks.
