= John Duane Park =

American judge

John Duane Park (born Preston, Connecticut, April 26, 1819; died Norwich, Connecticut, August 4, 1896) was a lawyer, judge, and chief justice of the Connecticut Supreme Court.

Park was admitted to the bar in 1847 and opened a practice in Norwich. In 1854 he was selected by the General Assembly to be judge of the New London County court. He became a judge of the Connecticut Supreme Court in 1864 and in 1874 he was advanced to Chief Justice, a post he held until he was forced by law to retire at age 70 in 1889. Upon his retirement the General Assembly created the office of State Referee for him in order to retain his services.

In 1878 he received an honorary Doctorate of Laws from Yale.

Park married Emma W. Allen in 1864; they had one child, who died in infancy.
