= José A. Suarez =

American judge (born 1965/66)

Judge of the Connecticut Appellate Court
- Incumbent
- Assumed office August 20, 2020
- Appointed by: Ned Lamont
- Preceded by: Christine Keller

Judge of the Connecticut Superior Court
- In office 2009 – August 20, 2020
- Appointed by: M. Jodi Rell

Personal details
- Born: 1965 or 1966 (age 59–60) San Juan, Puerto Rico
- Education: University of Dayton (BA); University of Connecticut School of Law (JD)

José Antonio Suarez (born 1965 or 1966) is a judge for the Connecticut Appellate Court.

== Education ==
Suarez received a Bachelor of Arts degree from the University of Dayton in 1989 and a Juris Doctor from the University of Connecticut School of Law in 1993.

== Career ==
Before joining the bench, he held multiple positions within the Office of the Connecticut Attorney General.

=== Connecticut superior court ===
Suarez was appointed to the superior court by Governor M. Jodi Rell in 2009. His service terminated in state court in August 2020 once he was sworn in as a judge of the Connecticut Appellate Court.

=== Connecticut Appellate Court ===
On July 20, 2020, Governor Ned Lamont announced the appointment of Suarez to the Connecticut Appellate Court to the seat being vacated by Judge Christine Keller who was elevated to the Connecticut Supreme Court. He was sworn into office on August 12, 2020.

== Personal life ==
Suarez was born in Puerto Rico and moved to Connecticut with his family at the age of 11.

== See also ==
- List of Hispanic and Latino American jurists

Legal offices
Preceded by Christine Keller	Judge of the Connecticut Appellate Court; 2020–present	Incumbent
