= Douglas Lavine =

American judge from Connecticut

Douglas S. Lavine

Judge of the Connecticut Appellate Court
- Incumbent
- Assumed office February 2006
- Appointed by: Jodi Rell

Judge of the Connecticut Superior Court
- In office 1993 – February 2006
- Appointed by: Lowell P. Weicker Jr.

Personal details
- Born: Douglas Steven Lavine; December 9, 1950 (age 75)
- Education: Colgate University (B.A.); Columbia University Graduate School of Journalism (M.A.); University of Connecticut School of Law (J.D.); Columbia Law School (LL.M)

Douglas Steven Lavine (born December 9, 1950) is a Judge of the Connecticut Appellate Court.

== Education ==
Lavine graduated from Colgate University in 1972 with a degree in history. He then earned a master's degree in journalism from the Columbia University Graduate School of Journalism. After he received his Juris Doctor from the University of Connecticut School of Law in 1977, he earned a Master of Laws from Columbia Law School in 1981. Lavine worked as a newspaper reporter and editor prior to his legal career.

== Journalism and legal careers ==
He was a reporter and editor for various newspapers before entering into his legal career. He worked in the Litigation Department of the Hartford law firm of Shipman & Goodwin from 1981 to 1986. He served as an Assistant United States Attorney from 1986 to 1993. In 1993, Governor Lowell P. Weicker Jr. appointed him to be a Superior Court judge. He was reappointed by Governor John G. Rowland in 2001. In February 2006, he was elevated to the Connecticut Appellate Court by Governor Jodi Rell. He was most recently renominated by Governor Dan Malloy and confirmed by the Connecticut General Assembly for another eight-year term, expiring on March 14, 2022.

== Teaching ==
He has taught as an adjunct professor at the University of Connecticut School of Law and Quinnipiac University School of Law.

== Personal life ==
A resident of West Hartford, Lavine is the author of two books on advocacy. His wife, Lucretia, is a social worker and his daughter, Julia, also a graduate of the University of Connecticut School of Law, is a practicing lawyer in Hartford.
