= Robert J. Devlin Jr. =

American judge (born 1950)

Judge of the Connecticut Appellate Court
- In office May 15, 2019 – April 2020
- Appointed by: Ned Lamont
- Preceded by: Michael Sheldon
- Succeeded by: Melanie L. Cradle

Judge of the Connecticut Superior Court
- In office 1993–2019
- Appointed by: Lowell P. Weicker Jr.

Personal details
- Born: 1950 (age 75–76)
- Education: Southern Connecticut State University (B.A.); University of Connecticut (J.D.)

Robert J. Devlin Jr. is a former Judge of the Connecticut Appellate Court and former Judge of the Connecticut Superior Court. He was nominated to the Appellate court by Governor Ned Lamont and began his term on May 15, 2019. Devlin retired in April 2020, after reaching the mandatory retirement age of 70.

== Education ==
Devlin earned a Bachelor of Arts from Southern Connecticut State University and is an honors graduate of the University of Connecticut School of Law.

== Early career ==
Devlin began his career by working as a public defender and in private practice, then working for nine years as a prosecutor. From 1988–1992 he was an Assistant United States Attorney.

== Superior Court service ==
He was nominated to the Superior Court in December 1992 by Lowell Weicker. As a superior court judge, Devlin presided over several notable criminal cases, including State v. Beth Carpenter, State v. Russell Peeler, and State v. Christopher DiMeo.

== Appellate Court service ==
On April 25, 2019, Governor Ned Lamont nominated Devlin to the seat vacated by Michael Sheldon who had reached the mandatory retirement age.

== Deputy Chief State's Attorney, Inspector General ==
In 2021 Devlin was appointed Deputy Chief State's Attorney, Inspector General, responsible for leading Connecticut's Office of Inspector General. In March 2024, he attempted to "race bait" a jury during the trial of Connecticut State Trooper Brian North, stating that the case was a "A white Police Officer who shot and killed a black man. This is a very, very, big deal". Race was never an argument in the case besides his closing argument to the jury.
