= Michael Sheldon (jurist) =

American judge from Connecticut

Michael R. Sheldon

Judge of the Connecticut Appellate Court
- In office October 20, 2011 – April 1, 2019
- Appointed by: Dan Malloy
- Succeeded by: Robert J. Devlin Jr.

Judge of the Connecticut Superior Court
- In office 1991 – October 20, 2011
- Appointed by: Lowell P. Weicker Jr.

Personal details
- Born: April 6, 1949 (age 76)
- Education: Princeton University (A.B.); Yale Law School (J.D.)

Michael R. Sheldon (born April 6, 1949) was a Judge of the Connecticut Appellate Court. He stepped down on April 1, 2019, shortly before reaching the mandatory retirement age of 70 years.

== Education ==
Sheldon earned his Bachelor of Arts in Public and International Affairs and a Certificate of Proficiency in Russian Studies from Princeton University in 1971 and his Juris Doctor from Yale Law School in 1974.

== Legal career ==
Sheldon participated in the E. Barrett Prettyman Legal Internship Program at the Georgetown University Law Center. In that capacity, he was trained in criminal trial and appellate advocacy while supervising upper-class law students in the representation of criminal defendants in the Law Center's Clinical Programs. In 1976, he was hired by the University of Connecticut School of Law as a professor of law and appointed director of the Criminal Clinic. He worked at the Law School until 1991, teaching courses in criminal law and procedure, establishing and operating the Moot Court Interterm Program, and training and supervising upper-class law students in the representation of criminal defendants in the Trial and Appellate Divisions of the Criminal Clinic.

== Superior court service ==
He was appointed to the Superior Court by Governor Lowell P. Weicker Jr. in 1991. In his 20 years of service as a Superior Court judge, his assignments included terms in the Civil and Criminal Divisions of the Hartford, New Britain and Litchfield Superior Courts, as well as a four-year term pioneering the Complex Litigation Docket in Waterbury.

== Appellate court service ==
He was nominated to the Connecticut Appellate Court by Governor Dan Malloy on October 20, 2011. Sheldon retired from the Appellate Court on April 1, 2019, shortly before reaching the mandatory retirement age of 70. He was succeeded by Judge Robert Devlin.
