= Eliot D. Prescott =

American judge (born 1965)

Judge of the Connecticut Appellate Court
- In office April 25, 2014 – October 10, 2023
- Appointed by: Dan Malloy
- Preceded by: Richard A. Robinson
- Succeeded by: Dawne G. Westbrook

Judge of the Connecticut Superior Court
- In office 2004 – April 25, 2014

Personal details
- Born: Eliot Dalton Prescott; January 21, 1965 (age 61) New Bedford, Massachusetts, U.S.
- Education: University of Massachusetts at Amherst (B.A.); University of Connecticut School of Law (J.D.)

Eliot Dalton Prescott (born January 21, 1965) is an American lawyer and former judge on the Connecticut Appellate Court.

== Education ==
Prescott was born on January 21, 1965, in New Bedford, Massachusetts. He earned his Bachelor of Arts in political science from the University of Massachusetts at Amherst in 1988. He received his Juris Doctor from the University of Connecticut School of Law in 1992, graduating with high honors.

== Legal career ==
After graduating law school, Prescott served as the law clerk to the Honorable David M. Borden on the Connecticut Supreme Court. He also worked as an associate in the Washington, D.C. office of the law firm Fulbright & Jaworski.

In 1994, he returned to Connecticut where he served as an Assistant Attorney General in the Office of the Attorney General. In 2001, he became the Department Head of the Special Litigation Department within the Office of the Attorney General, where he supervised lawyers, accountants, paralegals and other support staff. During his tenure as an Assistant Attorney General, he represented the State of Connecticut in complex litigation matters in state and federal court, and argued more than 25 appeals in the Connecticut Supreme Court, Appellate Court and the United States Court of Appeals for the Second Circuit.

From 1998 to 2015, he was an Adjunct Professor of Law at the University of Connecticut School of Law, where he taught administrative law.

== Appointment to state appellate court ==
On March 14, 2014, Governor Dan Malloy nominated Prescott to fill the vacancy created by Richard A. Robinson's appointment to the Connecticut Supreme Court in late 2013. Prescott's nomination was approved by the Connecticut General Assembly on April 25, 2014. He took senior status on October 10, 2023.
