= Ingrid L. Moll =

Judge of the Connecticut Appellate Court

Ingrid Lynn Moll

Judge of the Connecticut Appellate Court
- Incumbent
- Assumed office May 3, 2018
- Appointed by: Dan Malloy

Judge of the Connecticut Superior Court
- In office 2014 – May 3, 2018
- Appointed by: Dan Malloy

Personal details
- Born: April 17, 1973 (age 52)
- Education: Wheaton College (BA); University of Connecticut (JD)

Ingrid Lynn Moll (born April 17, 1973) is an American lawyer who has served as a judge of the Connecticut Appellate Court since 2018.

== Biography ==
Moll earned her Bachelor of Arts in Political Science and French in 1995 from Wheaton College. She subsequently received her Juris Doctor from the University of Connecticut School of Law in 1999. While in law school, Moll served as Editor-in-Chief of the Connecticut Law Review.

Moll has worked at Motley Rice, McCarter & English, and Cummings & Lockwood, LLC. She has been recognized for excellence in environmental litigation.

=== State court service ===
Moll was appointed to the Superior Court by Governor Dan Malloy in 2014. She was nominated to the Connecticut Appellate Court by Governor Dan Malloy on May 3, 2018. Her current term expires in 2026.
