= Melanie L. Cradle =

American judge from Connecticut

Melanie Cradle

Associate Justice of the Connecticut Supreme Court
- Incumbent
- Assumed office August 5, 2026
- Appointed by: Ned Lamont
- Preceded by: Joan K. Alexander

Chief Judge of the Connecticut Appellate Court
- In office March 5, 2025 – August 5, 2026
- Appointed by: Raheem L. Mullins
- Preceded by: William H. Bright Jr.
- Succeeded by: Robert Clark

Judge of the Connecticut Appellate Court
- In office August 2020 – August 5, 2026
- Appointed by: Ned Lamont
- Preceded by: Robert J. Devlin Jr.
- Succeeded by: Glen Pierson

Personal details
- Born: 1970 or 1971 (age 55–56)
- Education: Adelphi University (BA); Seton Hall University (JD)

Melanie L. Cradle (born 1970/1971) is an American judge who currently serves as an associate justice of the Connecticut Supreme Court. She previously served as the chief judge of the Connecticut Appellate Court.

== Education ==
Cradle earned her bachelor's degree from Adelphi University in 1993, and her Juris Doctor from Seton Hall University School of Law in 1998.

== Judicial career ==
=== Connecticut Superior Court ===
Cradle was appointed to the superior court by Governor Dannel Malloy in 2013. She has heard criminal cases in Bridgeport for a year before moving to the New Haven Judicial District in 2014. In 2015, she became the presiding judge in GA 23 in New Haven. Cradle also serves on the Law Library Advisory Committee, the Rules Committee of the Superior Court, and the Criminal Justice Commission.

=== Connecticut Appellate Court ===
On July 20, 2020, Governor Ned Lamont announced the appointment of Cradle to the Connecticut Appellate Court to the seat being vacated by Judge Robert J. Devlin Jr. who reached mandatory retirement age in April 2020. Upon her appointment, Judge Cradle became the first African-American woman to serve on the Appellate Court. She was appointed as chief judge in March 2025.

=== Connecticut Supreme Court ===
On June 15, 2026, Governor Lamont announced the appointment of Cradle to the Connecticut Supreme Court to the seat being vacated by Justice Joan K. Alexander, who is resigning to focus on her role as Chief Court Administrator. If confirmed, Cradle would become the first African-American woman to serve on the Connecticut Supreme Court. Cradle was confirmed by the Judiciary Committee of the Connecticut General Assembly on August 5, 2026, allowing her to take office in an interim capacity before confirmation by the full Assembly.

== Memberships ==
Cradle has served as a member of the National College of District Attorneys, the National Association of Black Prosecutors, the Ansonia/Milford Multidisciplinary Team, and the State of Connecticut Division of Criminal Justice Diversity Committee. She was also a mentor for the Lawyers Collaborative for Diversity.

== Personal ==
At her original confirmation hearing, Cradle noted that her parents married in 1967, the year when the U.S. Supreme Court struck down laws prohibiting interracial marriage in Loving v. Virginia, the state where her father lived before entering the U.S. Army. Her parents met while her father was a serviceman overseas.

Legal offices
Preceded by Joan K. Alexander	Associate Justice of the Connecticut Supreme Court; 2026–present	Incumbent
