= Dennis G. Eveleigh =

American judge

Associate Justice of the Connecticut Supreme Court
- In office June 1, 2010 – 2017
- Appointed by: Jodi Rell
- Preceded by: Christine S. Vertefeuille
- Succeeded by: Raheem L. Mullins

Judge of the Waterbury District Superior Court
- In office October 1, 1998 – June 1, 2010
- Appointed by: John G. Rowland

Personal details
- Born: Dennis Gene Eveleigh; October 2, 1947 (age 78) Stamford, Connecticut, U.S.
- Spouse(s): Marian (? - died 2001); Carol A. Wolven
- Education: Wittenberg University (AB); University of Connecticut (JD)
- Occupation: lawyer, judge

Military service
- Branch/service: United States Army
- Years of service: 1972–1980
- Rank: First Lieutenant

Dennis Gene Eveleigh (born October 2, 1947) is an American lawyer and former justice of the Connecticut Supreme Court.

== Early life ==
Eveleigh graduated from Rippowam High School in Stamford in 1965. While in high school he played baseball, football and basketball.

== Military service ==
Eveleigh served in the United States Army from 1972 to 1980, reaching the rank of First Lieutenant.

== Education and sports ==
Eveleigh graduated from Wittenberg University in 1969 with a Bachelor of Arts in political science and the University of Connecticut School of Law in 1972 with a Juris Doctor. While at law school, Eveleigh was a contributor to the Connecticut Law Review. While attending Wittenberg, he played baseball and was on Ohio Conference Champion teams in 1966 and 1968. He played on the 1966 Stamford American Legion Oscar Cowen Post No. 3 baseball team. After the 1966 season, he tried out for the Pittsburgh Pirates, but reoccurring muscle injuries kept him off the field.

He played baseball in the Stamford Twilight League under coach Bobby Attanasio.

He also holds an Honorary Doctor of Laws degree from Quinnipiac University.

== Legal career ==
He served as a trial counsel at Goldstein & Peck, a law firm in Bridgeport, Connecticut from 1972 to 1985. From 1985 to 1997, he practiced law in Stamford. He was appointed to the Waterbury District Superior Court by Governor John Rowland in 1998. In March 2010, he was nominated to serve on the Connecticut Supreme Court by Governor Mary Rell. He was later confirmed by the state legislature and took the oath of office on June 1, 2010.

He retired from the Connecticut Supreme Court in 2017 after reaching the mandatory retirement age of 70.

He still hears cases in the Connecticut Appellate Court as a retired judge.

== Personal life and other activities ==
Eveleigh's first wife Marian died in 2001 from cancer. He later married Carol A. Wolven who is a Bridgeport Superior Court Judge. They have three grown children and two stepchildren.

He served as Vice-President and acting President during his 25 years on the board of the Stamford Youth Soccer League and founded the Girls Soccer Division of the organization.

He was the first president of North Stamford Little League baseball.
