= Joseph P. Flynn =

Connecticut Appellate Court
- Incumbent
- Assumed office February 7, 2001
- Nominated by: John G. Rowland

Personal details
- Born: Derby, Connecticut, U.S.

Joseph P. Flynn (born in Derby, Connecticut) was the Chief Judge of the Connecticut Appellate Court. Flynn was appointed judge of the Connecticut Appellate Court on February 7, 2001 and Chief Judge on February 1, 2006. Judge Flynn subsequently assumed in 2010 and Judge Alexandra DiPentima succeeded him. Judge Flynn continued to sit as a Senior Judge until attaining Age 70, whereupon he became a Judge Trial Referee.

== Career ==
Flynn served in the U.S. Marine Corps Reserve and the Judge Advocate General's Corps of the U.S. Naval Reserve. Flynn was in a private law practice in Ansonia for almost 20 years. He also served as a Connecticut State Senator from the 17th District from 1975 to 1979.

In 1985, Governor William A. O'Neill first appointed Judge Flynn to the bench. He sat in all of the Superior courts of Fairfield and New Haven Counties on criminal and civil jury and court cases and served as Assistant Administrative Judge in Waterbury in 1988 and as Assistant Administrative Judge in the Ansonia/Milford District in 1997. Named Administrative Judge in 1998, he served until his appointment as Deputy Chief Court Administrator in 1999.

== Education ==
Flynn received his bachelor's degree from Fairfield University and his law degree from the Georgetown University Law Center.
