= Joan K. Alexander =

American judge (born 1961 or 1962)

Joan Alexander

Associate Justice of the Connecticut Supreme Court
- In office April 30, 2022 – August 1, 2026
- Appointed by: Ned Lamont
- Preceded by: Christine Keller
- Succeeded by: Melanie L. Cradle

Personal details
- Born: 1961 or 1962 (age 64–65)
- Education: Yale University (BA); University of Connecticut (JD)

Joan Kulowski Alexander (born 1961 or 1962) is a former associate justice of the Connecticut Supreme Court. She served as a judge at the Connecticut Appellate Court from 2020 to 2022.

== Early life and education ==
Alexander earned her Bachelor of Science from Yale University in 1984, and her Juris Doctor from the University of Connecticut School of Law in 1987.

== Legal career ==
Prior to joining the bench, Alexander was a prosecutor with the Connecticut Division of Criminal Justice. She was assigned to the Waterbury and Hartford State's Attorneys offices, and then became supervisor of the Statewide Prosecution Bureau. During her time as prosecutor, she handled numerous homicide and arson cases.

== Judicial career ==
=== Connecticut Superior Court ===
Alexander was appointed to the superior court by Governor John G. Rowland in 2000.

=== Connecticut Appellate Court ===
On July 20, 2020, Governor Ned Lamont announced the appointment of Alexander to the Connecticut Appellate Court to the seat being vacated by Judge Alexandra Davis DiPentima took senior status on July 31, 2020. She was succeeded by Hope Seeley.

=== Connecticut Supreme Court ===
On April 13, 2022, Governor Ned Lamont nominated Alexander to serve as an associate justice of the Connecticut Supreme Court, the seat vacated by to justice Christine Keller, who assumed senior status on March 31, 2022. On April 25, 2022, her nomination was reported out of committee. She was confirmed on April 29, 2022. On June 15, 2026, it was announced that Justice Alexander would resign effective August 1, 2026 to focus full-time on her role as Chief Court Administrator.

Legal offices
Preceded by Christine Keller	Associate Justice of the Connecticut Supreme Court; 2022–2026	Succeeded by Melanie L. Cradle
