= Timothy Fisher =

Timothy Fisher may refer to:

- Timothy S. Fisher, American educator, engineer and expert in the application of nanotechnologies
- Timothy Fisher (lawyer), dean emeritus and professor of law

== See also ==
- Tim Fischer, Australian politician and diplomat
- Tim Fischer (wrestler), American professional wrestler
