= Connecticut Law Review =

- Discipline: American law, general law
- Language: English

Publication details
- History: 1968–present
- Publisher: University of Connecticut School of Law (United States)
- Frequency: Quarterly

Standard abbreviations
- Bluebook: Conn. L. Rev.
- ISO 4: Conn. Law Rev.

Indexing
- ISSN: 0010-6151
- LCCN: sn82001609
- OCLC no.: 818986596

Links
- Journal homepage; Online access; Online archive

The Connecticut Law Review is a quarterly law review produced by students of the University of Connecticut School of Law. It publishes more than 1,000 pages of critical legal discussion each year and is managed entirely by a student board of editors. The journal was established in 1968. In 2025, the journal was ranked the 50th flagship law review in the United States.

== Abstracting and indexing ==
The journal is abstracted and indexed in EBSCO and ProQuest databases, as well as HeinOnline and Scopus (selected years only).

== Notable alumni ==
Notable alumni include:

- Christopher F. Droney, Circuit Judge of the United States Court of Appeals for the Second Circuit
- Dennis G. Eveleigh, Justice of the Connecticut Supreme Court
- Joan G. Margolis, United States Magistrate Judge for the District of Connecticut
- Ingrid L. Moll, Class of 1999, Judge of the Connecticut Appellate Court
- Thomas P. Smith, United States Magistrate Judge for the District of Connecticut
- Shauhin Talesh, professor, University of California, Irvine School of Law

== See also ==
- Connecticut Journal of International Law (est. 1985)
- Connecticut Insurance Law Journal (est. 1994)
- Connecticut Public Interest Law Journal (est. 2001)
