= Kari A. Dooley =

American judge (born 1963)

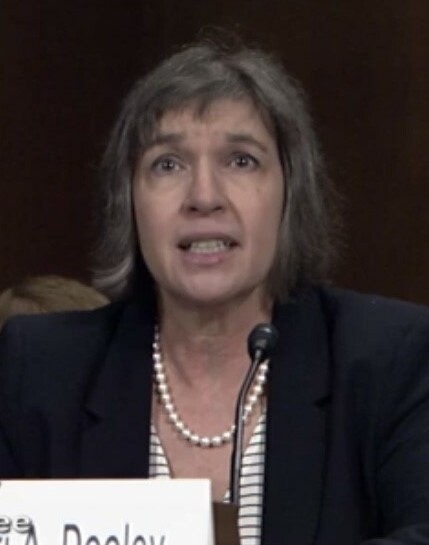

Judge of the United States District Court for the District of Connecticut
- Incumbent
- Assumed office September 13, 2018
- Appointed by: Donald Trump
- Preceded by: Robert Chatigny

Judge of the Connecticut Superior Court for the District of Waterbury
- In office 2004 – September 13, 2018
- Appointed by: Jodi Rell

Personal details
- Born: Kari Ann Pedersen; 1963 (age 62–63) New York City, U.S.
- Education: Cornell University (BA); University of Connecticut (JD)

Kari Anne Dooley (née Pederson; born 1963) is a United States district judge of the United States District Court for the District of Connecticut.

== Biography ==
Dooley received her Bachelor of Arts from Cornell University, and her Juris Doctor, cum laude, from the University of Connecticut School of Law.

She began her legal career as an associate in the Greenwich office of Whitman & Ransom. She served for twelve years as an Assistant United States Attorney for the District of Connecticut, rising to the rank of Supervisory Assistant United States Attorney and, ultimately, Counsel to the United States Attorney. From 2004 to 2018, she served as a Judge of the Connecticut Superior Court.

== Federal judicial service ==
On December 20, 2017, President Donald Trump nominated Dooley to serve as a United States District Judge of the United States District Court for the District of Connecticut, to the seat vacated by Judge Robert Chatigny, who assumed senior status on December 31, 2016. On March 7, 2018, a hearing on her nomination was held before the Senate Judiciary Committee. On April 19, 2018, her nomination was reported out of committee by a 19–2 vote. On September 6, 2018, her nomination was confirmed by voice vote. She received her judicial commission on September 13, 2018.

Legal offices
Preceded by Robert Chatigny	Judge of the United States District Court for the District of Connecticut; 2018–present	Incumbent
