= Jeremy Paul =

Jeremy Paul may refer to:

- Jeremy Paul (golfer), German golfer
- Jeremy Paul (rugby union), New Zealand-born Australian rugby union player
- Jeremy Paul (screenwriter), British film and television writer
- Jeremy R. Paul, dean of Northeastern University School of Law
