= Mark R. Kravitz =

American judge (1950–2012)

Mark Richard Kravitz
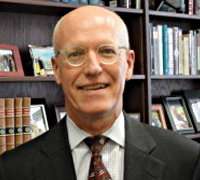

Judge of the United States District Court for the District of Connecticut
- In office June 12, 2003 – September 30, 2012
- Appointed by: George W. Bush
- Preceded by: Alfred V. Covello
- Succeeded by: Jeffrey A. Meyer

Personal details
- Born: Mark Richard Kravitz; June 21, 1950 Philadelphia, Pennsylvania, U.S.
- Died: September 30, 2012 (aged 62) Guilford, Connecticut, U.S.
- Spouse: Wendy Evans
- Education: Wesleyan University (BA); Georgetown University Law Center (JD)

Mark Richard Kravitz (June 21, 1950 – September 30, 2012) was a United States district judge of the United States District Court for the District of Connecticut.

== Early life and education ==
Kravitz was born in Philadelphia, Pennsylvania in 1950. After earning a Bachelor of Arts degree in 1972 from Wesleyan University (magna cum laude, Phi Beta Kappa), he received a Juris Doctor from Georgetown University Law Center in 1975, where he served as Managing Editor of the Georgetown Law Journal.

After graduating from law school, Kravitz served as a law clerk to Judge James Hunter III, Circuit Judge, of the United States Court of Appeals for the Third Circuit, and subsequently to then-justice (later chief justice) William Rehnquist, of the United States Supreme Court from 1978 to 1979.

== Career ==
Before his appointment to the federal bench, Kravitz was a partner at the Connecticut-based law firm of Wiggin and Dana, LLP, where his practice centered on appellate litigation. While in private practice, he argued cases before the U.S. Supreme Court, United States Courts of Appeals and various state supreme courts throughout the country. From 1999 to 2003, Kravitz served as a regular commentator and columnist for the National Law Journal on appellate law. Kravitz was an adjunct professor at Connecticut Law School from 1995 to 2001. He also has authored numerous articles on a variety of legal topics. In 2006 and 2009, he was appointed a Senior Fellow in Law at the University of Melbourne Graduate School of Law, in Melbourne, Australia. Kravitz also was a lecturer in law at Yale Law School.

== District court service ==
He was nominated by U.S. President George W. Bush to fill a seat on the court vacated by Alfred V. Covello on March 27, 2003 and was confirmed by the United States Senate on June 11, 2003. He received his commission on June 12, 2003, and was sworn in by Chief Justice Rehnquist. After Kravitz's death, on February 24, 2014, the U.S. Senate confirmed Jeffrey A. Meyer to fill the seat.

== Death ==
Kravitz died on September 30, 2012, in Guilford, Connecticut. He died of amyotrophic lateral sclerosis (ALS), commonly known as "Lou Gehrig's disease." By the time of his death, he was no longer hearing criminal cases or conducting civil trials.

== See also ==
- List of law clerks for the ninth seat of the Supreme Court of the United States

Legal offices
Preceded by Alfred V. Covello	Judge of the United States District Court for the District of Connecticut; 2003–2012	Succeeded by Jeffrey A. Meyer
