= Raheem L. Mullins =

American judge (born 1978)

Raheem Mullins

Chief Justice of the Connecticut Supreme Court
- Incumbent
- Assumed office September 30, 2024; Acting: September 30, 2024 – January 30, 2025
- Appointed by: Ned Lamont
- Preceded by: Andrew J. McDonald (acting)

Associate Justice of the Connecticut Supreme Court
- In office November 1, 2017 – January 30, 2025
- Appointed by: Dannel Malloy
- Preceded by: Dennis G. Eveleigh
- Succeeded by: William H. Bright Jr.

Personal details
- Born: March 10, 1978 (age 48)
- Education: Clark University (BA); Northeastern University (JD)

Raheem L. Mullins (born March 10, 1978) is an American lawyer who has served as the chief justice of the Connecticut Supreme Court since 2025. He previously served as an associate justice starting in 2017.

== Biography ==
Mullins graduated from the Watkinson School in Hartford in 1996 then went on to receive his Bachelor of Arts degree in Sociology from Clark University in Worcester, Massachusetts, in 2001 and his Juris Doctor from Northeastern University School of Law in 2004.

After completing law school, he worked as a law clerk for the Honorable Frederick L. Brown of the Massachusetts Appeals Court from 2004 to 2005. Prior to his appointment, Mullins was a prosecutor for the Appellate Bureau, Division of Criminal Justice, in Rocky Hill, Connecticut and an assistant attorney general in the Child Protection Division in Hartford.

He was nominated by Governor Dannel Malloy in 2012 to serve as a judge of the Middlesex County Superior Court. He was then appointed to be a judge on the Connecticut Appellate Court in 2014.

== Judicial career ==
=== Connecticut Superior Court service ===
On January 19, 2012 Mullins was nominated to the Superior Court. Upon his appointment to the Superior Court, his nomination faced criticism because at the time, at 33, he was the second-youngest person ever to be nominated for a state judgeship. He was confirmed in February 2012.

=== Connecticut Appellate Court service ===
On March 14, 2014 Mullins nominated to the Connecticut Appellate Court to seat vacated by Stuart D. Bear who faced mandatory retirement. He was confirmed by the Connecticut General Assembly on April 25, 2014. He assumed office on May 6, 2014.

=== Connecticut Supreme Court service ===
On October 4, 2017 Mullins was one of two nominations made to the Connecticut Supreme Court. He was confirmed and sworn into office on November 1, 2017.

On May 26, 2022, it was reported that Raheem L. Mullins and two Yale Law School professors, Cristina M. Rodríguez and Justin Driver were possibly being vetting for a vacancy on the United States Court of Appeals for the Second Circuit.

On May 21, 2024, Richard A. Robinson announced that he intended to retire as Chief Justice of the Connecticut Supreme Court, effective September 6, 2024. On August 29, 2024, Governor Ned Lamont nominated Mullins to replace Robinson. Mullins' nomination was approved by the Connecticut legislature's judiciary committee on September 30, 2024, allowing him to assume the position of chief justice on an acting basis. He was confirmed by the legislature on January 28, 2025.

Legal offices
Preceded by Dennis G. Eveleigh	Associate Justice of the Connecticut Supreme Court; 2017–2025	Succeeded by William H. Bright Jr.
Preceded by Andrew J. McDonald; Acting	Chief Justice of the Connecticut Supreme Court; Acting 2024–2025; 2024–present	Incumbent
