= Alfred V. Covello =

American judge (1933–2025)

Alfred Vincent Covello

Senior Judge of the United States District Court for the District of Connecticut
- In office February 4, 2003 – February 18, 2025

Chief Judge of the United States District Court for the District of Connecticut
- In office 1998–2003
- Preceded by: Peter Collins Dorsey
- Succeeded by: Robert Chatigny

Judge of the United States District Court for the District of Connecticut
- In office August 17, 1992 – February 4, 2003
- Appointed by: George H. W. Bush
- Preceded by: Seat established by 104 Stat. 5089
- Succeeded by: Mark R. Kravitz

Personal details
- Born: Alfred Vincent Covello; February 4, 1933 Hartford, Connecticut, U.S.
- Died: February 18, 2025 (aged 92) Florida, U.S.
- Education: Harvard University (AB); University of Connecticut (LLB, JD)

Alfred Vincent Covello (February 4, 1933 – February 18, 2025) was an American lawyer who served as a United States district judge of the United States District Court for the District of Connecticut from 1992 to 2025.

== Life and career ==
Covello was born in Hartford, Connecticut. He received an Artium Baccalaureus degree from Harvard University in 1954, and then a Bachelor of Laws and a Juris Doctor from the University of Connecticut School of Law in 1960. He was in the United States Army Personnel Specialist from 1955 to 1959. He was in private practice of law in Hartford from 1960 to 1974. Covello became a member of the Charter Revision Commission in West Hartford in 1964. He was counsel to this same commission in 1966 and from 1969 to 1970. He was also counsel to the Office of Corporation Counsel in West Hartford from 1964 to 1967.

=== State judicial service ===
Covello served as judge in a number of courts beginning in the 1970s. He was a judge on the Circuit Court for the State of Connecticut from 1974 to 1975, then to Connecticut's Court of Common Pleas from 1975 to 1978. He was a judge on the Superior Court of Connecticut from 1978 to 1992, and a judge on the Appellate Session of the Superior Court from 1980 to 1983. He was a justice of the Supreme Court of Connecticut from 1987 to 1992, and an administrative judge on the Appellate System in 1992.

=== Federal judicial service ===
Covello was nominated to the United States District Court for the District of Connecticut by President George H. W. Bush on April 1, 1992, to a new seat created by 104 Stat. 5089. He was confirmed by the United States Senate on August 12, 1992, and received commission on August 17, 1992. He became chief judge in 1998, serving that status until he assumed senior status on February 4, 2003.

=== Death ===
Covello died in Florida on February 18, 2025, at the age of 92.

Legal offices
Preceded by Seat established by 104 Stat. 5089	Judge of the United States District Court for the District of Connecticut; 1992–2003	Succeeded by Mark R. Kravitz
Preceded by Peter Collins Dorsey	Chief Judge of the United States District Court for the District of Connecticut; 1998–2003	Succeeded by Robert Chatigny
