= Thomas Morawetz =

Thomas H. Morawetz is an American legal scholar, philosopher, and educator who serves as the Tapping Reeve Professor of Law and Ethics at the University of Connecticut School of Law. A member of the UConn faculty since 1977, he is known for his interdisciplinary work bridging law, philosophy, and literature, as well as his teaching in criminal law, jurisprudence, and legal ethics. Morawetz's scholarship often explores the philosophical foundations of legal reasoning and the role of narrative in law. Before joining UConn, he taught philosophy at Yale University, where he earned his Ph.D. in philosophy and J.D. His writings, including Literature and the Law (2007), have contributed to the fields of law and literature and analytic jurisprudence.

== Early life and education ==
Thomas H. Morawetz earned his A.B. magna cum laude from Harvard College in 1963. Following Harvard, he pursued study in literature, philosophy, and law, spending a Fulbright Fellowship at University College, Oxford in 1963–64. He then attended Yale University, earning an M.Phil. and Ph.D. in philosophy (1968–79), and a J.D. (1968).

== Academic career ==
Morawetz joined the faculty of the University of Connecticut School of Law in 1977. He holds the title of Tapping Reeve Professor of Law and Ethics at UConn. Before his appointment at UConn, he taught philosophy at Yale (1969–77) as assistant and then associate professor.

He has also held visiting professorships at institutions including University of Southern California (1982–1983), Hastings College of the Law (Fall 1992), and Tilburg University (March 1996).

== Scholarly Contributions ==
Morawetz's research lies at the intersection of criminal law, jurisprudence, philosophy of law, and law and literature. His interests include analytic jurisprudence, hermeneutics, legal ethics, and the philosophy of knowledge.

Selected works include "Metaphor and Method: How Not to Think about Constitutional Interpretation" (1994), "On Conduits and Voices" (1996), "Commentary: The Rules of Law and the Point of Law" (1973), and the book Literature and the Law (2007) which draws on his long-running courses in Law & Literature and The Law and Literature of Crime.

In his Law & Literature work, Morawetz uses novels such as The Strange Case of Dr. Jekyll & Mr. Hyde and To Kill a Mockingbird to prompt law students to reflect on themes of guilt, responsibility, identity, and argumentation.

== Teaching Philosophy and Style ==
Morawetz believes that legal education benefits from cross-disciplinary engagement, particularly with literature and philosophy, to deepen students' reflection on law, values, and self.
