= Steven Wilf =

- Born: Philadelphia, Pennsylvania, United States
- Education: Yale University
- Occupations: Law professor, historian
- Organization(s): Law School, University of Connecticut

Steven R. Wilf is a professor of law at the University of Connecticut School of Law. He is an expert on intellectual property law, historical jurisprudence, and legal history.

== Education and career ==
Born in Philadelphia, Wilf earned his J.D. from Yale Law School and his Ph.D. from the Yale Department of History in 1995. He has been a visiting professor at Hebrew University of Jerusalem and DADD guest professor at the Free University of Berlin. Most recently, he has served as Maurice Greenberg Visiting Professor at Yale Law School.

For nearly a decade, Wilf has participated in the Advanced Research Forum on Intellectual Property Rights at the World Intellectual Property Organization (WIPO) in Geneva. He has served as Abraham L. Kaminstein Scholar in Residence at the United States Copyright Office.

Wilf has held a number of fellowships at academic institutions, including the John Carter Brown Fellow at Brown University, Comparative Legal History at the University of Chicago, Samuel I. Golieb Fellow at the New York University School of Law, a fellowship at The Institute for Advanced Studies in Jerusalem, and the Center for the Humanities, Wesleyan University, Cluster in Intellectual Property/Piracy. In 2011–2012, he was a Lemelson Fellow at the Smithsonian Institution where he worked on the history of patent law and new technologies. Prior to coming to Connecticut, where he was one of the founders of the Intellectual Property Program, Professor Wilf was a law clerk for the United States Court of Appeals for the Second Circuit.

In 2010–2011, he was a Microsoft Fellow in Law, Property, and the Economic Organization of Society at the Princeton Program in Law and Public Affairs. During the academic year 2013–2014, Wilf was appointed Elizabeth S. and Richard M. Cashin Fellow, Radcliffe Institute for Advanced Studies at Harvard University.

== Scholarship and publications ==
In intellectual property law, where he has written on trade secret, trademark, copyright, and patent systems, his research has focused on the role of culture in shaping doctrinal legal rules. As in other areas of his legal historical work, Wilf has identified the contingent elements of historical development, and seeks to unpack alternative normative outcomes.

=== Legal history ===
Wilf's scholarship in legal history has been fairly eclectic, often crossing temporal and spatial boundaries. His writings include historiographic essays analyzing legal history method and genres, writings on the role of popular legal culture in the founding era of United States law, studies in the history of intellectual property, the use of artistic forms to express legal ideas, and legal transplants.

Wilf has been particularly known for what he calls “the legal history of the imagination.” His early book, Law's Imagined Republic: Popular Politics and Criminal Justice in Revolutionary America, examines the late eighteenth-century emergence of a rich vernacular legal language in the area of criminal law, which was intimately connected to American patriot agitation against the British in the course of the American Revolution. He argues that America's decisive adaptation of rule of law should be rooted in this formative revolutionary extra-official legalism rather than in the court-based interpretation of the United States Constitution that emerges during the period of the Early Republic.

His book The Law Before the Law, addresses the question of how to understand law before a law giving moment. It suggests that archaic law is often revived by those operating in subsequent legal systems in order to establish a less encumbered jurisprudential space. Wilf's recent scholarship on the history of intellectual property law investigates the seminal role of social movements in constructing legal roles, the difficulties of establishing global legal norms within the context of commercial competition, and the particular place of extra-official grassroots mechanisms for protecting technological and artistic innovation.

== Selected publications ==
Editor, Intellectual Property Law and History (2012).

Law/Text/Past, 1 U.C. Irvine L. Rev. 543 (2011).

Law's Imagined Republic: Popular Politics and Criminal Justice in Revolutionary America (2010).

The Invention of Legal Primitivism, 10 Theoretical Inquiries in Law 485 (July 2009).

The Law Before the Law (2008).

The Making of the Post-War Paradigm in American Intellectual Property Law, 31 Colum. J.L. & Arts 139 (2008).
