= Connecticut Appellate Court =

Intermediate appellate court of Connecticut

The Connecticut Appellate Court is the court of first appeals for all cases arising from the Connecticut Superior Courts. Its creation in 1983 required Connecticut's voters and legislature to amend the state's constitution. The court heard its first cases on October 4, 1983. The Appellate Court was also a partial successor to the former Appellate Session of the Superior Court, a court established to hear appeals in minor matters (e.g., misdemeanors and minor civil matters.)

== Composition ==
The Connecticut Appellate Court is composed of nine Appellate Court Judges. However, retired Judges of the Appellate Court and of the Supreme Court can still sit on Appellate Court panels, as needed (including Joseph Pellegrino, among others). If the Chief Court Administrator is a Judge of the Appellate Court, the Appellate Court is authorized to have 10 seats. (Judge Joseph Pellegrino fulfilled this role and during his time, the Court had 10 members.) Some Judges of the former Appellate Session of the Superior Court went on to serve on the Appellate Court, notably, John Daly and Francis X. Hennessy.

== Current members ==
Name	Born	Start	Term Ends	Mandatory Retirement	Appointer	Law School
Robert Clark, Chief Judge	September 16, 1971 (age 55)	March 23, 2021 (as Appellate Judge); August 5, 2026 (as Chief Judge)	2029	2041	Ned Lamont (D)	Connecticut
Nina Elgo	June 18, 1962 (age 64)	May 25, 2017	2025	2032	Dannel Malloy (D)	Georgetown
Ingrid Moll	April 17, 1973 (age 53)	May 3, 2018	2026	2043	Dannel Malloy (D)	Connecticut
José Suarez	1966 (age 59–60)	August 12, 2020	2028	2036	Ned Lamont (D)	Connecticut
Hope Seeley	February 25, 1964 (age 62)	May 2, 2022	2030	2034	Ned Lamont (D)	Connecticut
Dawne Westbrook	–	October 27, 2023	2031	–	Ned Lamont (D)	Vanderbilt
Robin Wilson	–	March 6, 2025	2033	–	Ned Lamont (D)	Northeastern
W. Glen Pierson	–	August 5, 2026	2034	–	Ned Lamont (D)	Georgetown
Vacant	–	–	–	–	–	–
Eliot Prescott, Senior Judge	January 21, 1965 (age 61)	April 25, 2014	N/A	N/A	Dannel Malloy (D)	Connecticut

== Former members ==
- Joan K. Alexander (2020–2022)
- Bethany Alvord (2009–2026)
- Robert Beach
- William C. Bieluch (1985-1988), a former member of the Appellate Session of the Superior Court.
- Thomas Bishop (2001–2011)
- David M. Borden (1983–1990), one of the original five appointees, drafted Connecticut's Penal Code, first Administrative Judge for the Appellate System, still active as a Judge Trial Referee.
- William H. Bright Jr. (2017–2025, Chief Judge 2020–2025)
- Melanie L. Cradle (2020–2026, Chief Judge 2025–2026)
- Albert W. Cretella (1990, Senior Judge, 1990-1995): Actually married Judge Dupont, former Chief Civil Administrative Judge and Assemblyman.
- John Daly (1984–1993), Also defended Joseph "Mad Dog" Taborsky (last man in Connecticut to be executed before Michael Ross), one of the original 44 circuit court judges when the court was established in 1961 (and later rendered defunct in 1978).
- Joseph Dannehy (1983–1984), first Chief Presiding Judge.
- Robert J. Devlin Jr. (2019–2020)
- Alexandra Davis DiPentima (2011–2020, Senior Judge 2020–2023/24)
- Antoinette Dupont (1983–1999, Chief Judge, 1984–1997) Second Chief Judge, helped the Court clear an appellate backlog, brought the Court into its own right as an innovator. Still active as a Judge Trial Referee, authored the history of the Court in 2003.
- Joseph P. Flynn (2001–2010)
- Paul M. Foti (1987–2005), one of the longest serving members of the Appellate Court.
- F. Herbert Greundel
- Lubbie Harper Jr. (2005–2011), served on the Appellate Court from 2005 to 2011, when he was elevated to the Connecticut Supreme Court.
- Francis X. Hennessy (1994-2000), originally selected as a Juvenile Court Judge, he went on to serve as the Administrative Judge of the Juvenile-Family Session of the Superior Court, served as the Deputy Chief Court Administrator, sat on the former Appellate Session of the Superior Court, sat by designation on multiple occasions at the Supreme Court, nominated by Governor Weicker to serve on the Appellate Court. Still was actively serving as a Judge Trial Referee designated to the Appellate Court and maintaining chambers there until recently.
- Maxwell Heiman (1990–1997), Former President of the Connecticut Bar Association, defended Joseph "Mad Dog" Taborsky (last man to be executed in Connecticut before Michael Ross), presided over Robert Breton's capital felony trial, served Chair of the Connecticut Bar Association Intermediate Appellate Court Committee with C. Ian McLachlan.
- T. Clark Hull (1983–1987), one of the original five appointees. Former Lieutenant Governor.
- Christine Keller (2013–2020), served for seven years until elevation to the Supreme Court.
- Douglas Lavine
- C. Ian McLachlan (2003–2009), served on the Connecticut Bar Association Intermediate Appellate Court Committee, later elevated to the Supreme Court.
- Raheem L. Mullins (2014–2017) Served for 3 years until elevated to Supreme Court.
- Barry R. Schaller (1992–2007) One of two judges to sit at all five levels of Connecticut's Judiciary, the other being Joseph Dannehy.
- Michael Sheldon (2011–2019), Served 28 years in the Connecticut judiciary. Retired upon reaching mandatory retirement age of 70.
- E. Eugene Spear (1993–2002), Former Chief Civil Administrative Judge, second African American member of the Court after Flemming Norcott, former Public Defender.
- Daniel Spallone (1984–1991), Served 40 years in the judiciary, former Town Attorney in Deep River, spouse served as State Representative, son later served as State representative.
- George Stoughton (1987–1989) Former Hartford State's Attorney, returned to the Court as a Judge Trial Referee (after turning 70 in 1989 and enabling Legislation in 1995), was still active at 91 and heard cases until his death in June 2011, including assisting Justice Borden in screening criminal cases for transfer to the Supreme Court.
- Robert Testo (1983) One of the original five judges. Opted to return to the Superior Court, opening the vacancy for Daniel Spallone.

== See also ==
- Courts of Connecticut
