= Efficient breach =

In legal theory, particularly in law and economics, efficient breach is a voluntary breach of contract and payment of damages by a party who concludes that they would incur greater economic loss by performing under the contract.

== Development of the theory ==
The theory of efficient breach seeks to explain the common law's preference for expectation damages for breach of contract, as distinguished from specific performance, reliance damages, or punitive damages. According to Black's Law Dictionary, efficient breach theory is "the view that a party should be allowed to breach a contract and pay damages, if doing so would be more economically efficient than performing under the contract." Expectation damages, according to the theory, give parties an incentive to breach when and only when performance is inefficient.

Judicial laws that govern contractual agreements and the damages to be incurred upon the breach of an agreement have existed since the 15th century. The motivating factor for establishing the standards of efficient breach was to ensure that the agreement fell under the enforceable fixing of the damages by the execution. this, therefore, stated that there should be a prior forecast or prediction of the provable injury resulting to the breach, otherwise, the breach will be unenforceable and then and breaching party will be limited to unconventional damage measures liquidated. The common law courts then continued to revisit the provisions of liquidated damage provision from the "breacher" compensating for injury and losses only, to a consideration of cost and damages incurred during the process of breaching the contract, as well as the benefits that breaching the contract may have already experienced from the contract. As such, the non-breacher of the contract is in the same position as if the contract had undertaken its full performance, thus, establishing and maintaining efficiency value of the rule

The first statement of the theory of efficient breach appears to have been made in 1970 in a law review article by Robert L. Birmingham in "Breach of Contract, Damage Measures, and Economic Efficiency". The theory was named seven years later by Charles Goetz and Robert Scott. Efficient breach theory is commonly associated with Richard Posner and the Law and Economics school of thought. Posner explains his views in his majority opinion in Lake River Corp. v. Carborundum Co., 769 F.2d 1284 (7th Cir. 1985).

Simple versions of the efficient breach theory employed arguments from welfare economics, operating on the premise that legal rules should be designed to give parties an incentive to act in ways that maximize aggregate welfare or achieve Pareto efficiency. More sophisticated versions of the theory maintain that parties themselves prefer remedies that incentivize efficient breach, as efficient breach maximizes the gains of trade from transacting. As Richard Posner and Andrew Rosenfeld put the point, "the more efficiently the exchange is structured, the larger is the potential profit of the contract for the parties to divide between them."

== Posner's illustration ==
Judge Richard Posner gave a well-known illustration of efficient breach:

Suppose I sign a contract to deliver 100,000 custom-ground widgets at $0.10 apiece to A, for use in his boiler factory. After I have delivered 10,000, B comes to me, explains that he desperately needs 25,000 custom-ground widgets at once since otherwise he will be forced to close his pianola factory at great cost, and offers me $0.15 apiece for 25,000 widgets. I sell him the widgets and as a result do not complete timely delivery to A, who sustains $1000 in profits. Having obtained an additional profit of $1250 on the sale to B, I am better off even after reimbursing A for his loss, and B is also better off.

== Criticism ==
Some, such as Charles Fried in his "Contract as Promise", have argued that morally, A is obligated to honor a contract made with B because A has made a promise. Fried wrote, "The moralist of duty thus posits a general obligation to keep promises, of which the obligation of contract will only be a special case – that special case in which certain promises have attained legal as well as moral force." It would seem that Fried has since revised his interpretation.

Others argue that the costs of litigation relevant to gaining expectation damages from breach would leave one or both of the original parties worse off than if the contract had simply been performed. Also, Posner's hypothetical assumes that the seller is aware of the value the buyer places on the commodity, or the cost of purchase plus the profits the buyer will make.

== Other contributions ==
Other development in the efficiency breach theory include the exhaustion of all possible benefits that would be accrued by consumer in case of breaching of any exclusive contracts in daily business scenarios. The seller in the contract will incur an overall loss of the profits that would have been enjoyed if the contract was maintained. However, the seller will retain the cost of the damages that may have been incurred by the time of breaching the contract. The buyers, on the other side, suffers the loss of making close to no profits against their competitor in the instance that a contract was breached. As a result, the final consumer enjoys the most benefits of low prices, or as close to cost as possible.

== Main Literature ==
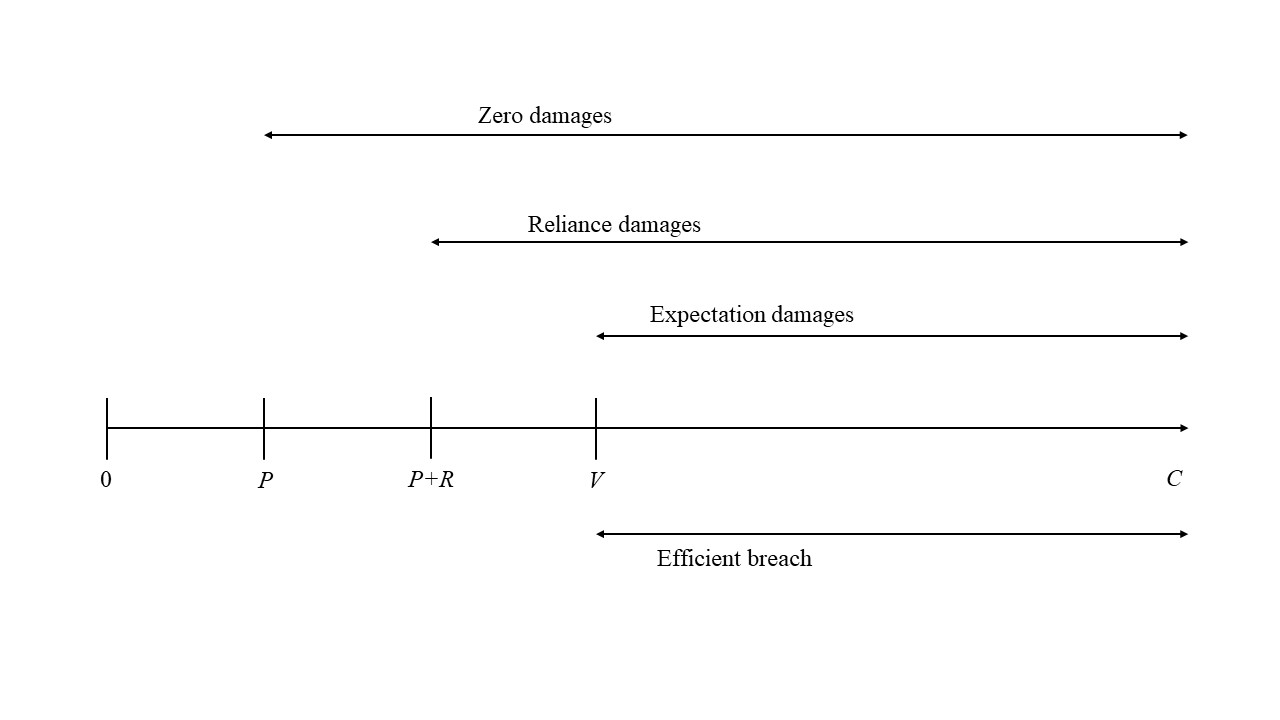
Ranges of Breach

=== Unbundling Efficient Breach: An Experiment ===
Scholars in the fields of law and economics have performed a comprehensive study of effective breach of contract cases. According to this Standard review, where the contract's execution results in a violation of contract, the breach is successful. Each party's overall surplus is negative. By categorizing successful violations as a single class of event, recent literature has overlooked the possibility that the violation of finding benefits is distinct from the violation of preventing losses.

=== Tortious Interference with Contract Versus "Efficient" Breach: Theory and Empirical Evidence ===
For academics, both moral and constructive, tortious action is vexing because it supports the economic model of "successful violation of contract" by punishing a third party for inducing breach. Nonetheless, academics have discovered a secondary rationale for invention to explain the coexistence of "successful" breaches and infringement interference. This article discusses why, on a normative level, tort interference would become a component of the better legal framework. Interference in contract rights offers obvious land security for contract rights (conversely, lack of data). When a third party assesses the promiser's results more favorably than the promiser does, processing costs are minimized. On the plus side, the rule of violation interference conforms to the first better model suggested here. The regression study of infringement intrusion proceedings demonstrates even more plainly that the second best factors proposed by effective breach researchers are insufficient to justify the case's result. The variables found in the best model here do have a substantial impact on the case's outcome.
