= Timothy Fisher (lawyer) =

American lawyer (born 1953)

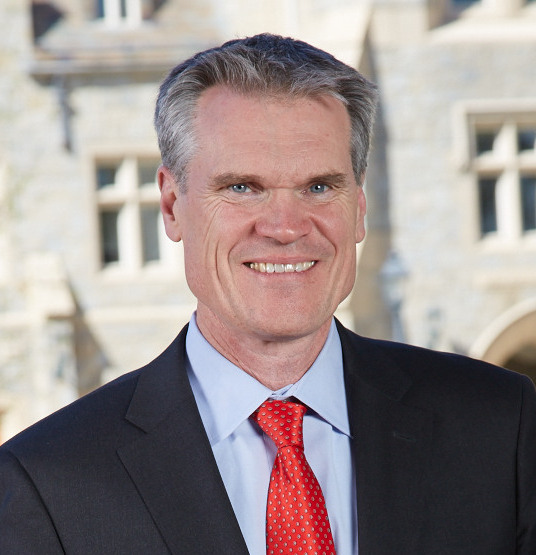
- Fisher in 2013

17th Dean of the University of Connecticut School of Law
- In office July 1, 2013 – July 30, 2020
- Preceded by: Jeremy R. Paul
- Succeeded by: Eboni S. Nelson

Personal details
- Born: December 12, 1953 (age 72)
- Spouse: Dina Fisher
- Education: Yale University (BA); Columbia Law School (JD)
- Occupation: Law professor Lawyer; Administrator
- Website: Timothy Fisher

Timothy Fisher (born December 12, 1953) is dean and professor of law emeritus at the University of Connecticut School of Law.

== Early life and education ==
Fisher grew up in New Haven, Connecticut; San Francisco; San Juan, Puerto Rico; and Hartford, Connecticut. He attended Hartford Public High School and graduated in 1975 from Yale University with a B.A. in economics and in 1978 with a J.D. from Columbia Law School.

== Legal career ==
From 1978 to 2013, Fisher worked in private practice, the last 10 years as a partner at McCarter & English LLP. His legal practice and publications have focused on ethics, alternate dispute resolution, commercial transactions, construction law, family wealth disputes, and municipal law. His pro bono work has involved marriage equality, prison conditions, speedy criminal appeal rights, and strategic relationships of non-profit organizations. He has served as a member of the Governor's Commission on Judicial Reform, as chairman of the Connecticut Commission on Judicial Compensation, as co-chair of the Task Force to Improve Access to Legal Counsel in Civil Matters, as a member of the Connecticut Eyewitness Identification Task Force, and as a member of the Connecticut Judicial Branch Access to Justice Commission. From 2010 to 2013, he was president of the Connecticut Bar Foundation. He served as treasurer of the Connecticut Bar Association from 2002 to 2003, chaired the association's Courts and Alternative Dispute Resolution Section and its Task Force on Confidentiality, and co-chaired its Task Force on the Future of the Legal Profession. He was a founder of the Connecticut Innocence Fund, which supports people who have been exonerated and released from prison. He serves on the Federal Grievance Committee for the District of Connecticut and is a member of the Board of Directors of the Open Communities Alliance. He is also a member of The Registry for Colleges and Universities, a source of interim leadership candidates in higher education.

== Academic career ==
Fisher began teaching as an adjunct professor at the University of Connecticut School of Law and at the Quinnipiac University School of Law while he was still in private practice. He became the 17th dean of the University of Connecticut School of Law on July 1, 2013. His selection was considered unconventional, given his background in corporate law. On July 31, 2020, he stepped down from the dean's office to join the UConn Law faculty. During his tenure the law school established the Connecticut Community Law Center, a legal incubator; expanded its clinical programs; and opened the Brown Family Campus Center.

== Publications ==
- Fisher, Timothy S. (2024) "Lessons Learned: the Experience of Non-traditional Law Deans and the Law Schools that Hire Them"
- Fisher, Timothy S. (1994) "Check Fraud Litigation in Connecticut after the 1990 Revisions to the U.C.C"
- Fisher, Timothy S. (1991) Connecticut Law of Check Fraud Atlantic Law Book Co.
