= Courts of Connecticut =

Courts in Connecticut

Courts of Connecticut include:

State courts of Connecticut

- Connecticut Supreme Court
  - Connecticut Appellate Court
    - Connecticut Superior Court (13 districts)
    - Connecticut Probate Courts (54 districts)

Federal court located in Connecticut:

- United States District Court for the District of Connecticut
