= Warren William Eginton =

American judge (1924–2019)

Senior Judge of the United States District Court for the District of Connecticut
- In office August 1, 1992 – October 7, 2019

Judge of the United States District Court for the District of Connecticut
- In office July 24, 1979 – August 1, 1992
- Appointed by: Jimmy Carter
- Preceded by: Seat established by 92 Stat. 1629
- Succeeded by: Robert Chatigny

Personal details
- Born: February 16, 1924 New York City, New York, U.S.
- Died: October 7, 2019 (aged 95) Redding, Connecticut, U.S.
- Education: Princeton University (AB); Yale University (LLB)

Warren William Eginton (February 16, 1924 – October 7, 2019) was an American jurist who served as a United States district judge of the United States District Court for the District of Connecticut.

== Education and career ==
Born on February 16, 1924, in Brooklyn, New York City, Eginton was in the United States Army during World War II, from 1943 to 1946, achieving the rank of lieutenant. He received an Artium Baccalaureus degree from Princeton University in 1948, and a Bachelor of Laws from Yale Law School in 1951. He continued to serve in the United States Army Reserve from 1946 to 1973, achieving the rank of lieutenant colonel.

Eginton was in private practice of law in New York City from 1951 to 1953, and in Stamford, Connecticut, from 1953 to 1979. He also served as an adjunct professor at the New York University Law School, as well as the Fordham Law School.

== Federal judicial service ==
On June 5, 1979, Eginton was nominated by President Jimmy Carter to a new seat on the United States District Court for the District of Connecticut created by 92 Stat. 1629. He was confirmed by the United States Senate on July 23, 1979, and received his commission on July 24, 1979.

Eginton specialized in legal liability lawsuits, and sometimes visited other courts throughout the United States to assist with such cases. He also presided over multiple notable cases, including, in 1981, a case against a member of the Hell's Angels who at the time referred to as "the most dangerous man in Connecticut". For two weeks during that trial, Eginton was even assigned U.S. Marshals protection. In 1987, he also heard the ensuing litigation after the L'Ambiance Plaza collapse in Bridgeport, Connecticut.

During his time on the bench, Eginton was also known for enjoying presiding over naturalization ceremonies. Eginton assumed senior status on August 1, 1992, but he continued to hear cases until days before his death. He died in hospice care in Redding, Connecticut, on October 7, 2019, at age 95. At the time, he was the longest-serving federal judge in Connecticut, having spent over four decades as a judge.

== Writing career ==
From 1988-93, Eginton was Editor-in-Chief of Butterworth Legal Publishers' Product Liability Law Journal and published several papers on product liability law.

Legal offices
Preceded by Seat established by 92 Stat. 1629	Judge of the United States District Court for the District of Connecticut; 1979–1992	Succeeded by Robert Chatigny
