= Thomas Leonardi =

- Born: February 19, 1954 (age 72); Brooklyn, New York
- Education: Boston University
- Occupation: Business executive insurance/insurance commissioner

Thomas Benedict Leonardi (born February 19, 1954), is United States business executive in the insurance and financial services fields, who has worked in the public and private sectors. His career includes decades as the head of investment banking and venture capital firms specializing in insurance, and he also has a background as a regulator and government adviser.

From February 2011 to December 2014 he was the Insurance Commissioner of the state of Connecticut, during which time he instituted reforms and consumer protections, led the state through the implementation of the Affordable Care Act, increased the presence of insurance businesses in the state, and served on several national and international insurance advisory bodies.

Following his tenure as insurance commissioner, he returned to the private sector. From November 2017 until May 2020 he was executive vice president of government affairs, public policy, and communications at AIG.

In February 2021 he joined the board of Athene Co-Invest Reinsurance Affiliate (ACRA). Leonardi has published commentary on insurance and reinsurance matters while noting that he serves as an independent board member of Athene-affiliated entities, while also stating that the views expressed are his own.

In May 2021 he joined the board of The Travelers Companies, (TRV) one of the world's largest property casualty companies and one of the thirty companies in the Dow Jones Industrial Average. He is the Chair of TRV's Nominating & Governance committee, and a member of the Executive, Investment & Capital Markets, and Compensation Committees.

== Early life and education ==
Leonardi was born in Brooklyn, New York in 1954, one of four children of first-generation Italian Americans. The family moved to Connecticut in 1972.

He attended Boston University, graduating Summa cum laude and Phi Beta Kappa, with a B.A. in history in 1976. He received a J.D. with honors in 1979 from the University of Connecticut School of Law.

== Career ==
=== Early career ===
From 1979 to 1983, Leonardi was a litigation attorney at the law firm Gager, Henry & Narkis in Connecticut. He subsequently spent three years as president of insurance subsidiaries at Beneficial Corporation in New Jersey.

In 1987 he returned to Connecticut and was a senior vice president for two years at the insurance-specialized investment bank Conning & Company, where he oversaw their investment banking, venture capital, and mergers and acquisitions divisions.

=== Northington Partners ===
In February 1989, along with four of his colleagues from Conning & Company, Leonardi founded Northington Partners, a Connecticut-headquartered broker dealer, venture capital, private equity, and investment banking firm specializing in the insurance industry, as its chairman and CEO.

During his 22 years as head of Northington, Leonardi provided strategic, investment, capital-raising, and financial advisory services to insurance companies, and advised managements and boards of directors of companies specializing in property casualty reinsurance, workers compensation, alternative risk reinsurance, medical malpractice insurance, and other forms of insurance. He also raised and managed over $110 million of capital commitments in two investment funds.

=== Insurance Commissioner of Connecticut ===
In February 2011, newly inaugurated governor Dannel Malloy appointed Leonardi insurance commissioner of the state of Connecticut, which generates more insurance business than all but six nations.

During his four-year tenure, Leonardi increased consumer education and public outreach, including on social media; rolled out an emergency-operations center at the Connecticut Insurance Department to ensure that insurers respond quickly to disasters; instituted numerous consumer-protection measures; built productive relationships with consumer associations and industry trade associations; fostered the creation and expansion of insurance business in Connecticut; and advocated state, national, and global regulatory standards. In 2012 he created Connecticut's first dedicated captive insurance division.

He oversaw the roll-out of the Affordable Care Act in Connecticut and a well-functioning state portal and health insurance exchange to it, recovered nearly $4 million annually for consumers by following up on complaints, and stymied increased deductibles for Hurricane Sandy and Tropical Storm Irene. Leonardi became known as an expert on a variety of regulatory issues. He was the only U.S. insurance regulator to have concurrently sat on three committees of the International Association of Insurance Supervisors (IAIS): the Executive, Technical, and Financial Stability committees; he was one of only two U.S. insurance commissioners on its executive committee; and for three years he was the only U.S. regulator on its Financial Stability Committee.

Leonardi speaks frequently on matters concerning U.S. insurance regulations, such as the international systemic risk designations. He was a noted advocate for protecting the system of state-based regulation of the insurance industry in the U.S., opposing the recommendations by both the Financial Stability Board and the Federal Insurance Office and its director Mike McRaith for federal regulation of the industry. He opposed the efforts of Solvency II proponents in the European Union to insist on an equivalent capitalization requirement for U.S. insurance companies. He was active on more than 15 supervisory colleges for large internationally active insurance and reinsurance groups in the U.S. and Europe. Under his direction the Connecticut Insurance Department (CID) became the first U.S. regulatory agency to join an international supervisory cooperation and information-exchange agreement. In 2012 the CID signed on to a memorandum of understanding with International Association of Insurance Supervisors creating a framework of cooperation among international supervisory groups and a commitment to sharing of information between agencies.

Leonardi spent three years on the U.S. Treasury's inaugural Federal Advisory Committee on Insurance, created in November 2011. In November 2013 he was one of only three insurance commissioners to attend a meeting with President Obama in the Oval Office to discuss the details of the roll-out of the Affordable Care Act; the commissioners also voiced complaints to Obama about the Federal Insurance Office and the Financial Stability Board. He was the only U.S. regulator to be invited to testify at the February 2014 Congressional hearing on the Federal Insurance Office's Insurance Modernization report.

During his term as insurance commissioner of Connecticut, Leonardi held multiple leadership positions at the National Association of Insurance Commissioners (NAIC), including being a member of its executive committee, Chair of its International Insurance Relations Committee, Chair of its Financial Stability Task Force, Vice Chair of its Accreditation Committee, and chair of its 12-state Northeast Zone. In February 2012 he was elected to the board of directors of the National Insurance Producer Registry (NIPR), as a representative of the NAIC.

At the December 2013 meeting of the NAIC, Leonardi distributed to fellow members a detailed letter sharply critical of the NAIC's governing body and its recent decisions, and recommending that outside consultants conduct a thorough evaluation of its governance structure and policies. Although discussion of the letter was quashed at the meeting, it generated much attention in trade journals, and was referred to by congresspersons in a February 2014 House hearing on federal vs. state regulation of the insurance industry. In April 2014 Russ Banham dubbed Leonardi "Rebel with a Cause" in a lengthy analysis of the letter in the magazine Leader's Edge. In July 2014 the NAIC announced it would engage a consultant to audit its governance and policy-making practices. In August 2014 Leonardi told AM Best the review and choice of vendor had been "hijacked" from the panel that started the process, in a move by NAIC leadership to form a separate panel that would conduct interviews and choose the consultant. By November 2014 no consultant had been chosen.

In 2014 Leonardi was one of 20 people chosen to serve on the World Economic Forum's Global Council on Insurance and Asset Management.

=== Return to private sector ===
==== Evercore ====
In January 2015 Leonardi, having completed his four year term as Connecticut Insurance Commissioner, returned to the private sector and joined the New York-based global investment banking advisory firm Evercore as a senior advisor focusing on the insurance industry. Based in New York, he worked out of Evercore's New York and London offices. He also remained active on national panels as an insurance industry and regulation expert.

==== AIG ====
In November 2017 Leonardi joined AIG, hired by new CEO Brian Duperreault as executive vice president of government affairs, public policy, and communications. Based at AIG headquarters in New York, he reported to Duperreault. He oversaw AIG's global public policy and government affairs, and maintained communication with regulators that oversee the company at the state, federal, and international levels. AIG's head of international government affairs reported to him. Leonardi also oversaw AIG's corporate communications and marketing. He left AIG at the end of May 2020.

In October 2018 he was elected to the board of directors of the American Council of Life Insurers. In 2019 he was elected to the board of directors of the Insurance Information Institute. He also served on the board of directors of the American Property Casualty Insurance Association (APCIA).

In February 2021 he joined the board of Athene Co-Invest Reinsurance Affiliate (ACRA 1), a Bermuda-based investment company.<https://www.athenelifere.bm/about/athene-history/> In May 2021, he was elected to the board of directors of the Travelers Companies (TRV) one of the nation's largest property casualty insurers and one of 30 companies comprising the DJIA. He is the chair of the Nominating and Governance Committee, a member of the Executive, Investment and Capital Markets, and Compensation committees. In 2024 he joined the board of ACRA 2. <https://www.sec.gov/Archives/edgar/data/0000086312/000120677421000970/trv3788451-def14a.htm>
