= Jeffrey A. Meyer =

American judge (1963–2025)

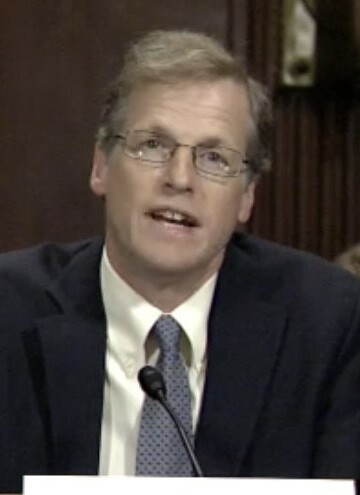
- Meyer in 2013

Judge of the United States District Court for the District of Connecticut
- In office February 25, 2014 – January 12, 2025
- Appointed by: Barack Obama
- Preceded by: Mark R. Kravitz
- Succeeded by: vacant

Personal details
- Born: Jeffrey Alker Meyer; April 13, 1963 North Tarrytown, New York, U.S. (now Sleepy Hollow)
- Died: January 12, 2025 (aged 61)
- Parent: J. Edward Meyer (father)
- Education: Yale University (BA, JD)

Jeffrey Alker Meyer (April 13, 1963 – January 12, 2025) was a United States district judge of the United States District Court for the District of Connecticut and a professor of law at Quinnipiac University School of Law.

== Life and career ==
=== Background ===
Meyer was born on April 13, 1963, in North Tarrytown, New York to Ed Meyer and Linda Lowry. He received a Bachelor of Arts degree, summa cum laude, in 1985, from Yale College. He received a Juris Doctor in 1989 from Yale Law School. From 1989 to 1990, he clerked for Judge James L. Oakes of the United States Court of Appeals for the Second Circuit. From 1991 to 1992, he clerked for Justice Harry Blackmun of the United States Supreme Court. Between 1992 and 1995, he worked first at the Washington, D.C. law firm of Shearman & Sterling and then at Kellogg, Huber, Hansen, Todd, Evans & Figel, and then as a staff attorney for Vermont Legal Aid. He served as an Assistant United States Attorney in the District of Connecticut from 1995 to 2004, serving as Appeals Chief from 2000 to 2004. He served as senior counsel to the Independent Inquiry Committee into the United Nations Oil for Food Program in Iraq from 2004 to 2005. Starting in 2006, he had been a professor of law at Quinnipiac University School of Law and a visiting professor of law at Yale Law School since 2010.

=== Federal judicial service ===
On June 7, 2013, President Barack Obama nominated Meyer to serve as a United States District Judge of the United States District Court for the District of Connecticut, to the seat vacated by Judge Mark R. Kravitz, who died on October 1, 2012. He was unanimously rated by the American Bar Association as a "Well Qualified" judicial nominee (ratings are: Well Qualified, Qualified and Not Qualified). His nomination was unanimously approved by the Senate Judiciary Committee on September 19, 2013. On February 12, 2014, Senate Majority Leader Harry Reid filed for cloture on Meyer's nomination. On February 24, 2014, the United States Senate invoked cloture on his nomination by a 55–37 vote, with 1 senator voted “present”. His nomination was confirmed later that day by a 91–2 vote. Meyer received his judicial commission on February 25, 2014. He remained in active service until he died from a long illness on January 12, 2025.

== Cases adjudicated ==
Judge Meyer presided over a long-running lawsuit claiming that Poland Spring Water was improperly marketed as "spring water." He declined to dismiss the case on several occasions.

Judge Meyer also presided over the trial of several officials from the Connecticut Municipal Electric Energy Cooperative. Three of the officials—Drew Rankin, John Bilda, and James Sullivan—were convicted of theft from a program that received federal funds. The defendants allegedly used CMEEC funds to take lavish trips to the Kentucky Derby and a luxury golf resort.

== Death ==
Meyer died from lymphoma on January 12, 2025.

== See also ==
- List of law clerks for the second seat of the Supreme Court of the United States

== Sources ==
- Jeffrey A. Meyer at Ballotpedia

Legal offices
| Preceded by Mark R. Kravitz | Judge of the United States District Court for the District of Connecticut; 2014–2025 | Vacant |
