= William H. Bright Jr. =

American judge (born 1962)

William Bright

Associate Justice of the Connecticut Supreme Court
- Incumbent
- Assumed office March 5, 2025
- Appointed by: Ned Lamont
- Preceded by: Raheem L. Mullins

Chief Judge of the Connecticut Appellate Court
- In office August 1, 2020 – March 5, 2025
- Appointed by: Richard A. Robinson
- Preceded by: Alexandra Davis DiPentima
- Succeeded by: Melanie L. Cradle

Judge of the Connecticut Appellate Court
- In office November 1, 2017 – March 5, 2025
- Appointed by: Dannel Malloy
- Succeeded by: Robin Wilson

Personal details
- Born: August 15, 1962 (age 63)
- Education: Dickinson College (BA); University of Chicago (JD)

William H. Bright Jr. (born August 15, 1962) is an associate justice of the Connecticut Supreme Court. He previously served as the chief judge of the Connecticut Appellate Court.

== Education ==
Bright earned his Bachelor of Arts from Dickinson College in 1984 and his J.D. degree from the University of Chicago Law School in 1987.

== Career ==
He was the managing partner of McCarter & English's Hartford law office and co-chair of the firm's Business Litigation practice group. He also was a shareholder in Cummings & Lockwood, a member of the firm's Board of Directors, and chair of the firm's Litigation practice group.

=== State court service ===
Bright was appointed to the Tolland District Superior Court by Connecticut Governor Jodi Rell in 2008.

=== Appointment to state appellate court ===
On October 4, 2017, Governor Dan Malloy appointed him to the Connecticut Appellate Court. He was confirmed on November 1, 2017. On April 24, 2020, Chief Justice Richard A. Robinson announced the appointment of Bright to be the next Chief Judge of the Connecticut Appellate Court, effective August 1, 2020.

=== Connecticut Supreme Court ===
On January 27, 2025, Governor Lamont nominated Bright to serve as an associate justice of the Connecticut Supreme Court. He was nominated to fill the vacancy left by the elevation of Raheem L. Mullins to serve as chief justice. On February 26, 2025, his nomination was reported out of committee. On March 5, his nomination was confirmed by the Connecticut General Assembly and he was sworn in later that day.

Legal offices
Preceded by Raheem L. Mullins	Associate Justice of the Connecticut Supreme Court; 2025–present	Incumbent
