= Robert Chatigny =

American judge (born 1951)

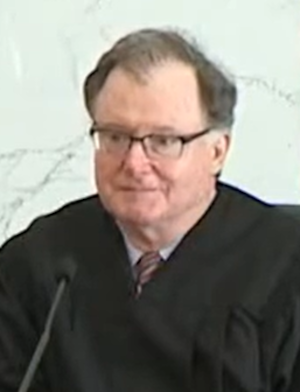

Senior Judge of the United States District Court for the District of Connecticut
- Incumbent
- Assumed office December 31, 2016

Chief Judge of the United States District Court for the District of Connecticut
- In office February 4, 2003 – September 2009
- Preceded by: Alfred V. Covello
- Succeeded by: Alvin W. Thompson

Judge of the United States District Court for the District of Connecticut
- In office September 29, 1994 – December 31, 2016
- Appointed by: Bill Clinton
- Preceded by: Warren William Eginton
- Succeeded by: Kari A. Dooley

Personal details
- Born: Robert Neil Chatigny; October 17, 1951 (age 74) Taunton, Massachusetts, U.S.
- Education: Brown University (AB); Georgetown University (JD)

Robert Neil Chatigny (born October 17, 1951) is a senior United States district judge of the United States District Court for the District of Connecticut.

== Education ==
Chatigny received a Bachelor of Arts degree from Brown University in 1973 and a Juris Doctor from Georgetown University Law Center in 1978, where he was Case and Note Editor of the Georgetown Law Journal.

== Career ==
Chatigny served as a law clerk to three different judges: Samuel Conti of the United States District Court for the Northern District of California from 1979 to 1980; José A. Cabranes of the United States District Court for the District of Connecticut in 1980; and Jon O. Newman of the United States Court of Appeals for the Second Circuit from 1980 to 1981. He was in the private practice of law in Washington, D.C., from 1981 to 1983 and in Hartford, Connecticut, from 1984 to 1994.

=== Federal judicial service ===
Chatigny was nominated to the court by President Bill Clinton on August 5, 1994, to a seat vacated by Judge Warren William Eginton, confirmed by the United States Senate on September 28, 1994, and received his commission on September 29, 1994. He served as chief judge of the court from 2003 to September 2009. He assumed senior status on December 31, 2016.

=== Consideration for Second Circuit ===
Chatigny was nominated by President Barack Obama to a seat on the United States Court of Appeals for the Second Circuit. The nomination received a unanimous rating of "well qualified" from the American Bar Association's Standing Committee on the Federal Judiciary, and the U.S. Judiciary Committee approved the nomination on June 10, 2010, on an 11–7 party-line vote. No date was set for full Senate consideration.

==== Support for the nomination ====
Supporters included three Republican former appointees as United States Attorney for the District of Connecticut who said in a letter to the Judiciary Committee in April 2010 that they "support, without any reservation," this nomination. They wrote: "While each of us has dealt with Judge Chatigny under different circumstances, we have found him to be even tempered, thorough and without agenda. We believe that he is a fair minded and impartial judge, who has appropriate fitness and temperament for the appellate court.... We believe that a close examination of Judge Chatigny's record in sentencing federal criminal defendants shows that he is appropriately sensitive to the facts of the person before him and the rights of victims of the crimes that have been committed. Indeed, it is our understanding that the government has never filed an appeal from Judge Chatigny's sentencings and that there has only been one defendant who has appealed from an upward departure. We are of the strong opinion that Judge Chatigny's record on the bench makes him an outstanding and very qualified candidate." Seventeen former federal prosecutors who have worked with Judge Chatigny wrote to the Senate Judiciary Committee that "in criminal as well as civil matters Judge Chatigny has proven himself over the course of 15 years on the bench to be unbiased, compassionate and temperate."

==== Opposition to the nomination ====
Opposition has centered upon judicial restraint and attitude toward sexual offenders. On March 5, 2010, one of the prosecutors in the Michael B. Ross case, Michael E. O'Hara, Supervisory Assistant State's Attorney for the State of Connecticut, wrote a 12-page letter to the U. S. Senate Judiciary Committee to elaborate upon the complaint that was filed and dismissed in 2005/2006, stating that Judge Chatigny's actions "certainly call into questions [sic] Judge Chatigny's fitness to serve on the United States Court of Appeals for the Second Circuit." A May 26, 2010 Washington Times editorial enumerated 1) that Chatigny served as co-counsel for director Woody Allen when he unsuccessfully complained against a prosecutor who had publicly stated he had probable cause grounds for Allen's reportedly abusing a minor stepchild; 2) that Judge Chatigny was reversed by the U.S. Supreme Court in 2001 "when the judge tried to rule against one aspect of his state's sex-offender registry"; 3) that the sentences imposed by Judge Chatigny in 12 child-pornography cases were "either at or more lenient than the recommended minimum - with most downward departures involving sentences less than half as long"; and 4) that, in the Ross case, Judge Chatigny "threatened to take away an attorney's law license if the lawyer failed to appeal the death sentence of an eight-time murderer of girls and young women. The judge claimed the killer's 'sexual sadism' was a mental disorder that made the murderer himself a victim."

=== Notable rulings ===
He gained national attention in 2005 when he delayed the execution of Michael Bruce Ross in order to determine if he was competent to waive challenges to his death sentence and potentially prevent a violation of the Eighth Amendment's prohibition on cruel and unusual punishment. Ross was subsequently found competent to waive his rights and was executed. The prosecution filed a complaint against Judge Chatigny that was dismissed by the Second Circuit Judicial Council in a 24-page decision on July 26, 2006.

In its 2006 dismissal of charges in the Ross case, the Second Circuit Judicial Council found that Judge Chatigny's actions "were not motivated by any bias in favor of Ross [the prisoner] or against the death penalty, but only by the judge's reasonable perception that the discharge of his own judicial duty...required that he take forceful steps on Ross's behalf.... While the judge used strong language, there was no misconduct....[I]n the judge's reasonable view, the circumstances thrust on him called for unusual action in discharge of judicial duty to ensure the fair resolution of the important proceeding before him."

Chatigny has yet to rule on the appeal of former Yale professor James Van de Velde, who had sued the city of New Haven in 2001, then Yale in 2003, for allowing his name to be leaked at the inception of the investigation into the death of Yale student Suzanne Jovin in December, 1998. Chatigny dismissed the federal fourth amendment claims in March 2004, but left alone the state claims relating to the ruination of Van de Velde's career. By not allowing the case to proceed, Van de Velde claims his efforts to "shed light on the cold case and pressure the authorities try to solve the case" have been stonewalled.

Of the 440-some opinions Judge Chatigny has issued as a federal court judge since 1994, 16 have been reversed. An analysis by the Sentencing Commission for Fiscal Years 2005-9, provided by Judge Chatigny, place his departure rate "in line with the average for the District of Connecticut as a whole."

== See also ==
- Barack Obama judicial appointment controversies
- List of Jewish American jurists

Legal offices
| Preceded by Warren William Eginton | Judge of United States District Court for the District of Connecticut; 1994–2016 | Succeeded by Kari A. Dooley |
| Preceded by Alfred V. Covello | Chief Judge of United States District Court for the District of Connecticut; 2003–2009 | Succeeded by Alvin W. Thompson |
