= Bethany Alvord =

American judge (born 1957)

Bethany J. Alvord

Judge of the Connecticut Appellate Court
- In office April 22, 2009 – 2026
- Appointed by: Mary Jodi Rell

Judge of the Connecticut Superior Court
- In office 2002–2009
- Appointed by: John G. Rowland

Personal details
- Born: Bethany Jean Alvord; June 20, 1957 (age 69) Boston, Massachusetts, U.S.
- Party: Republican
- Spouse: H. Craig Leroy
- Education: Colgate University (BA); University of Connecticut (JD)

Bethany Jean Alvord (born June 20, 1957) is an American lawyer and judge from Connecticut. She is a former judge on the Connecticut Appellate Court.

== Appointment to state appellate court ==
She was appointed by Governor Mary Jodi Rell on April 22, 2009, and reappointed in 2017. Her second eight-year term expired on April 21, 2025.
