= Robert L. Birmingham =

American academic

Robert L. Birmingham is an American academic and legal scholar, who specializes in admiralty law, federal courts, energy law, and law and philosophy. He is a professor of law at the University of Connecticut School of Law. He is best known for originating the theory of efficient breach of contract.

== Education ==
In 1960, Birmingham earned an AB from the University of Pittsburgh. In 1963, he earned his JD at the University of Pittsburgh School of Law. During law school, Birmingham distinguished himself as editor-in-chief of the University of Pittsburgh Law Review. While completing his third and final law school year, and also serving as law journal editor-in-chief, Birmingham was enrolled in the first year of a PhD program in economics. After law school, Birmingham traveled to New England, where he earned his LLM, from Harvard Law School (1965). Birmingham returned to the University of Pittsburgh where, in 1967, he completed his doctorate in economics, and then a PhD in philosophy in 1976.

== Career ==
Birmingham's first teaching position was as visiting assistant professor of law at Ohio State University in 1967. From there he moved on and taught as an assistant professor of law at Indiana University, Bloomington from 1967 to 1971. During the debate over the adoption of the proposed Twenty-sixth Amendment to the United States Constitution, extending the right to vote to persons over the age of 18, Birmingham came down firmly in favor of ratifying the amendment, noting that successive presidential and congressional combinations could otherwise raise or lower the voting age at will. Upon ascending to Associate Professor in 1971, Birmingham stayed for three additional years ending his time at Indiana in 1973. He returned as a visiting professor in 1978–1979, but the majority of the time between 1974 and 2007 has been spent lecturing on the campus of the University of Connecticut School of Law. As of 2020, he is the most tenured full professor on the UConn Law faculty. (Note: Robert L. Birmingham 1974; Jill C. Anderson 2010; Paul Bader 2002; Jon Bauer 1988; Mary Beattie 2018; Loftus Becker 1977; Bethany Berger – (young prof); Phillip I. Blumberg (1974–1984) Now a dean; Kiel Brennan-Marquez (Young); Sara C. Bronin (Young Prof); Paul Chill (Dean since 1988); John Aloysius Cogan, Jr. (2013); Mathilde Cohen (2012); Covello, Diane (young Prof); Anne C. Dailey (1990); Miguel de Figueiredo (Associate prof); Jessica de Perio Wittman (Associate prof); Timothy Everett (1987); Fernow, Todd (1983); Richard Michael Fischl (2006); Fisher, Timothy (2003); Greene, Hillary (2007); Mark Weston Janis (1980); Richard S. Kay (2016); Darcy Kirk (1996); Peter Kochenburger (Associate prof); James Kwak (2013); Alexandra D. Lahav (2004); Molly Land (2013); Leslie C. Levin (2012); Joseph A. MacDougald (Prof in residence); Hugh C. Macgill (1971–1990) Dean from 1990–2000; Brendan S. Maher (young prof); Jennifer Mailly (2000); Willajeanne F. McLean (1991); Thomas H. Morawetz (1977); Jamelia Morgan (Associate prof); Minor Myers (2019); R. Kent Newmyer (1997); Ángel Oquendo (Young Prof); Sachin S. Pandya (2008); Richard W. Parker (2007); Lisa Perkins (2015); Ellen Ash Peters (visiting prof); Richard Pomp (2007); Jessica Rubin (2013); Susan Schmeiser (2002); Peter Siegelman (2004); Douglas M. Spencer (young prof); James H. Stark (1979); Stephen Utz (1983); Richard A. Wilson (2009))

In 2007, Birmingham was required to take a leave of absence after showing a film clip to a class that featured an interview with a pimp followed by a scene of "scantily clad women in a sexually suggestive pose". It was later announced that he would return to teaching the following semester, but would not be teaching his usual feminist legal theory course.

== Work ==
Birmingham approaches contracts and damage measures from a law and economics standpoint. The first systematic statement of the efficiency of expectation damages to appear in the legal literature was that of Professor Birmingham, in his article Breach of Contract, Damage Measures, and Economic Efficiency, 24 Rutgers L. Rev. 273 (1970). Illustrative is Birmingham's following statement in that piece: "Although choice among Pareto optimal states requires appeal to subjective values, the superiority of at least one such state over any given state outside the set may be defended as almost tautological." Since that time, contract scholarship has increasingly adopted economic perspectives. In the abstract for Damage Measure and Economic Rationality: The Geometry of Contract Law, Birmingham writes "The question of damage measures presented by the conscious decision of a promisor to breach a losing contract raises one of the most perplexing conceptual problems in contract law. Recognizing the present inability of the courts rationally to resolve the problem, as illustrated by the opposing decisions in Groves v. John Wunder Company and Peevyhouse v. Garland Coal and Mining Company, the author undertakes to examine the premises of contract law with a fresh perspective-economic analysis." It is precisely this "fresh perspective" of "economic analysis" that pervades and infuses much of this legal theory and is one of his biggest contributions to the legal world. At the same time, however, one would be wise not to overlook Birmingham's further remarks, now issuing some twenty years after Breach of Contract, Damage Measures, and Economic Efficiency: "Scholarship about contracts suffers too, however, under our hypothetical hegemony of economics. There are no more revolutions for us, no new paradigms. Starting with our single rule, we practice Kuhnian normal science, writing successive articles showing that rule X, rule Y, etc. of contract law are efficient. This practice is useful and necessary but unheroic; our physics-envy is of Newton not of some anonymous technician."

== Select publications ==
The following is a list of Birmingham's Publications:

=== Books ===
- Reliance, in The Palgrave Dictionary of Economics and the Law, Vol. 3, 294-300 (1998).

=== Journal articles ===
- 417 citations: Breach of contract, damage measures, and economic efficiency.
- 88 citations: Damage Measures and Economic Rationality: The Geometry of Contract Law.
- 52 citations: Legal and moral duty in game theory: common law contract and Chinese analogies.
- Recent Developments in Evidence Law, 34 Journal of Maritime Law and Commerce 1 (2003) [with Tara Shaw and Carolyn Shields].
- Daubert, Proof of a Prior, and the Soliton: Bernert Towboat Co. v. USS CHANDLER (DDG996), 34 Journal of Maritime Law and Commerce 173 (2003) [with Tara Shaw and Carolyn Shields].
- Economic Integration in East Africa: Distribution of Gains, 9 Virginia Journal of International Law 408 (1969).
- The Growth of the Law: Decision Theory and the Doctrine of Consideration, 55 Archive and Social Philosophy 467 (1969).
- Legal and Moral Duty in Game Theory: Common Law Contract and Chinese Analogies, 18 Buffalo Law Review 99 (1969) (excerpted in The Economics of Contract Law (1979)).
- The Prisoner's Dilemma and Mutual Trust: Comment, 79 Ethics 156 (1969).
- Integration and Economic Development, 1965 Villanova Law Forum 781 (1965).
- The War Crimes Trial: A Second Look, 24 University of Pittsburgh Law Review 132 (1962).

=== Reviews ===
- Book Review, AA Nice Book, 23 Connecticut Law Review 1029 (1991) (reviewing Richard A. Posner, Cardozo: A Study in Reputation (1990)) [with Sharon Jones].
- Book Review, 69 Boston University Law Review 435 (1989) (reviewing P.S. Atiyah, Essays on Contract (1986)).
- Book Review, 13 Villanova Law Review 884 (1968) (reviewing J. Cohen, The Criminal Process in the People's Republic of China (1968)).
- Book Review, 21 Stanford Law Review 201 (1968) (reviewing D. Bodde & C. Morris, Law in Imperial China (1967)).
- Book Review, 25 University of Pittsburgh Law Review 623 (1964) (reviewing E. Stein & P. Hay, Cases and Materials on the Law and Institutions of the Atlantic Area (1963)).
