= Alexandra Davis DiPentima =

American judge (born 1953)

Chief Judge of the Connecticut Appellate Court
- In office May 13, 2011 – July 31, 2020
- Succeeded by: William H. Bright Jr.

Judge of the Connecticut Appellate Court
- In office 1993 – July 31, 2020
- Appointed by: Lowell P. Weicker Jr.
- Succeeded by: Joan K. Alexander

Personal details
- Born: Alexandra Davis DiPentima; April 18, 1953 (age 73) Sharon, Connecticut, U.S.
- Education: Princeton University (BA); University of Connecticut (JD)

Alexandra Davis DiPentima (born April 18, 1953) is a former judge and chief judge of the Connecticut Appellate Court.

== Early life and education ==
DiPentima graduated from Kent School in Kent, Connecticut in 1971. She earned a Bachelor of Arts in intellectual property from Princeton University in 1975 and her Juris Doctor from University of Connecticut School of Law in 1979. She was admitted into the Connecticut bar in 1979, United States District Court in 1980, the United States Court of Appeals in 1983 and the United States Supreme Court Bar in 1987.

From 1979 until 1981 she worked with Connecticut Legal Services dealing with low income domestic and property issues. She then joined the firm of Moller, Horton & Fineberg, P.C. In 1993, she was appointed to the superior court. She assumed senior status on July 31, 2020.
