= Christine Keller =

Judge of the Connecticut Appellate Court

Senior Justice of the Connecticut Supreme Court
- Incumbent
- Assumed office March 31, 2022

Associate Justice of the Connecticut Supreme Court
- In office July 20, 2020 – March 31, 2022
- Appointed by: Ned Lamont
- Preceded by: Richard N. Palmer
- Succeeded by: Joan K. Alexander

Personal details
- Born: Christine Elyse Keller; October 6, 1952 (age 73)
- Spouse: Thomas D. Ritter
- Education: Smith College (BA); University of Connecticut (JD)

Christine Elyse Keller (born October 6, 1952) is an American lawyer and judge from Connecticut. She is a Senior Justice of the Connecticut Supreme Court.

== Education ==
Keller received her Bachelor of Arts degree from Smith College and her Juris Doctor from the University of Connecticut School of Law.

== Legal career ==
She practiced family, personal injury, and real estate law at Neighborhood Legal Services in Hartford, Connecticut, and subsequently worked at the Office of the Corporation Counsel for the City of Hartford and the law firm of Ritter and Keller.

== State judicial service ==
=== Administrative judge ===
In 2005, she was appointed Administrative Judge for the Judicial District of Hartford, a position she held until 2007, when she was reappointed a second time as Chief Administrative Judge for Juvenile Matters, a position she held until 2012.

=== Connecticut Appellate Court ===
On January 24, 2013, Keller was nominated by Governor Dan Malloy to be a judge of the Appellate Court; the General Assembly approved her nomination on March 6, 2013. She succeed Carmen E. Espinosa, who was nominated to the Connecticut Supreme Court. She was a Superior Court Judge, having been appointed by Governor Lowell P. Weicker Jr. in 1993, and a Family Support Magistrate, having been appointed by Governor William A. O’Neill in 1989.

=== Connecticut Supreme Court ===
On July 20, 2020, Governor Ned Lamont announced the appointment of Keller to the seat on the Connecticut Supreme Court vacated by Richard N. Palmer who retired on May 27, 2020 after reaching mandatory retirement age 70. In advance of her 70th birthday, she announced on December 28, 2021, that she would take senior status, effective March 31, 2022.

== Personal life ==
Keller is married to lobbyist and former state house speaker Thomas D. Ritter, and the mother of incumbent state house speaker Matthew Ritter.

Legal offices
Preceded by Richard N. Palmer	Associate Justice of the Connecticut Supreme Court; 2020–2022	Succeeded by Joan K. Alexander
