= Jeremy R. Paul =

American lawyer

Dean of Northeastern University School of Law
- In office August 2012 – June 2018
- Preceded by: Emily Spieler
- Succeeded by: James Hackney

Personal details
- Born: July 22, 1956 New York, New York
- Spouse: Laurel Leff
- Education: Princeton University, (A.B., 1978); Harvard Law School, (J.D., 1981).

Jeremy R. Paul (born July 22, 1956), is an American lawyer and law professor who was the Dean of Northeastern University School of Law from 2012 until June 2018.

== Education ==
Paul graduated from Princeton University in 1978 and received his Juris Doctor degree from Harvard in 1981.

== Career ==
Jeremy Paul joined the Northeastern University School of Law faculty as dean in 2012. He teaches Constitutional Law, Property and Jurisprudence. A 1978 graduate of Princeton University, he received his Juris Doctor degree from Harvard in 1981. Before coming to Northeastern, Dean Paul served for 23 years on the faculty of the University of Connecticut School of Law, where he was Dean and Thomas F. Gallivan, Jr. Professor of Real Property Law from 2007 until 2012. Dean Paul served as associate dean for academic affairs at UConn Law from 1999 until 2004, when he was named associate dean for research. Dean Paul previously served as a law clerk to Judge Irving Robert Kaufman of the U.S. Court of Appeals for the Second Circuit; as Professor-in-Residence at the Appellate Staff of the Civil Division of the U.S. Department of Justice and as Assistant to the President of TravelersGroup. Paul has taught at the University of Miami as both assistant and associate professor, and at Boston College Law School as a visiting professor.

== Writings ==
Dean Paul's writings have appeared in the Texas Law Review, the Michigan Law Review, the University of Southern California Law Review, and the Washington Monthly. His writings include (with Michael Fischl) the book Getting to Maybe: How to Excel on Law School Exams and a widely used introduction to legal reasoning titled "A Bedtime Story."

Dean Paul has served on the Board of Directors of the Connecticut Bar Foundation and the Advisory Board of the Connecticut Law Tribune. He is also a former Board Member of the Connecticut Civil Liberties Union.
