= University of Connecticut School of Law =

Law school of the University of Connecticut

Coordinates: 41.7731°N 72.7076°W

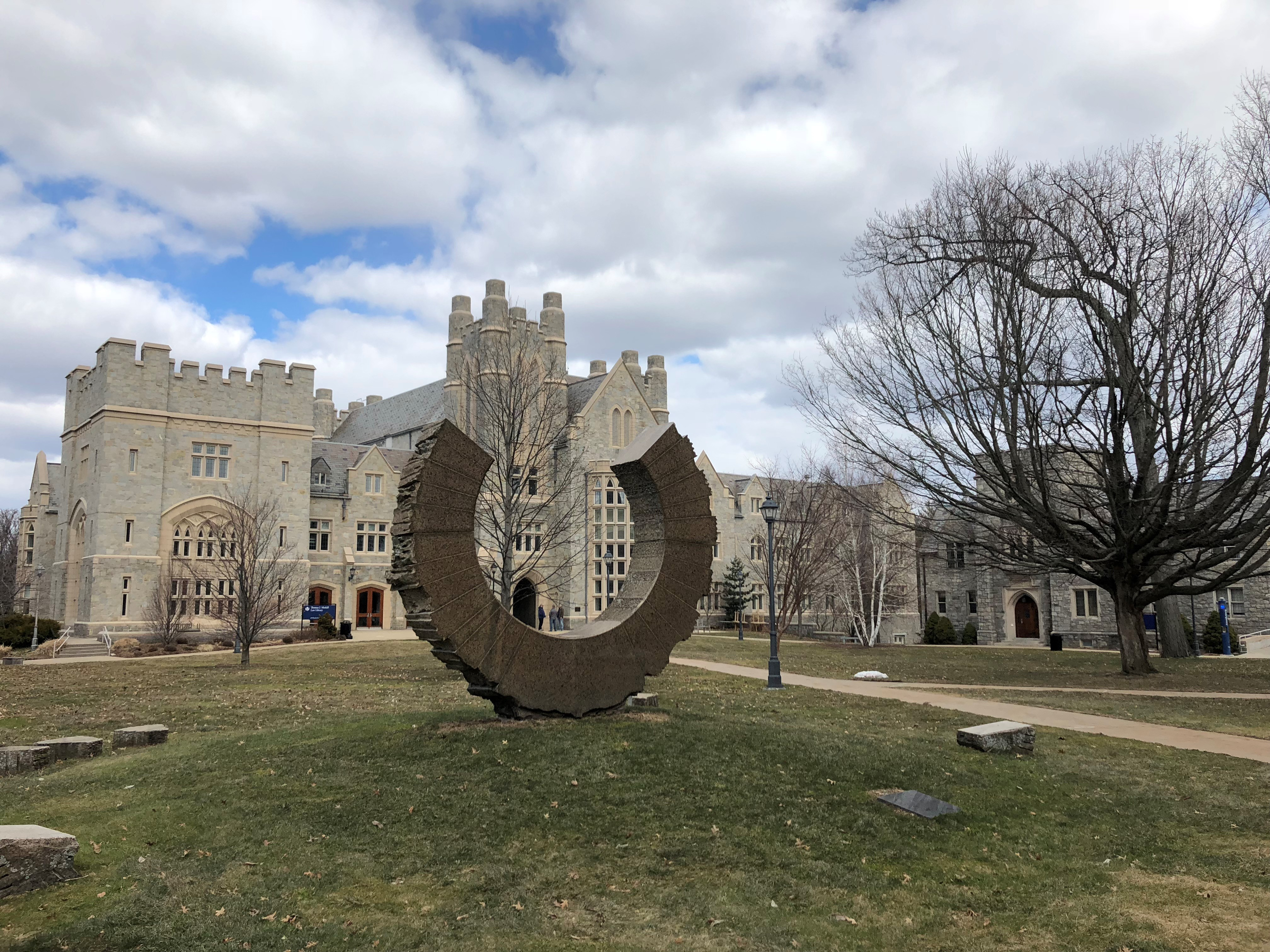
- Thomas J. Meskill Law Library
- Parent school: University of Connecticut
- Established: 1921
- School type: Public law school
- Dean: Eboni S. Nelson
- Location: Hartford, Connecticut, United States
- Enrollment: 488
- Faculty: 129
- USNWR ranking: 55th (tie) (2024)
- Bar pass rate: 95.73% (2020)
- Website: www.law.uconn.edu
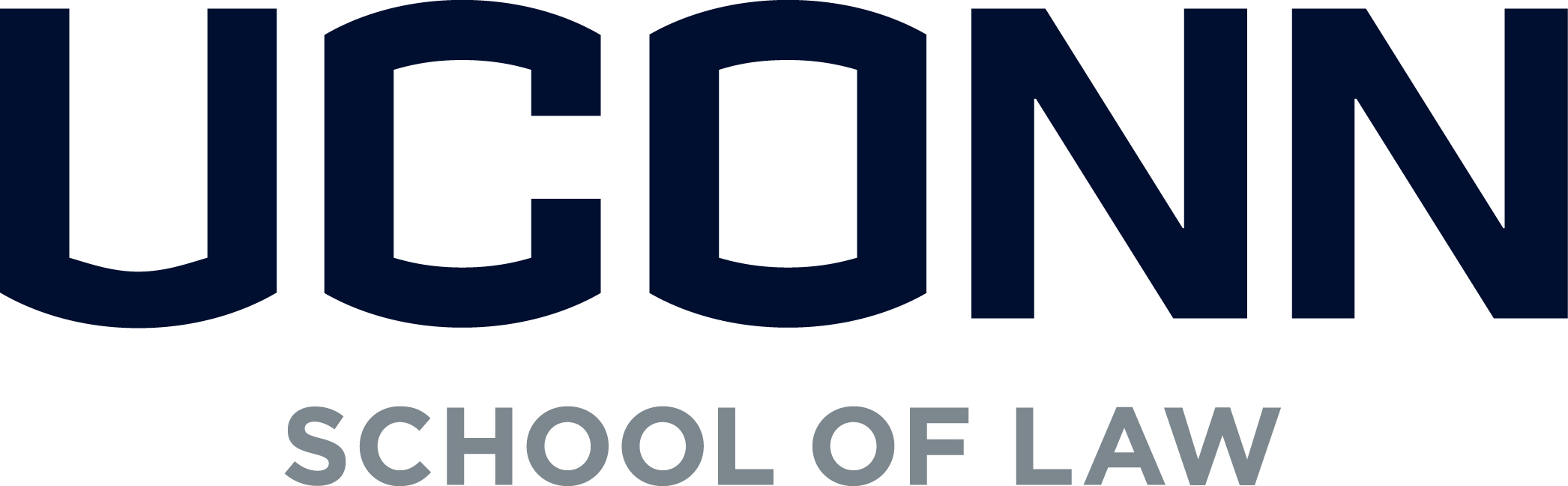

The University of Connecticut School of Law (UConn Law) is the law school associated with the University of Connecticut and located in Hartford, Connecticut. It is the only public law school in Connecticut and one of only four public law schools in New England. As of 2020, it enrolled 488 students.

== Background ==
Founded in 1921 as the Hartford College of Law, the law school is accredited by the American Bar Association, and is a member of the Association of American Law Schools. In 1948 it affiliated with the University of Connecticut, now ranked among the top 25 public research universities nationally. The law school's Collegiate Gothic-style buildings were constructed in 1925, with the exception of the Thomas J. Meskill Law Library, which was completed in 1996. The campus housed the Hartford Seminary until 1981 and is listed on the National Register of Historic Places.

== Academics ==
In addition to the Juris Doctor (JD) degree, the law school offers several joint degrees, combining a Juris Doctor degree with a Master of Laws, Master of Business Administration, Master of Public Affairs Administration, Master of Public Health, or Master of Social Work. UConn Law offers LLM degrees in Energy and Environmental Law, Human Rights and Social Justice, U.S. Legal Studies and Insurance Law—the only LLM program in insurance law in the United States. UConn Law also offers the SJD (Doctor of the Science of Laws) degree and a professional certificate in corporate and regulatory compliance.

JD and LLM candidates may pursue certificates in Corporate and Regulatory Compliance, Energy and Environmental Law, Human Rights, Intellectual Property, and Tax Studies. JD candidates may also earn certificates in Insurance Law and Regulation, Law and Public Policy, and Transactional Practice. LLM candidates may also pursue a certificate in Financial Services or one of four Foundational Certificates in U.S. Law.

In addition, UConn Law offers 19 clinics and field placement programs that provide hands-on, practical training to upper-level students who earn up to 10 credits for their work. These clinics include Animal Law, Asylum and Human Rights, Energy and Environmental Law, Children's Advocacy, Criminal, Intellectual Property and Entrepreneurship Law, Mediation, U.S. Attorney's, and Tax clinics. Seminars in a multitude of different substantive areas are available to upper-level students for about 3 credits. Internships and field work are available to upper-level students. Research positions are open to upper-level students under the direction of a faculty adviser.

== Library ==
The 120,000-square-foot (11,000 m^{2}) Thomas J. Meskill Law Library is one of the largest law libraries in the country and houses the most comprehensive collection of insurance materials in the country. The Law Library has access to hundreds of electronic databases, including Westlaw, Lexis and Bloomberg. It has five classrooms, 12 group study rooms, an adaptive technology study room, a meditation room, a café, two student lounges, and 285 study carrels, with total seating for 964. The Law Library works closely with the University of Connecticut Libraries, which form the largest public research collection in the state of Connecticut. The main library is the Homer D. Babbidge Library at the Storrs campus.

== Law journals and publications ==
UConn Law students produce four scholarly journals: the Connecticut Law Review, the Connecticut Public Interest Law Journal, the Connecticut Insurance Law Journal, and the Connecticut Journal of International Law.

The Connecticut Law Review is the oldest, largest, and most active student-run publication at the School of Law.

The Connecticut Public Interest Law Journal is a student-run biannual law review published by the school. It was established in 2001 and is abstracted and indexed in HeinOnline. Every fall, the journal hosts a symposium on issues related to public interest law.

The Connecticut Journal of International Law is a biannual student-edited law review covering international and comparative law. It has published by the school since 1985. The journal sponsors an annual symposium. It is abstracted and indexed in EBSCO and ProQuest databases as well as in HeinOnline.

The Insurance Law Review is a quarterly law review covering insurance law. It was established in 1994. The journal is abstracted and indexed in HeinOnline, EBSCO and ProQuest databases, the Index to Legal Periodicals & Books, and the Emerging Sources Citation Index.

== Admission ==
According to the University of Connecticut's official 2021 ABA-required Standard 509 Information Report, the university offered admission to 28.79 percent of JD applicants. For the 2021 first-year class, the University of Connecticut School of Law received 1,754 completed applications and offered admission to 505 applicants, of which 144 enrolled.

LSAT	All	Full Time	Part Time
75th Percentile	161	161	160
50th Percentile	159	159	155
25th Percentile	156	157	152

UPGA	All	Full Time	Part Time
75th Percentile	3.71	3.70	3.78
50th Percentile	3.54	3.54	3.37
25th Percentile	3.28	3.28	3.09

== Employment ==
91.61% of UConn Law's Class of 2017 passed a bar examination within two years.

Ten months after graduation, 90.4% of the Class of 2019 was employed, with 72% obtaining Bar Passage Required employment (employment as an attorney). University of Connecticut's Law School Transparency under-employment score is 9.6%, indicating the percentage of the Class of 2021 unemployed, pursuing an additional degree, or working in a non-professional, short-term, or part-time job nine months after graduation.

== Faculty ==
Thirteen members of the full-time faculty hold doctoral degrees. Notable faculty members include:

- Loftus Becker, Professor Emeritus
- Robert L. Birmingham, Professor of Law
- Timothy Fisher, Dean Emeritus and Professor of Law
- James Kwak, Professor of Law
- Peter Lindseth, Olimpiad S. Ioffe Professor of International and Comparative Law
- Thomas Morawetz, Tapping Reeve Professor of Law and Ethics
- Steven Wilf, Anthony J. Smits Professor of Global Commerce

== Notable alumni ==
- Bethany J. Alvord, 1982, Judge of the Connecticut Appellate Court
- Elizabeth B. Amato, 1982, senior vice president at United Technologies Corporation
- Bessye Anita Warren Bennett, 1973, the first African American woman to practice law in Connecticut
- Francisco L. Borges, 1978, former Connecticut State Treasurer and managing partner of Landmark Partners
- Leonard C. Boyle, 1983, Deputy Chief State's Attorney (Operations) for the State of Connecticut; Chief, Criminal Division at the U.S. Attorney's Office for the District of Connecticut (1999-2004); Commissioner of the State of Connecticut Department of Public Safety (2004-2007); Director of the FBI's Terrorist Screening Center (2007-2009)
- Natalie Braswell, 2007, Connecticut State Comptroller (2021-present); first African American to serve in that office
- Vanessa Lynne Bryant, 1978, U.S. District Judge for the United States District Court for the District of Connecticut
- Justin Clark, 2004, Deputy Assistant to the President and White House Director of Public Liaison.
- Eric D. Coleman, 1977, Deputy President pro tempore in the Connecticut Senate.
- Joe Courtney, 1978, U.S. Representative for Connecticut's Second District
- Alfred V. Covello, 1960, Senior U.S. District Judge for the United States District Court for the District of Connecticut
- Bill Curry, 1977, political analyst and journalist; two-time Democratic nominee for Governor of Connecticut; White House advisor in the administration of Bill Clinton
- Emilio Q. Daddario, 1942, U.S. Representative for Connecticut's First Congressional District (1959-1971)
- John A. Danaher III, 1980, Judge of the Connecticut Superior Court; Commissioner, Connecticut Department of Public Safety (2007-2010); U.S. Attorney for the District of Connecticut (2001-2002)
- Gregory D'Auria, 1988, Associate Justice of the Connecticut Supreme Court (2017–present); Solicitor General and Associate Attorney General of the State of Connecticut (2011-2017)
- Robert M. DeCrescenzo, 1988, Shareholder at Updike, Kelly & Spellacy, P.C.; Mayor of East Hartford, Connecticut (1993-1997)
- Alexandra Davis DiPentima, 1979, Chief Judge of the Connecticut Appellate Court
- Kari A. Dooley, 1988, Judge of the United States District Court for the District of Connecticut
- Christopher F. Droney, 1979, U.S. Circuit Judge for the U.S. Court of Appeals for the Second Circuit
- Dennis G. Eveleigh, 1972, Associate Justice of the Connecticut Supreme Court
- J. Michael Farren, 1982, Deputy White House Counsel to President George W. Bush, convicted of attempted murder
- C. Frank Figliuzzi, 1987, assistant director of the Federal Bureau of Investigation Counterintelligence Division (2011-2012)
- Robert Giaimo, 1943, U.S. Representative for Connecticut's Third Congressional District (1959-1981)
- Mary Glassman, 1986, First Selectman of Simsbury, Connecticut
- Bernard F. Grabowski, 1952, U.S. Representative from Connecticut (1963-1967)
- Constance Belton Green, 1972, college administrator and first African American alumna
- Eunice Groark, 1965, Lieutenant Governor of Connecticut (1991-1995)
- F. Herbert Gruendel, 1984, Judge of the Connecticut Appellate Court
- Lubbie Harper Jr., 1975, Justice of the Connecticut Supreme Court
- Francis X. Hennessy, 1961, Deputy Chief Court Administrator and Judge of the Connecticut Appellate Court
- Wesley W. Horton, 1970, appellate attorney who argued Kelo v. New London on behalf of the New London before the U.S. Supreme Court and partner at Horton, Shields & Knox, P.C.
- Denise R. Johnson, 1974, First woman appointed to the Vermont Supreme Court
- Joette Katz, 1972, Associate Justice of the Connecticut Supreme Court (1992-2011)
- Christine E. Keller, 1977, Judge of the Connecticut Appellate Court
- Edward Kennedy, Jr., 1997, Member of the Connecticut Senate representing the 12th Senate District; Member at Epstein Becker & Green, P.C.
- Robert M. Langer, 1973, head of Wiggin and Dana LLP's Antitrust and Consumer Protection Practice Group
- Douglas S. Lavine, 1977, Judge of the Connecticut Appellate Court
- William C. Leary, member of the Connecticut House of Representatives
- Richard Lehr, 1984, veteran journalist, author, and Professor of Journalism at Boston University
- Thomas Leonardi, 1954, former Connecticut's Insurance Commissioner and insurance executive
- Martin Looney, 1985, Majority Leader, Connecticut Senate
- Konstantina Lukes, 1966, Mayor of Worcester, Massachusetts (2007-2010)
- Robert J. Lynn, 1975, Chief Justice of the New Hampshire Supreme Court
- Joan G. Margolis, 1978, U.S. Magistrate Judge for the United States District Court for the District of Connecticut
- Seth Marnin, 2006, judge for the New York Court of Claims and first openly transgender male judge in the United States
- Donna F. Martinez, 1978, U.S. Magistrate Judge for the United States District Court for the District of Connecticut
- Andrew J. McDonald, 1991, Associate Justice of the Connecticut Supreme Court (2013–present); Member of the Connecticut Senate representing the 27th Senate District (2003-2011)
- Thomas Joseph Meskill, 1956, Chief Judge of the U.S. Court of Appeals for the Second Circuit (1992-1993); Governor of Connecticut (1971-1975); U.S. Representative for Connecticut's Sixth Congressional District (1967-1971)
- Chris Murphy, 2002, U.S. Senator from Connecticut
- Kathleen Murphy, 1987, President, Fidelity Personal Investing, a unit of Fidelity Investments; former chief executive officer of ING U.S. Wealth Management; named to Fortune Magazine's 50 Most Powerful Women in Business List
- John Garvan Murtha, 1968, Judge of the United States District Court for the District of Vermont, Chief Judge (1995-2002)
- Kevin J. O'Connor, 1992, Associate Attorney General of the United States (2008-2009); U.S. Attorney for District of Connecticut (2002-2006)
- Richard N. Palmer, 1977, Associate Justice of the Connecticut Supreme Court
- Michele Pearce, 1996, Acting General Counsel of the Department of the Army
- Randall Pinkston, 1980, CBS News Correspondent
- Lewis Rome, 1957, Connecticut State Senate leader and chair of the UConn Board of Trustees
- James O. Ruane, 1994, criminal defense lawyer
- Ronald A. Sarasin, 1963, U.S. Representative for Connecticut's Fifth Congressional District (1973-1979)
- Pedro Segarra, 1985, Mayor of Hartford, Connecticut (2010-2015)
- Mickey Sherman, 1971, criminal defense attorney who represented Michael Skakel
- William St. Onge, 1948, U.S. Representative for Connecticut's Second Congressional District (1963-1970)
- Kevin Sullivan, 1982, Connecticut's 86th Lieutenant Governor, served as Senate President Pro Tempore from 1997 - 2004 in the Connecticut Senate
- Christine S. Vertefeuille, 1975, Senior Associate Justice of the Connecticut Supreme Court
- Ariane D. Vuono, 1984, Associate Justice of the Massachusetts Appeals Court
- Terence S. Ward, 1982, Federal Defender for the District of Connecticut
- William A. Webb, 1974, U.S. Magistrate Judge for the U.S. District Court for the Eastern District of North Carolina
- Dire Tladi, 2000, South African judge of the International Court of Justice (2024-present), member of the UN International Law Commission (2012-2022), professor of international law at the University of Pretoria.

== Deans of the School of Law ==
1. 1921—1933 George Lilliard
2. 1932—1933 Farrell Knapp
3. 1933—1934 Thomas A. Larremore
4. 1934—1942 Edward Graham Biard
5. 1942—1946 Laurence J. Ackerman
6. 1946—1966 Bert Earl Hopkins, J.S.D.
7. 1966—1967 Cornelius J. Scanlon (interim)
8. 1967—1972 Howard R. Sacks
9. 1972—1974 Francis C. Cady (interim)
10. 1974—1984 Phillip I. Blumberg
11. 1984—1990 George Schatzki
12. 1990—2000 Hugh C. Macgill
13. 2000—2006 Nell Jessup Newton
14. 2006—2007 Kurt A. Strasser (interim)
15. 2007—2012 Jeremy R. Paul
16. 2012—2013 Willajeanne F. McLean (interim)
17. 2013—2020 Timothy Fisher
18. 2020— Eboni Nelson

== Gallery ==
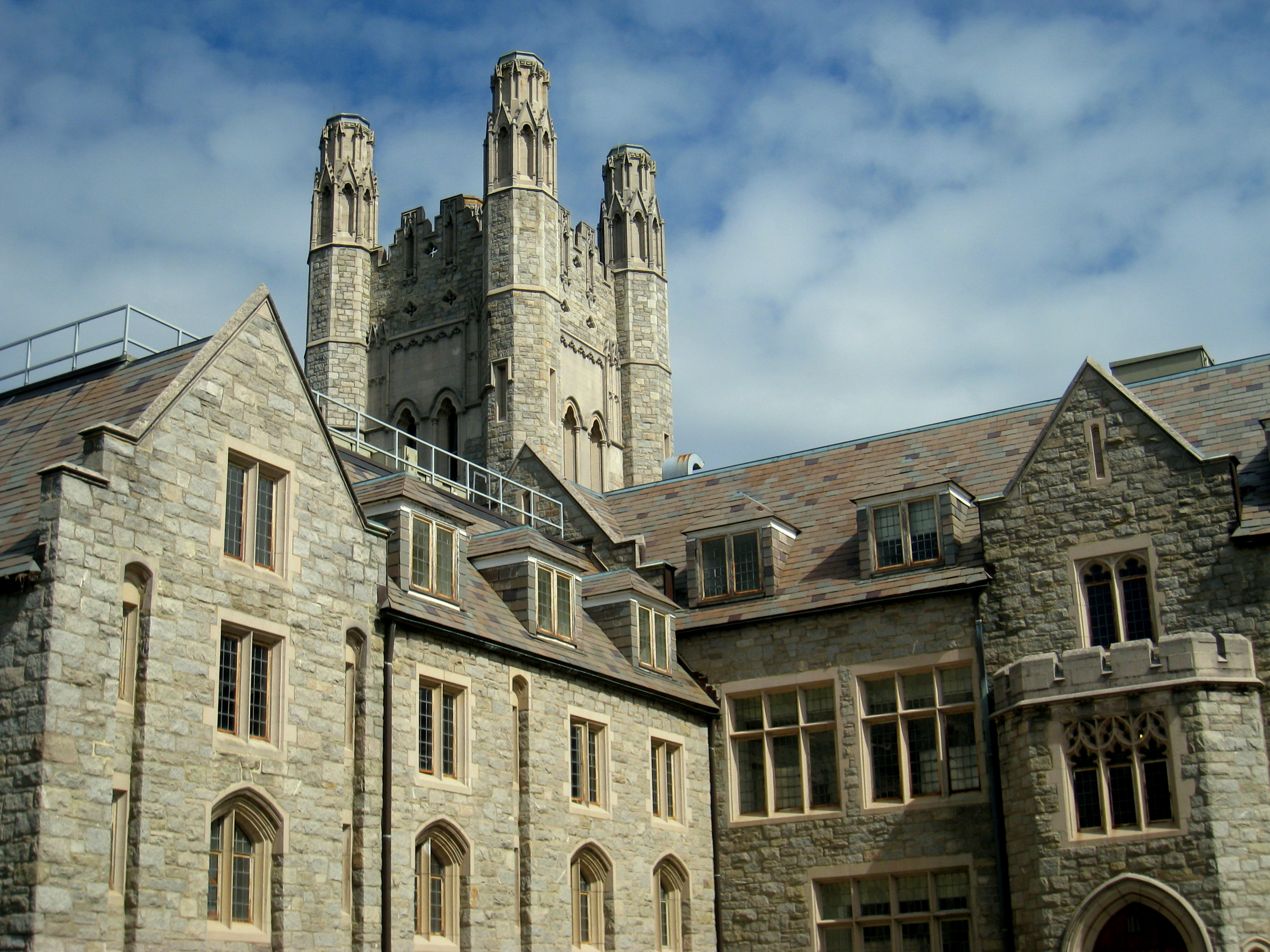

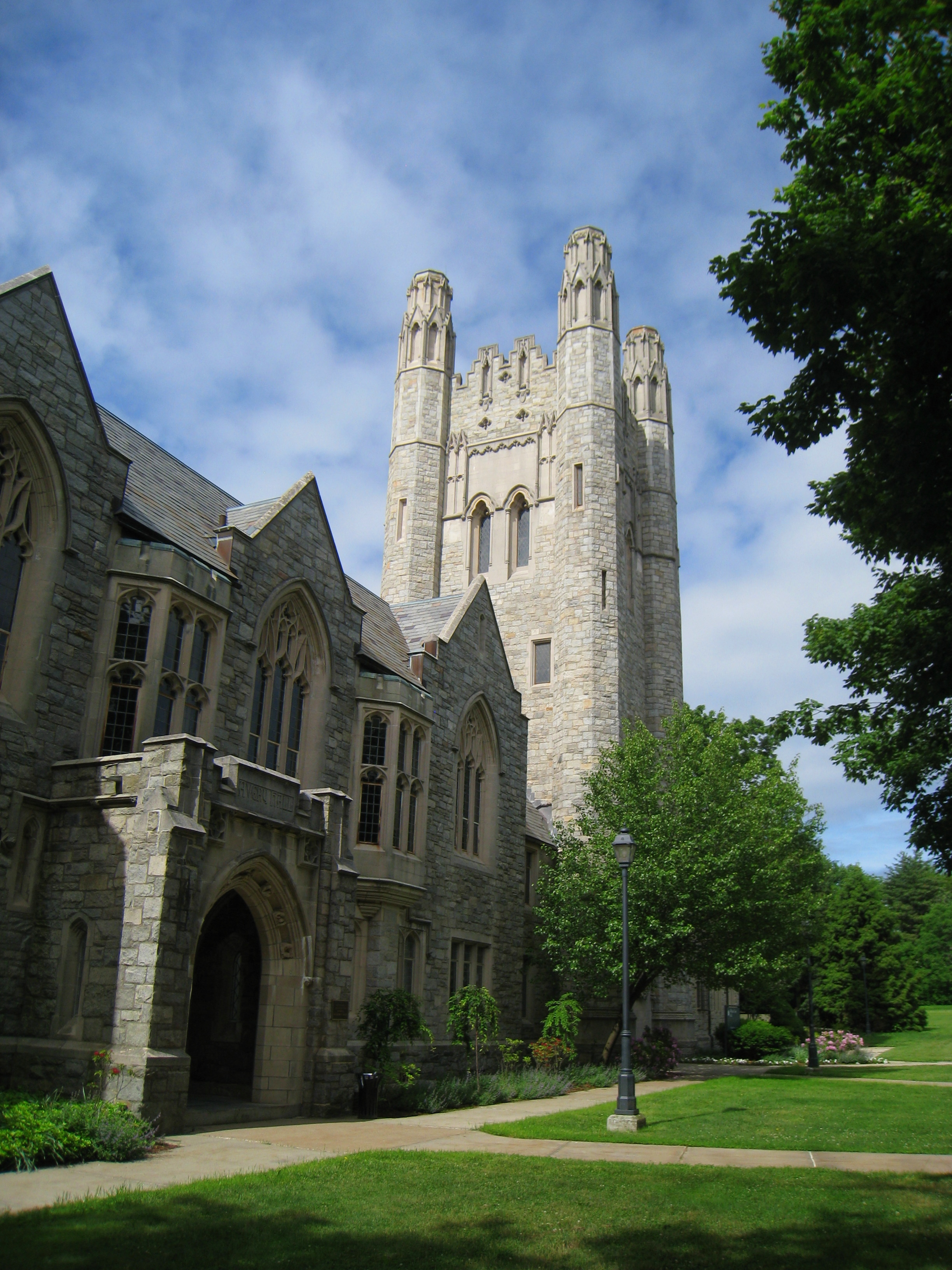

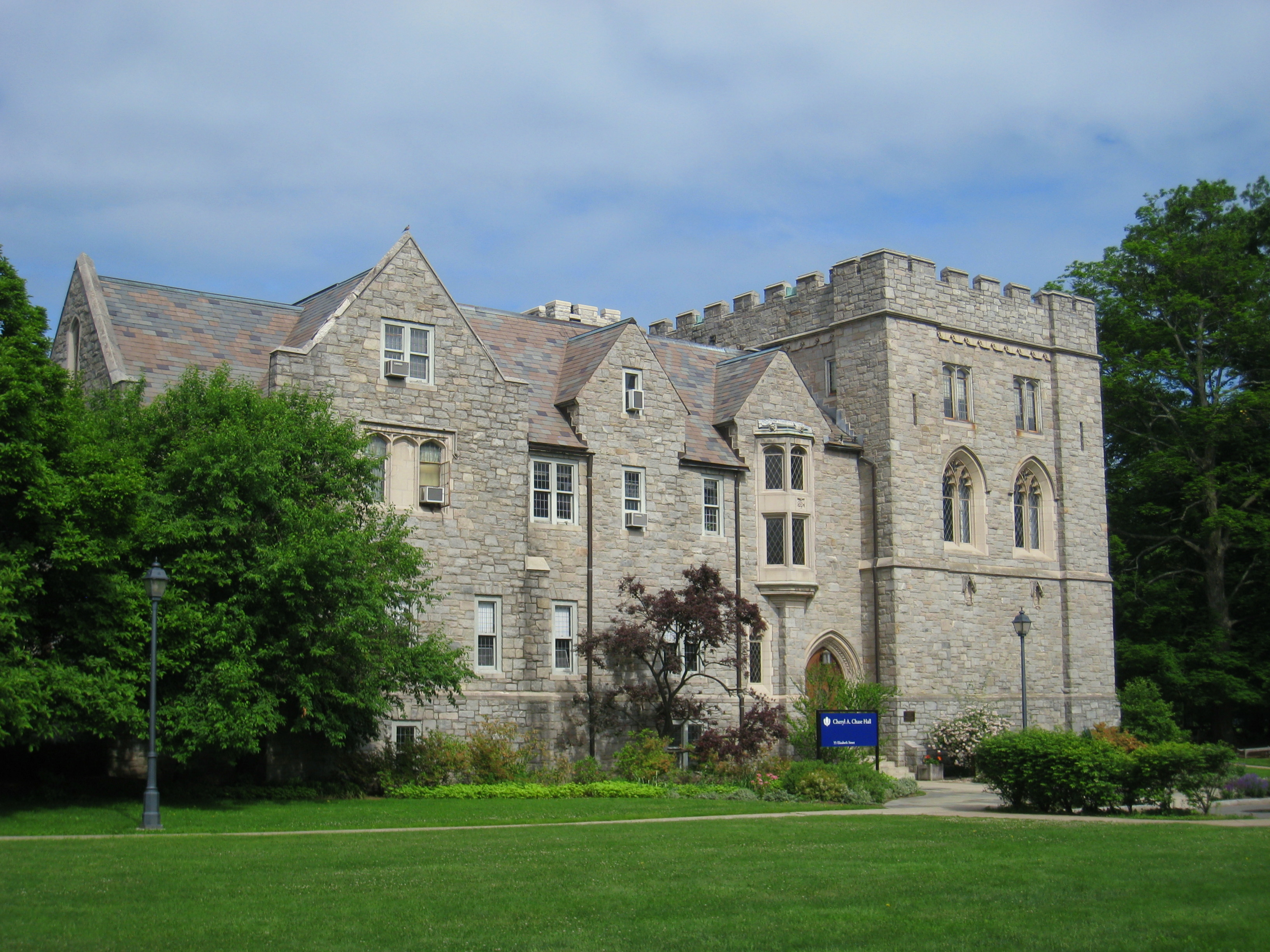

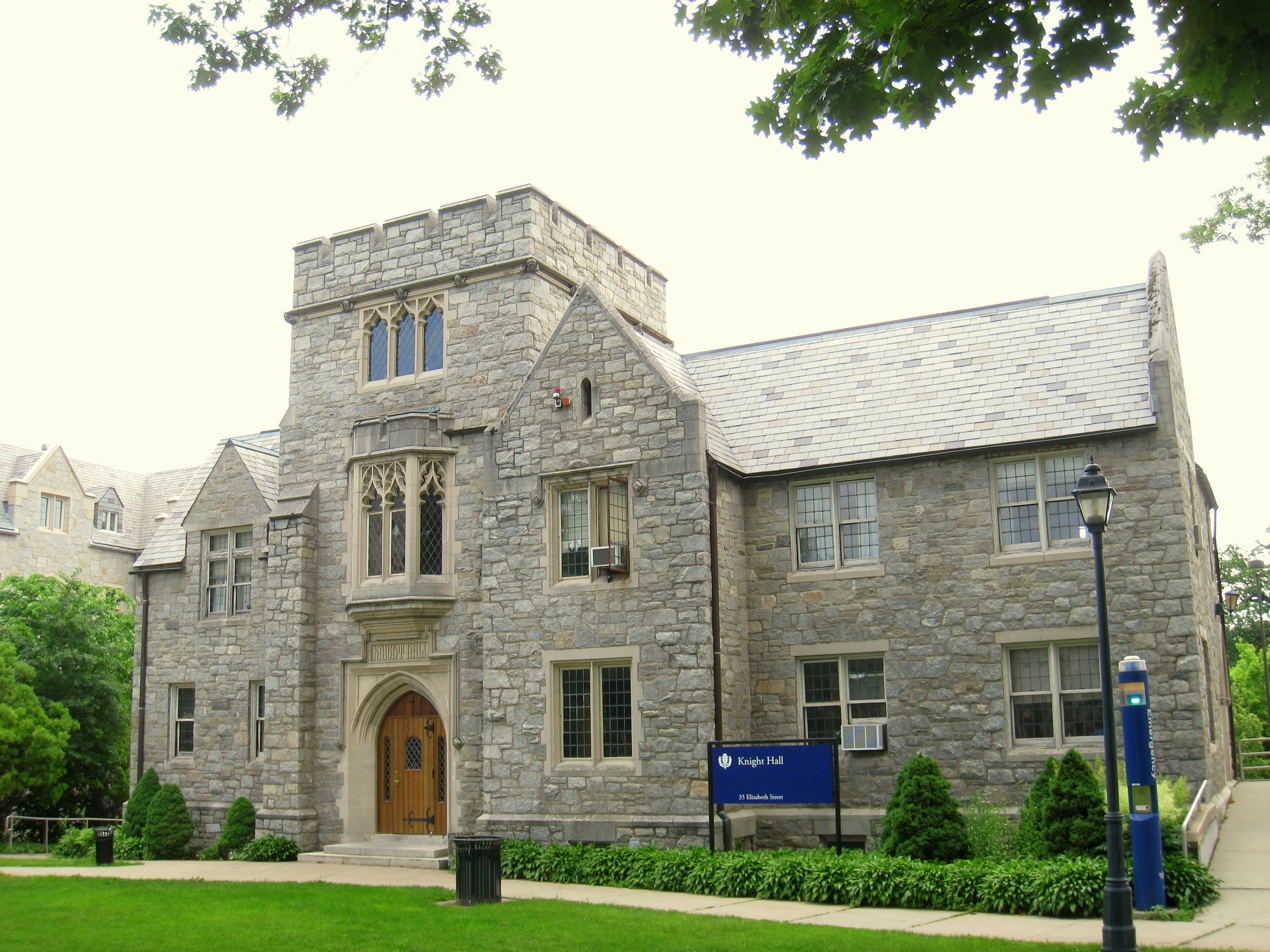

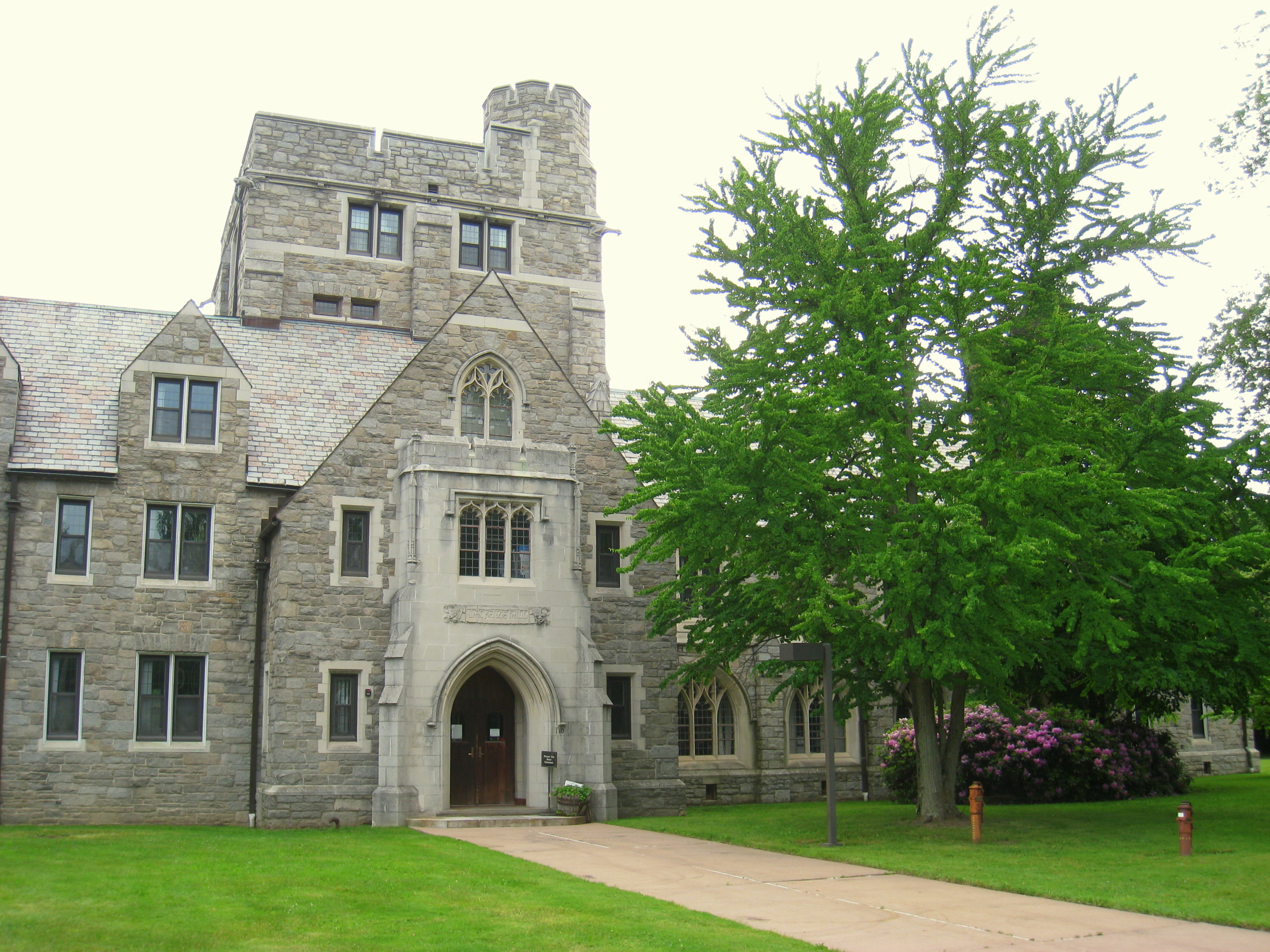

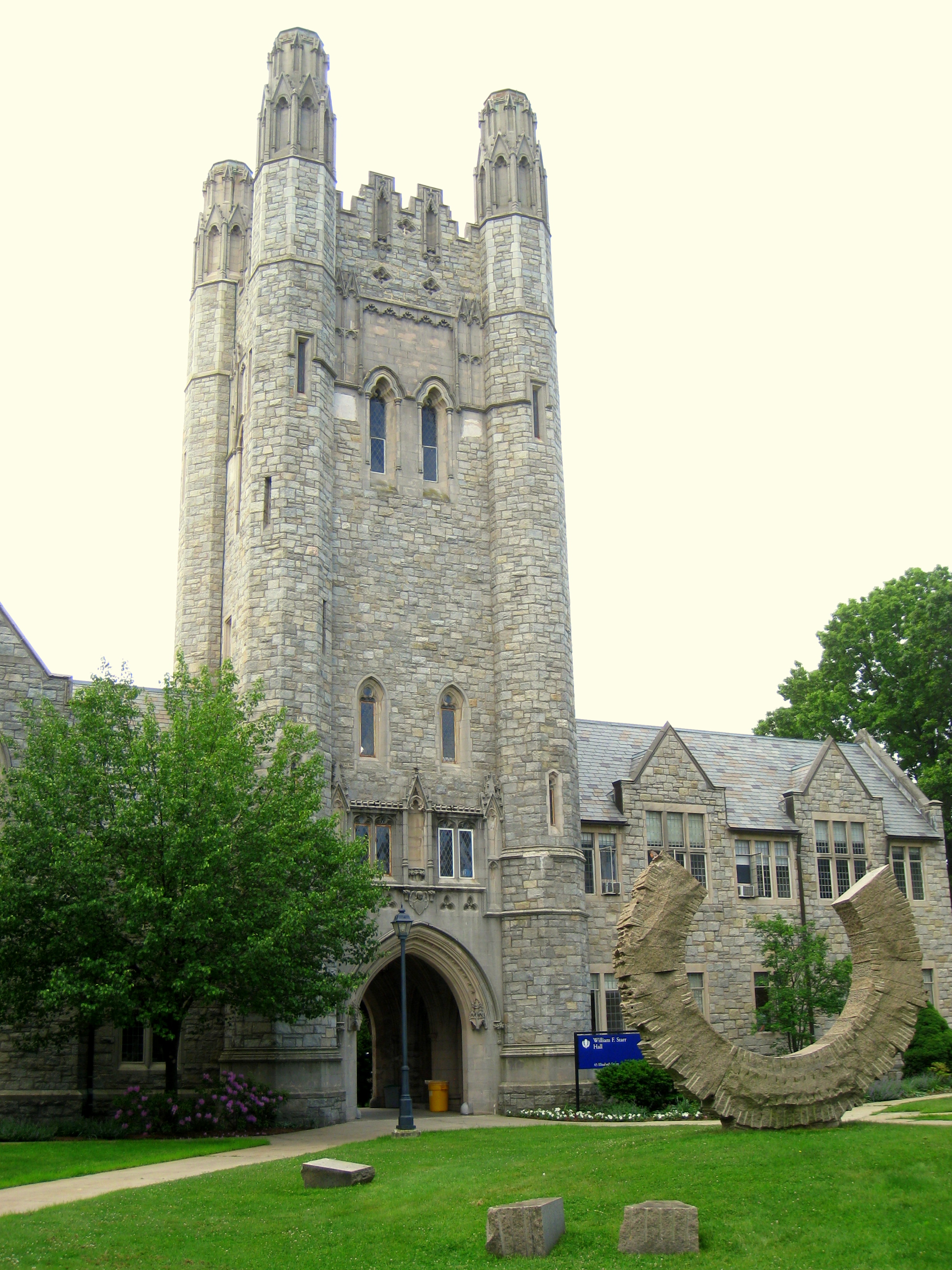

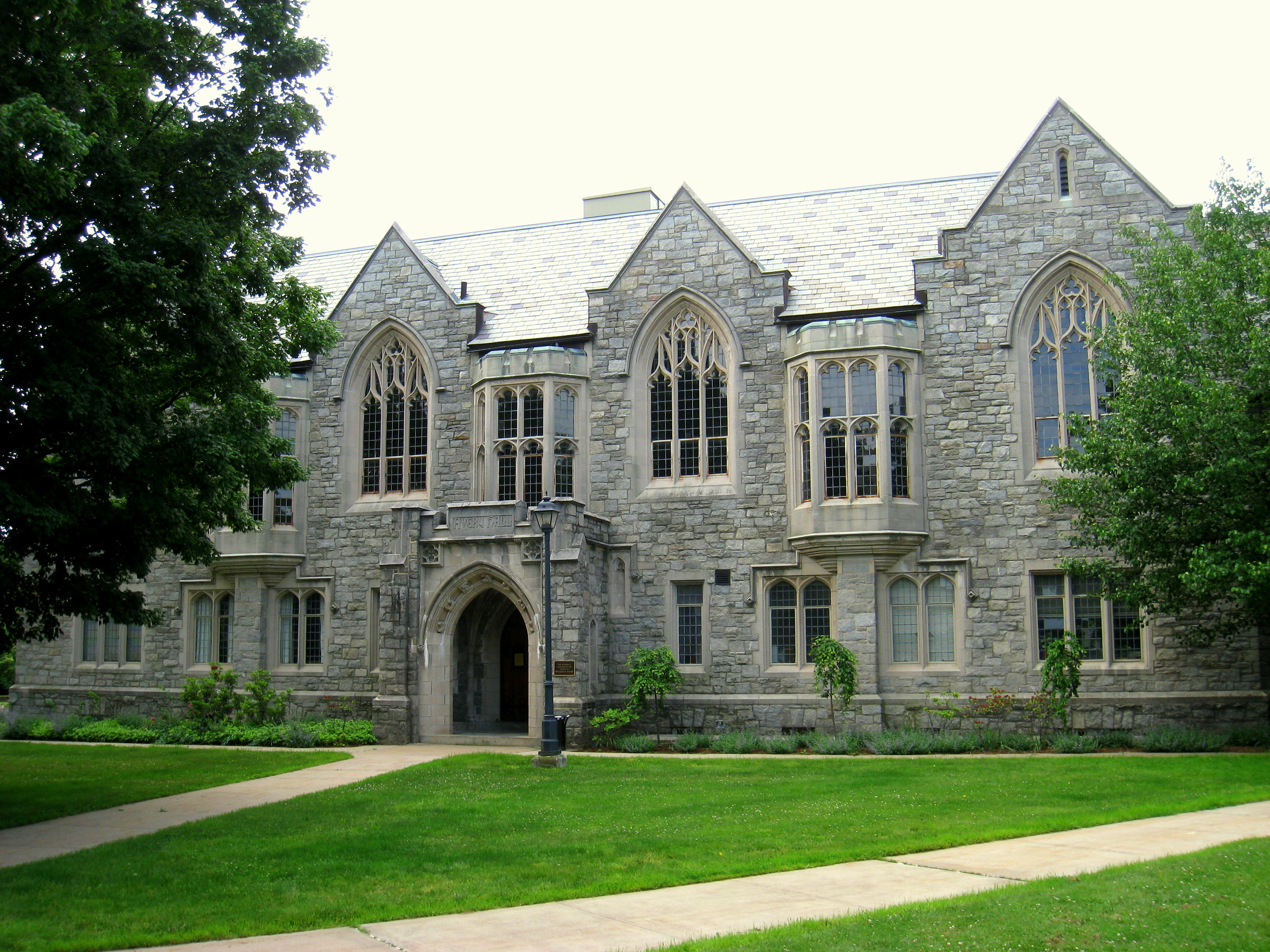

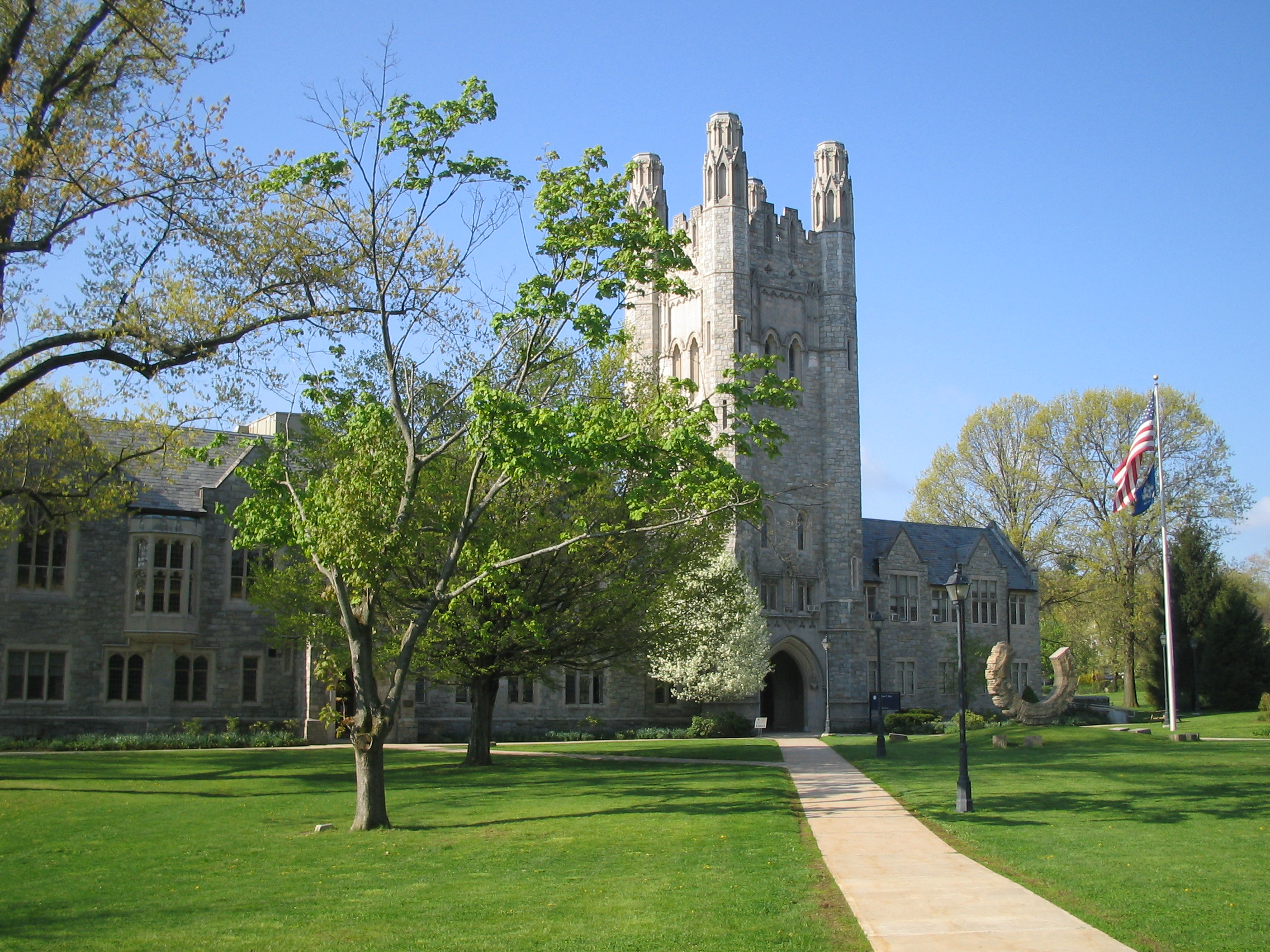

== See also ==
- National Register of Historic Places listings in Hartford, Connecticut
