= Connecticut Superior Court =

State trial court

The Connecticut Superior Court is the state trial court of general jurisdiction. It hears all matters other than those of original jurisdiction of the Probate Court and hears appeals from the Probate Court. The Superior Court has 13 judicial districts, each of which has at least one courthouse and one geographical area court. The Superior Court also has 10 juvenile matters courts where it has exclusive original jurisdiction over juveniles accused of delinquent acts. Civil cases, administrative appeals, family matters, and serious criminal offenses are generally heard in a judicial district courthouse. All criminal arraignments, misdemeanors, felonies, and motor vehicle violations that require a court appearance are heard in one of the 20 geographical area courts.

The court has four trial divisions: civil, criminal, family, and juvenile. The housing division is located in the Bridgeport, Hartford, New Haven, Stamford-Norwalk, and Waterbury judicial districts; in all other judicial districts, the cases of the housing division are heard in the civil division.

The court also has a specialized Complex Litigation Docket. These dockets are available in Hartford, Stamford, and Waterbury. There is no formula requiring assignment to this specialized docket, but it aims to hear challenging complex civil litigation that merits discretionary placement on this docket.

== History ==
The Superior Court was created after the Constitution of Connecticut was adopted in 1818. The Constitution created three separate branches of government, including a judiciary composed of "... a Supreme Court of Errors, a Superior Court, and such inferior courts as the general assembly shall from time to time ordain and establish. County courts were abolished in 1855, and their functions were transferred to a strengthened Superior Court.

As the volume of cases continued to increase, the Connecticut General Assembly found it necessary to create a series of Courts of Common Pleas. On July 1, 1978, the Court of Common Pleas and the Juvenile Court merged with the Superior Court. Common Pleas and Juvenile Court judges became judges of the Superior Court. The Superior Court thus became the sole trial court of general jurisdiction in the state, and Connecticut acquired the first unified state court system in the country.

== Districts ==
| Judicial District | Principal Courthouse(s) |
|---|---|
| Ansonia-Milford | Milford |
| Danbury | Danbury |
| Fairfield | Bridgeport |
| Hartford | Hartford |
| Litchfield | Torrington |
| Middlesex | Middletown |
| New Britain | New Britain |
| New Haven | New Haven, Meriden |
| New London | New London, Norwich |
| Stamford-Norwalk | Stamford |
| Tolland | Rockville |
| Waterbury | Waterbury |
| Windham | Putnam |

== See also ==
- Courts of Connecticut
