= Immigration Wars =

Book by Jeb Bush

Immigration Wars: Forging an American Solution
- First edition
- Author: Jeb Bush; Clint Bolick
- Language: English
- Publisher: Simon & Schuster
- Publication date: 2013
- ISBN: 1-4767-1345-6

Immigration Wars: Forging an American Solution is a 2013 non-fiction book about immigration in the United States co-written by Jeb Bush, who served as the governor of Florida from 1999 to 2007, and Clint Bolick, who serves as the vice president of litigation at the Goldwater Institute in Phoenix, Arizona.

== Background ==
The book was co-written by Jeb Bush and Clint Bolick. Bush is the son of the 41st president of the United States, George H. W. Bush and the brother of the 43rd president of the United States, George W. Bush. He served as the governor of Florida from 1999 to 2007. He is the founder and chairman of the Foundation for Florida's Future, a conservative think tank, and chairman of Foundation for Excellence in Education. Bolick is an attorney, former Libertarian candidate, and founder of the Institute for Justice, a libertarian public-interest law firm. He serves as the vice president of litigation at the Goldwater Institute, another conservative think tank in Phoenix, Arizona.

The book was announced in the fall of 2012 and released in March 2013 by Simon & Schuster.

== Content ==
The book starts with a preface written by Jeb Bush, followed by another preface written by Clint Bolick. In his, Bush reminds the reader that the issue of immigration is close to home for him, as his wife, Columba Bush, was born in Mexico. Bolick, on the other hand, explains that he often had to deal with immigration cases as an attorney.

- Chapter 1, 'A Proposal for Immigration Reform,' lays out a new vision for immigration policy, including encouraging a demand-driven system as opposed to national quotas, and teaching civics to new immigrants.
- Chapter 2, 'The Immigration Imperative,' argues that immigration is a positive good for the United States.
- Chapter 3, 'The Rule of Law.' talks about the necessity to enforce the law to legal immigrants.
- Chapter 4, 'An Enduring Debate,' presents a history of discrimination against immigrants to the United States, from the Germans to the Chinese.
- Chapter 5, 'The Human Dimension,' presents seven biographical sketches of immigrants who have lived the American Dream.
- Finally, Chapter 6, 'Immigration and Education,' is on education and immigration, and they champion charter schools and digital education.

The book ends with a "post-script", 'Postscript: A Prescription for Republicans.' It presents some advice to presidential candidate Mitt Romney, counseling him to be more pro-immigration.

== Promotional efforts ==
On March 4, 2013, Bush and Bolick gave a question-and-answer session about the book at the Manhattan Institute, a conservative think tank in New York City. They were introduced by Daniel Henninger, the Deputy Editorial Page Editor at The Wall Street Journal. The co-authors were also scheduled to appear at the Cato Institute, a libertarian think tank in Washington, D.C., on March 6, 2013, but their engagement was canceled due to "inclement weather." Later that month, Bush presented the book at the Ronald Reagan Presidential Library in Simi Valley, California. The talk was broadcast on C-SPAN's Book TV five times in March and April 2013. In November 2013, Bush talked about the book at the 92nd Street Y on the Upper East Side in New York City.

== Critical reception ==
Critical reception of the book in the press was mixed and at times controversial.

Prior to its release date, the Huffington Post published a review of the book written by a journalist who had read the book, suggesting Bush supported "self-deportation" even though he had derided presidential candidate Mitt Romney for it in his 2012 campaign. In an update added to the review, former Romney advisers suggested this had been unfair on Romney, but Bush retorted that this was a misunderstanding of his views on letting undocumented immigrants return to their home countries and apply for citizenship there; he added that it was not present in the book. Writing for the Miami Herald, Marc Caputo suggested this might have been a marketing ploy for Bush to attract more readers. In the National Review, Reihan Salam suggested Bush's idea bore "close resemblance to" the ideas of Peter Skerry, a professor of political science at Boston College and senior fellow at the Brookings Institution, and expressed his approval of the notion, adding that its implementation may prove difficult. However, Peter Skerry, in his review for The Weekly Standard, did not acknowledge this. Instead, he argued that they misunderstood a study by the Brookings Institution they use as a citation on the burden that immigrants impose on welfare programs. He added that it would be preferable to train low-skilled workers already on U.S. soil rather than bring in new ones, both for skilled and unskilled work.

Writing for The Washington Post, Manuel Roig-Franzia suggested Bush had flipflopped on immigration. Indeed, he writes that Bush supported the DREAM Act in 2002 while he takes a more conservative stance in the book. However, Roig-Franzia, who is bylined as the author of The Rise of Marco Rubio, notes that Bush and Marco Rubio, a Republican senator from Florida, are both potential contenders for the 2016 presidential election. In a review for The New Republic, Nate Cohn argued that the book presented an immigration policy unlikely to appeal to Hispanic voters. In The Wall Street Journal, Vincent J. Cannato, a professor of history at the University of Massachusetts Boston, wrote that it was "about as sensible a look at immigration policy as one will find these days". However, he added that the co-authors failed to give precise answers about specific "caps or yearly quotas". Moreover, he argued that their disavowal of family reunification in favor of skilled migrants would appear unattractive to Hispanic voters. In the Pittsburgh Post-Gazette, John F. Rohe of the anti-immigration Colcom Foundation agreed with Cannato that Bush and Bolick failed to give specific quotas for legal immigration. He went on to argue their pro-immigration stance would lead to "resource depletion," including "more water shortages, sprawl, farmland intrusion, wetland losses, biodiversity casualties, gridlock, toxins, energy demands, health care challenges and social safety net gaps," among other things. In a scathing review for The Guardian, Michael Wolff wrote that it was "a book without real thought, or information, or meaning, besides self-promotion, which exists only to provide a pretext to get the politician-author on television".

In another review published in The Washington Times, David DesRosiers, the former executive vice president of the Manhattan Institute and current publisher of RealClearPolitics, wrote that it was, "a must-read for every citizen, wannabe citizen, legal working resident and those illegally working in the shadows of our economy". Another glowing review came from Anneke Green of the White House Writers Group in June 2013, who argued in U.S. News & World Report that the United States Senate should be looking at Immigration Wars for solutions to immigration reform.

In July 2014, the co-authors published an opinion piece in The Wall Street Journal about the children's immigration crisis, where many children from Honduras, Guatemala and El Salvador have come into the United States territory illegally, highly solutions found in Immigration Wars.
