= Desert Ridge (disambiguation) =

Desert Ridge may refer to:

- Desert Ridge planned community in Phoenix, Arizona
- Desert Ridge Marketplace, shopping mall in Phoenix, Arizona
- Desert Ridge High School in Mesa, Arizona
- Desert Ridge Junior High School, also in Mesa, Arizona
- Desert Ridge Middle School in Albuquerque, New Mexico
