= Dana Berliner =

American lawyer

- Education: Yale University (BA, JD)

Dana Berliner is litigation director at the Institute for Justice, a public interest law firm in Arlington, Virginia. She was co-lead counsel for Susette Kelo in the landmark United States Supreme Court case Kelo v. City of New London.

== Education ==
Berliner received her law and undergraduate degrees from Yale University, where she was a member of the Yale Law Journal and represented clients through the legal services program.

== Career ==
Berliner has distinguished herself through her work in the area of eminent domain. Along with co-counsel Scott Bullock, Berliner litigated the landmark case Kelo v. City of New London. Berliner acted as lead counsel for Bill Brody in the New York eminent domain case Brody v. Village of Port Chester. In 2015, Berliner represented the Community Youth and Athletic Center, a non-profit boxing gym for children in National City, California, defending it from potential eminent domain use by the city.

In addition to her work in the courtroom, Berliner has authored two reports concerning eminent domain and been involved with the issue in other ways. In 2003, she wrote Public Power, Private Gain: A Five-Year, State-by-State Report Examining the Abuse of Eminent Domain. She also authored Opening the Floodgates: Eminent Domain Abuse in the Post-Kelo World, a report on the use and threatened use of eminent domain for private development in the year since the Kelo decision. Other works include "Looking Back Ten Years After Kelo" in The Yale Law Journal Forum, The Federal Rational Basis Test—Fact and Fiction in the Georgetown Journal of Law & Public Policy, and several articles about eminent domain in The Practical Real Estate Lawyer. Berliner has written amicus curiae briefs on constitutional eminent domain issues in more than ten states. She has taught many continuing legal education classes on eminent domain and worked with owners around the country in opposing the condemnation of their homes and businesses for private use.

Berliner has been quoted in The New York Times, USA Today, The Wall Street Journal, NPR, and The Washington Post as well as on various radio and television broadcasts, including 60 Minutes.

Berliner appeared in and was portrayed by Sophia Bush in the movie Freedom Hair, which was released in 2024. In 2017, she was portrayed by Miranda Frigon in the movie Little Pink House, starring Catharine Keener and Jeanne Tripplehorn.
