= Mountain States Legal Foundation =

American conservative law firm

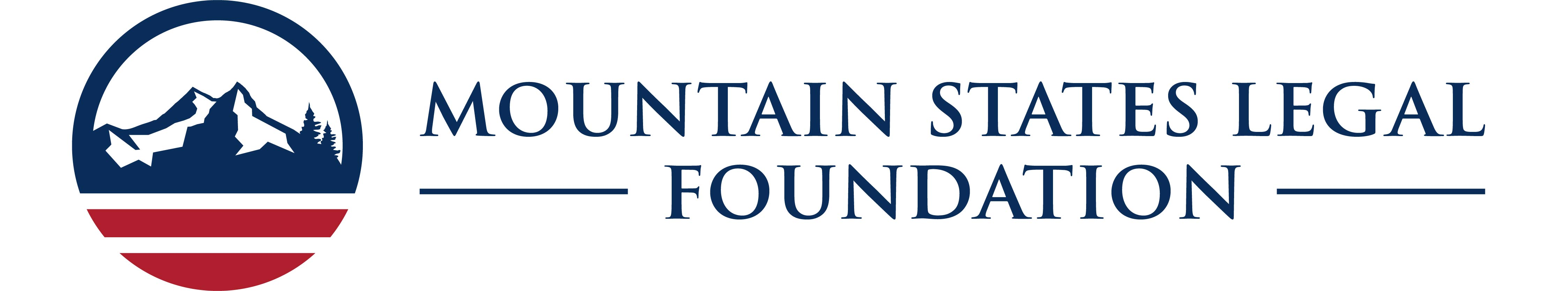
- Formation: 1977
- Type: 501(c)(3) nonprofit public interest law firm
- Purpose: Public interest litigation
- Headquarters: Lakewood, Colorado
- Region served: United States
- President and CEO: Cristen Wohlgemuth
- Revenue: $852,425 (2025)
- Staff: 13 (2026)
- Website: www.mslegal.org

Mountain States Legal Foundation (MSLF) is an American 501(c)(3) nonprofit conservative free market public interest law firm based in Lakewood, Colorado. Its lawyers argue cases on property rights and federal land management in the American West, as well as gun rights and other constitutional law cases.

Past attorneys for MSLF include James G. Watt and Gale Norton, who became U.S. secretaries of the interior in the Reagan administration and George W. Bush administration, respectively; William Perry Pendley, acting director of the Bureau of Land Management in the first Trump administration; and John Kyl, former U.S. senator from Arizona.

== History and activities ==
MSLF was incorporated in Denver, Colorado, in 1976 with funding from the National Legal Center for the Public Interest and Joseph Coors. MSLF's first president was James G. Watt. MSLF filed amicus briefs opposing an affirmative action program at the University of Colorado Law School, opposing business inspections, and opposing Idaho's ratification of the Equal Rights Amendment.

MSLF is governed by a volunteer Board of Directors, which also approves all legal actions taken by MSLF, and assisted in the selection of its litigation by a volunteer Board of Litigation. MSLF employs a full-time staff, which includes attorneys who conduct all of the litigation in which MSLF engages. The organization reports its annual budget to be over $2 million.

MSLF's office is in Lakewood, Colorado, near Denver. MSLF publishes a quarterly newsletter, The Litigator, which addresses topical legal issues.

Since its creation, MSLF has argued cases before the Supreme Court of the United States and numerous federal courts of appeals. In 1995, its president, William Perry Pendley, argued before the Supreme Court in Adarand Constructors, Inc. v. Peña, the case in which the justices ruled that preferential treatment based on race is almost always unconstitutional. MSLF has continued its litigation regarding affirmative action, reverse discrimination, and racial quotas and preferences, and also has litigated regarding the Voting Rights Act.

In addition, MSLF has litigated regarding property rights. Its lawsuits have involved the Endangered Species Act, the Clean Water Act, (especially regarding wetlands), the National Environmental Policy Act (NEPA), the National Forest Management Act, the Antiquities Act, the Multiple-Use Sustained-Yield Act of 1960, and the General Mining Act of 1872, and bars on and restrictions regarding the ability to develop natural resources such as energy and minerals and forest and agricultural products. In a case dismissed in 2002, MSLF sued George W. Bush for failing to overturn a designation of national monuments action by Bill Clinton.

MSLF's sources of funding have included Texaco, U.S. Steel, Phillips Petroleum, and ExxonMobil corporations, and Castle Rock Foundation.

== Notable employees ==
Notable past employees include:

- Clint Bolick – Justice on the Supreme Court of Arizona.
- Jon Kyl – former United States Senator from Arizona
- Chip Mellor – Former President and General Counsel of the Institute for Justice
- Gale Norton – 48th United States Secretary of the Interior
- James G. Watt – 43rd United States Secretary of the Interior
- William Perry Pendley — former acting director of the Bureau of Land Management
- Steven J. Lechner — Deputy Chief Administrative Judge, Interior Board of Land Appeals
