= Chip Mellor =

American lawyer and political activist (1950–2024)

William H. "Chip" Mellor (December 31, 1950 – October 11, 2024) was an American lawyer who co-founded the Institute for Justice (IJ). Mellor served as IJ's founding president and general counsel and later as chairman of the organization's board of directors. During his career at IJ, Mellor pursued constitutional litigation in four areas: economic liberty, property rights, school choice, and free speech.

== Early career ==
Mellor received his B.A. from Ohio State University in 1973 and his J.D. from the University of Denver Law School in 1977. From 1979 to 1983, he practiced public interest law with the Mountain States Legal Foundation in Denver. Following his time there, he served in the Ronald Reagan administration as Deputy General Counsel for Legislation and Regulations in the United States Department of Energy.

From 1986 until 1991, Mellor served as president of the Pacific Research Institute, a think tank located in San Francisco, California. Under Mellor's leadership, the organization commissioned and published books on civil rights, property rights, technology, and the First Amendment that would later serve as the Institute for Justice's long-term strategic litigation blueprint.

== Institute for Justice ==
In 1991, Clint Bolick and Chip Mellor founded the Institute for Justice, a nonprofit libertarian public interest law firm. Under Mellor's leadership as president and board chairman, the Institute for Justice litigated 12 U.S. Supreme Court cases, winning 10 of them. In addition, the organization helped pursue the landmark District of Columbia v. Heller case, in which the Supreme Court held that the Second Amendment to the U.S. Constitution protects an individual's right to possess a firearm for private use.

Mellor personally litigated lawsuits that broke open Denver's 50-year-old taxi monopoly, ended the funeral industry's monopoly on casket sales in Tennessee, and defended New Jersey's welfare reform. He also established the Institute for Justice Clinic on Entrepreneurship at the University of Chicago and worked with University of Chicago professor Richard Epstein on amicus briefs for eight property rights cases before the U.S. Supreme Court.

In 2008, Mellor co-authored with Robert A. Levy of the Cato Institute The Dirty Dozen: How Twelve Supreme Court Cases Radically Expanded Government and Eroded Freedom. The book takes on twelve Supreme Court cases that effectively amended the Constitution and argues for a Supreme Court that will enforce what the Constitution says about civil liberties, property rights and other controversial issues.

In a January 2012 profile of Mellor titled Litigating for Liberty, The Wall Street Journal wrote, "Move over, ACLU. Chip Mellor, president of one of America's most influential law groups is expanding freedom on political speech, organ transplants and other economic frontiers."

On June 7, 2012, Mellor was awarded the Bradley Foundation's Bradley Prize.

In 2016, Mellor was elevated to the Institute for Justice's chairman of the board. Scott Bullock succeeded him as President of the organization.

== Death ==
Mellor died from leukemia at his home in Moab, Utah on October 11, 2024, at the age of 73.
