= CityNorth =

Mixed-use development in Phoenix, Arizona

Coordinates: 33°41′00″N 112°00′00″W

CityNorth is a planned urban mixed-use development in the Northeast Valley of Phoenix, Arizona, US; featuring retail, restaurant, residential, hotel, office, cultural, civic and entertainment uses in a pedestrian-friendly environment. At completion, CityNorth will comprise more than 5,500,000 square feet (0.51 km^{2}; 0.20 sq mi) of development on 144 acres (0.58 km^{2}; 0.23 sq mi). Envisioned by Thomas J. Klutznick as the urban core of the Northeast Valley of Phoenix and the commercial core for the master-planned community of Desert Ridge, CityNorth is sited near the intersection of two major freeways—Loop 101 and State Route 51, making it accessible from throughout the Phoenix metropolitan area. The development will open in phases starting with Phase One, High Street, which opened in November 2008.

CityNorth is being developed with the assistance of a $97.4 million tax incentive package that was at the heart of a lawsuit between Phoenix and the Goldwater Institute. Future phases for CityNorth have been put on hold due to economic conditions.

The development was originally supposed to have Bloomingdale's, Macy's and Nordstrom as anchor department stores, but they have been pulled out of the project as a result of the Great Recession in 2009.

Construction on the project began on June 25, 2019, with water and sewer infrastructure as a starting point. An official groundbreaking is planned for early October 2019. In 2020, "early site improvements have included grading what eventually will be a four-lane road".

== Developers ==
CityNorth is being developed by Thomas J. Klutznick Company. The initial phases, called CityCenter of CityNorth, are being co-developed by Thomas J. Klutznick Company and Related Companies. Some previous developments by these companies are Chicago’s Water Tower Place, 730 North Michigan Avenue, 340 on the Park and 333 West Wacker Drive; Los Angeles's Fox Plaza office tower; Boston's Copley Place; New York's Time Warner Center; Reston Town Center, Reston, Virginia; CityPlace, West Palm Beach, California; The Inn & Links at Spanish Bay, Pebble Beach, California; and The Little Nell hotel, Aspen, Colorado.

== CityNorth master plan summary ==
+/- 5,500,000 square feet (0.51 km^{2}; 0.20 sq mi) to +/- 6,000,000 square feet (0.56 km^{2}; 0.22 sq mi) development
Use	Type	Size
Mixed-use (3,000,000 square feet (0.28 km^{2}; 0.11 sq mi))	Office Above Retail	450,000 square feet (0.04 km^{2}; 0.02 sq mi)
Mixed-use (3,000,000 square feet (0.28 km^{2}; 0.11 sq mi))	Retail & Restaurant	1,200,000 square feet (0.11 km^{2}; 0.04 sq mi)
Mixed-use (3,000,000 square feet (0.28 km^{2}; 0.11 sq mi))	Residential Above Retail	1,300,000 square feet (0.12 km^{2}; 0.05 sq mi)
Single-use (2,500,000 square feet (0.23 km^{2}; 0.09 sq mi))	Office	2,500,000 square feet (0.23 km^{2}; 0.09 sq mi)
Single-use (2,500,000 square feet (0.23 km^{2}; 0.09 sq mi))	Residential	1,500 – 2,000 units
Single-use (2,500,000 square feet (0.23 km^{2}; 0.09 sq mi))	Hotel	200-500 rooms

=== Phase 1 – High Street ===
High Street opened in November 2008. It comprises restaurant, retail, residential and office over approximately 20 acres (81,000 m^{2}).

On July 1, 2010, High Street, through foreclosure, reverted to the lenders who provided the construction financing.

=== Phase 2 - The Boulevard ===
Originally scheduled to open in November 2009, Phase 2 has been delayed, partly because of the downturn in Arizona's economy and partly because of the Goldwater Institute's lawsuit, Turken v. Gordon, against the $97.4 million economic development agreement with the City of Phoenix for the project.

== Disagreement over economic benefit ==
=== City and developer claims ===
The following projections are based on estimates provided by the City of Phoenix and Thomas J. Klutznick Company.

Municipal Tax Revenues

- $1 billion to the City of Phoenix over the life of CityNorth
- $22 million average annually during years 1 to 10

Construction Sales Tax

- City - $21,200,000
- State - $57,300,000

Jobs Created

- 16,000 during construction
- 19,000 during operation

==== Other ====
- $6.5 million in development fees and commercial, restaurant, construction, retail and residential-rental taxes.
- 75 subcontractors and approximately 600 construction worker jobs for phase one.
- Numerous intangibles for the City of Phoenix.

=== Goldwater Institute position ===
The Goldwater Institute disputes these claims, considering them to be exaggerations. One of the studies finds two errors for the CityNorth economic impact:

- The City of Phoenix assumes that no mall will be built without the subsidy, while also assuming that every sales tax dollar generated from CityNorth would have otherwise gone to another city without the malls existence.
- The City assumes that goods and services at CityNorth have no cost because it does not subtract retail costs from profit. For example, the City is assuming that a retail store in CityNorth also creates the clothing it sells.

According to Dr. Dave Wells, "Gross economic impacts overstate actual impacts as they presume no economic activity would have occurred otherwise—e.g., that if you did not buy shoes at CityNorth you would not buy shoes at all. And it presumes that nothing would be built if CityNorth was not developed as proposed. In addition the estimates by Elliot Pollack and Company overstate the gross retail impact by 50 percent in terms of jobs and 75 percent in terms of economic output."

According to the Goldwater Institute, the economic impact is less than $500 million a year, almost a quarter of the estimated impact by the city.

== Lawsuit, Turken v. Gordon ==
To develop CityNorth, the Thomas J. Klutznick Company entered into a sales tax incentive agreement with the City of Phoenix where the Klutznick company will keep 50% of all sales tax dollars collected at CityNorth, up to $97.4 million for 11.3 years. This sales tax incentive put CityNorth at the center of a lawsuit brought on by the Goldwater Institute, which is seeking to challenge corporate subsidies in Arizona. In exchange for $97.4 million Klutznick will allow Phoenix to lease 3,180 parking spaces, 200 of which will be reserved for city bus carpoolers. The lease will last 45 years.

On April 2, 2008, Maricopa County Superior Court Judge Robert Miles ruled in favor of the City of Phoenix and Thomas J. Klutznick Company. Judge Miles denied the Goldwater Institute's claim that the City's agreement with CityNorth violated the Arizona Constitution. He ruled that the economic activity generated by CityNorth is “undoubtedly” in the public interest. The Goldwater Institute has since replied by appealing the ruling.

The developer of CityNorth and the City of Phoenix filed claims in Maricopa County Superior Court on April 22, 2008, requesting that the court order the Goldwater Institute to pay legal fees incurred while fighting the lawsuit. The CityNorth filing argues that the Institute “compounded the length and complexity of the litigation with irrelevant ‘experts’ who hadn't even read the agreement, and displayed a reckless disregard for the enormous fiscal and business interests with which it was interfering.” According to the City of Phoenix’s filing, “Not only did the Goldwater Institute proceed with this action knowing that it might be ordered to pay the city’s fees and costs, it litigated this case in a manner that increased its scope and expense far beyond that which was required to fully litigate the dispositive issues therin.”

The Goldwater Institute argues the attorney's fees request violates conditions agreed upon by all parties during the trial. Clint Bolick, chief litigator for the Goldwater Institute, states "Courts almost never have awarded attorney fees against firms seeking to vindicate public rights. The reasons were articulated by Arizona Supreme Court Justice Stanley Feldman in the very same case, Wistuber v. Paradise Valley Unified School District, that all the parties agree sets the legal parameters for the Gift Clause under which the CityNorth case is litigated."

Mr. Bolick asserted that constitutional cases, such as Turken v. Gordon, are rarely won at the lower court level, and expected a victory at the appeals court to be more likely.

=== City of Phoenix/CityNorth position ===
The agreement between the City of Phoenix and CityNorth's developer allows CityNorth to be built as a dense urban project designed to counter sprawl and reduce traffic. Without an incentive for parking garages, it is likely that more than half of the development would have been consumed by surface parking lots, thus limiting the number of sales-tax-generating businesses. As stated in Judge Miles’ ruling, “The agreement was designed to ensure that the project that is built provides the contemplated benefits – particularly the substantial tax revenues – on a schedule and at a level that is more advantageous to the public than some other, differently configured project that might be built at the site.”

No City funds were advanced and no City tax revenues are at risk. The developer must bear all of the estimated $1.5 billion cost to develop CityNorth and assume all of the financial risk. CityNorth is projected to generate hundreds of millions of tax-revenue dollars for the City and thousands of jobs. CityNorth will pay for itself with the revenues it generates. Judge Miles states, “The monetary value to be received by the agreement is based on the sale-tax revenues to be generated by the CityNorth project from the 1.2 million feet of retail space that the developer must build before it can receive any payment from the city....Under the agreement the city is projected to receive hundreds of millions of dollars in future sales taxes to use for any public purpose it chooses.”

=== Goldwater Institute position ===
The Goldwater Institute claims the incentive is a corporate subsidy, which is illegal according to Arizona's constitution.

According to the Goldwater Institute, Phoenix will pay more than $30,000 per year to lease 200 carpool parking spaces for the next 45 years. The city, which claims the incentive is not a subsidy but a market based incentive, could have bought and owned 6,950 parking spaces in a parking garage for the same price it paid to lease 200. The Goldwater Institute also obtained records on the attorney's fees for the city, claiming that Phoenix spends more than $10,000 per week to defend the subsidy.

The Goldwater Institute also believes that the city has overestimated the benefits of the project. The City estimates a $1.9 billion impact while a Goldwater Institute study argues the true impact will be less than $500 million. The Goldwater Institute also argues that no net benefit will result from the subsidy because the mall would have been built anyway due to the high demand for shopping in a rapidly growing and affluent section of Phoenix. Dr. Wells also questions the public benefit of the CityNorth project, finding that the area in which CityNorth is being constructed has an average income per capita that is $21,000 higher than the rest of Phoenix and the demographic population around CityNorth is 3 times more likely to be white than the rest of Phoenix.

According to the Goldwater Institute, the subsidy violates three provisions of the Arizona state constitution, the Gift Clause, Privilege and Immunities Clause, and the Special Laws Clause. The Goldwater Institute believes the incentive is nothing more than a corporate subsidy aimed at rewarding the politically well connected.

=== Arizona Supreme Court decision ===
On January 25, 2010, the Arizona Supreme Court struck down the Appeals Court ruling and allowed the CityNorth agreement to stand. The Court upheld that the City of Phoenix and Klutznick Company acted in good faith based on more than 25 years of case law. The Court's ruling made it clear that deals between the government and private developers like CityNorth must have a direct benefit to the government. Any indirect benefits, such as jobs and sales-tax increases cannot apply to the deal, as a result. Thus, deals in the future must do two things: specify what the government will get in return, and assure that the benefits the government receives in return satisfies the government's investment in the deal.
