= William Perry Pendley =

American conservative activist and official (born 1945)

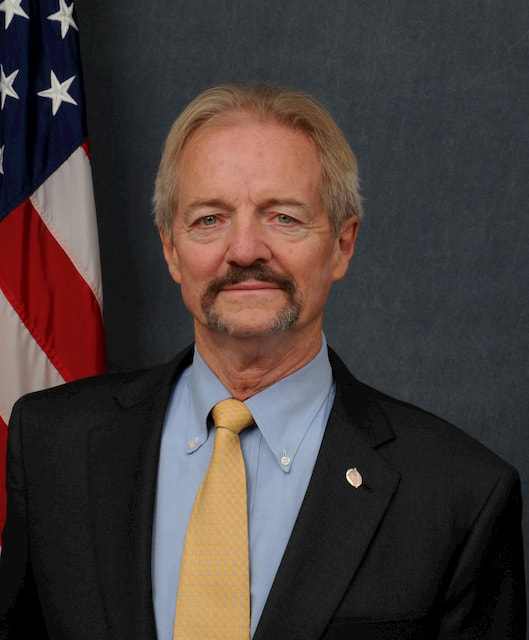

Deputy Director of the Bureau of Land Management for Policy and Programs
- In office July 15, 2019 – January 20, 2021
- President: Donald Trump

Director of the Bureau of Land Management
- De facto, unlawful
- In office July 29, 2019 – September 25, 2020
- President: Donald Trump
- Preceded by: Brian Steed (acting)
- Succeeded by: Tracy Stone-Manning

Personal details
- Born: April 3, 1945 (age 81) Cheyenne, Wyoming, U.S.
- Education: George Washington University (BA, MA); University of Wyoming (JD)

Military service
- Allegiance: United States
- Branch/service: United States Marine Corps
- Rank: Captain

William Perry Pendley is an American attorney, conservative activist, political commentator, and government official who served as the acting director of the Bureau of Land Management from 2019 to 2021.

Pendley was appointed by Interior Secretary David Bernhardt as a Deputy Director of the Bureau of Land Management in July 2019. He was elevated to acting director less than a month afterward. Pendley was one of a number of high-ranking acting officials carrying out official duties in the Trump administration who was never confirmed by the Senate. No BLM director was ever confirmed by the Senate during Trump's presidency.

U.S. District Judge Brian Morris ruled on September 25, 2020, that Pendley had served unlawfully for 424 days and blocked him from continuing, although Pendley refused to acknowledge the ruling; still, Pendley moved to another role that was not the directorship.

== Early life and education ==
Pendley is a native of Cheyenne, Wyoming. Pendley received Bachelor of Arts and Master of Arts degrees in economics and political science from George Washington University in Washington, D.C. He received a Juris Doctor from the University of Wyoming College of Law. He was a captain in the United States Marine Corps.

== Career ==
During the Reagan administration, Pendley was a deputy interior secretary for energy and minerals under James G. Watt. Pendley was reassigned in 1984 when a federal commission faulted him, along with other high-ranking officials, in the underpricing of coal-mining leases in the Powder River Basin, the largest such federal sale in history.

Prior to joining the Department of the Interior, Pendley worked as a Legislative Assistant to former Wyoming Senator Clifford Hansen, and as Minority Counsel to the United States House Committee on Mines and Mining of the United States House Committee on Insular Affairs.

Pendley is formerly a longtime president of the Mountain States Legal Foundation, a conservative Colorado-based group that advocates for selling off federal land in the West. He has written several books opposing government regulation of Western lands.

Pendley has sued against the Endangered Species Act of 1973, has called the science of climate change "junk science", and has written that climate change believers are "kooks". He falsely claimed in 1992 that there was no credible evidence of a hole in the ozone layer. In a July 2017 speech to conservative activists, he joked about the killing of endangered species.

Pendley has also made controversial public comments on some issues unrelated to conservation. In a 2007 fundraising letter, he wrote that illegal immigration was spreading like "a cancer". In 2017, he wrote that the Black Lives Matter movement was based on a "terrible lie" because Michael Brown had not said "Hands up, don't shoot" before he was killed by a police officer.

=== Trump administration ===
Pendley was appointed to deputy director and then acting director of the Bureau of Land Management in 2019. His role as acting director of BLM was controversial, given that Pendley had previously advocated for selling off federal lands. He said he would not pursue mass land sales that he had previously campaigned for, because "the president has made it very clear that we do not believe in the wholesale transfer of federal lands". He released a list of nearly five dozen former clients, including oil, mining and agriculture interests, that he would recuse himself from decisions on for a year or two.

Opponents of Pendley's appointment included the Sierra Club; the Wilderness Society; Backcountry Hunters & Anglers; the CEO of the Patagonia clothing company; Public Employees for Environmental Responsibility; Sen. Martin Heinrich, Democrat of New Mexico; and Joe Biden, the 2020 Democratic presidential candidate. His supporters included Sen. Steve Daines, Republican of Montana.

In the Trump administration, Pendley oversaw the relocation of Bureau of Land Management jobs out of Washington, D.C., to Western states. Pendley said that he would prefer to relocate personally to Grand Junction, Colorado, but his own job was one of 61 identified as needing to be kept in Washington. Congress rejected funding for the relocations, and Rep. Raúl Grijalva of Arizona, the Democratic chair of the House Natural Resources Committee, said that Congress would investigate whether the plan was appropriate. In December 2019, Pendley wrote that nearly two-thirds of the 153 employees told to move out of Washington had agreed to relocate. U.S. Secretary of the Interior David Bernhardt officially established the bureau's headquarters as Grand Junction on August 11, 2020. As of January 2021, 328 positions had been relocated; of them, 41 employees moved to Grand Junction, and 287 employees left the bureau instead of moving.

Pendley said the biggest threat to U.S. public lands is feral horses and burros "causing havoc".

On December 30, 2019, 91 groups with connections to public lands sent a letter to Secretary of the Interior Bernhardt demanding that Pendley resign or be removed from office for alleged conflict of interest. The Interior Department called the groups who signed the letter "environmental extremists." The day afterward, Bernhardt acted to extend Pendley's tenure through April 2020. Bernhardt repeatedly issued orders extending Pendley's tenure in an acting capacity, bypassing a Senate confirmation process. In May 2020, two activist groups, Public Employees for Environmental Responsibility and the Western Watersheds Project, sued over Bernhardt's ongoing appointments of Pendley to run the BLM and David Vela to lead the National Park Service. In June 2020, an unwritten order by Bernhardt extended Pendley's acting appointment indefinitely. On June 26, 2020, Trump said he planned to nominate Pendley for confirmation by the Senate, a move that CNN said might give Pendley firmer legal footing to continue on an interim basis. On August 15, 2020, administration officials said the nomination would be withdrawn. Pendley continued leading BLM. On September 8, 2020, the nomination was formally withdrawn.

Pendley was ordered to leave his position by U.S. District Judge Brian Morris on September 25, 2020, after Governor Steve Bullock of Montana sued in federal court. The Interior Department said it would appeal the ruling, and Pendley refused to resign, suggesting that Judge Morris's ruling had "No impact, no impact whatsoever." Pendley said in an October 2020 press conference that he couldn't be ousted because he was never officially named acting director, and that he acted instead as deputy director for policy and programs.

=== Project 2025 participation ===
Pendley was the author of Chapter 16, Department of the Interior, of Mandate for Leadership (2025), the policy planning document of the conservative Heritage Foundation's Project 2025 "Presidential Transition Project" for a possible second Trump administration.

== Personal life ==
Pendley and his wife live in Evergreen, Colorado, and he also rents an apartment in Washington, D.C.

== See also ==
- Environmental policy of the first Donald Trump administration
