= Save Our Secret Ballot =

The Save Our Secret Ballot, Inc. (SOS) is a 501(c)(4) conservative advocacy organization created to promote states to pass constitutional amendments that would ban card check legislation. Former U.S. Congressman Ernest Istook (R-OK) is Chairman of the National Advisory Board.

== Card check legislation ==
=== History ===
Since the National Labor Relations Act was passed, it has been legal for workers to form a union when a majority of employees in a bargaining unit sign cards indicating their intent to bargain collectively with the employer. According to a recent law review article, the National Labor Relations Board in its early days "certified on the record when there had been an agreement with the employer for card-check." It adds that "in the final year before the Taft-Hartley Act was passed [in 1947], 646 representation petitions were informally resolved through the card-check procedure."

In 1969, Chief Justice Earl Warren delivered the majority opinion for the U.S. Supreme Court that upheld the use of majority sign-up (card check). Warren stated, "Almost from the inception of the Act, then, it was recognized that a union did not have to be certified as the winner of a Board election to invoke a bargaining obligation; it could establish majority status by other means ... by showing convincing support, for instance, by a union-called strike or strike vote, or, as here, by possession of cards signed by a majority of the employees authorizing the union to represent them for collective bargaining purposes." NLRB v. Gissel Packing Co., (1969). The Supreme Court has consistently ruled in favor of majority sign-up (card check), and Warren cited prior affirmations in NLRB v. Bradford Dyeing Assn., (1940); Franks Bros. Co. v. NLRB, (1944); United Mine Workers v. Arkansas Flooring Co., (1956).

=== Employee Free Choice Act ===
The bill is currently being considered in the United States Congress. The latest version was introduced into both chambers of the U.S. Congress on March 10, 2009. The Bill's purpose is to,

amend the National Labor Relations Act to establish an efficient system to enable employees to form, join, or assist labor organizations [unions], to provide for mandatory injunctions for unfair labor practices during organizing efforts, and for other purposes.

The Bill would, firstly, allow a union to be certified as the official union to bargain with an employer if union officials collect signatures of a majority of workers. The Bill would remove the present right of the employer to demand an additional, separate ballot where over half of employees have already given their signature supporting the union. Secondly, the Bill would require employers and unions to enter binding arbitration to produce a collective agreement at latest 120 days after a union is recognized. Thirdly, the Bill would increase penalties on employers who discriminate against workers for union involvement.

== Constitutional amendments ==
In 2010, four states passed referendums to their state constitutions guaranteeing the right to a secret ballot.

=== Arizona ===
Arizona Proposition 113 was passed in 2010. The constitutional amendment to the Arizona State Constitution would ensure that workers get a secret ballot to vote for union representation.

Proposition 113
Choice	Votes	%
For	899,924	60.58
Against	585,554	39.42
Total	1,485,478	100.00

=== South Carolina ===
South Carolina Amendment 2 (2010) was passed and amended the South Carolina State Constitution.

Amendment 2
Choice	Votes	%
For	1,060,473	86.13
Against	170,807	13.87
Total	1,231,280	100.00

=== South Dakota ===
South Dakota Amendment K was passed and amended the South Dakota State Constitution.

Amendment K
Choice	Votes	%
For	241,851	79.13
Against	63,776	20.87
Total	305,627	100.00

=== Utah ===
Utah Amendment A was passed and amended the Utah State Constitution.

Amendment A
Choice	Votes	%
For	335,728	60.07
Against	223,151	39.93
Total	558,879	100.00

== National advisory board members ==
Membership as of November 2, 2010:

- Ernest Istook, former U.S. Congressman (R-OK)
- Pat Toomey, former U.S. Congressman (R-PA)
- Merrill Cook, former U.S. Congressman (R-UT)
- Adam Hasner, Florida House Minority Leader (R-FL)
- Gilbert Baker, State Senator (R-AK)
- John Loudon, State Senator (R-MO)
- Mark Meierhenry, former State Attorney General (R-SD)
- Mark Shurtleff, State Attorney General (R-UT)
- Troy King, State Attorney General (R-AL)
- Clint Bolick, member of Goldwater Institute
- Sydney Hay, President of the Arizona Mining Association
- Paul Jacob, founder of U.S. Term Limits
- Brian Johnson, Director of Alliance for Worker Freedom
- Jonathan Johnson, President of Overstock.com
