= The Dirty Dozen (book) =

2008 book by Robert A. Levy and William Mellor

- Author: Robert A. Levy and William Mellor
- Publisher: Cato Institute
- Publication date: 2008
- ISBN: 978-1595230508
- Website: cato.org/dirty-dozen book

The Dirty Dozen: How Twelve Supreme Court Cases Radically Expanded Government and Eroded Freedom is a Cato Institute book, written by Robert A. Levy and William Mellor and released in May 2008, about twelve U.S. Supreme Court decisions that were viewed as greatly undermining individual freedom by expanding the power of government. The book was the subject of many reviews and much press. It was released around the time that Levy gained media attention as the organizer and financier behind District of Columbia v. Heller.

== List of cases ==
The decisions criticized in the book are:

- Wickard v. Filburn 317 U.S. 111 (1942), which expanded federal power over intrastate production pursuant to the Commerce Clause;
- Helvering v. Davis 301 U.S. 619 (1937), which held that Social Security was constitutionally permissible as an exercise of the federal power to spend for the general welfare and did not contravene the Tenth Amendment;
- Home Building & Loan Association v. Blaisdell 290 U.S. 398 (1934), which held that Minnesota's suspension of creditors' remedies was not in violation of the United States Constitution;
- Whitman v. American Trucking Association, Inc. 531 U.S. 457 (2001), which held that Congress could delegate legislative power to the Environmental Protection Agency;
- McConnell v. Federal Election Commission 540 U.S. 93 (2003), which upheld the constitutionality of most of the Bipartisan Campaign Reform Act of 2002 (BCRA), often referred to as the McCain–Feingold Act;
- United States v. Miller 307 U.S. 174 (1939), which allowed federal regulation of sawed-off shotguns;
- Korematsu v. United States 323 U.S. 214 (1944), which upheld Japanese American internment;
- Bennis v. Michigan 516 U.S. 442 (1996), which held that innocent owner defense is not constitutionally mandated by the Fourteenth Amendment's Due Process in cases of civil forfeiture.
- Kelo v. City of New London 545 U.S. 469 (2005), which upheld the use of eminent domain to transfer land from one private owner to another to further economic development;
- Penn Central Transport Co. v. New York 438 U.S. 104 (1978), which upheld the denial of compensation for regulatory takings;
- United States v. Caroline Products 304 U.S. 144 (1938), which upheld federal regulation of goods traded in interstate commerce;
- Grutter v. Bollinger 539 U.S. 306 (2003), which upheld the affirmative action admissions policy of the University of Michigan Law School.
