= North/Northwest Phoenix =

Region of the city

Coordinates: 33.68°N 112.06°W

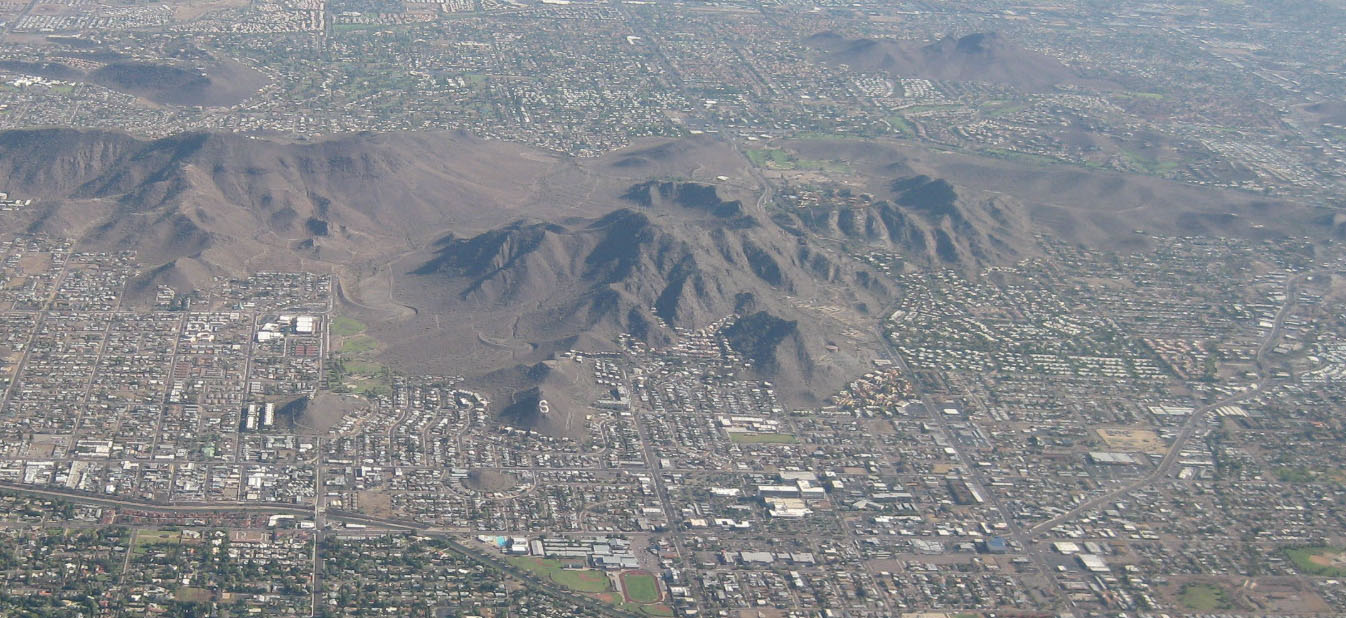
view of North Phoenix and Phoenix Mountains.

North/Northwest Phoenix is a region in the city of Phoenix, Arizona. While the area with this name has no official separate status, it usually refers to the Urban Villages of Paradise Valley (not to be confused with the independent town of Paradise Valley), North Mountain, Deer Valley, Desert View, and North Gateway.

== History ==
Camelback Mountain and the Phoenix Mountains contained Native American sacred sites which had been visited for centuries. The Stoneman Military Trail from Fort McDowell to Fort Whipple (Prescott) came through the area in the 1870s.

Mining activity took place in the small town of Union beginning in the 1880s in the area currently referred to as Deer Valley (also near the Union Hills which bear its name). It eventually declined and left only a few ruins, making it a ghost town. The last remnants were bulldozed in the 1990s to make way for new construction.

In the 1890s, parts of this area had been slated for agricultural irrigation with water from the Verde River to its east under the auspices of the Rio Verde Canal Company, although the plan failed. Bell Road and Shea Boulevard in Phoenix are named for two farmers, James A. Shea and Harvey Bell, who later on formed the Paradise Verde Irrigation District in the early 20th century in an unsuccessful attempt to obtain water to irrigate the area.

The old state route that is now Cave Creek Road went between Phoenix and the town of Cave Creek. The small, unincorporated town of Cactus existed near what is now the intersection of Cactus Road and Cave Creek Road until the 1960s, when it was annexed by Phoenix. Other named places nearby included Valley Heights and Montgomery. These locations are now within Phoenix's city limits.

The US Air Force established the North Phoenix Airport as a facility for military use at some time around 1945-48 but dismantled it after the 1960s. In 1963, North Phoenix Chamber of Commerce was established.

With the failure of agricultural development, which was concentrated mostly to the west and southeast of the Phoenix metropolitan area, North Phoenix contained only a small number of ranch homes, horse ranches, and a few small businesses for many decades. The rest of the area was open desert. After the mid-20th century this began to change rapidly as many new suburban housing developments, shopping centers, and office buildings continue to be built.

== Transportation ==
Many residents commute by automobile to work in central Phoenix or other Valley cities. Major east-west arterial streets include Bell Road, Union Hills Drive, Greenway Road, and Thunderbird Road. Major north-south streets that serve the area most include 7th, 19th and 35th Avenues, and 7th, 24th, and 40th Streets as well as Tatum Boulevard (essentially an arterial extension of 48th Street). Interstate 17, State Route 101 (Loop 101), and State Route 51 serve this community.

Phoenix Deer Valley Airport handles general and corporate aviation and is the busiest airport of its type in the country.

Valley Metro bus routes operate here. Several new routes have been implemented in North Phoenix because of rising demand. RAPID buses, so called due to their use of freeways to link suburbs with central Phoenix, have stops near Bell Road and I-17 and Route 51.

More transit centers are planned in the future as roads and freeways near capacity and few other options exist to accommodate transportation needs. Valley Metro Rail, part of the Valley Metro system, is slated to be extended to North Phoenix in the very long term, although the plans have been postponed because of scarce funding and high costs.

== Shopping ==
Deer Valley contains a regional mall near the intersection of Route 101 and I-17, which is anchored by a Target store and an AMC movie theater complex. American Express, Discover Card, and Best Western Hotels operate major customer service call centers in this area.

The former Paradise Valley Mall was a major shopping center located roughly at Tatum Boulevard and Cactus Road. The mall grounds also contain a Valley Metro transit stop for buses, and is slated as a location for light rail service in the future. It is not in the town of Paradise Valley, which is an exclusive, highly upscale independent municipality surrounded by Phoenix and Scottsdale, but the mall is about two miles to the north.

Other facilities in this part of Phoenix that use Paradise Valley's name include Paradise Valley Community College near 32nd Street and Union Hills Drive. The Paradise Valley Golf Course is directly to the east. Paradise Valley Hospital and Paradise Valley High School are located at 40th Street and Bell Road. Paradise Valley Park and Paradise Valley Community Center are also nearby.

Kierland Commons is a major upscale master-planned shopping, residential and resort community developed in the late 1990s and is located on the eastern edge of Phoenix, on the border with Scottsdale.

Desert Ridge Marketplace is on north Tatum Boulevard near Loop 101.

== Recreation ==
Reach 11 Recreation Area is just to the south of Loop 101 and offers hiking and horseback riding among preserved desert trails.

The Phoenix Mountains are here, and others such as Deem Hills, Ludden Mountain, and the Hedgepeth Hills area near Thunderbird Park are nearby.

Private golf courses are numerous. There are also several operated by the Maricopa County Parks and Recreation Department, such as Paradise Valley Golf Course. The city and county administer public swimming pools for use during summer.

== Education ==
The Paradise Valley Unified School District, incorporating elementary, middle, and high schools, operates over most of this area. It is one of the largest school districts in the state.

The main public postsecondary institution is Paradise Valley Community College. It also hosts a branch office of Northern Arizona University (NAU) where students to take classes at this campus for transferable credit. Another satellite NAU location in North Phoenix is at Greenway Road and Interstate 17.

Arizona Christian University is a private four-year Christian institution located on Cactus Road.

Cultural facilities include many branches of the Phoenix and Maricopa County public library systems. The Pioneer Arizona Living History Museum is an Old West interpretive history center. Deer Valley Rock Art Center, run by Arizona State University, was created to protect and display ancient Native American engravings from the Hedgpeth Hills petroglyph site.
