= Desert Ridge =

Planned community in Phoenix, Arizona

Coordinates: 32.680926°N 114.501246°W

The Desert Ridge master-planned community comprises 5,700 acres (23.07 km^{2}; 8.91 sq mi) and is situated in the Northeast Valley of Phoenix, Arizona. As one of Arizona’s master-planned communities, Desert Ridge could contains over 50,000 residents. The community includes CityNorth, Toscana of Desert Ridge, Desert Ridge Marketplace, JW Marriott Desert Ridge Resort & Spa, Mayo Clinic Hospital and American Express regional campus.

== Timeline ==
- 1991 – Specific Plan adopted
- 1993 – First 1,420 acres (5.7 km^{2}) purchased/leased
- 1993 – Master Developer assigned
- 1996 – First homes sold
- 1997 – SUMCO (Sumitomo Metal Industries) opens
- 1998 – Mayo Clinic Hospital opens
- 2001 – Desert Ridge Marketplace opens
- 2002 – American Express regional campus opens
- 2002 – Loop 101 opens to the east
- 2002 – JW Marriott Desert Ridge Resort & Spa opens
- 2002 – Wildfire Golf Club opens
- 2006 – Desert Ridge Medical Campus opens
- 2008 – CityCenter of CityNorth, Phase I – Opened November 2008
- 2008 – Residence Inn by Marriott, part of Mayo Clinic – Opened fall 2008
- 2010 – Musical Instrument Museum – Opened early 2010
- 2010 – Sagewood – Opened early 2010
- 2010 – CityCenter of CityNorth, Phase II – Opened fall 2010
- 2010 - CityNorth Developer sued Gray development. Gray awarded 110 million.

== History of Desert Ridge ==
Created through a public-private partnership between the State of Arizona, City of Phoenix and the Master Developer, the Desert Ridge master plan, adopted by the City of Phoenix as the Desert Ridge Specific Plan, has guided development in the community since 1991.

Already in place, in addition to several residential neighborhoods with nearly 4,000 homes, are Mayo Clinic’s 210-acre (0.85 km^{2}) Phoenix campus that includes Mayo Clinic Hospital and Mayo Clinic Specialty Building; Desert Ridge Marketplace, a 1,200,000-square-foot (110,000 m^{2}) retail, dining and entertainment center; Toscana of Desert Ridge Condo community, and JW Marriott Desert Ridge Resort & Spa.

== Schools ==
Desert Ridge is part of the Paradise Valley Unified School District. The community is home to 4 schools ranging from kindergarten to 12th grade, which include Desert Trails Elementary School, Explorer Middle School, Paradise Valley High School and Pinnacle High School.
