= Castle Coalition =

- Formation: 2002
- Headquarters: Arlington, Virginia
- Website: http://www.CastleCoalition.org/

The Castle Coalition is a network of U.S. homeowners and citizen activists determined to stop the abuse of eminent domain in their communities, that is, the taking of private property by the government in order to give it to another private individual. The organization takes its name from the principle that Americans' homes or businesses should be their castles, that is, places where they are safe and free from abusive government power. The principle has been part of Anglo-American legal tradition since Edward Coke famously stated, "... a man's house is his castle".

The Castle Coalition was founded in March 2002 as a project of the Institute for Justice (IJ) in response to the number of the requests attorneys received from citizens facing threats of eminent domain who were years away from any actual litigation. After the success of community groups in Pittsburgh, Pennsylvania, and New Rochelle, New York, attorneys at IJ organized a conference for other activists facing eminent domain abuse from around the United States to teach them how to succeed in preventing their local government from taking their property through eminent domain. Castle Coalition-trained activists have been successful in saving their homes in places like Ardmore, Pennsylvania, Chicago, Lakewood, Ohio, and Los Angeles, California.

On 13 May 2002, Fortune magazine praised the new organization in a piece titled "Fighting City Hall":

Superheroes? Maybe. Although its name sounds like something out of a comic book, the Institute for Justice, a public-interest law firm in Washington, D.C., actually provides a much needed resource for business owners threatened with eviction. Since its founding in 1991, the firm has waged public relations campaigns and even stepped in to take legal action in communities when it feels the power of eminent domain has been abused. Of the nine projects that the Institute has taken on, it has won seven and lost none, and two are pending. But because the law firm can't take on every case across the U.S., it also created a grassroots group called the Castle Coalition to help teach business owners the ways they can take their fight to the streets and win. The group consists of community leaders and property owners who've successfully fought eminent domain cases or are currently involved in one. The coalition's website (castlecoalition.org) contains information on what steps you need to take and also tells you when to call in the pros.

In 2005, the Supreme Court issued its decision in Kelo v. City of New London. Although the decision allowed for a more expansive view of the public use clause in the Fifth Amendment of the Constitution the decision also states, "Nothing in our opinion precludes any State from placing further restrictions on its exercise of the takings power." In response to the decision, the Castle Coalition expanded its focus to include the reform of state and local eminent domain laws.

In June 2005, they launched a $3 million Hands Off My Home campaign, calling it "an aggressive initiative to effect significant and substantial reforms of state and local eminent domain laws." Two years after the beginning of the Hands Off My Home campaign, they published the 50 State Report Card to provide the results of the campaign. By June 2007, 21 states had enacted substantive eminent domain reform and another 21 states had increased eminent domain protections but not nearly enough to prevent takings allowed by the Kelo decision. Eight states had not passed any legislation reforming their eminent domain laws.

The Castle Coalition provides model legislative language for eminent domain reform, stricter blight statutes and state constitutional amendments. The Castle Coalition also has several publications documenting the extent and nature of eminent domain abuse across the United States.

The Castle Coalition also brings activists together for a national conference annually and teaches home and small business owners how to protect themselves against eminent domain.

== Publications ==
- "50 State Report Card: Tracking Eminent Domain Reform Legislation since Kelo" Published June 2007
- Curt Pringle, "Development without Eminent Domain: Foundations of Freedom Inspire Urban Growth" Published June 2007
- Mindy Thompson Fullilove, MD, Eminent Domain & African Americans: What is the Price of the Commons? Published February 2007
- Dreher and Echeverria: Disinformation & Errors on Eminent Domain A Response to Kelo’s Unanswered Questions Published January 2007
- Dana Berliner, Opening the Floodgates: Eminent Domain Abuse in a Post-Kelo World Published June 2006
- Redevelopment Wrecks: 20 Failed Projects Involving Eminent Domain Abuse Published June 2006
- Myths and Realities of Eminent Domain Abuse Published June 2006
- Eminent Domain Abuse Survival Guide
- Legislative Action Since Kelo An overview of the states' legislative responses to Kelo
- Kelo v. City of New London: What it Means and the Need for Real Eminent Domain Reform Published 2005
- Dana Berliner, Public Power Private Gain: A Five-Year State By State Report Examining the Abuses of Eminent Domain Published April 2003
- Government Theft: The Top 10 Abuses of Eminent Domain Published 2002
