= James G. Watt =

American politician (1938–2023)

James Watt
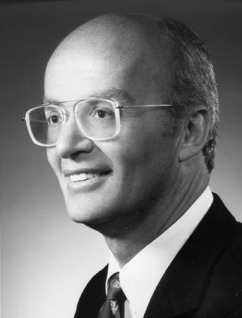
- 1981 portrait

43rd United States Secretary of the Interior
- In office January 23, 1981 – November 8, 1983
- President: Ronald Reagan
- Preceded by: Cecil Andrus
- Succeeded by: William Clark

Personal details
- Born: James Gaius Watt; January 31, 1938 Lusk, Wyoming, U.S.
- Died: May 27, 2023 (aged 85) Arizona, U.S.
- Party: Republican
- Spouse: Leilani Bomgardner (m. 1957)
- Children: 2
- Education: University of Wyoming (BS, JD)

James Gaius Watt (January 31, 1938 – May 27, 2023) was an American lawyer, lobbyist, and civil servant who served as Secretary of the Interior in the Ronald Reagan administration from 1981 to 1983. He was described as "anti-environmentalist" and was one of Ronald Reagan's most controversial cabinet appointments.

His tenure as Secretary of the Interior was controversial primarily because he was perceived as hostile to environmentalism. Watt opened up nearly all of America's coastal waters to oil and gas drilling, widened access to coal on federal lands, and eased restrictions on strip-mining. His proposals to sell off federal lands failed due to extensive opposition. In 1983, he resigned after controversially remarking that a panel reviewing his coal-leasing policies had "every kind of mixture—I have a black. I have a woman, two Jews and a cripple."

After resigning from government, Watt became a lobbyist for builders seeking contracts with the U.S. Department of Housing and Urban Development (HUD). In 1995, he was indicted on 18 counts of felony perjury and obstruction of justice for making false statements before a federal grand jury investigating influence peddling at HUD. The following year, he was sentenced to five years' probation.

== Early life and career ==
Watt was born in Lusk, Wyoming, the son of Lois Mae (née Williams) and William Gaius Watt, a lawyer and homesteader.

Watt attended the University of Wyoming, earning a bachelor's degree in 1960 and a juris doctor degree in 1962.

== Career ==
Watt's first political job was as an aide to Republican Party Senator Milward L. Simpson of Wyoming, whom he met through Simpson's son, Alan.

A lifelong Republican, he served as Secretary to the right-leaning Natural Resources Committee and Environmental Pollution Advisory Panel of the U.S. Chamber of Commerce. In 1969, Watt was appointed the deputy assistant secretary of water and power development at the Department of the Interior. In 1975, Watt was appointed vice chairman of the Federal Power Commission.

In 1977, Watt became the first president and chief legal officer of Mountain States Legal Foundation, a public interest law firm "dedicated to individual liberty, the right to own and use property, limited and ethical government and economic freedom". A number of attorneys who worked for Watt at the firm later became high-ranking officers of the federal government, including Ann Veneman and Gale Norton.

=== U.S. Secretary of the Interior ===
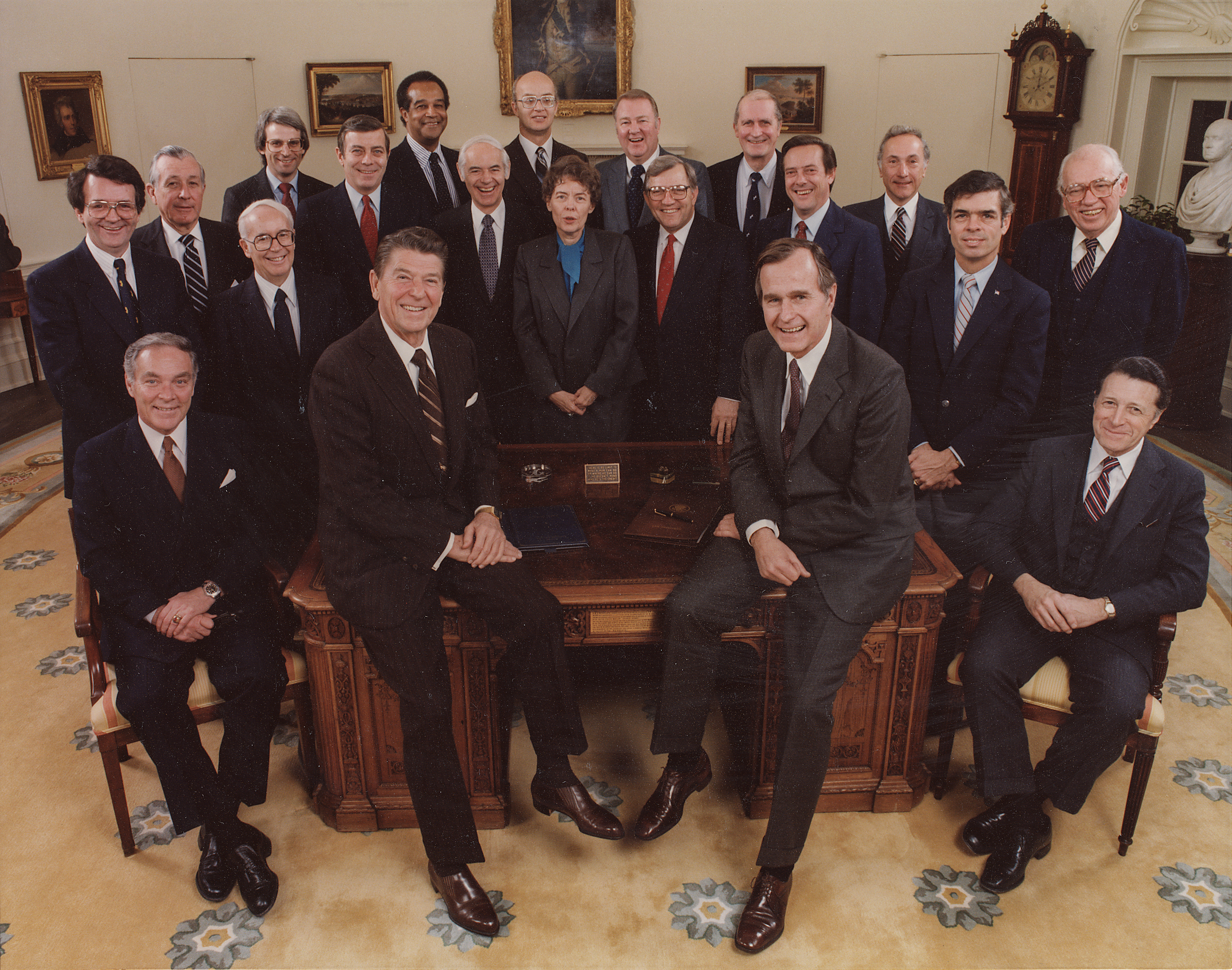
President Ronald Reagan and his Cabinet in 1981, including Watt (back row, sixth from the left)

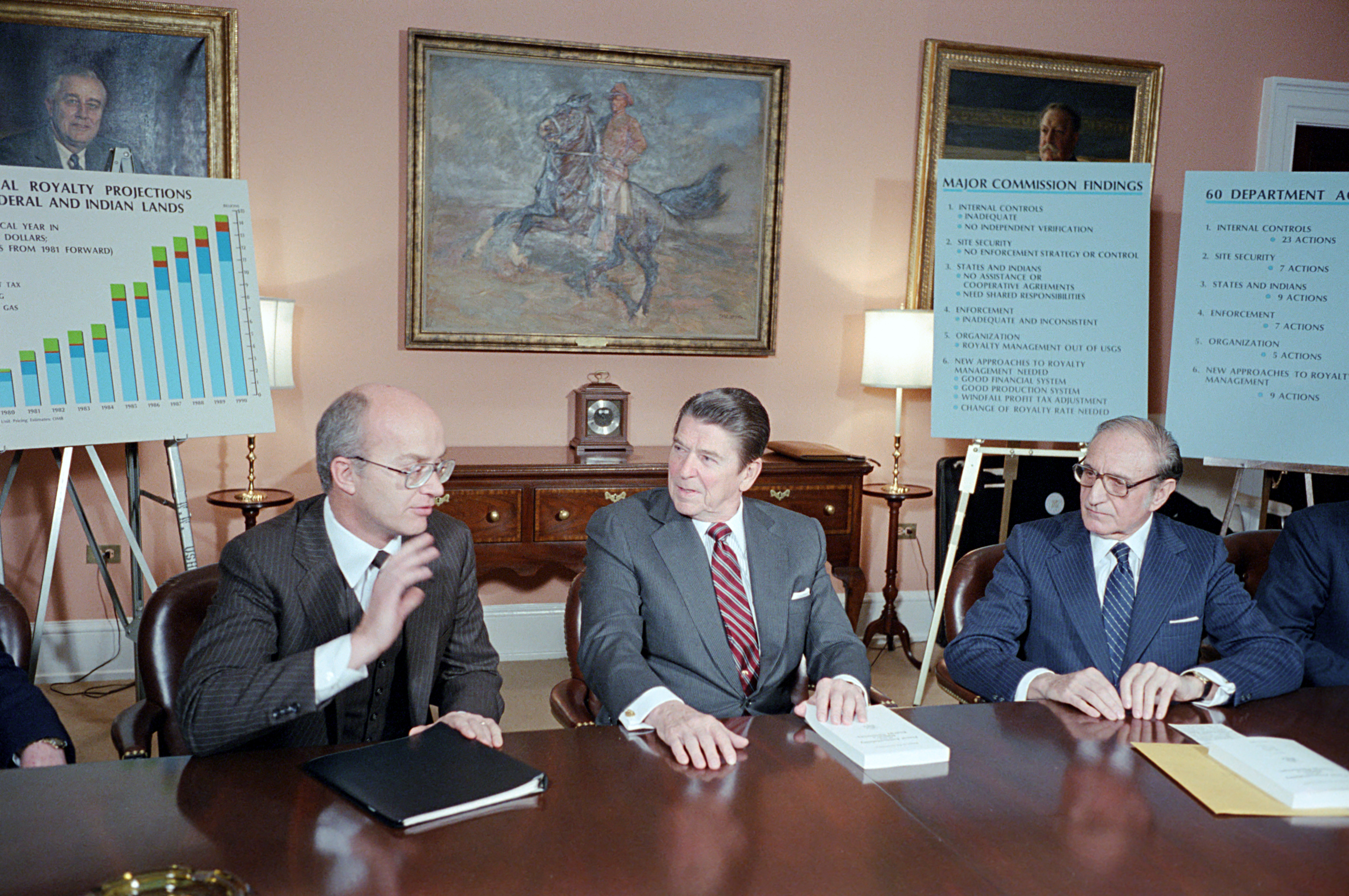
President Reagan (center) during a meeting with members of the President's Commission on Fiscal Accountability, including Watt (left) and David Linowes (right), in the Roosevelt Room in 1982

In 1980, President-elect Reagan nominated Watt as his Secretary of the Interior. The United States Senate subsequently confirmed the nomination. Greg Wetstone, the chief environment counsel at the House Energy and Commerce Committee during the Reagan administration, who subsequently served as director of advocacy at the Natural Resources Defense Council, argued that Watt was one of the two most "intensely controversial and blatantly anti-environmental political appointees" in American history. The other was Anne Gorsuch, director of the EPA at the time. Environmental groups accused Watt of reducing funding for environmental programs, restructuring the department to decrease federal regulatory power, wanting to eliminate the Land and Water Conservation Fund which aimed at increasing the area of wildlife refuges and other protected land, easing regulations of oil and mining, and recommending lease of wilderness and shore lands such as Santa Monica Bay to explore and develop oil and gas. Watt resisted accepting donation of private land to be used for conservation.

Watt proposed that 80 million acres (320,000 km^{2}) of undeveloped land in the United States all be opened for drilling and mining by 2000. The area leased to coal mining quintupled during his term as Secretary of the Interior. Watt boasted that he leased "a billion acres" (4 million km^{2}) of coastal waters, even though only a small portion of that area would ever be drilled. Watt once stated, "We will mine more, drill more, cut more timber." According to the Center for Biological Diversity, Watt had the record, among those who served as Secretary of the Interior, of listing the fewest species protected under the Endangered Species Act. The record was later surpassed by Dirk Kempthorne, a George W. Bush appointee, who had not listed a single species in the 15-month period since his confirmation.

Watt periodically mentioned his Dispensationalist Christian faith when discussing his method of environmental management. Speaking before Congress, he once said, "I do not know how many future generations we can count on before the Lord returns, whatever it is we have to manage with a skill to leave the resources needed for future generations." One apocryphal quotation attributed to Watt is: "After the last tree is felled, Christ will come back." Glenn Scherer, writing for Grist magazine, erroneously attributed this remark to 1981 testimony by Watt before Congress. Journalist Bill Moyers, relying on the Grist article, also attributed the comment to Watt. After it was discovered that the alleged quotation did not exist, Grist corrected the error, and Moyers apologized. "I never said it. Never believed it. Never even thought it," Watt later wrote of the statement. "I know no Christian who believes or preaches such error. The Bible commands conservation—that we as Christians be careful stewards of the land and resources entrusted to us by the Creator."

==== Beach Boys concert ====
From 1980 through 1982, The Beach Boys and The Grass Roots separately performed at Independence Day concerts at the National Mall in Washington, D.C., attracting large crowds. In April 1983, Watt banned the concerts, asserting that "rock bands" who had performed on the Mall on Independence Day in 1981 and 1982 had encouraged drug use and alcoholism and had attracted "the wrong element", who would subsequently rob attendees of similar events. Watt then announced that Las Vegas singer Wayne Newton, a friend and an endorser of President Reagan and a contributor to the Republican Party, would perform at the Independence Day celebration at the mall in 1983. During the ensuing controversy, Rob Grill, lead singer of The Grass Roots, stated that he felt "highly insulted" by Watt's remarks, which he termed "nothing but un-American."

The Beach Boys stated that the Soviet Union, which had invited them to perform in Leningrad in 1978, "obviously ... did not feel the group attracted the wrong element." Vice President George H. W. Bush said of The Beach Boys, "They're my friends, and I like their music." Watt apologized to The Beach Boys after learning that President Reagan and First Lady Nancy Reagan were fans of the band. Nancy Reagan apologized for Watt. The White House staff gave Watt a plaster foot with a hole for his "having shot himself in the foot".

==== Other controversies ====
In early 1982, Congress voted to cite Watt in contempt due to refusing to hand over documents.

Mad magazine listed ten Watt controversies on the back cover of their October 1982 issue, under the title "Watt... We Worry!"

In an interview with the Satellite Program Network, Watt said, "If you want an example of the failure of socialism, don't go to Russia, come to America and go to the Indian reservations."

==== Resignation ====
A controversy erupted after a speech to the U.S. Chamber of Commerce in September 1983, when Watt mocked affirmative action with his description of a department coal leasing panel: "I have a black, a woman, two Jews and a cripple. And we have talent."

Within three weeks of making this statement, on October 9, 1983, he announced his resignation at deputy undersecretary Thomas J. Barrack's ranch, near President Reagan's Rancho del Cielo.

== Later life ==
After leaving the Department of the Interior in 1983, Watt lobbied the Department of Housing and Urban Development. Ten years later in 1995, Watt was indicted on 18 counts of felony perjury and obstruction of justice and accused of making false statements before a federal grand jury investigating influence peddling at the Department of Housing and Urban Development at that time. On January 2, 1996, Watt pleaded guilty to one misdemeanor count of withholding documents. On March 12, 1996, he was sentenced to five years' probation and ordered to pay a fine of $5,000 and perform 500 hours of community service.

In a 2001 interview with The Denver Post, Watt applauded the energy policy of the George W. Bush administration, stating that it was just what he recommended in the early 1980s: "You've got to have more oil, you've got to have more coal, you've got to have more of everything," Watt said. "You've got to have more conservation too, but ... solar energy and wind energy—they're just teeny infant portions [of energy]. You're not going to run the world with solar energy by the year 2001, or 2002, or 2010."

In his later years, Watt lived in Wickenburg, Arizona.

== Death ==
Watt died on May 27, 2023, in Arizona, at the age of 85.

== Personal life ==
Watt was a talented athlete, class valedictorian and prom king at his high school; he married his prom queen, Leilani Bomgardner, in 1957, when he was 19. They had two children. Watt was a member of the Assemblies of God USA.

Political offices
| Preceded by Cecil D. Andrus | United States Secretary of the Interior; 1981–1983 | Succeeded by William Clark |
