= Clint Bolick =

American judge (born 1957)

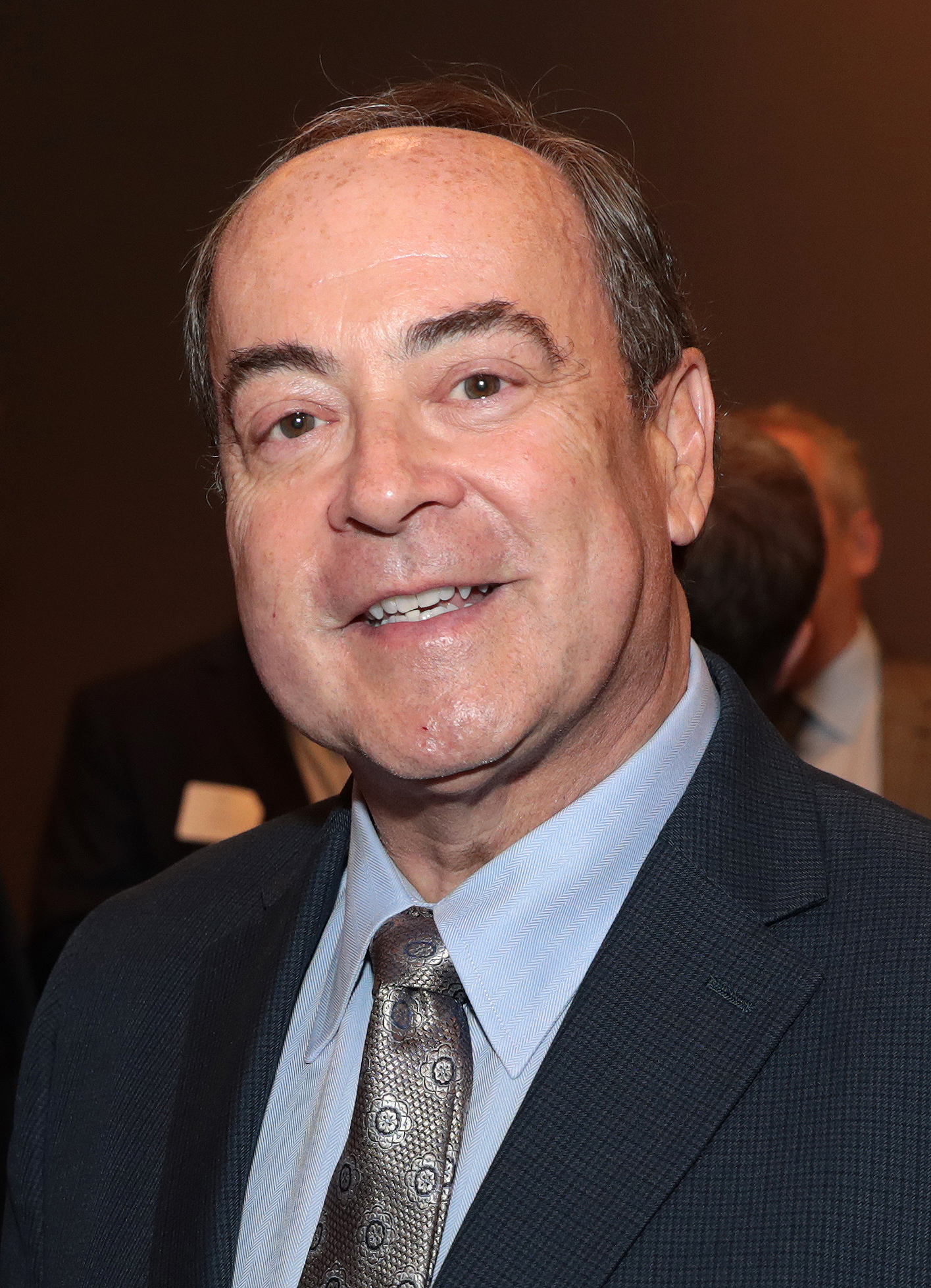

Justice of the Arizona Supreme Court
- Incumbent
- Assumed office January 6, 2016
- Appointed by: Doug Ducey
- Preceded by: Rebecca White Berch

Personal details
- Born: December 26, 1957 (age 68) Elizabeth, New Jersey, U.S.
- Spouse: Shawnna Bolick
- Education: Drew University (BA); University of California, Davis (JD)

Clint Bolick (born December 26, 1957) is a justice of the Arizona Supreme Court. Previously, he served as Vice President of Litigation at the conservative/libertarian Goldwater Institute. He co-founded the libertarian Institute for Justice, where he was the Vice President and Director of Litigation from 1991 until 2004. He led two cases that went before the Supreme Court of the United States. He has also defended state-based school choice programs in the Supreme Courts of Wisconsin and Ohio.

== Early life and education ==
Bolick was born on December 26, 1957 in Elizabeth, New Jersey. Bolick grew up in nearby Hillside, New Jersey and graduated from Hillside High School in 1975. He graduated from Drew University in 1979 and received his Juris Doctor from the University of California Davis School of Law in 1982. As a law student, he supported laws and legal rulings that knocked down racial discrimination (calling Brown v. Board of Education a "triumph of the principle of equality"), and was a vocal opponent of Affirmative Action-based admission policies.

In 1980, he ran as a Libertarian for a seat in the California State Assembly. He lost to an incumbent Democrat but garnered 7.1% of the vote. (In that election, the Libertarian presidential ticket earned about 1% of the vote nationwide.)

== Career ==
=== Mountain States Legal Foundation ===
In 1982, he joined a public interest law firm, the Mountain States Legal Foundation in Denver, Colorado. He was hired by the foundation's acting president, William H. "Chip" Mellor. In 1984, Mellor left the organization over a conflict with one of the foundation's sponsors. Bolick also left, believing that the foundation was more interested in protecting business interests than in promoting economic freedom. In 2005, he said:

Chip and I discovered that there is a world of difference between an organization that is pro-business and an organization that is pro-free enterprise.

After their break with Mountain States, they began planning a free-enterprise public interest law firm that would follow a philosophy of "economic liberty." These plans would lead to the founding of the Institute for Justice in 1991.

=== Equal Employment Opportunity Commission Justice Department ===
Bolick joined the Equal Employment Opportunity Commission (EEOC) in 1985. While he only stayed at the EEOC for a year, he became friends with its chairman, future Supreme Court Justice Clarence Thomas. (Thomas is the godfather to Bolick's second son.) Thomas helped convince him that removing economic barriers for the poor was more important than fighting race-based "reverse discrimination." In 1991, he would support adding punitive damages to Title VII of the Civil Rights Act of 1964. He explained "It seemed to me that if you didn't want quotas, you had to have tough remedies and punitive damages against recalcitrant discriminators ... That very much came out of Thomas." Thomas also shaped his preferred remedy for inequality: removing laws and regulations he viewed as preventing the poor from starting small businesses. Thomas did this in part by telling Bolick about his grandfather, who began with a hand-built pushcart and built a profitable delivery service that comfortably supported his family, only to encounter threats from regulations designed to destroy Black-owned businesses.

Bolick left the EEOC to join the Justice Department in 1986. In 1988, he wrote his first book, Changing Course. In this book, he defined civil rights in part from the perspective of removing economic and regulatory barriers for the poor and disadvantaged.

=== Landmark Center for Civil Rights ===
In 1989, he left the Justice Department and, with a grant from the Landmark Legal Foundation, started a public advocacy law practice in Washington, D.C. In its first case, the Landmark Center for Civil Rights represented Washington shoeshine stand owner Ego Brown in his attempt to overturn a Jim Crow-era law against bootblack stands on public streets. The law was designed to restrict economic opportunities for African-Americans, but was still being enforced 85 years after its passage. He sued the District of Columbia on Brown's behalf, and the law was overturned in 1989.

While working for the Landmark Legal Foundation, he defended the first Wisconsin school voucher program in court.

He supported Thomas during his confirmation hearings for the Supreme Court. On July 31, 1991, about 45 people from Thomas' hometown of Pin Point, Georgia visited Washington to show support for the nominee. At the time, Bolick told The Washington Post that the Landmark Center for Civil Rights raised $3,000 to pay for bus rental and contributed another $1,100 for hotel charges.

=== Institute for Justice ===
In 1991, Bolick and Chip Mellor (his former boss from the Mountain States Legal Foundation) co-founded the Institute for Justice with funding from billionaire Charles Koch. He was the Vice President and Director of Litigation from 1991 until 2004. The organization litigates on behalf of small businesses faced with regulations that it views as unjustified or anti-competitive. It also promotes school choice, property rights, and free speech. Bolick and the institute were active in defending a Cleveland, Ohio school voucher program, which was declared constitutional in a 2002 Supreme Court case, Zelman v. Simmons-Harris The court ruled in favor of a Cincinnati, Ohio school voucher program, allowing the use of public money to pay tuition at private and parochial schools. He led the case Swedenburg v. Kelly while at the institute. This case was consolidated with Granholm v. Heald and considered by the U.S. Supreme Court in 2005. Bolick argued the case before the court, along with attorney Kathleen Sullivan. The court struck down regulatory barriers to direct interstate shipment of wine to consumers.

In April 1993, he wrote an op-ed for The Wall Street Journal opposing two appointments by the Clinton administration (Lani Guinier to assistant attorney general for civil rights and Norma V. Cantu to assistant secretary for civil rights in the Department of Education). The Journal ran the piece under the headline "Clinton's Quota Queens." After the piece was published, he distributed information about Guinier's writings and interpreted them for reporters. He also appeared on Nightline and Crossfire to oppose her appointment. The article and Bolick's subsequent efforts were credited with helping end Guinier's appointment. On June 3, 1993, President Bill Clinton withdrew her nomination. Clinton stated that he had not read Guinier's writings at the time of her nomination, and called some of them "anti-democratic". Clinton went on to describe the effort to stop Guinier's appointment as "a campaign of right-wing distortion and vilification", and according to press reports referred to Bolick's editorial with "particular scorn". Other critics accused Bolick and conservatives who opposed Guinier of racism and sexism, often citing the phrase "quota queen" as evidence.

=== Alliance for School Choice ===
In 2004, Bolick joined the Alliance for School Choice, a national non-profit educational policy group advocating school choice programs across the United States. He was this organization's first president and general counsel.

=== Goldwater Institute ===
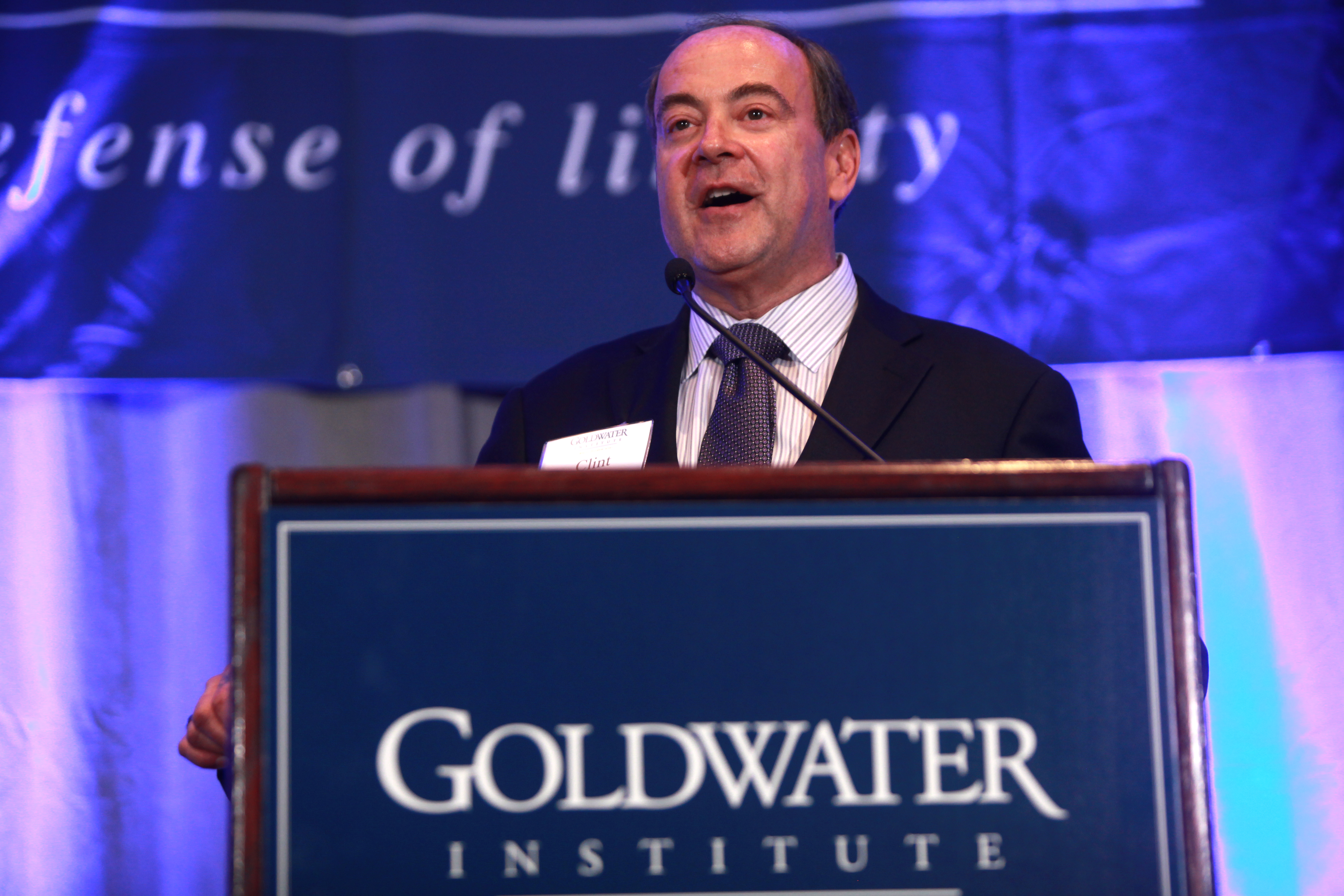
Bolick speaking at the 2014 Goldwater Dinner in Scottsdale, Arizona

In 2007, he became the Vice President for Litigation at the Goldwater Institute when that organization added a litigation group.

Bolick helped to draft model legislation known as the 'Health Care Freedom Act' that would prohibit health insurers from accepting federal subsidies under the Affordable Care Act that trigger the employer mandate. Arizona and Oklahoma voters approved a version of the Health Care Freedom Act in their respective November 2010 general elections.} Also in November 2010, voters in Arizona, South Carolina, South Dakota and Utah adopted a measure he drafted called Save Our Secret Ballot, which guarantees workers the right to a secret-ballot vote in union-organizing elections.

In 2012, he was an attorney for a Mesa tattoo parlor that had been denied a business license by the city. The case resulted in the Arizona Supreme Court declaring tattoos Constitutionally protected free speech. Bolick marked his victory by getting a small tattoo of a scorpion on his index finger.

On July 30, 2015, Republican presidential candidate Donald Trump called for the deportation of all of the estimated 11 million illegal immigrants in the United States. Bolick called Trump's idea "impractical and opposed by a large majority of Americans."

=== Appointment to Arizona Supreme Court ===
On January 6, 2016, Arizona Governor Doug Ducey appointed Bolick to the Arizona Supreme Court. He won retention for a 6-year term in 2018 and again in 2024.

== Works ==
=== Nonfiction books ===
- Changing Course: Civil Rights at the Crossroads (1988) ISBN 978-0887381799
- Unfinished Business: A Civil Rights Strategy for America's Third Century (1990) ISBN 978-0936488356
- Grassroots Tyranny: The Limits of Federalism (1993) ISBN 978-1882577019
- The Affirmative Action Fraud: Can We Restore the American Civil Rights Vision? (1996) ISBN 978-1882577279
- Transformation: The Promise and Politics of Empowerment (1998) ISBN 978-1558155060
- Voucher Wars: Waging the Legal Battle Over School Choice (2003) ISBN 978-1930865372
- Leviathan: The Growth of Local Government and the Erosion of Liberty (2004) ISBN 978-0817945527
- David's Hammer: The Case for an Activist Judiciary (2007) ISBN 978-1933995038
- Death Grip: Loosening the Law's Stranglehold over Economic Liberty (2011) ISBN 978-0817913144
- Two-Fer: Electing a President and a Supreme Court (2012) ISBN 978-0817914646
- Immigration Wars: Forging an American Solution (Jeb Bush) (2013) ISBN 978-1476713458

=== Fiction books ===
- Nicki's Girl (2007) ISBN 978-1587367038

=== Other ===
Bolick has authored and co-authored numerous other paperbacks, ebooks and audiobooks.

== Awards ==
In 2006, he won one of the four Bradley Prizes. The Bradley Prize included a one-time $250,000 stipend. He is currently a Research Fellow at Stanford University's Hoover Institution. American Lawyer magazine named him one of three Lawyers of the Year in 2003. In 2009, Legal Times included him in their list of the "90 greatest Washington lawyers of the past 30 years".

== Personal life ==
Bolick is married to Arizona State Representative Shawnna Bolick. They have two children.

== See also ==
- Libertarian theories of law

Legal offices
| Preceded by Rebecca White Berch | Justice of the Arizona Supreme Court; 2016–present | Incumbent |
