= Blazing Bagels =

Bagel company based in the U.S. state of Washington

Blazing Bagels and Bakery, Inc.
- Logo

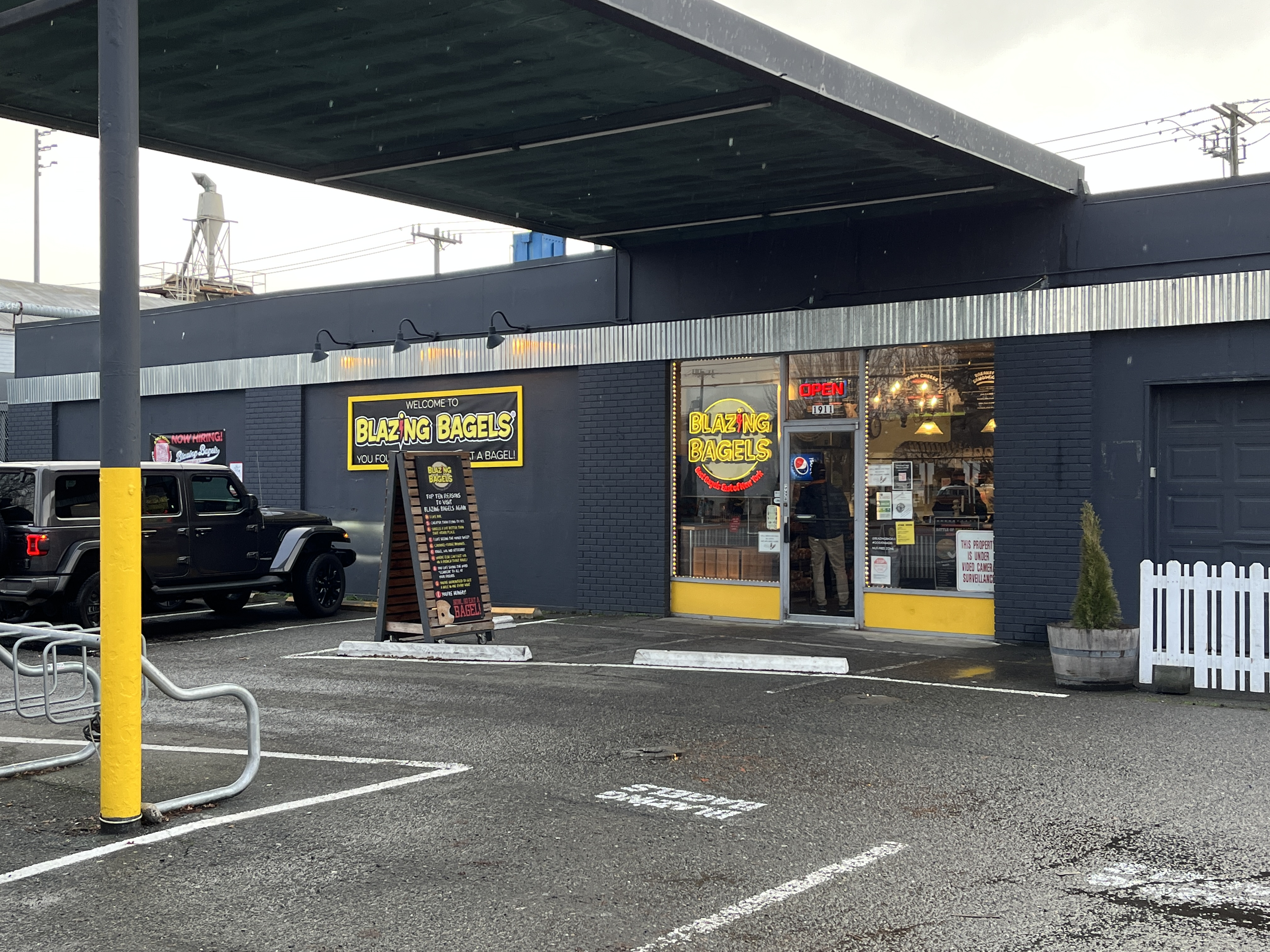
- Exterior of the shop in Seattle's SoDo neighborhood, 2023
- Company type: Private
- Industry: Restaurant
- Genre: Bakery
- Founded: 2001; 25 years ago in Redmond, Washington, United States
- Founder: Dennis Ballen
- Defunct: March 2026
- Fate: Bankruptcy
- Headquarters: Redmond, Washington, United States
- Number of locations: 4
- Area served: Seattle metropolitan area
- Products: Bagels
- Owner: Ballen family
- Number of employees: 110 (2017)

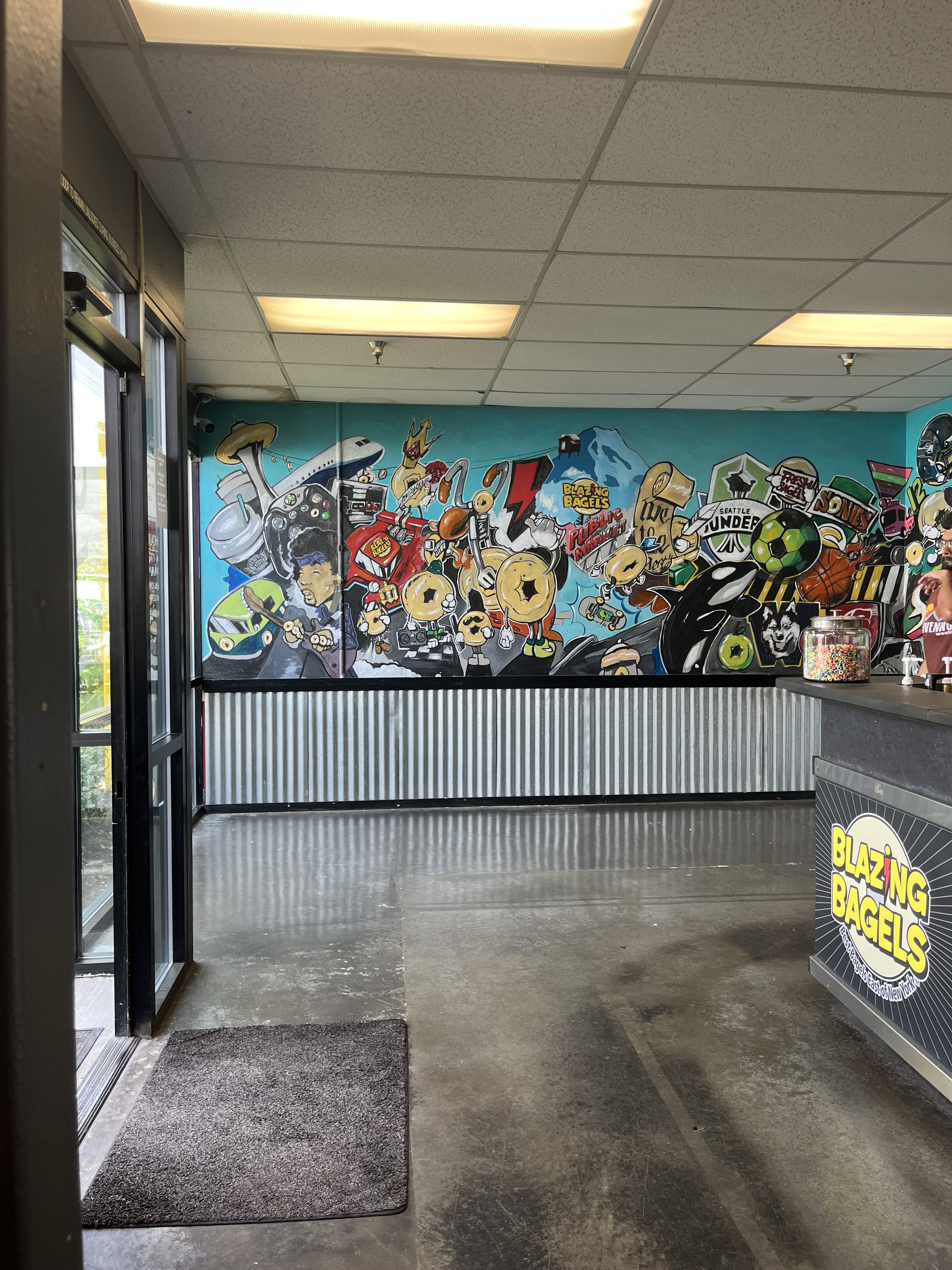
Mural inside the Redmond, Washington location

Blazing Bagels and Bakery, Inc., doing business as Blazing Bagels, was an American regional chain of bagel bakeries based in Redmond, Washington, with operations throughout the Seattle metropolitan area. The business was founded by Dennis Ballen in 2001 and owned by him and his family. All locations suddenly closed in March 2026 due to financial trouble.

== Description ==
Blazing Bagels was a Redmond, Washington-based bagel company with multiple locations in the Seattle metropolitan area. Menu categories included "Cheesy" and "Meat Topped"; bagel varieties included French toast, pesto, and rosemary.

== History ==
Dennis Ballen established the business in Redmond, Washington, opening a storefront in 2001. Blazing Bagels had four locations in the Seattle metropolitan area, as of 2020, operating in Redmond, Bellevue, and Seattle's Ravenna and SoDo neighborhoods. The business also supplied local restaurants such as Dingfelder's Delicatessen.

Ballen once sued the city of Remond after he was stopped "from putting an employee on a corner in a sandwich-board sign that advertised fresh bagels".

The company employed approximately 110 people and sold approximately 36,000 bagels per day as of 2017. In 2018, The Seattle Times said Blazing made 7 million bagels annually.

The business supported local charities, donating approximately 220,000 bagels annually, as of 2019. Blazing Bagels collaborated with athletes such as J. P. Crawford and Marco Gonzales to release signature sandwiches with proceeds benefitting various organizations. In 2019, the Remond location was the starting point for the Tulip Ride, a motorcycle ride to Skagit Valley benefitting Seattle Humane.

During the COVID-19 pandemic, the business operated via delivery and take-out.

Dennis Ballen retired from the company on March 27, 2025, with his daughters subsequently taking over operations. Later that December, Blazing Bagels closed its wholesale business and shrunk its in-store menu due to issues with its solvency; a new menu was introduced in February 2026. Meanwhile, rumors swirled within the company that some locations could close, but hiring and equipment upgrade efforts continued until March 12, when employees received an email stating that the company was bankrupt and would close as a result. Employees stayed off work the following day, with many returning two days after receiving the email to retrieve personal items as a company representative confirmed the permanent closure to local media; the workers were notified that they would only receive pay for completed working hours despite the sudden halt to operations. Blazing Bagels filed for Chapter 7 bankruptcy liquidation on March 24, 2026.

== Reception ==
Allecia Vermillion of Seattle Metropolitan wrote in 2020, "These bagels have a fan base, for sure, one that perplexes bagel purists." Christina Ausley included Blazing Bagels in the Seattle Post-Intelligencer's 2020 overview of the city's best bagel shops.
