= Institute for Justice =

American libertarian non-profit public interest law firm

- Formation: September 3, 1991; 35 years ago
- Founders: Clint Bolick; William Mellor
- Type: 501(c)(3) organization
- Tax ID no.: 52-1744337
- Headquarters: 901 N. Glebe Road, #900 Arlington, Virginia 22203
- Coordinates: 38.8814°N 77.1153°W
- President & General Counsel: Scott Bullock
- Revenue: $49.9 million (2024)
- Expenses: $44.3 million (2024)
- Staff: 178, including 65 attorneys (2025)
- Website: www.ij.org

The Institute for Justice (IJ) is a libertarian non-profit public interest law firm in the United States. As of 2026, IJ has litigated thirteen cases before the United States Supreme Court, winning eleven of them. The cases addressed issues of eminent domain, interstate commerce, public financing for elections, school vouchers, tax credits for private school tuition, civil asset forfeiture, and residency requirements for liquor licenses. The organization was founded in September 1991. As of 2023, it employed a staff of 157 full-time staff members (including 64 attorneys) in Arlington, Virginia and seven offices across the United States.

== History ==
William H. "Chip" Mellor and Clint Bolick co-founded the organization in 1991. Mellor was the organization's President & General Counsel through 2015. Bolick was the Vice President and Director of Litigation from 1990 until he left the organization in 2004. In March 2015, the organization announced that Mellor would become the chairman of its board of directors in January 2016. Senior Attorney Scott Bullock replaced Mellor as President.

The organization's methods were modeled in part on work Bolick had done as the director of the Landmark Center for Civil Rights in Washington, D.C. For example, in the late 1980s Bolick represented Washington shoeshine stand owner Ego Brown in his attempt to overturn a Jim Crow-era law against bootblack stands on public streets. The law was designed to restrict economic opportunities for African Americans but was still being enforced 85 years after its passage. Bolick sued the District of Columbia on Brown's behalf, and the law was overturned in 1989. In 1991, Bolick joined former Department of Energy Deputy General Counsel Chip Mellor to create the Institute for Justice. Mellor had served as president of the Pacific Research Institute for Public Policy, a think tank in San Francisco. According to the Institute for Justice, books commissioned and published by the Pacific Research Institute "formed the Institute for Justice's long-term, strategic litigation blueprint".

=== Supreme Court cases ===
The organization has litigated cases that reached the Supreme Court:

- Zelman v. Simmons-Harris, 536 U.S. 639 (2002): The court ruled in favor of a Cleveland, Ohio school voucher program, allowing the use of public money to pay tuition at private and parochial schools. The institute represented the pro-voucher parents.
- Swedenburg v. Kelly, 544 U.S. 460 (2005): The court struck down laws in New York and Michigan that made it illegal for consumers to buy wine directly from out-of-state wineries. The institute represented small vintners in Virginia and California. (This case was consolidated with Granholm v. Heald prior to consideration by the Supreme Court.)
- Kelo v. City of New London, 545 U.S. 469 (2005): The court ruled that the state of Connecticut could use eminent domain to take property from the plaintiffs (a group of homeowners) and transfer it to a private business. The institute represented the homeowners.
- Garriott v. Winn, 563 U.S. 125 (2011): The court upheld an Arizona program that gave tax credits for private school tuition. This case was consolidated with Arizona Christian School Tuition Organization v. Winn prior to consideration by the Supreme Court.
- Arizona Free Enterprise Club's Freedom Club PAC v. Bennett, 564 U.S. 721 (2011): The court struck down part of a public campaign financing law in Arizona that provided additional public funding to candidates based on the amount of spending by their opponents. The institute represented several challengers to the law. This case was consolidated with McComish v. Bennett prior to consideration by the Supreme Court.
- Timbs v. Indiana, No. 17-1091, 586 U.S. ___ (2019): The court ruled that the Eighth Amendment's Excessive Fines Clause is an incorporated protection applicable to the States under the Fourteenth Amendment's Due Process Clause, thus grossly disproportionate asset forfeiture is unconstitutional.
- Tennessee Wine and Spirits Retailers Assn. v. Thomas, No. 18-96, 588 U.S. ___ (2019): The court ruled the residency requirement for retail liquor licenses violates the Commerce Clause and the 21st Amendment does not save it.
- Espinoza v. Montana Department of Revenue, No. 18-1195, 591 U.S. ___ (2020): The court ruled that excluding religious schools from a tax-funded scholarship program available to non-religious private schools violates the Free Exercise Clause under a strict scrutiny analysis.
- Brownback v. King, No. 19-546, 592 U.S. ___ (2021): The court ruled that a failure to state a claim ruling in a district court is a judgement on merits and thus triggers the Federal Tort Claims Act's judgement bar, precluding additional claims to be brought under Bivens.
- Carson v. Makin, No. 20-1088, 596 U.S. ___ (2022): The petitioners, represented by the Institute, argued that Maine's requirement that schools be "non-sectarian" to receive tuition assistance violates the First and Fourteenth Amendments. The Supreme Court heard oral arguments in the case on December 8, 2021. The Court decided the case in favor of the plaintiffs on June 21, 2022.
- Gonzalez v. Trevino, No. 22-1025, 602 U.S. ___ (2024)
- Devillier v. Texas, No. 22-913, 602 U.S. ___ (2024) The Institute represented a farmer seeking to be allowed to sue the state of Texas regarding a Fifth Amendment issue. The court agreed with the farmer.

== Litigation ==
The organization provides pro bono legal advice and representation to clients. According to the organization, it selects cases based on the client's ability to pay (giving preference to clients who do not have the means to obtain other representation), and on the case's potential to publicize and educate the public on the issues involved.

=== Occupational licensing ===
IJ opposes many kinds of business licensing. The organization's first case began in 1991, defending Taalib-Din Uqdah, a Washington, DC businessman who owned a salon to braid hair. Local authorities informed Taalib-Din that he would need a cosmetology license in order to continue operating his business. The institute contended that the licensing requirements did not apply to Taalib-Din's business. Further, the organization claimed that the licensing rules in this case were designed to protect existing businesses from competition, with the effect of reducing choice and raising prices for consumers. The case was dismissed in 1992, but later in that year the city council repealed the cosmetology regulations that prevented Taalib-Din from opening his business. While institute co-founders Clint Bolick and Chip Mellor have acknowledged the need for health, safety, and consumer protection regulations, the organization continues to litigate against what it sees as abuse. It has defended a variety of small business owners across the United States in similar cases involving food cart and street vendors, vendors and makers of caskets, florists, interior designers, and independent taxi drivers. In defending tour guide operators in Philadelphia and Washington D.C., the Institute for Justice argued that restrictions on these businesses abridged First Amendment rights.

In 2005, the organization litigated on behalf of small wineries in California and Virginia. The institute's case, Swedenburg v. Kelly, was consolidated with Granholm v. Heald and considered by the Supreme Court. The court ruled that laws in Michigan and New York that prohibited consumers from buying wine directly from out-of-state wineries were unconstitutional.

In 2009, the organization sued to allow donors to be compensated for giving bone marrow. The National Organ Transplant Act of 1984 (NOTA) made it illegal to compensate organ donors but did not prevent payment for other forms of donations (such as human plasma, sperm, and egg cells). Although bone marrow is not an organ or a component of an organ, the act made paying bone marrow donors punishable by up to 5 years in prison. At the time the act was passed, donating bone marrow involved a painful and risky medical procedure. In the years after the act was passed, a new procedure (apheresis) made it possible to harvest bone marrow cells through a non-surgical procedure similar to the donation of blood components such as platelets or plasma. The Institute for Justice lawsuit argued that the development of apheresis meant that donors who gave bone marrow through blood donation should be allowed to receive compensation. The organization predicted that allowing compensation would increase the pool of available donors, and claimed that 3,000 Americans die each year while waiting for compatible marrow donors. Critics argued that allowing compensation could reduce donation, increase the risk of disease, and lead to exploitation of the poor. In December 2011, the Ninth Circuit Court of Appeals ruled unanimously that donors giving bone marrow via apheresis were eligible for compensation. In November 2013, the federal government proposed a regulation that would change legal definitions to cover bone marrow regardless of how it is obtained. This would have the effect of keeping the ban on compensating donors in place. However, HHS withdrew the proposed rule in 2017, clearing the way for compensating those who donate via apheresis.

In 2010, the Institute for Justice filed suit on behalf of monks from Saint Joseph Abbey, a century-old Benedictine monastery in Covington, Louisiana. The monks sold handmade wooden caskets, but the Louisiana Board of Embalmers and Funeral Directors enforced a law requiring anyone who wanted to sell caskets or any funeral merchandise in the state to become a government-licensed funeral director. To secure a license, the monks would need to pass a funeral industry test [FN: La. Rev. Stat. Ann. § 37:848(A).] and convert their monastery into a funeral establishment [FN: La. Rev. Stat. Ann. § 37:848(A); La. Admin. Code tit. 46, §§ 503, 709 & 903.], which would require installing equipment for embalming human remains. [FN: La. Rev. Stat. Ann. § 37:842(D); La. Admin. Code tit. 46, §§ 1105 & 1107.] On March 20, 2013, the U.S. Fifth Circuit Court of Appeals issued a unanimous ruling in favor of the monks holding that laws amounting to "naked transfers of wealth" to politically favored insiders are unconstitutional.

In 2013, the Institute for Justice filed a federal suit on behalf of three independent tax preparers against the Internal Revenue Service. The tax preparers challenged the IRS's imposition of a new licensing system (without congressional authorization) requiring tax preparers to get the IRS's permission before they could work. In January 2013, the U.S. District Court for the District of Columbia ruled the IRS didn't have the power to impose nationwide licensing on tax preparers. In February 2014, the D.C. Circuit Court of Appeals upheld the trial court's ruling.

In July 2017, Airbnb property manager Sally Ladd—represented by the Institute for Justice—filed lawsuit challenging the Pennsylvania Real Estate Commission's effort to require Ladd to obtain a real estate broker's license to manage vacation rental properties. After winning a procedural case before the Pennsylvania Supreme Court in 2020, the Pennsylvania Commonwealth Court held a trial on Ladd's case in 2022 then ruled in October 2022 her favor—a decision the government did not appeal.

In December 2018, the Institute for Justice filed suit on behalf of two would-be estheticians—cosmetologists who specialize in beauty and care of the face—against the Pennsylvania Cosmetology Board. The clients, Courtney Haveman and Amanda Spillane, were denied government-issued licenses to work citing the state's "good moral character" clause because each of them had past criminal offenses. In August 2020, the Pennsylvania Commonwealth Court struck down the good moral standard clause, clearing the way for Haveman and Spillane to reapply for their licenses.

=== Property rights ===
==== Eminent domain ====
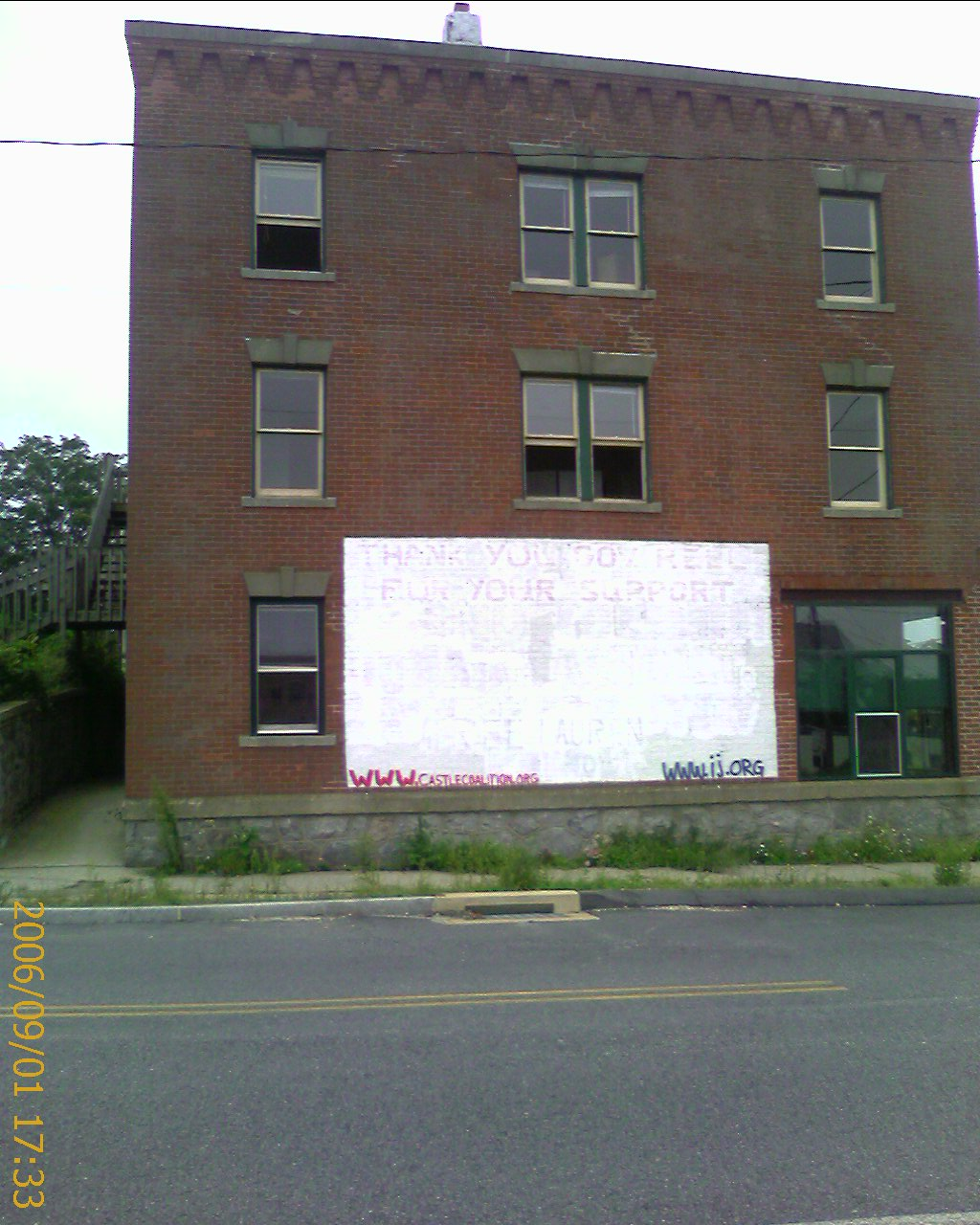
One of the few remaining houses in the Fort Trumbull neighborhood, September 1, 2006. Underneath the white paint can just barely be read the words "Thank you Gov. Rell for your support" and the web URLs of two organizations protesting over-use of eminent domain, the Castle Coalition and the Institute for Justice.

Eminent domain cases pursued by the organization involve instances where a government seeks to condemn a property and transfer it from one private owner to another (as opposed to using it for a road, building, park, or other publicly owned property). The organization gained national attention in 1996, defending a small business owner in a case involving Trump Casino (Casino Reinvestment Development Authority v. Coking), and again in 2005, arguing Kelo v. City of New London before the Supreme Court. In the casino case, a New Jersey state agency (the Casino Reinvestment Development Authority) was attempting to condemn Vera Coking's boarding house, along with two other businesses in Atlantic City, in order to transfer the properties to a business owned by Donald Trump. In 1998, a New Jersey Superior Court judge ruled that the state was not allowed to seize the properties. However, the ruling did not contest the state's right to take property from one private owner for the purpose of giving it to another. The judge based the ruling on the fact that the state did not get a guarantee that the Trump organization would use the property for a new parking area (as promised), instead of using the property for other purposes such as expanding Trump's casino. According to the Institute for Justice, the organization received a "deluge" of requests to participate in other cases of eminent domain abuse after its win in the Coking case. In 2008, organization president Chip Mellor stated:

Frankly, we had not realized just how widespread this phenomenon was until [the Coking case] ... Once we became aware of it, though, we formed a strategic plan to escalate it to national attention and ultimately to the Supreme Court, which we did in the course of the next seven years.

In 2005, the organization represented the plaintiffs in the Supreme Court case Kelo v. City of New London. In this case, the state of Connecticut was attempting to take properties owned by state residents and give them to a private company for use in a development. In a 5-to-4 decision the Supreme Court ruled in favor of the state, affirming the right of states to transfer properties from one private owner to another in this way. The ruling prompted what was widely called a "backlash" against this kind of eminent domain activity. In 2006 (on the first anniversary of the Kelo ruling), President George W. Bush issued an executive order limiting how federal agencies could use eminent domain. Between the Kelo ruling and June 2008, 37 states passed laws to increase restrictions on the use of eminent domain. In 2006, the organization won an eminent domain case in the Ohio Supreme Court, the first eminent domain decision by a state supreme court after Kelo. In the years since, the institute has continued its efforts to reform eminent domain laws.

Since litigating the Kelo case, the Institute for Justice has won eminent domain cases in Lakewood, Ohio, Long Branch, New Jersey, Riviera Beach, Florida, National City, California, Nashville, Tennessee, and Atlantic City, New Jersey.

==== Civil forfeiture ====
The organization seeks to end the use of civil forfeiture and replace it with criminal forfeiture, which would require the government to convict someone of a crime before their property could be taken. Civil forfeiture is the process by which law enforcement agencies in the United States can seize private property, based on the suspicion that the property was used in, or the fruit of, a crime, but without a criminal conviction or, in some cases, even criminal charges being filed. Typically, the law enforcement agencies can keep seized money and apply it to their budgets, though there may be requirements to utilize some or all of the money for specific purposes (e.g., drug and alcohol rehabilitation). State agencies can also confiscate property under federal statutes, and through a program called "equitable sharing" keep up to 80% of the property. The Institute for Justice and other critics argue that this direct financial reward gives law enforcement agencies a strong incentive to abuse civil asset forfeiture. In these cases, the organization occasionally works with other advocacy groups such as the American Civil Liberties Union (ACLU), The Heritage Foundation, and the American Bankers Association.

The Institute for Justice has litigated numerous civil forfeiture cases across the country. Among them:

In 2011, the Institute for Justice represented Russ Caswell, a motel owner from Tewksbury, Massachusetts, after the federal government sought to take his property through civil forfeiture. After a four-day trial in 2013, the U.S. District Court for the District of Massachusetts dismissed the government's forfeiture action.

In 2013, the Institute filed suit on behalf of Terry Dehko a grocery store owner in Fraser, Michigan. Federal agents seized Dehko's bank account without charging him with a crime but claiming he had made frequent deposits of less than $10,000 into his bank account in an effort to avoid bank regulations. Later that year, the IRS returned Dehko's money.

In 2014, the Institute filed three federal suits on behalf of those who had their money or property seized by the government through civil forfeiture:

IJ filed a class action lawsuit against the City of Philadelphia challenging the city's use of civil forfeiture, which often targeted minorities and the poor. In 2018, the city agreed to return $3 million is seized assets to those whose cash and property was taken.

The Institute filed suit on behalf of Iowa restaurant owner Carole Hinders, who had her bank account of $33,000 seized by the IRS, despite never being accused of a crime. Later that year, the IRS agreed to return all of her money.

The Institute filed suit on behalf of Jeffrey, Richard and Mitch Hirsch from Long Island, New York, after the IRS seized $446,000 from their candy and snack wholesale company without filing any criminal complaint against them. The Hirsch brothers had made deposits of under $10,000 into their bank account, which the government called "structuring." In 2015, the IRS agreed to return all of the Hirsch's money.

In 2019, President Donald Trump signed a law that now forbids the IRS from seizing bank accounts based on nothing but the allegation of structuring.

In 2021, the Institute won a legal battle against the Drug Enforcement Administration after it seized $30,000—the life savings—of shoeshine man Kermit Warren as he was traveling through the airport in Columbus, Ohio.

In 2023, the Institute for Justice secured the return of $39,500 to North Carolina shipping company owner Jerry Johnson. Although he earned the money legally and it is not illegal to travel with cash, Phoenix police seized Johnson's money when he flew into Phoenix Sky Harbor International Airport.

Additional Institute for Justice lawsuits successfully challenging civil forfeiture have been filed in North Carolina, Kentucky, New Mexico, Oklahoma, Connecticut, Wyoming and elsewhere.

==== Property searches ====
The Institute for Justice has litigated numerous cases challenging what it sees as the unconstitutional searching of private property. Among its areas of litigation are:

===== Warrantless searches of rental properties =====
The Institute has successfully challenged unconstitutional rental inspection requirements in Marietta, Georgia and Park Forest, Illinois.

===== Government searches of "open fields" =====
Today, the government may inspect and place cameras on private property without a warrant or the property owner's consent as long as this does not include the area immediately surrounding the property owner's home. This is known as the open fields doctrine. The Institute for Justice is challenging such searches in Pennsylvania and Tennessee.

Moreover, several state courts have rejected the open fields doctrine under their own state constitutional search-and-seizure provisions. [Proposed cite: See, e.g., Faulkner v. State, 98 So. 691 (Miss. 1924); State v. Bullock, 901 P.2d 61 (Mont. 1995); People v. Scott, 593 N.E.2d 1328 (N.Y. 1992); State v. Dixson, 766 P.2d 1015 (Or. 1988); Welch v. State, 289 S.W. 510 (Tenn. 1926); State v. Kirchoff, 587 A.2d 988 (Vt. 1991); State v. Johnson, 879 P.2d 984 (Wash. Ct. App. 1994).]

===== Fines and fees =====
Local governments impose fines and fees for minor traffic violations and property code violations to fund their budgets without raising taxes. Such actions, however, create financial incentives for municipalities to maximize revenue rather than address public safety issues.

The Institute for Justice continues to litigate cases challenging excessive and arbitrary government-imposed fines and fees in:

Pagedale, Missouri, where the city could fine residents for having mismatched curtains, walking on the left-hand side of a crosswalk and having barbeques in the front of a home, among other infractions. The U.S. Department of Justice cited the excessive use of fines and fees as among the issues that sparked the riots in nearby Ferguson, Missouri. In 2018, the U.S. District Court for the Eastern District of Missouri finalized a consent decree in which Pagedale agreed to eliminate its municipal code dealing with fines and fees for what it deemed "nuisance" behaviors.

Charlestown, Indiana, where the mayor had imposed fines against low-income homeowners in an effort to help a developer secure the land for a new development project.

Brookside, Alabama, where the municipality of 1,253 residents saw fines and fees rise by 640 percent in four years to pay for half of the city government's income.

In 2019, the Institute for Justice won Timbs v. Indiana, a U.S. Supreme Court that for the first time that held the U.S. Constitution's 8th amendment protection against excessive fines applies to state and local governments.

=== Freedom of speech ===
==== Occupational licensing and speech ====
In 1997, the Institute filed suit on behalf of Internet and software publishers challenging registration requirements by the Commodity Futures Trading Commission. The CFTC sought to require the publishers to register with the commission before they could offer generalized opinions on commodity markets. In 1999, U.S. District Court Judge Ricardo Urbina struck down the registration requirement as unconstitutional. In 2000, the CFTC adopted a new rule stating that those who published impersonal, standardized commodity trading advice no longer needed to register with the government, thus ending the litigation and marking one of the earliest protections for free speech among Internet and software publishers.

In 2003, the Institute for Justice challenged California's requirement that—unlike newspapers or magazines—Internet advertising companies, including its client ForSaleByOwner.com, had to secure a government-issued real estate brokers license before they could provide information online. In 2004, the U.S. District Court in Sacramento struck down the law as "wholly arbitrary." The Institute for Justice won a similar victory before the U.S. District Court for the District of New Hampshire in 2008 on behalf of ZeroBrokerFees.com.

In 2013, newspaper columnist John Rosemond filed suit against the Kentucky Board of Examiners of Psychology when it ordered him to stop publishing his advice column in Kentucky newspapers because it constituted the unlicensed practice of psychology. That same year, the Institute for Justice won a similar free speech case on behalf of North Carolina blogger Steve Cooksey, known as "the caveman blogger," who had been told by the North Carolina Board of Dietetics/Nutrition that he could not provide dietary advice without first receiving a license from the state.

The Institute for Justice has litigated several occupational speech cases on behalf of tour guides in Philadelphia, Pennsylvania, Washington, D.C., Savannah, Georgia, and Charleston, South Carolina and on behalf of interior designers in New Mexico, Texas, Connecticut, Oklahoma and Florida.

==== Political speech ====
In 2006, the Institute for Justice filed a successful suit against the Colorado Attorney General challenging the state's campaign finance laws for stifling free speech. Residents of Parker North, Colorado, who had engaged in a grassroots effort to stop the annexation of their neighborhood into the town of Parker had spent more than $200 in their campaign and were then subject to the state's campaign finance reporting requirements, which included registering with the state, tracking and reporting all contributions and expenditures, and disclosing the identities of anyone who contributed money to their efforts. In 2010, the U.S. 10th Circuit Court of Appeals ruled that the state's ballot-issue registration and disclosure laws violated the First Amendment as applied to the grassroots group.

In 2010, the Institute won a federal lawsuit before the en banc U.S. District Court for the District of Columbia on behalf of SpeechNow.org. As a result of the ruling, the Federal Election Commission could not ban an independent group of citizens from accepting unlimited donations to advocate regarding ballot issues. This led to the creation of super PACs.

In 2011, the Institute for Justice argued and won a landmark U.S. Supreme Court ruling in Arizona Free Enterprise Club's Freedom Club PAC v. Bennett, which struck down Arizona's "matching funds" provision. Under Arizona's law, the government gave publicly funded candidates additional funds when privately funded candidates and independent groups spent more than the amounts allotted to publicly funded candidates.

In 2013, the Institute won challenges to grassroots political speech in Mississippi and Arizona.

In 2018, IJ earned a victory in Holland v. Williams, a case that ultimately led to the complete invalidation of Colorado's private enforcement system of campaign finance laws.

==== Retaliation ====
Investigative journalist and author Carla Main was sued for defamation by developer H. Walker Royall after Main wrote a book exposing his efforts to use eminent domain to remove a family-owned business in Freeport, Texas to make way for a luxury marina development. The Institute for Justice represented Main for free and won on her behalf before the Texas Fifth District Court of Appeals.

IJ won a similar legal fight on behalf of Kelly Gallaher, a citizen journalist from Mount Pleasant, Wisconsin, who was sued by the village attorney after Gallaher criticized him.

==== Commercial speech ====
In 2017, the 11th U.S. Circuit Court of Appeals ruled unanimously in favor of a Florida dairy farmer represented by the Institute for Justice who challenged the state's regulation that banned her from using the term "skim milk" for her product.

Through litigation, media relations and lobbying, the Institute has successfully challenged five interior-design "titling laws" (in Connecticut, Florida, New Mexico, Oklahoma, and Texas) which restricted its clients' advertising of their services. IJ did likewise on behalf of an engineer in Oregon who challenged a city's red-light cameras.

==== Signs ====
The Institute for Justice challenged Redmond, Washington when it banned Blazing Bagels from using portable signs but allowed portable signs for real estate companies. Ultimately, the 9th U.S. Circuit Court of Appeals ruled in favor of Blazing Bagels owner Dennis Ballen that the ban amounted to content-based discrimination of free speech. The Institute successfully challenged a similar ban in Lynnwood, Washington on behalf of the Futon Factory.

In 2016, in a case the U.S. Supreme Court sided with the Institute for Justice's clients then remanded to the lower court, IJ challenged Norfolk, Virginia's effort to ban a property owner from hanging a large sign protesting the government's taking of his property through eminent domain. The final ruling in that case was handed down by the U.S. Fourth Circuit Court of Appeals.

In 2020, the Institute successfully defended the owners of Lonesome Dove saloon in Mandan, North Dakota after the city started fining the establishment for having its business name in a mural on the side of its building.

=== School vouchers and private schools ===
The organization has litigated several cases related to education reform and school vouchers, including four successful cases that went to the Supreme Court: Zelman v. Simmons-Harris (2002), Garriott v. Winn (2010), Espinoza v. Montana Department of Revenue (2020) and Carson v. Makin. In the Zelman case, the Supreme Court ruled that parents can use public money (in the form of school vouchers) to pay tuition at private schools, including parochial schools. The Institute represented parents in that case. In the Garriott case, the court dismissed a challenge to a program in Arizona that gave state tax credits for contributions to charitable organizations that provided scholarships for private school tuition. The institute argued in favor of dismissal. In the Espinoza case, the court ruled that Montana could not prohibit families from using tuition scholarships, which were funded by tax credit-eligible contributions to nonprofit scholarship organizations, at religiously affiliated schools. In the Carson case, the court ruled that Maine could not exclude children from a publicly funded tuition assistance program because their parent's selected schools that provide religious instruction as part of their curriculum.

== Activism and coalitions ==
The institute maintains training programs, activism networks, and partnerships with other organizations.

The IJ Clinic on Entrepreneurship is a joint project of the Institute for Justice and the University of Chicago Law School. The clinic provides free legal services for startups and other entrepreneurs in economically disadvantaged communities in the Chicago area.

The organization provides educational opportunities for law students, such as a yearly conference for law students at George Washington University. According to the Institute for Justice, participants in the conference, along with the organization's former law clerks and interns, can join the institute's "Human Action Network". The institute offers to match network members with volunteer and pro-bono opportunities in their local communities. The organization also recruits volunteers for its "Liberty in Action" project, for support activism by non-lawyers. The institute founded the Castle Coalition in 2002 to provide more specific tools for activists in the area of eminent domain abuse.

== Finances ==
IJ operates as a 501(c)(3) tax-exempt nonprofit. Charity Navigator has given the institute a four-star rating (out of four) for financial transparency and efficiency in each year since it began evaluating charities in 2001. At its founding, the Institute received $350,000/year from Charles Koch.

According to the institute, 85 percent of contributions in 2012 came from individuals, with 14 percent coming from foundations and 1 percent coming from businesses. As of 2005, IJ did not actively solicit corporate donations. According to information provided to the Internal Revenue Service, the organization spent about $12.8 million in the fiscal year ending June 2013. In that year, 83.2% of money spent went to the programs and services the institute delivers, with the rest going to administrative expenses (9.4%) and fund-raising expenses (7.2%).

== See also ==
- Dana Berliner, Litigation Director at the Institute for Justice
- Libertarian theories of law
