= Goldwater Institute =

Conservative and libertarian public policy think tank

- Established: 1988; 38 years ago
- President: Victor Riches
- Chair: Tom Hatten
- Staff: 47 (2023)
- Budget: Revenue: $13.2 million Expenses: $11.1 million (FYE December 2025)
- Endowment: $26.3 million (2025)
- Address: 500 East Coronado Road; Phoenix, Arizona 85004
- Location: Phoenix
- Coordinates: 33°28′04″N 112°03′57″W
- Interactive map of Goldwater Institute
- Website: goldwaterinstitute.org

The Goldwater Institute is a conservative and libertarian public policy think tank located in Phoenix, Arizona, whose stated mission is "to defend and strengthen the freedom guaranteed to all Americans in the constitutions of the United States and all fifty states". The organization was established in 1988 with the support of former senator Barry Goldwater.

The Goldwater Institute was primarily a public policy research organization until 2007 when it added a litigation arm, becoming the first state-based policy organization to do so. Goldwater's litigation arm, the Scharf-Norton Center for Constitutional Litigation, engages in lawsuits against government entities across the United States.

== Overview ==
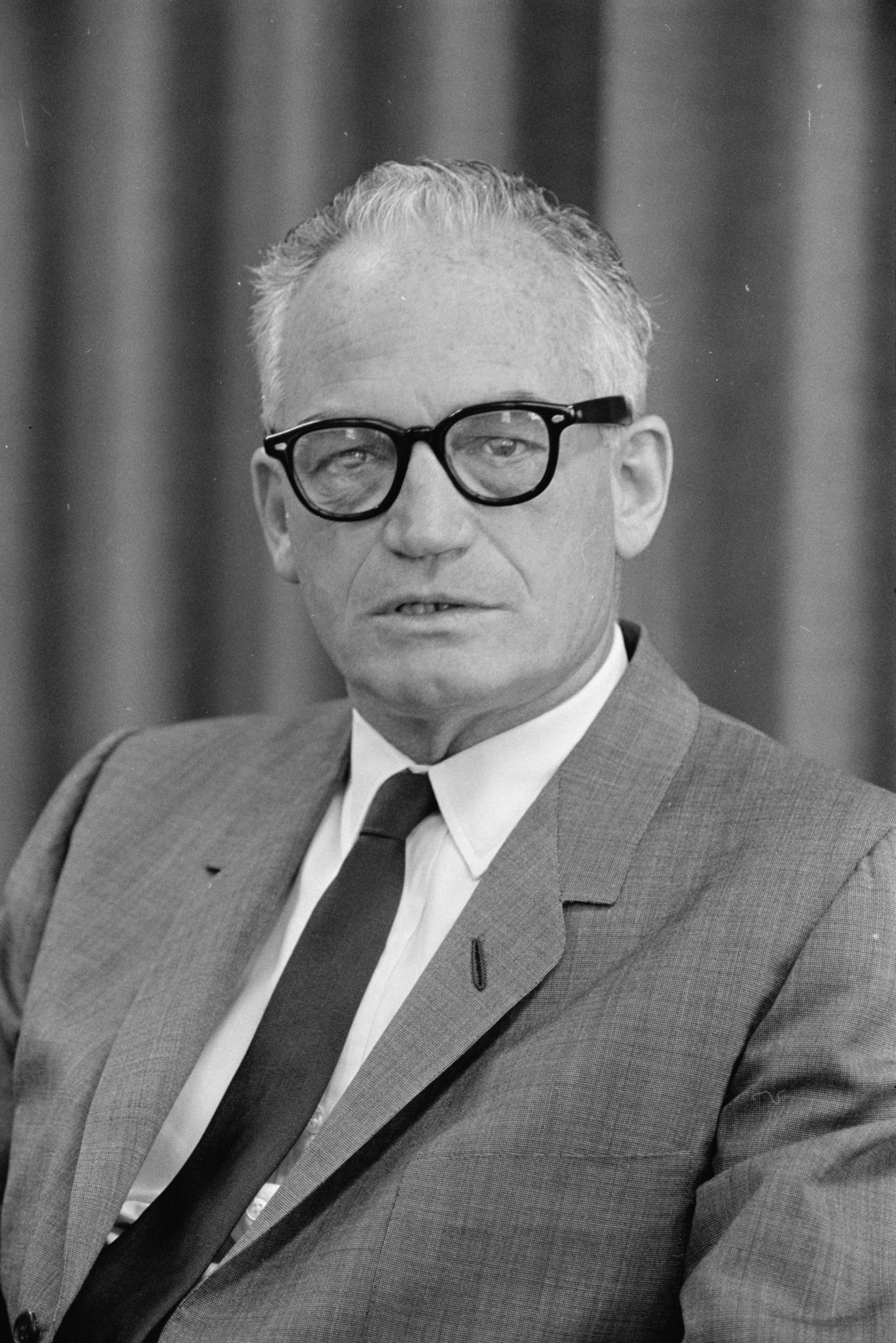
Senator Barry Goldwater, the institute's namesake

The Goldwater Institute was founded in 1988 by conservative activists with the blessing of Barry Goldwater. It is registered with the IRS as a 501(c)(3) nonprofit organization. Victor Riches was named president and CEO on July 10, 2017. Darcy A. Olsen previously served as the institute's president, having joined Goldwater in 2001 as executive director. The organization's board of directors includes Barry Goldwater Jr.

The Goldwater Institute is a proponent of increased educational choice through charter schools and school vouchers. The organization has helped state lawmakers draft "right to try" laws, which allow terminally ill individuals to try experimental medications that have not yet been approved by the Food and Drug Administration.

The Goldwater Institute is a member of the American Legislative Exchange Council. The organization has ties to the Koch family and the Walton Family Foundation.

== Public interest litigation ==
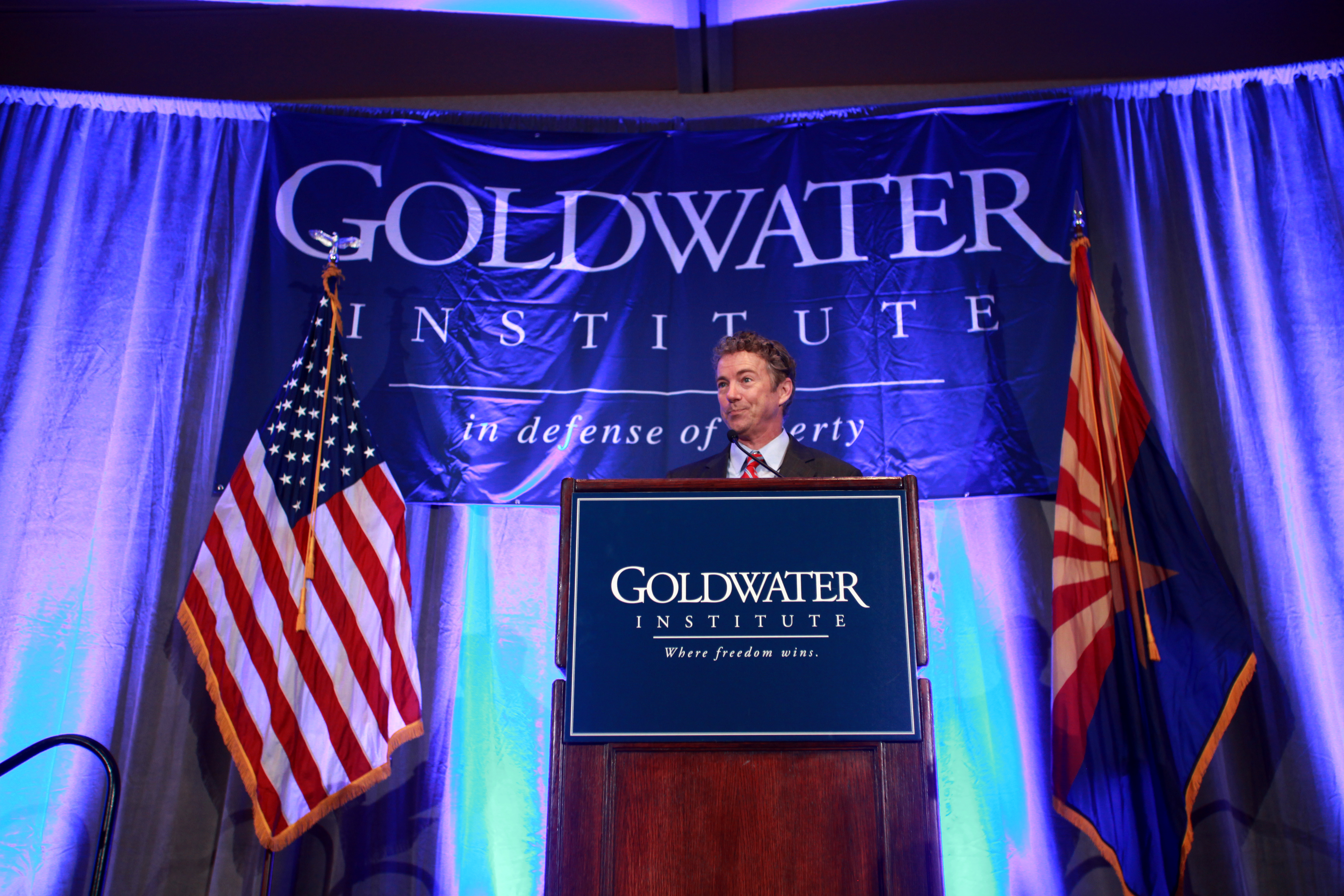
Senator Rand Paul speaking at the Goldwater Institute dinner in 2014

The Goldwater Institute created the Scharf-Norton Center for Constitutional Litigation in June 2007. The center, previously directed by lawyer Clint Bolick, engages in lawsuits against federal, state and local governmental bodies to advocate adherence to constitutional law and to protect individual rights such as property rights and entrepreneurial freedom from potential government intrusion.

In Turken v. Gordon, the Goldwater Institute sued the city of Phoenix over a $100 million corporate subsidy to the CityNorth development, which the Institute argued was illegal under the Arizona Constitution.

In another case, Preston v. Hallman, the Goldwater Institute successfully sued the city of Tempe, Arizona on behalf of a tattoo parlor owner whose permit to operate was denied by the city council though it complied with zoning laws. In 2010, the Goldwater Institute successfully defended the right of voters to wear Tea Party T-shirts to the polls.

In Tombstone v. United States, the Goldwater Institute sued on behalf of the City of Tombstone, Arizona which had been denied permission to use machinery to repair its water lines in an environmentally sensitive area.

In February 2015, the Goldwater Institute filed suit in Massachusetts, challenging the state's century-old ban on corporate contributions to political candidates.

In November 2017, the Goldwater Institute threatened to sue on behalf of UCF Knights football kicker Donald De La Haye, who was earlier in the year kicked off the team for ineligibility. De La Haye sued UCF over this matter in July 2018, settling in November 2018 to finish his education there.
