= Desert Ridge Marketplace =

Shopping mall in Phoenix, Arizona

Coordinates: 33.676061°N 111.971546°W

- Location: Phoenix, Arizona
- Address: 21001 N Tatum Blvd.
- Opened: December 2001
- Developer: Vestar Development Co.
- Manager: Vestar Development Co.
- Owner: Vestar Development Co.
- Architect: SGPA Architecture & Planning, MCG Architecture
- Num. of stores: 100+
- Floor area: 1.2 million square feet (111,000 m2)
- Parking: 5,815 spaces
- Website: https://shopdesertridge.com/

Desert Ridge Marketplace is a super-regional shopping mall located just off the Loop 101 and Tatum Boulevard in North Phoenix, Arizona. It was built by Vestar Development Co. and opened in December 2001. The mall has a gross leasable area of 1.2 million square feet (111,000 m^{2}). The mall was targeted at upscale residents of the north East Valley, and of Scottsdale, a five-minute drive from the mall via the freeway.

The mall was revamped in 2017 with a repaint of stores, a fountain installed in the entrance and a new, modern logo.

The mall is organized with a central area called "The District" which includes smaller boutiques, shops and restaurants. The outer perimeter includes larger stores, a grocery store and gas station. The District has a splash pad and fireplace in the central area with outdoor seating available.
