= Scott Bullock =

American lawyer

- Born: Guantánamo Bay, Cuba
- Education: Grove City College (BA); University of Pittsburgh (JD)
- Occupation: Civil rights attorney
- Awards: Drum Major for Justice Award (2002)
- Website: Official website

Scott G. Bullock is an American lawyer who has focused on property rights issues such as eminent domain and civil forfeiture. He has been president and chief counsel at the Institute for Justice since 2016, a nonprofit libertarian public interest law firm. He represented Susette Kelo in Kelo v. City of New London, an eminent domain case decided by the Supreme Court in 2005. Bullock was a senior attorney before becoming the president of the institute and litigated many cases on the state and federal level.

== Education ==
Bullock was born in Guantanamo Bay, Cuba, and grew up in suburban Pittsburgh, Pennsylvania. He received his B.A. in economics and philosophy from Grove City College and his J.D. degree from the University of Pittsburgh School of Law. After an internship at the Cato Institute, Bullock joined the Institute for Justice at its founding in 1991.

== Career ==
Bullock was lead co-counsel in the 2005 Supreme Court case Kelo v. City of New London. After the decision by the high court to allow the City of New London to seize the homes and businesses of current residences to make room for a "90-acre office, hotel, and housing complex", Bullock said that it was "a sad day for the country and a sad day for the Constitution."

In the wake of Kelo, he and the institute led state court litigation and grassroots efforts to challenge eminent domain for private development.

Bullock has also successfully challenged eminent domain abuse in Ohio, New Jersey, Tennessee and Mississippi.

Bullock has advocated against government use of civil forfeiture. He has said that when the police pull drivers over for minor traffic infractions and seize their cash, they do not "respect fundamental notions of due process". He represented Russ Caswell when the police tried to seize Caswell's motel in Tewksbury, Massachusetts after incidents of illegal drug activity on the premises.

He called the practice of equitable sharing, in which state and federal law enforcement share the proceeds of seized assets, a violation of federalism. He has been involved in First Amendment cases, including those commercial speech cases.

He was the lead attorney in an Institute for Justice case establishing protection for the right to earn a living where the Fifth Circuit Court of Appeals struck down a licensing requirement for a group of monks in Louisiana who wanted to sell handmade wooden caskets.

Bullock has shared his views on constitutional issues in publications such as The New York Times and The Wall Street Journal as well as in broadcast media such as 60 Minutes, ABC Nightly News, and National Public Radio.

During his career as an attorney and president of the Institute for Justice, the organization has litigated twelve cases before the U.S. Supreme Court, winning ten of those cases.
