= William Tennent (disambiguation) =

William Tennent (1673–1746) was an American minister.

William Tennent may also refer to:

== Related ==
- William Tennent Jr., son of William Tennent and predecessor to the Princeton theologians
- William Tennent III (1740–1777), grandson of William Tennent and figure in South Carolina in the American Revolution
- William Tennent High School, Bucks County, Pennsylvania school named for him

== Others ==
- William Tennent (sportsman) (1845–1883), British 100 yards champion and cricketer who played for Lancashire CCC
- William Blair Tennent, New Zealand politician

== See also ==
- William Tennant (disambiguation)
