= Southampton, Pennsylvania =

Unincorporated community in Pennsylvania, US

Southampton
- Unincorporated community
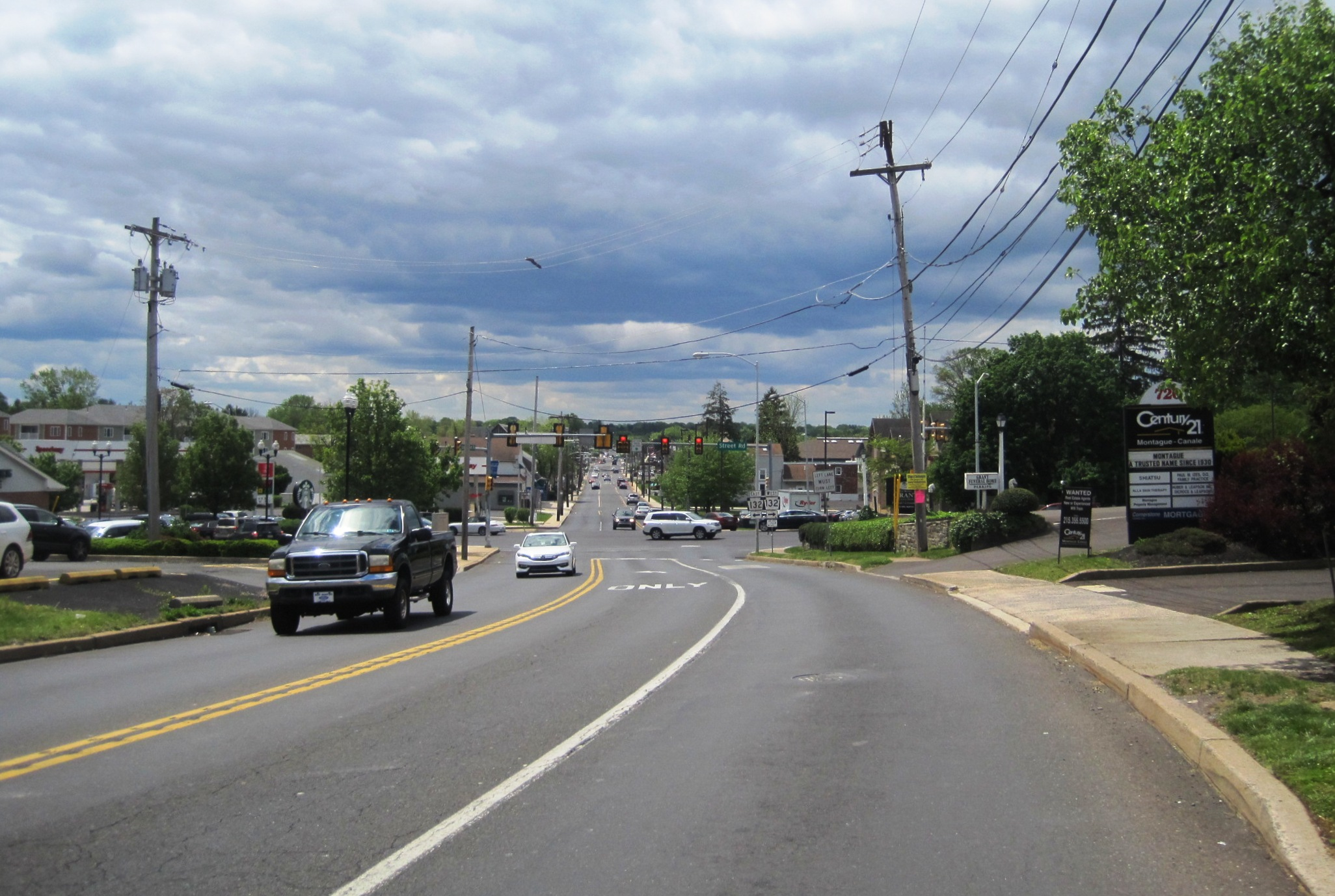
- Approaching PA 132 from PA 232 southbound

- Location of Southampton in Pennsylvania
- Coordinates: 40°10′27″N 75°02′38″W
- Country: United States
- State: Pennsylvania
- County: Bucks
- Township: Upper Southampton
- Elevation: 256 ft (78 m)
- Time zone: UTC-5 (EST)
  - Summer (DST): UTC-4 (EDT)
- ZIP code: 18966
- Area codes: 215, 267 and 445

Southampton is an unincorporated community located in Upper Southampton Township, Bucks County, Pennsylvania.

== Geography ==
Southampton is 18 miles north, from the center of Philadelphia. Its ZIP Code is 18966. Portions of this ZIP Code can also be addressed as Churchville or Holland.

The town is located in the lower central part of Bucks County, Pennsylvania, and is directly bordered by Montgomery County to the west. It lies within the Townships of Upper Southampton and Northampton.

Upper Southampton Township is part of the Centennial School District, and is served by William Tennent High School, located in nearby Warminster. Northampton Township is part of the Council Rock School District. Most of Northampton Township is served by Council Rock High School South, located within Southampton (addressed as Holland), while some students are zoned to Council Rock High School North in nearby Newtown Township. Students in both districts may also attend Middle Bucks Institute of Technology, a part time vocational school in nearby Jamison.

== History ==
Southampton, Pennsylvania is a namesake of Southampton, England, from where the followers of William Penn set sail to the Province of Pennsylvania. By 1685, Southampton was recognized by the Provincial Council as a township, and the lands within its borders had been allocated to thirteen original purchasers: John Luff, John Martin, Robert Pressmore, Richard Wood, John Jones, Mark Betres, John Swift, Enoch Flowers, Joseph Jones, Thomas Groom, Robert Marsh, Thomas Hould and John Gilbert, whose tracts were delineated on a Map of the Improved Part of the Province of Pennsylvania, drafted by Thomas Holme, Pennsylvania's Surveyor General.

Southampton's boundaries at that time extended eastward to Bensalem, and it was not until 1929 that the township was divided into "Upper Southampton" and "Lower Southampton". Its immediate bordering towns are now Feasterville, Huntingdon Valley, Warminster, and Churchville.

In order to ensure peaceful coexistence with the Indians residing in this region, Penn purchased the land with wampum and other valuable commodities including items of clothing, fish hooks, axes, knives and other useful tools. The area between the Pennypack and Neshaminy Creeks, encompassing Southampton Township, was conveyed by the Lenni-Lenape Chief Tamanend to William Penn by Deed dated June 23, 1683.

Many of the first English settlers were Quakers who fled religious persecution, and it was a group of dissident Quakers who joined with members of the Pennepek Baptist Church (a.k.a. Lower Dublin) to form the Southampton Baptist Church, which was constituted in 1746. Dutch colonists arrived in Southampton in the 18th century – the Vandikes, Vansandts, Vanartsdalens, Cornells, Krewsons and Hogelands – who migrated south from Long Island, New York and settled in Smoketown, later to be called Churchville after the North and Southampton Reformed Church erected on Bristol Road. The churchyards adjacent to the Southampton Baptist and North and Southampton Reformed Churches contain graves of patriots who fought in the Revolutionary War.

Farming was the way of life for most Southampton residents throughout the 18th and 19th Centuries, and roads were constructed from farm to mill, to market and to church. Second Street Pike was the thoroughfare used to carry produce by horse and wagon to the markets in Philadelphia. In the mid-19th century the villages of Davisville, Churchville, and Southamptonville (formerly "Fetter's Corner") sprouted at the various crossroads in the township, and Second Street Pike became a toll road.

In 1785 inventor John Fitch was living in Warminster and tested a 23" model of a steamboat in a small stream on his friend Joseph Longstreth’s property, behind the current General Davis House on Street Road, on the western end of what is now Upper Southampton Township. The steamboat is memorialized on Upper Southampton Township's seal.

The railroad arrived in the 1870s and brought with it many changes. "Southamptonville" was shortened to Southampton, and farmers now had a faster and more efficient way to market their milk and produce. Tradesmen and craftsmen opened shops along Second Street Pike, and residents began commuting into Philadelphia.

Changes continued through the 20th Century. Electricity and telephone lines were installed, and Street Road has been widened (1969–1970) and a railroad overpass constructed, necessitating the removal and/or demolition of the toll house, several shops and residences.

Public education began in the mid-19th Century and one-room schoolhouses once stood at Street Road and Gravel Hill, and on County Line Road just west of Buck Road. Southamptonville's former one-room schoolhouse has been enlarged to such an extent that it is no longer recognizable as such, but stands in its original location on the south side of Street Road near the railroad overpass. The Original "Southampton High School" was later converted and expanded into Shelmire Elementary School (now First Children Academy) when the new Centennial School District's William Tennent High School was built in 1953.

The first public school in the village of Davisville, known as the Davisville Seminary, remains on its original site on the South Side of Street Road – next to the Dairy Queen. The Seminary was used in more recent times as an overflow classroom for the "stone school" (C.H.I. Institute).

Upper Southampton Township has embraced industry and development, but retains a certain small-town feeling despite rapid growth in the post-war years, and again in the 1980s and 1990s.
