= Southampton High School =

Southampton High School may refer to:

- Southampton High School (Southampton, New York)
- Southampton High School (Courtland, Virginia)
- Southampton High School (Upper Southampton, Pennsylvania), a closed school in Centennial School District
