= Bernert =

Bernert is a surname. Notable people with the surname include:

- Brandi Bernert, American sprinter and bronze medalist at the 2015 World Masters Athletics Championships
- Dieter Bernert, drummer for German metal band Brainstorm
- Eleanor H. Bernert (1920–2021), American sociologist
- Franz Bernert (1876–1890), Apostolic Vicar of Saxony
- Fritz Otto Bernert (1893–1918), German World War I fighter ace
- Joe Bernert, American CEO of Havis, Inc.
- Kristin Bernert, American manager of New York Liberty women's basketball team for 2015–2016
- Martyna Bernert, Polish soccer player for 1. FC Katowice
- Michael James Bernert, 2005 Intel ISEF finalist and namesake of asteroid 21505 Bernert
- Suzanne Bernert (born 1982), German-born actress in Indian films
- Traude Bernert (1915–1998), Austrian physicist

== See also ==
- 21505 Bernert, a main-belt asteroid
