= John Redman (physician) =

American physician

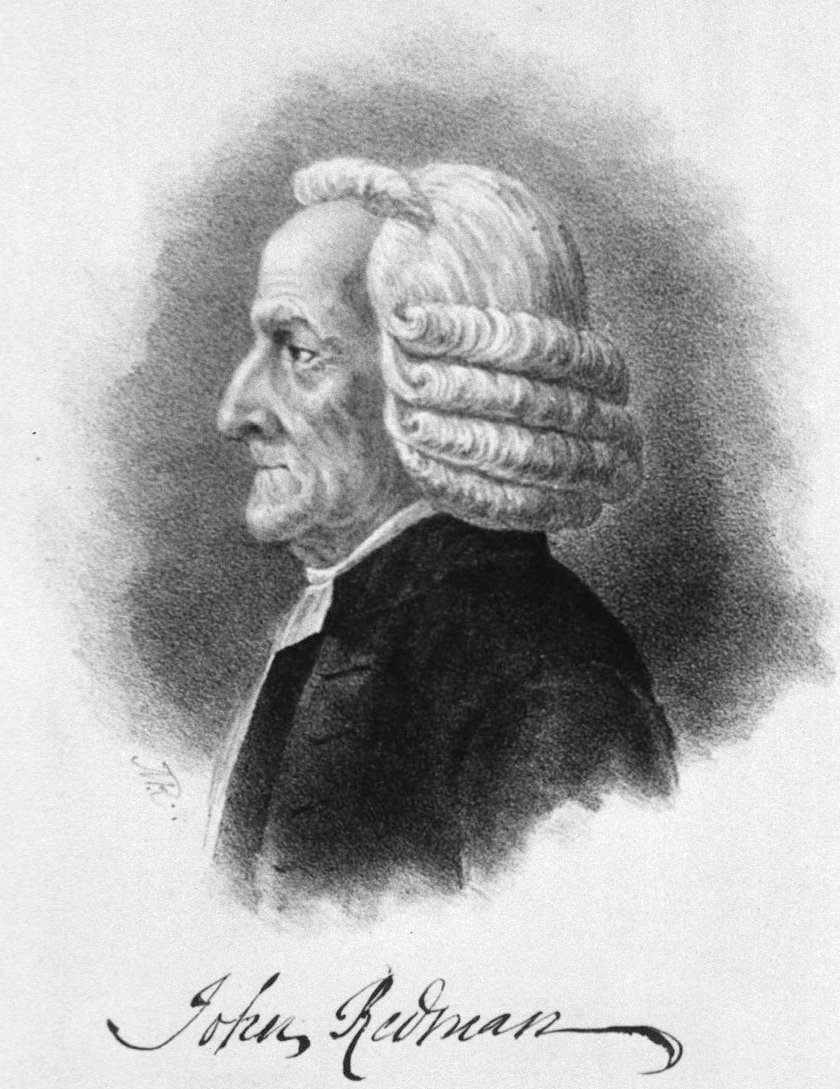
John Redman

Dr. John Redman (February 22, 1722 – March 19, 1808) was the first president of The College of Physicians of Philadelphia and the medical preceptor of Benjamin Rush.

Born in Philadelphia, Pennsylvania, after finishing his preparatory education in William Tennent's Log College, he began studying physic with John Kearsley Mitchell, then one of the most eminent physicians of Philadelphia. He began practicing in Bermuda, and continued for several years.

Redman then moved to Europe to further study medicine. He lived one year in Edinburgh, attended lectures and dissections, and visited the hospitals in Paris. He matriculated 6 October 1747 at the University of Leyden and graduated at the same university 15 July 1748. The title description of his thesis is: Dissertatio medica inauguralis De abortu ... - Lugduni Batavorum : Apud Conradum Wishoff, [1748]. - 31 p.; 24 cm After working for a time at Guy’s Hospital, he returned to America and again settled in Philadelphia, where he soon gained great celebrity. While there he gained membership in the American Philosophical Society through his election in 1768. Many of Philadelphia's leading doctors studied under him, including John Morgan, Benjamin Rush, and Caspar Wistar. In 1784 he was elected an elder of the Second Presbyterian Church.

He was a man of small stature, of good sense and learning, and respected in his day.

He became independently wealthy, and retired from business many years before his death. He used to visit his old friends and acquaintances after he became infirm from age, on a fat pony mare. Dr. James Rush says, "I remember him well hitching her to the turnbuckle of the mansion shutter, so that she always stood on the foot-pavement, where he visited my father, which he made it a point to do once or twice a year. In the rough cutting of his likeness, which was given to me by a member of his family, the hat, wig, nose, mouth, chin, eye, dress, person, expression, and character are admirably true. The mare is not so well done. The doctor retired from practice about 1785, and was known to the public as an antiquated-looking old gentleman. He was usually habited in a broad-skirted dark coat, with long pocket-flaps, buttoned across his under dress, and wearing, in strict conformity to the cut of the coat, a pair of Baron Steuben’s military-shaped boots, coming above the knees." Mr. Watson says, for riding-habit, "his hat flapped before and cocked up smartly behind, covering a full-bottomed powdered wig, in the front of which might be seen an eagle-pointed nose, separating a pair of piercing black eyes, his lips exhibiting, but only now and then, a quick motion, as though at the moment he was endeavoring to extract the essence of a small quid. As thus described in habit and in person, he was to be seen almost daily, in fair weather, mounted on a short, fat, black, switch-tailed mare, and riding for his amusement and exercise, in a brisk racking canter, about the streets and suburbs of the city."

He died of apoplexy, March 19, 1808, in the same house in which he lived for more than half a century, on Second Street, about one-third of a square from Arch, on the west side, next to Dr. Ustick's Baptist Church. He was predeceased by his youngest daughter, in 1806, and his wife.
