= Havis =

Havis may refer to:

- Havis, Inc., an American manufacturing company

== People with the surname ==
- Allan Havis (born 1951), American playwright

== See also ==
- Havis Amanda, a statue in Helsinki, Finland
