= Leary Elementary School =

Leary Elementary School may refer to:

- F G Leary Elementary School, British Columbia
- Leary Elementary School (Warminster, Pennsylvania)
