= William Tennant =

William Tennant may refer to:

- William Tennant (poet) (1784–1848), Scottish scholar and poet
- William Tennant (Royal Navy officer) (1890–1963), captain of HMS Repulse
- William Tennant (United Irishmen) (1759–1832), Ulster Presbyterian banker and revolutionary
- Billy Tennant (footballer) (William Tennant; 1865–1927), English footballer

== See also ==
- Sir William Tennant Gairdner (1824–1907), professor of medicine in the University of Glasgow
- William Tennent (disambiguation)
