= William Tennent High School =

Coordinates: 40.1832°N 75.0699°W

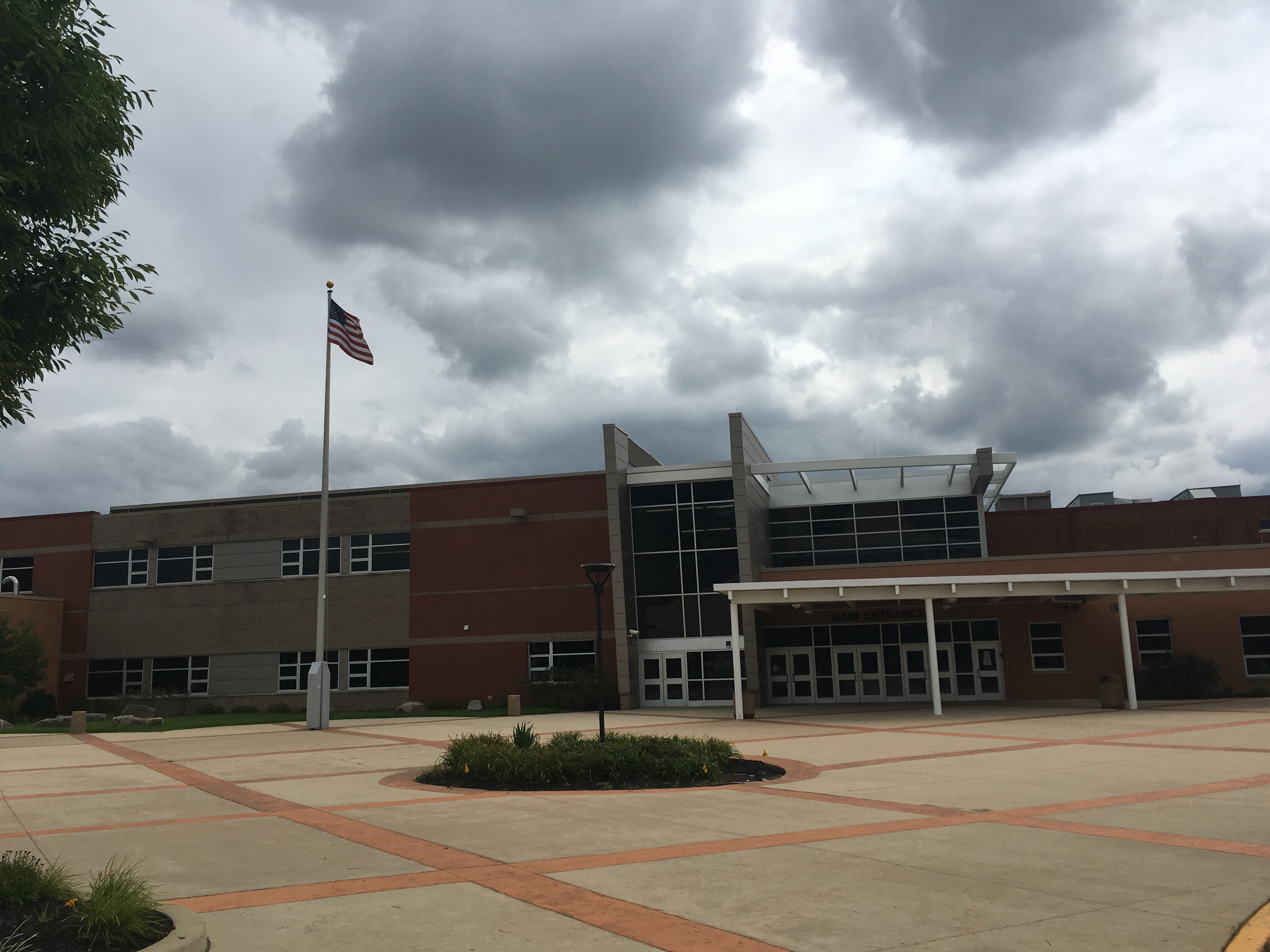
- Entrance to William Tennent High School

Location
- 333 Centennial Rd; Warminster, Pennsylvania; United States

Information
- Type: Public
- Established: 1955 (original building), 1974 ("A" building, now demolished), 2011 (Mostly new, includes "B" building from the previous school, open to students)
- Teaching staff: 130.00 (FTE)
- Enrollment: 1,764 (2023–2024)
- Student to teacher ratio: 13.57
- Colors: Black, White, and Red
- Mascot: Panther
- Website: wths.centennialsd.org

William Tennent High School is a public high school serving grades 9 through 12, located in Warminster, Pennsylvania, US.

The school is the only public high school serving Warminster and Upper Southampton Townships and the Ivyland borough in the Centennial School District, located in Bucks County, Pennsylvania. The school replaced the Southampton High School located in Upper Southampton.

The school was named in honor of William Tennent, Presbyterian minister and founder of the original Log College, a very early theological school located in the colony of Pennsylvania. The first William Tennent High School building was located across the street from the current high school and when both were in use, the buildings were called William Tennent Intermediate High School (grades 9 and 10) and William Tennent Senior High School (grades 11 and 12) (the current school). The site of the original Log College is located near the modern high school.

== Notable alumni ==
- Brian Baker (Class of 1985) – actor, former Sprint pitchman
- Steve Capus – president of NBC News: 2005–13; currently executive producer of CBS News
- Kermit Cintron (Class of 1999) – champion boxer
- Frank Coonelly (Class of 1978) – President, Pittsburgh Pirates
- Thomas W. Druce (Class of 1979) – former Pennsylvania State Representative
- Len Hatzenbeller (Class of 1977) – professional basketball player
- Bernie O'Neill - former Pennsylvania State Representative
- Josh Ostrander (Class of 1998) – musician
- Mike Pettine – head coach, Cleveland Browns, was a head coach for the school before being terminated
- Ryan Richter (Class of 2007) – head coach, Philadelphia Union.
- Mike Vogel (Class of 1998) – actor

== Feeder schools ==
=== Middle schools ===
Log College Middle School
Eugene Klinger Middle School

=== Elementary schools ===
McDonald Elementary
Willow Dale Elementary
Davis Elementary
