= Milton Santiago =

Puerto Rican boxer

Personal information
- Nickname: El Santo
- Born: Milton Santiago, Jr. September 15, 1996 (age 29) Lajas, Puerto Rico
- Height: 5 ft 8 in (1.73 m)
- Weight: Light welterweight

Boxing career
- Stance: Orthodox

Boxing record
- Total fights: 12
- Wins: 12
- Win by KO: 3
- Losses: 0
- Draws: 0
- No contests: 0

Milton Santiago, Jr. (born September 15, 1996) is a Puerto Rican professional boxer in the light welterweight division.

== Early life and amateur career ==
Santiago was born in Warminster, PA, residing in Northeast Philadelphia early in his childhood. Shortly afterwards, his family relocated to Pennsylvania, settling in Warminster. Born into a boxing family, which also includes former world champion Kermit Cintron, Santiago frequently accompanied his father to a local gym, competing in his first fight at the age of eight. Milton Santiago, Sr. has been his trainer ever since. After taking a hiatus the following year, he resumed his career, diving his amateur career between the United States and Puerto Rico. Santiago compiled a record of 184–12, participating in the 2009-10 Ringside World Championships and the World Amateur Boxing Championship.

== Professional career ==
In 2013, AIBA revised its rules by eliminating protective gear and decided to raise the age limit for participants in the elite category to 19 years old, leaving the 17-year-old Santiago with the only option of participating in junior tournaments or risking injury by fighting without headgear under the new rules. Having already competed in nearly 200 amateur fights, he decided to begin a professional career. However, his residence complicated this move, because the Pennsylvania State Athletic Commission does not allow anyone under the age of 18 to turn professional. After taking under consideration the circumstances and reviewing his amateur performance, the entity made an exemption and granted Santiago a license, making him the youngest professional boxer in the history of the state. He headlined his first event, defeating Moses Molina by knockout in the first round. Santiago repeated this performance two weeks later in a win over Christian Daniels. His next fight was against William Lorenzo, concluding in his first unanimous decision win. On April 5, 2014, Santiago made his professional debut in Puerto Rico, knocking Luis Ortiz Medina by knockout in the first round. His next fight against Josh Beeman marked the first time that he competed in a six-round fight. During this timeframe, Santiago was signed by adviser Al Haymon. The following month, he defeated Josh Beeman by unanimous decision in his first six-round fight. On June 19, 2014, Santiago returned to Puerto Rico and outscored Carlos López in the undercard of a McWilliams Arroyo card.
