= John Roan (reverend) =

Jonn Roan (1716–1775) was Presbyterian reverend, born in Ireland, about the year 1716, working as a weaver in his younger years who emigrated to the American colonies with his family. As a young man he studied theology at the Log College. Thereafter Roan was licensed to preach by the “ New Side” Presbytery of Newcastle. and settled New Side ccongregations of Paxton, Derry and Conewago.

The inscription on Roan's tombstone reads: "Here lies the remains of an able, faithful, courageous and successful minister of Christ."

== Sources ==
- Murphy, Thomas (1889). The Presbytery of the log college. Philadelphia: Presbyterian Board of Publication and Sabbath-School Work.
- Nevin, Alfred (1884). Encyclopaedia of the Presbyterian church in the United States of America. Philadelphia: Presbyterian encyclopædia publishing co.
- Sprague, William (1858). Annals of the American Pulpit 1858. Vol. 3. New York: Robert Carter & Brothers. pp. 154–165.
