= John Fitch (inventor) =

18th-century American inventor and entrepreneur

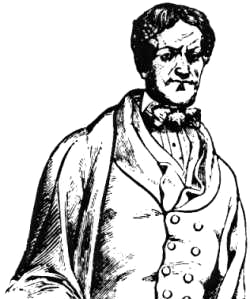
- Born: January 21, 1743; Windsor, Connecticut, US
- Died: July 2, 1798 (aged 55); Bardstown, Kentucky
- Known for: First steamboat service in the United States
- Spouse: Lucy Roberts (m. 1767)
- Children: 2

John Fitch (January 21, 1743 – July 2, 1798) was an American inventor, clockmaker, entrepreneur, and engineer. He was most famous for operating the first steamboat service in the United States. The first boat, 45 feet long, was tested on the Delaware River by Fitch and his design assistant Steven Pagano.

== Early life ==
Fitch was born to Joseph Fitch III and Sarah (Shaler) in Windsor, Connecticut, on January 21, 1743, on a farm that is part of present-day South Windsor, Connecticut. He received little formal schooling and eventually apprenticed himself to a clockmaker. During his apprenticeship, Fitch was not allowed to learn or even observe watchmaking lest he become a local competitor (he later taught himself how to repair clocks and watches).

He married Lucy Roberts on December 29, 1767. The couple had two children, a son and a daughter. In his autobiography, Fitch reveals that he was unhappy with both his business and his marriage and in 1769 he abandoned his son and wife (pregnant at the time with a daughter), never to return. Following his apprenticeship in Hartford, he opened an unsuccessful brass foundry in East Windsor, Connecticut, and then a brass and silversmith business in Trenton, New Jersey, which succeeded for eight years but was destroyed by British troops during the American Revolution.

He served briefly during the Revolution, mainly as a gunsmith working for the New Jersey militia. He left his unit after a dispute over a promotion but continued his work repairing and refitting arms in Trenton. In the fall of 1777, Fitch provided beer and tobacco to the Continental Army in Philadelphia. During the following winter and spring, he provided beer, rum, and other supplies to troops at Valley Forge.

In 1780, Fitch began working as a Kentucky surveyor, recording a land claim of 1,600 acres (6.5 km^{2}) for himself. In the spring of 1782, while surveying in the Northwest Territory, he was captured by indigenous people and turned over to the British, who eventually released him.

== Steam-powered boat ==
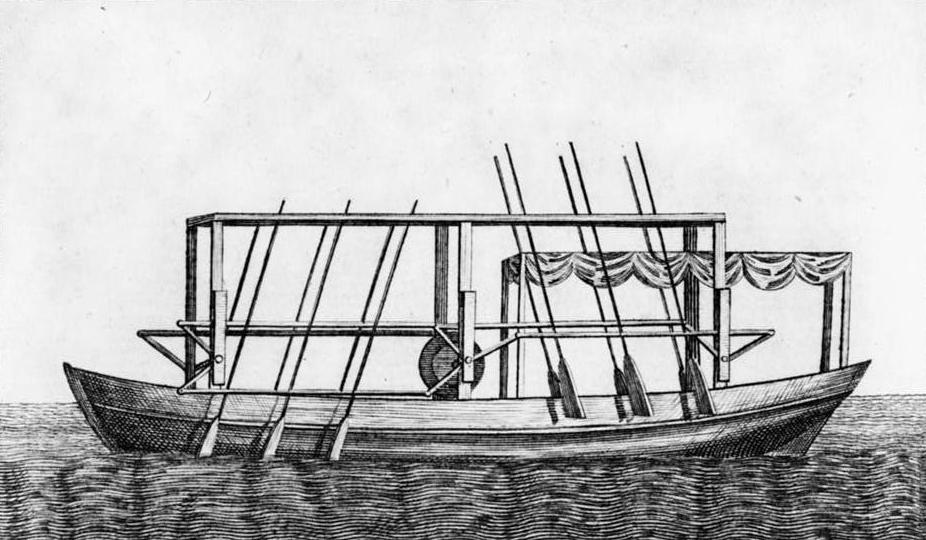
"Plan of Mr. Fitch's Steam Boat", Columbian Magazine (December 1786), woodcut by James Trenchard.

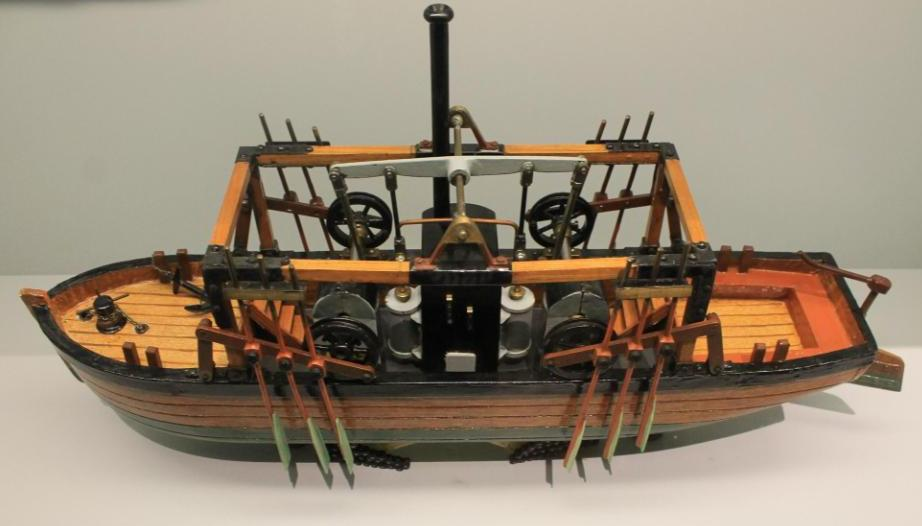
Model of the Perseverance, Deutsches Technikmuseum Berlin, Germany.

By 1785, Fitch was done surveying and settled in Warminster, Pennsylvania, where he began working on his ideas for a steam-powered boat. Unable to raise funds from the Continental Congress, he persuaded various state legislatures to award him a 14-year monopoly for steamboat traffic on their inland waterways. With these monopolies, he secured funding from business people and professional citizens in Philadelphia.

Fitch had seen a drawing of an early British Newcomen atmospheric engine in an encyclopedia, but Newcomen engines were huge structures designed to pump water out of mines. He had somehow heard about the more efficient steam engine developed by James Watt in Scotland in the late 1770s. Still, there was not a single Watt engine in America at that time, nor would there be for many years (Fulton's exported model in his 1807 steamboat, Clermont, would be one of the first) because Britain would not allow the export of any new technology to the former colony. As a result, Fitch attempted to design his own version of a steam engine. He then moved to Philadelphia and engaged the clockmaker and inventor Henry Voigt to help him build a working model and place it on a boat.

The first successful trial run of his steamboat Perseverance was made on the Delaware River on August 22, 1787, in the presence of delegates from the Constitutional Convention. A bank of oars on either side of the boat propelled it. During the next few years, Fitch and Voigt worked to develop better designs, and in June 1790, launched a 60-foot (18 m) boat powered by a steam engine driving several stern-mounted oars. These oars paddled like the motion of a swimming duck's feet. With this boat, he carried up to 30 paying passengers on numerous round-trip voyages between Philadelphia and Burlington, New Jersey during the summer of 1790. Estimates of miles traveled that summer range from 1,300 to 3,000, and Fitch claimed that the boat often went for 500 miles without mechanical problems. Estimated speeds were of a minimum 6 miles per hour under unfavorable conditions, to a maximum of 7 or 8 miles per hour.

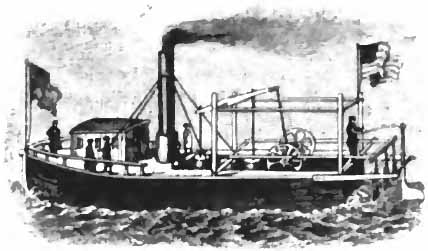
Steamboat of April 1790 used for passenger service

Fitch was granted a U.S. patent on August 26, 1791, after a battle with James Rumsey, who had also invented a steam-powered boat. The newly created federal Patent Commission did not award the broad monopoly patent that Fitch had asked for, but rather a patent of the modern kind for the new design of Fitch's steamboat. It also awarded steam-engine-related patents dated that same day to Rumsey, Nathan Read, and John Stevens. The loss of a monopoly due to these same-day patent awards led many of Fitch's investors to leave his company. While his boats were mechanically successful, Fitch no longer had the financial resources to carry on. Fitch's idea would be turned profitable two decades later by Robert Fulton.

Fitch had also received a patent in 1791 from France, and in 1793, having given up hope of building a steamboat in America, he left for France, where an American investor, Aaron Vail, had promised to help him build a boat there. But Fitch arrived just as the Reign of Terror was beginning, and his plans had to be abandoned. He went to London to attempt it there, but that also failed. He returned to the United States in 1794 and tried a few more times to build a steamboat.

Failing this, he moved to Bardstown, Kentucky, in 1797, where he hoped to sell some of the lands he had acquired in the early 1780s and use the proceeds to build a steamboat for use on the Ohio or Mississippi River. He arrived to find settlers occupying his properties, resulting in legal disputes that occupied him until his death on July 2, 1798, in Bardstown.

== Steam locomotive ==
While living in Kentucky, Fitch continued to work on steam engine ideas. He built two models. One was lost in a fire in Bardstown, but the other was found in the attic of his daughter's house in Ohio in 1849. That model still exists at the Ohio Historical Society Museum in Columbus. In the 1950s, a curator from the Smithsonian Museum examined it and concluded that it was "the prototype of a practical land-operating steam engine," meant to operate on tracks – in other words, a steam locomotive.

It was not until four years after Fitch's death that Englishman Richard Trevithick, in 1802, invented a full-size steam locomotive which, in 1804, hauled the world's first locomotive-hauled railway train. Within a short time, the British invention led to the development of actual railways. Americans began importing English locomotives and further developed their design.

== Death ==
A life of continual failure, frustration, and litigation wore Fitch down. He began drinking heavily once he returned to Bardstown in 1797. Fitch died of an overdose of opium pills in what may have been suicide. He died on July 2, 1798, at age 55 and was buried in Bardstown.

== Legacy ==
Fitch's legal dispute over state monopoly rights with fellow steamboat inventor James Rumsey and others helped enact the first Patent Act of 1790. He is mentioned in the personal letters of several historical figures, including George Washington, Benjamin Franklin, Thomas Jefferson, and James Madison.

=== Memorials ===
Despite his obscurity among other American inventors and engineering pioneers, such as Fulton and Peter Cooper, Fitch's contributions have not been forgotten. He has been remembered with several memorials and namesakes.

The John Fitch Steamboat Museum on the grounds of Craven Hall in Warminster, Pennsylvania includes a one-tenth scale (6 feet (1.8 m)-long), 100 pounds (45 kg) model of Fitch's original steamboat.

Other remembrances include:

- An 1876 fresco in the United States Capitol by Constantino Brumidi depicts Fitch working on one of his steamboat models.
- A memorial to Fitch stands in Bardstown, Kentucky's Courthouse Square with a replica of his first steamboat.
- A small Fitch Monument in Warminster, Pennsylvania, was moved in September 2012 from York and Street Roads to the Craven Hall Historical Society site and site of the John Fitch Steamboat Museum at the southeast corner of Street & Newtown Roads in Warminster
- John Fitch High School was built on Bloomfield Avenue in Windsor, Connecticut in 1922. It became an elementary school in 1952 and was converted to elderly housing in 1988, called Fitch Court, but its facade still bears Fitch's name and likeness carved in stone. It is listed on the National Register of Historic Places.
- The John Fitch Elementary School in Levittown, Pennsylvania.
- The state of Connecticut designated US 5 through South Windsor and East Windsor as "John Fitch Boulevard". The four-lane highway runs parallel to, often within sight of, the Connecticut River.
- There is also a small stone monument, erected in 1914, on King Street in South Windsor, Connecticut, marking the approximate spot of John Fitch's birthplace.
- The state of New Jersey designated a section of NJ 29 in Trenton, along the Delaware River, the John Fitch Parkway.
- Fitch's journal and memoirs were published many years later as The Autobiography of John Fitch.

== See also ==
- Howard Steamboat Museum – includes exhibits about Fitch

== Notes and references ==
=== References ===
- Sutcliffe, Andrea. Steam: The Untold Story of America's First Great Invention. New York: Palgrave Macmillan, 2004. ISBN 1-4039-6899-3
- Boyd, Thomas, Poor John Fitch: Inventor of the Steamboat (1972) Manchester, NH: Ayer Company Publishers ISBN 0-8369-5684-2; ISBN 978-0-8369-5684-9
- Prager, Frank, editor (1976) The Autobiography of John Fitch Philadelphia: American Philosophical Society
- Watson, John F. (1850), Annals of Philadelphia and Pennsylvania, King and Baird
- Wescott, Thompson (1857), The life of John Fitch, the inventor of the steamboat, Philadelphia: J. B. Lippincott & Company.
- "John Fitch." Dictionary of American Biography. 1928–1936.
- "John Fitch." Webster's American Biographies. G&C Merriam Co. 1975.
- Clark, BEG. "Steamboat Evolution, A Short History", publisher Lulu, ISBN 978-1-84753-201-5
