= Log College =

First seminary serving Presbyterians in North America

Coordinates: 40.214869°N 75.099343°W

Log College

The Log College, founded in 1727, was the first theological seminary serving Presbyterians in North America, and was located in what is now Warminster, Pennsylvania. It was founded by William Tennent and operated from 1727 until Tennent's death in 1746, and it graduated proponents on the New Side of the significant Old Side–New Side Controversy that divided presbyterianism in colonial America at the time. The Log College was, as a physical structure, very plain, according to George Whitefield's journal; it was a private institution that had no charter. At that time, ministers could not get ordained unless they had graduated from Harvard, Yale, or a college in England. Thus, an important purpose in its founding was to support the spread of New Light Christianity by enabling proponents to become ordained. In sources dated through the early 20th century, it was referred to as a remarkable institution, with graduates including Samuel Finley, John Redman, and John Rowland. Though the number of eventual graduates is unknown (perhaps being 20 or fewer), many would play important roles in the Old Side–New Side Controversy, and Log College alumni Samuel Blair, Samuel Finley, and William Tennent, Jr. would become trustees of a newly formed College of New Jersey (the Rev. Jonathan Dickinson obtained the charter for the new institution in 1746 to carry on the ideals of William Tennent), which would be renamed Princeton University in 1896.

== Founding ==
The College was "organized at the Forks of the Neshaminy in Bucks County, Pennsylvania, by the Reverend William Tennent to which on its removal to land given him on the York Road near Hartsville in the same county" and "the name 'Log College' was scoffingly given." The location is in what is now Warminster, Pennsylvania. It was founded in 1727, and operated until William Tennent's death in 1745. The physical structure of the Log College was about 20 feet long and 20 feet wide—and very plain according to George Whitefield's journal.

== Reception ==
In the context of the Old Side–New Side Controversy that would emerge in colonial Presbyterianism as part of the First Great Awakening, Log College graduates were adherents of the New Side position that emphasized spontaneity and experiential devotion in contrast to the Old Side position that affirmed ritual and dogma. In 1739 the Presbyterian Synod of Philadelphia, at that time the only Presbyterian Synod in North America, passed a rule prohibiting ministers from American colleges or seminaries, except for those from Harvard or Yale, in effect banning the Log College's graduates. This rule led to pressure to charter new colleges, and eventually led to the formation of the College of New Jersey, the antecedent of Princeton University; Log College alumni Samuel Blair, Samuel Finley, Gilbert Tennent, and William Tennent, Jr. would become among the first trustees of a newly formed College of New Jersey, and Finley a later president. In historical treatments on the origin of Princeton University, the Log College is referred to as a "remarkable institution," and Archibald Alexander, the Presbyterian theologian and professor at the Princeton Theological Seminary, would go on to publish "Biographical Sketches of the Founder, and Principal Alumni: Together with an Account of the Revivals of Religion, Under Their Ministries" in a book about the "Log College."

== Graduates ==
Known graduates of the Log College include Charles Beatty, John Blair, Samuel Blair, Samuel Finley, John Redman, William Robinson, Charles Tennent, John Tennent, and William Tennent Jr., John Rowland, Hamilton Bell, William Robinson, Charles Beatty, James McCrea, John Campbell, John Roan, William Dean, Daniel Lawrence, David Alexander. The number of graduates of the Log College is unknown, but is thought to have been about 18 or 20, most of whom were adherents of the New Side in the Old Side-New Side Controversy. John Redman was the only known graduate not to enter the ministry, choosing instead to enter the field of medicine. Graduate Hamilton Bell conformed to the Church of England in 1748 and became a priest in Somerset Parish, Maryland.

== Relationship to the College of New Jersey (Princeton) ==
There are many connections between the Log College and the College of New Jersey, which would become Princeton University in 1896, but it is not accurate to say that the Log College was its direct antecedent. From its inception, under the guidance of the Reverend Jonathan Dickinson, a Presbyterian, the College of New Jersey focused on a broad range of the liberal arts and sciences, in contrast to the Log College's explicit preparation for the ministry. A closer connection has often been proposed, perhaps in an effort to claim an earlier founding date for Princeton. However, soon after the College of New Jersey was founded, a number of Log College men joined their New Side brethren from Yale and Harvard in support of the new venture. The first trustees, including five Log College adherents enlisted by Dickinson and Pemberton, announced Dickinson's appointment as the first President of Princeton University in April 1747. Six months after the granting of the College of New Jersey's charter in October 1746, and shortly before classes started in May 1747, Log College alumni Samuel Blair, Samuel Finley, and William Tennent, Jr., along with adherents Gilbert Tennent and Richard Treat Paine, accepted election as trustees of the new College. Finley later became its fifth president.
