= V. La Rosa and Sons Macaroni Company =

American pasta manufacturer

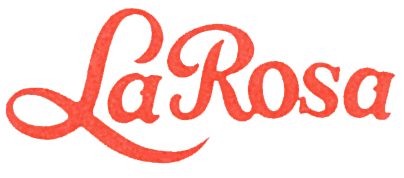
- Industry: Food Manufacturing
- Founded: 1914; 112 years ago
- Founder: Vincenzo La Rosa
- Successor: Peter La Rosa
- Headquarters: Warminster, Pennsylvania, United States
- Products: Pasta

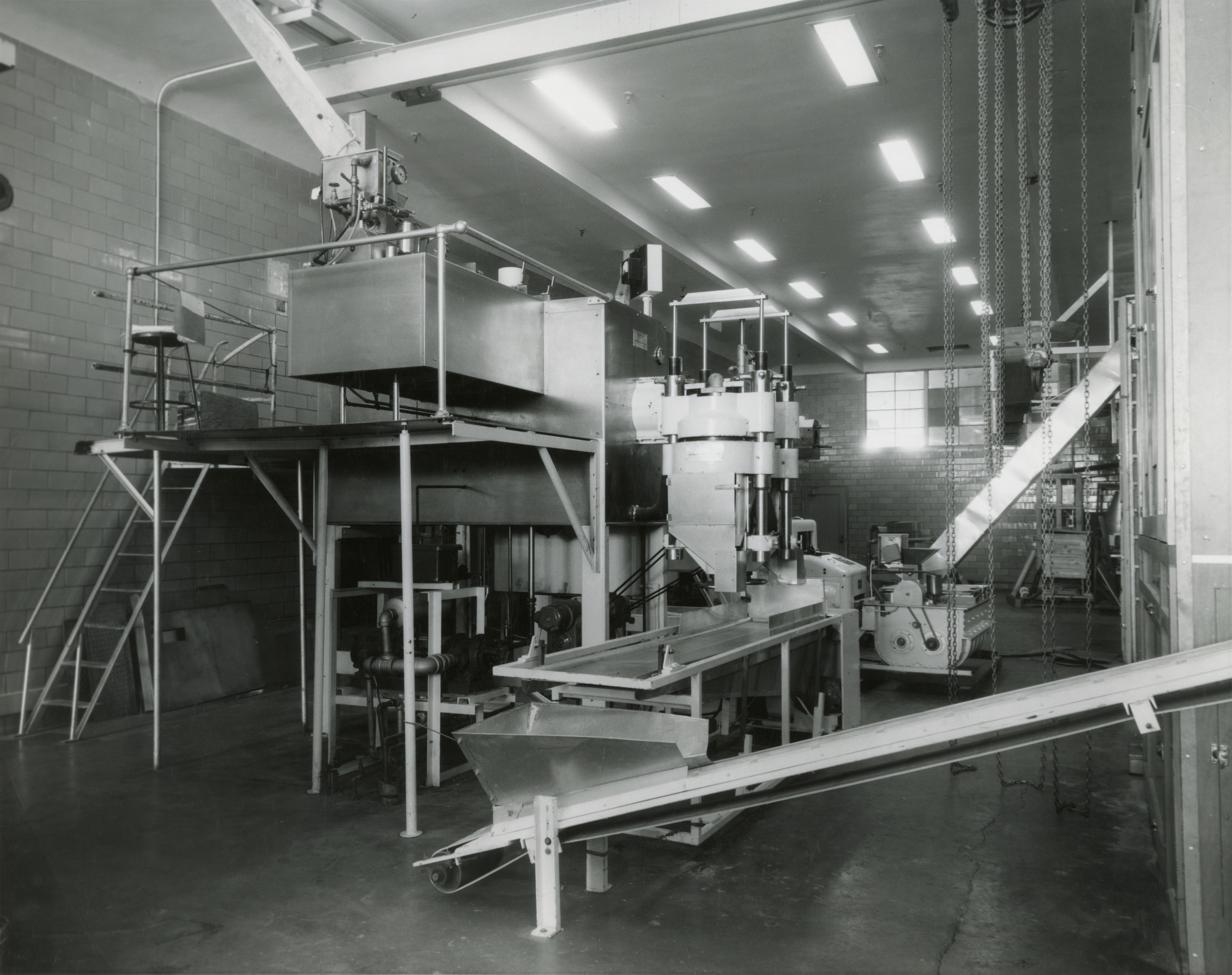
Pasta extruder at the Warminster, Pennsylvania, factory

V. La Rosa and Sons Macaroni Company was founded in 1914 by Vincenzo La Rosa, a Sicilian immigrant. The company eventually became one of the largest regional brands in the United States producing over 40 varieties of pasta.

Vincenzo La Rosa, the founder of the company, was succeeded in business by his son, Pietro (Peter) La Rosa, who expanded the brand during the mid-20th century. It was a family owned business, selling primarily in retail markets.

The company was later sold to Borden, Inc., becoming part of a larger portfolio of American food brands, including Creamette and Catelli. Despite the sale, the La Rosa name remained synonymous with Italian-American heritage and pasta innovation for decades.

== History ==
Starting in the United States as a butcher, Vincenzo noticed an increased demand for macaroni during World War I, so he started making it in the back of his shop in the Williamsburg neighborhood of Brooklyn, New York. The company opened a pasta factory at 473 Kent Avenue in Brooklyn using an extruder made by I. DeFrancisci & Son, now called DEMACO. As the company grew, additional plants were added at 40 Jacksonville Road, Warminster Township, Pennsylvania, and 90 Wauregan Road, Danielson, Connecticut.

Vincenzo La Rosa was considered an innovator in the development of the packaged foods industry in the United States as he was an early pioneer in food packaging and distribution. Prior to V. La Rosa, pasta was distributed in bulk throughout the neighborhoods of New York. V. La Rosa introduced packaged pasta into these markets.

American Italian Pasta Company eventually acquired the La Rosa brand.

=== Tharinger Macaroni Company ===
In 1959, La Rosa purchased Tharinger Macaroni Company, makers of White Pearl brand, and acquired their factory at 3372 North Holton Street, Milwaukee, Wisconsin. Tharinger started about 1916. The White Pearl brand was trademarked in the US in 1924 by Tharinger, but was started about 1869.

Tharinger was the successor to Lorenz Bros Macaroni Company, the original makers of White Pearl brand.
