= William Tennent III =

18th century American minister

Personal life
- Born: 1740 Freehold Township, New Jersey
- Died: August 11, 1777 (aged 36–37) High Hills of Santee, South Carolina
- Resting place: Unitarian Church in Charleston cemetery
- Parent: William Tennent, Jr. (father)
- Education: College of New Jersey; Harvard University
- Known for: Religious liberty, supporting the American revolution

Religious life
- Religion: Presbyterian
- Church: The Meeting House (independent), now the Circular Congregational Church

William Tennent III (1740 – August 11, 1777) was a Presbyterian pastor and South Carolina politician. He was born and educated in northern Colonial America, but spent the latter part of his life in the southern state of South Carolina. He was a prominent advocate for the dis-establishment of any state religion. He is known for his opposition to British colonial policy, publishing patriotic essays in support of the revolution. He was selected to travel in 1775 into the "back county" of South Carolina to convert Loyalists to the cause. In the state assembly, he lobbied for religious liberty in the drafting of state constitutions.

== Background ==
William Tennent III was born in Freehold, New Jersey, the son of William Tennent, Jr. and grandson of William Tennent. He graduated from the College of New Jersey (later Princeton University) in 1758, and earned a master's degree from Harvard University in 1763. He was licensed to preach (1761–62) and then ordained (1762–63) by the Presbytery of New Brunswick.

He preached for about six months in Hanover, Virginia, and then in Norwalk, Connecticut, at the Congregational Church where he was assistant minister. He remained in Norwalk for over six years. He declined an invitation to preach in Boston and instead moved to Charleston, South Carolina. From 1772 until his death in 1777, he was the pastor of The Meeting House in Charleston, which in colonial times was unnamed and known as either the Independent, Congregational, or Presbyterian Church. He was not succeeded until the conclusion of the Revolutionary War in 1783, and during the time the British held Charleston, they used the building as a storehouse. The church evolved to become the present Circular Congregational Church.

== Religious equality ==
Tennent was an advocate for religious equality in South Carolina, which at the time had an established Anglican state religion. An interdenominational meeting chose Tennent on April 27, 1776, as their representative in the assembly to lobby for religious freedom in the new state constitution. The 1776 constitution, while renouncing the Church of England, kept South Carolina Anglican. Tennent addressed the South Carolina General Assembly on January 11, 1777, "praying for a Constitutional Recognition of the Equal Rights of all Religious Denominations". He demanded an end to any state-established religion, and the financial support given to establishment churches by the government. He supported the constitution, adopted in 1778, that moved in that direction by establishing a state religion of Christianity affording equality to all Christian denominations.

== Political ==
Tennent was a Whig (or Patriot) and opposed British colonial policy after 1773. He was a member of the South Carolina General Assembly, then known as the provincial Congress, that functioned as the colony's rebel government, and authored political speeches. He continued as pastor, but successfully segregated his political beliefs in support of the revolution from his preachings, although he strongly believed in both religious and civil liberty.

=== Revolution ===
Tennent published essays in support of the Patriot cause after the passage of the Tea Act and the subsequent Intolerable Acts. His efforts to stimulate Patriotism made him known as the "Firebrand Parson".

Tennent was first elected to the Assembly in 1774 and authored an anti-British jeremiad entitled An Address, Occasioned by the Late Invasion of the Liberties of the American Colonists by the British Parliament.

In 1775, Tennent and Oliver Hart, a Baptist, were sent by South Carolina's Committee of Safety to the rural areas of South Carolina to counter the Loyalist movement and encourage settlers there to support the Patriot side. The mission was conceived by Colonel William Thomson, a provincial ranger commander. The goal was to explain the reasons for the rebellion and gain the allegiance of their leaders and militia. The mission was led by rebel William Henry Drayton. They were to be assisted by Colonel Richard Richardson and Joseph Kershaw.

The Committee selected Tennent for the mission because, as grandson of William Tennent, he was influential and respected, and was highly educated with two master's degrees. Furthermore, as a Presbyterian, he would be influential in the rural areas where many of the citizens there were also Presbyterian.

Tennent and Drayton arrived at a trading post near Granby on the Congaree River in Orangeburg County in early August 1775, after traveling 130 mi (210 km). Tennent conducted a religious service for a company of dissatisfied militia-men there. Tennent then proceeded to travel north across the Broad River towards Rocky Creek, preaching to Scotch-Irish who were believed to be ready to join the Patriot cause. Tennent's patriotic speeches succeeded in getting more men to form militia companies loyal to the provincial congress. In one three-day period, he enlisted over four hundred men.

In July 1776, Tennent was on a mission to North Carolina to try to convert some Tories there to switch sides. A companion on the trip, Francis Salvador, the first Georgian Patriot to die in the revolution, was ambushed, shot, and scalped by the Loyalists.

== Personal life ==
In 1764, Tennent married Susan Vergereau. They had five children, including John Charles Tennent (born 1774), Charles, William Peter Tennent (died 1816), and two others. Tennent died August 11, 1777, at High Hills of the Santee near Stateburg in Sumter County after developing a fever; he had returned from New Jersey where he had gone to accompany his mother, recently widowed, back to South Carolina. A historical marker was erected near there on Highway 261 that reads:

Third Presbyterian preacher of this name, Tennent died several miles south in 1777. He was born in 1740 of a renowned family of ministers and educators. From 1772 he served as pastor of the Independent Church of Charleston. As a Patriot, he prepared the up country for the Revolution and advocated the dissenters' appeal for equality in religious rights.

He is buried in the cemetery of the Unitarian Church in Charleston, which is located a short distance from the Meeting House and was formed by the Society of Dissenters who needed more space and built a second building to complement the Meeting House.

A commemorative inscription there reads:

In Memory Of the Rev William Tennent A.M. Pastor of this church; (And principally instrumental in the Erection of this building. Dedicated to the worship of Almighty God;) Who died at the High hills of Santee Aug 11th 1777; In the 37th year of his age. He was distinguished for quickness of perception and solidity of judgement; for energy and firmness of mind; for inflexible patriotism and for ardent public spirit; For sincere and zealous piety, for the boldness with which he enforced the claims of the Deity and vindicated the rights of man. As a preacher he was prompt, solemn, instructive, and persuasive of every social virtue he was a bright example.
