= Craven Hall =

Historic house in Pennsylvania, United States

- U.S. National Register of Historic Places
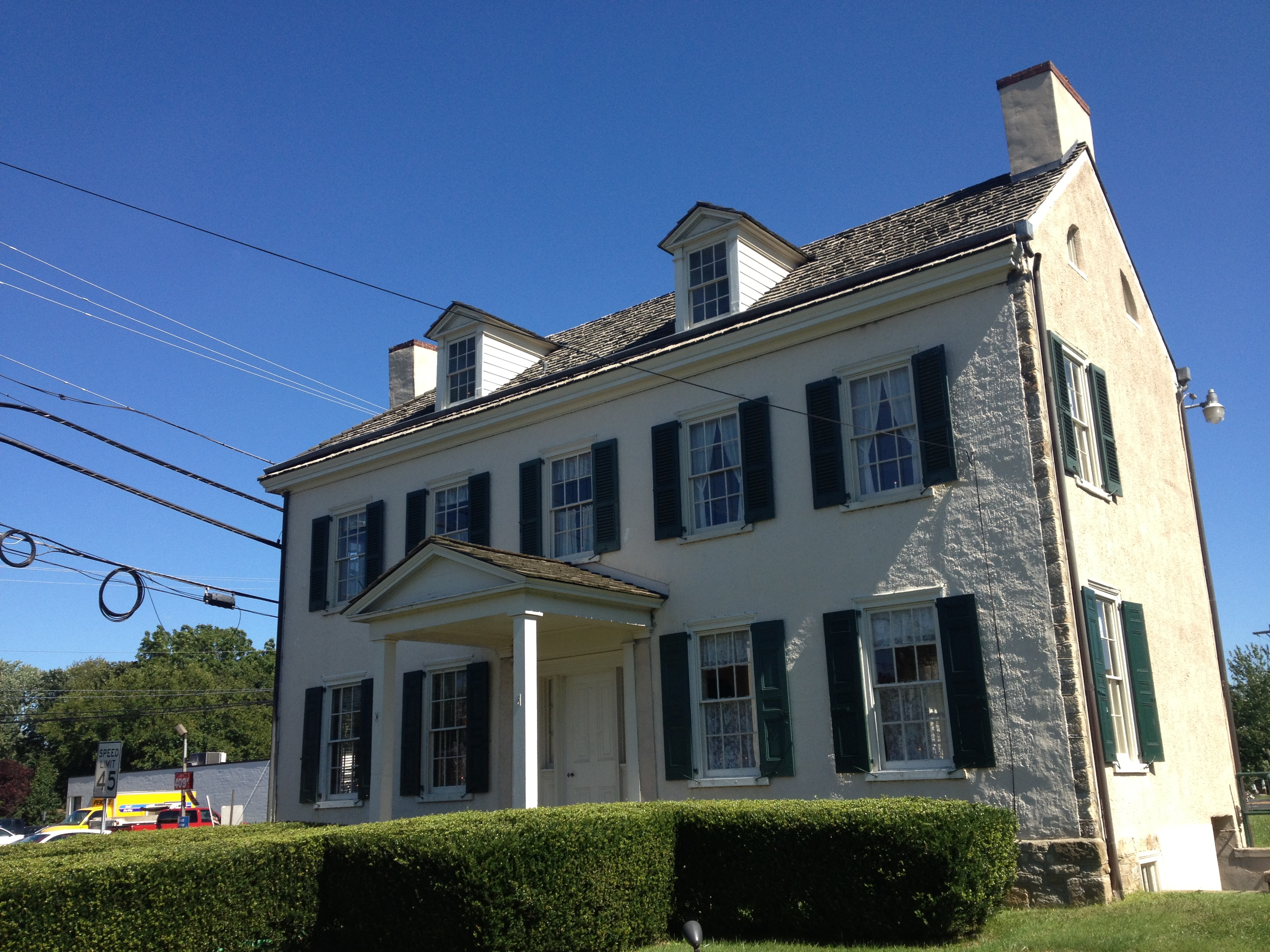
- Craven Hall in 2013

- Location within Pennsylvania Location within the United States
- Location: 599 Newtown Road, Warminster, Pennsylvania
- Coordinates: 40°11′29″N 75°4′26″W
- Built: 1780, 1823
- Architectural style: Greek Revival
- NRHP reference No.: 07001078
- Added to NRHP: October 11, 2007

Craven Hall is a historic building located in Warminster Township, Pennsylvania, at the corner of Newtown Road and East Street Road (Route 132), a five-lane arterial road which runs through the central commercial district. The house was originally built in 1780, with subsequent work in 1823 and a single story addition in the 20th century.

== Significance ==
The building is a good example of attempts to adapt the high style of Philadelphia architecture to buildings in a rural setting. The Greek Revival detailing of the exterior, and the interior details of the window and door frames and the mantelpiece, along with its sensitivity to proportion, make it unique to rural southeastern Pennsylvania.

The John Fitch Steamboat Museum is located at this site, which includes a working model of the commercial steamboat that Fitch operated on the Delaware River in 1790.

== History ==
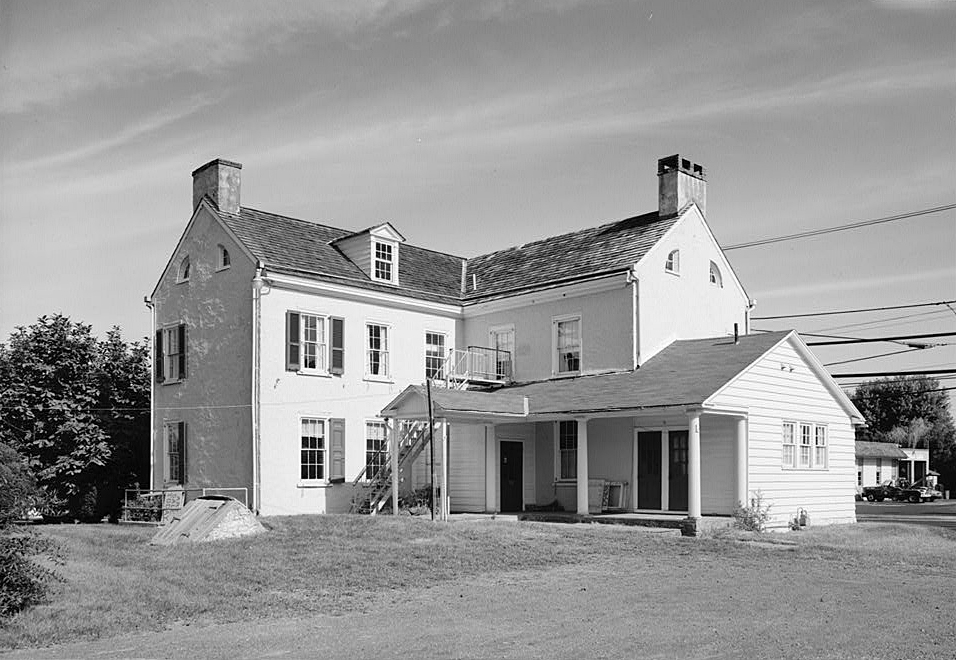
Rear elevation

Craven Hall is associated with families that were part of the American Revolution and prominent in local Pennsylvania history. The house was built for John Craven who was the founder of Johnsville, Pennsylvania. Later, the house passed down to members of the VanSant, Longstreth, Hart and Bennett families.

== Construction ==
The house is two and a half stories, built with stone walls finished with stucco. The central hallway and staircase are flanked by parlor rooms on either side. A side wing built to the same height as the main building has quarter-round windows on each side of the chimney. The building retains the original fireplaces and the kitchen hearth.

The spring house in the rear yard is built underground with stone and stucco walls, and accessed by a staircase.
