= William Tennent =

Religious leader and educator in early America

William Tennent by unknown artist

William Tennent (1673 – May 6, 1746) was an early Scottish American Presbyterian minister and educator in British North America. Tennent established what came to be known as the famous Log College.

== Early life ==
Tennent was born in Mid Calder, Linlithgowshire, Scotland, in 1673. He graduated from the University of Edinburgh in 1695 and was ordained probably in the Church of Scotland in 1706. He moved to Ulster as chaplain to the Hamiltons, who had considerable land and influence and worshipped in Vinecash Presbyterian Church, Co Armagh where a "blue plaque" to commemorate him was unveiled in 2025. He migrated to the Thirteen Colonies in 1718, arriving in the colony of Pennsylvania at the urging of his wife's cousin James Logan, a Scots-Irish Quaker and close friend of William Penn. In 1726 he was called to a pastorate at the Neshaminy-Warwick Presbyterian Church in present-day Warminster, where he stayed for the remainder of his life.

== The Log College ==
In 1727 Tennent established a religious school in a log cabin that became famous as the Log College. He filled his pupils with evangelical zeal, and a number became revivalist preachers in the First Great Awakening. The educational influence of the Log College was of importance since many of its graduates founded schools along the frontier. Princeton University is regarded as the successor to the Log College.

The name Log College had a negative connotation at the time, as it was a derisive nickname attached to the school by ministers educated in Europe. They chided Tennent for trying to educate poor farm boys considered by some to be unsuitable for the ministry.

Tennent's sons Gilbert (1703-1764) and William, Jr. were also noted early American clergymen. Rev. William Tennent, Jr. was the Presbyterian pastor of the Freehold, New Jersey congregation. A grandson, also the Rev. William Tennent, was known in church history as William Tennent the Third.

== Old Tennent Church ==
The current edifice of the Old Tennent Church in Tennent, New Jersey, completed 1751–53, was named in memory of pastors William Tennent and his brother John Tennent.

== Death ==
Tennent died in Warminster in 1746, and his gravesite can still be found today in the church cemetery of the Neshaminy-Warwick Presbyterian Church. Tennent's last will and testament is on record at the Bucks County Court House. It indicates that by the time he died he was still a humble servant of God, leaving what little he had to his wife Catherine (née Kennedy) Tennent. Tennent, as well as his sons Gilbert Tennent and William Tennent, Jr., were slaveholders.

== Legacy ==
At least one school, William Tennent High School (located close to the location of the Log College) is named for Tennent. In addition, there is a Log College Middle School named in honor of the original Log College, about .25 miles (0.40 km) from the original building's location. Both are public schools within the Centennial School District in Bucks County, Pennsylvania, specifically Warminster, PA.

Inspired by the model of theological education begun by Tennent and beginning in 2020, the William Tennent School of Theology was launched in Woodland Park, Colorado. The school currently offers five postgraduate degree programs, including the Master of Arts in Theological Studies, the Master of Letters, and the Master of Divinity.

== Archival collections ==
The Presbyterian Historical Society in Philadelphia, Pennsylvania, has a collection of Rev. Tennent's original sermons and notes.

== Sources ==
- Starr, Harris Elwood. "Tennent, William". Dictionary of American Biography. Vol. XVIII. New York: Charles Scribner's Sons. pp. 369–370.
