= Southampton Baptist Church and Cemetery =

Historic site in Bucks County, Pennsylvania, US

- U.S. National Register of Historic Places
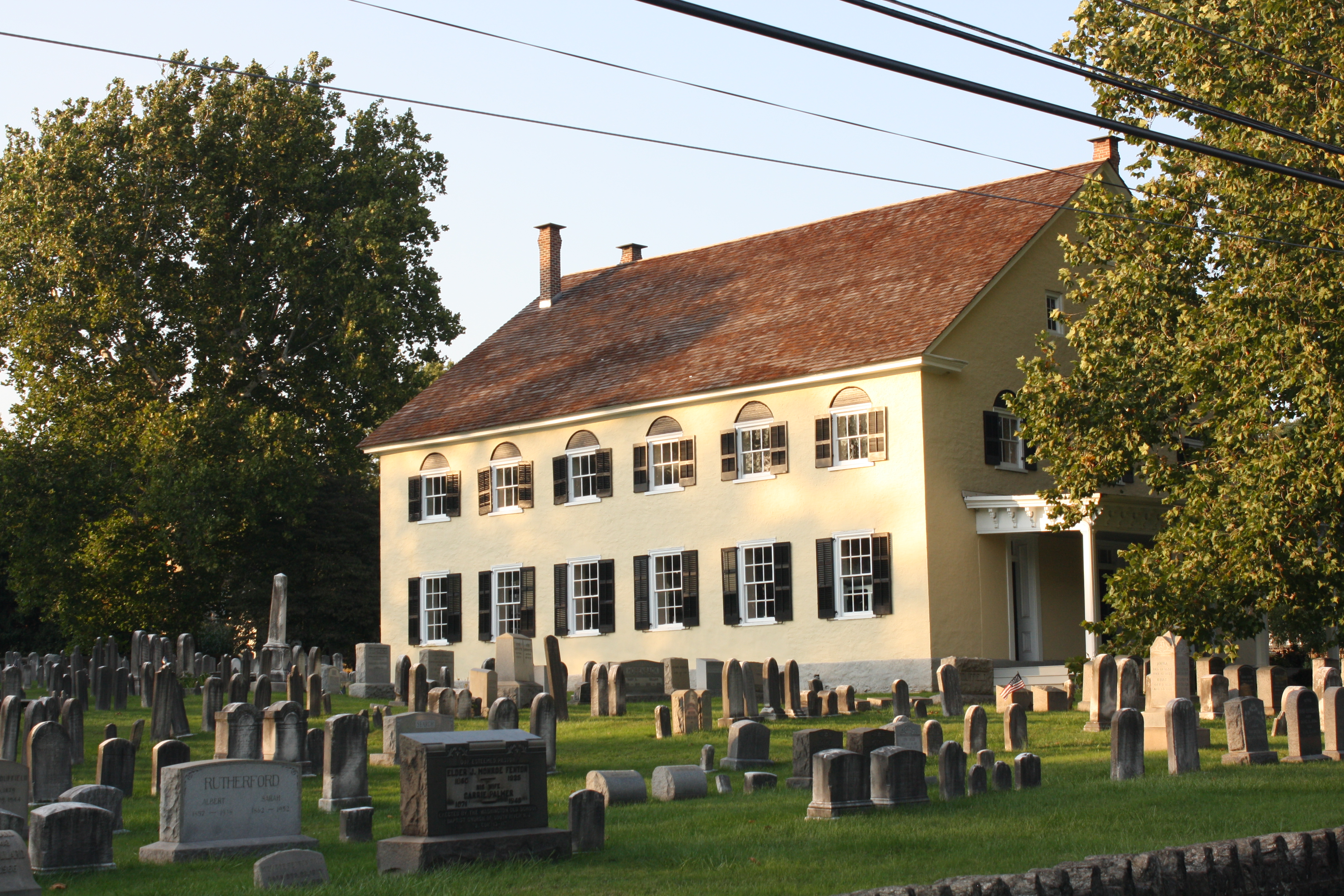
- Southampton Baptist Church and Cemetery, September 2012

- Location within Pennsylvania Location within the United States
- Location: 2nd St. Pike and Maple Ave., Southampton, Pennsylvania
- Coordinates: 40°11′02″N 75°02′05″W
- Built: 1772-1814
- NRHP reference No.: 78002359
- Added to NRHP: September 18, 1978

Southampton Baptist Church and Cemetery is a historic Baptist church and cemetery in Southampton, Bucks County, Pennsylvania. It was built in 1772, and substantially enlarged in 1814. It is a two-story, stuccoed stone meeting house style building with a steep gable roof. The property includes the church cemetery, which has burials for 24 veterans of the American Revolution.

It was added to the National Register of Historic Places in 1978.
