= Havis, Inc. =

- Formerly: Havis-Shields
- Company type: Private
- Industry: Automotive, Public Safety
- Founder: Dan Havis and Jim Shields
- Headquarters: Warminster, Pennsylvania, United States
- Area served: Worldwide
- Number of employees: 300+
- Website: https://customers.havis.com/

Havis, Inc., is an American manufacturer of in-vehicle mobile office and prisoner transport products for private and public corporate, military and law enforcement, and enterprise fleets. Founded in Philadelphia and now headquartered in Warminster, Pennsylvania, Havis serves numerous industries, including but not limited to public safety, military and government, utility and public works, energy services, transportation, material handling, and other mobile professions. Along with its factory in Warminster, Havis also operates a satellite office in Plymouth, Michigan.

== History ==
Havis began in 1928 as Havis-Shields Equipment Corporation, named for founders Dan Havis and Jim Shields. Havis-Shields supplied heavy-duty automotive and electrical equipment to police departments and other areas of the public sector.

By the early 1980s, the company had branched into manufacturing, selling high-intensity scene lighting to the public safety sector. In 2009, the company announced a merger with LEDCO-ChargeGuard. Havis-Shields was renamed Havis, Inc.

In 2011, Havis announced the sale of its Lighting Solutions product line of Kwik-Raze, Magnafire, Collins Dynamics, and Quester to R-O-M Corporation in order to focus more on its current product lines of docking stations, prisoner and K9 transport, and integrated control systems.

In 2014, Havis acquired longtime partner Schlotter Precision Products--a manufacturer of plastic parts and molds--and formed Havis Molding.

Havis has been at its Warminster headquarters since 2002; an on-site expansion was completed in summer 2016.

== Corporate overview ==
Havis is led by CEO Joe Bernert, his team of executive directors, and a number of small teams that focus on marketing, customer service, engineering, ISO certification, and other fields. Havis employs more than 300 workers who build and install company products.

== Markets served ==
Havis, Inc. serves several different industries.

- Public Safety
- Military and government
- Utility and public works
- Material handling
- Transportation
- Healthcare
- Mobile professionals

== Associations ==
- NAFA Fleet Management Association
- NTEA
- MHI
- Automotive Fleet & Leasing Association (AFLA)
- International Association of Chiefs of Police (IACP)
- National Rural Electric Cooperative Association (NRECA)
- Rocky Mountain Fleet Management Association (RMFMA)
- VDC Research Group
- United States Police Canine Association (USPCA)
- Los Angeles Police Foundation
- Sheriff’s Association of Texas

=== Partnerships ===
Havis, Inc., partners include Dell, Panasonic, Whelen, Getac, Ford, Chevrolet, Dodge, NetMotion Wireless, Sierra Wireless, Ace K9, Brother, and Motorola.

== In the media ==
Havis products have been featured in numerous television series, including Storm Chasers, Blue Bloods, Dateline NBC, Jeopardy!, Alaska State Troopers, NCIS, Law & Order, and Major Crimes.
