= William Tennent Jr. =

Irish Presbyterian minister (1705–1777)

Portrait by John Smibert

William Tennent Jr (June 3, 1705 – March 8, 1777), was a Presbyterian clergyman, the second of the four sons of William and Catharine (Kennedy) Tennent, two years younger than his brother Gilbert. Tennent was born in County Armagh, Ireland, and emigrated to America with his parents. Tennent was a member of the South Carolina Assembly and the Provincial Congress who published essays in support of the Patriot cause after the passage of the Tea Act.

Log College, Pennsylvania (Note: See: Log College graduates)

Tennent received his education at "Log College" at Neshaminy, Pennsylvania, established by his father William Sr., and then studied theology under his older brother Gilbert, pastor of the church at New Brunswick, New Jersey. While attending classes he mysteriously collapsed and was taken for dead, but to the surprise of family and friends he regained consciousness and regained his health in about a year's time. Shortly after the founding of the College of New Jersey Tennent became one of its trustees.

William and his father and brothers were close friends of George Whitefield, a central figure in the First Great Awakening, a religious revival that swept the northern colonies in the mid-1700s. During the American Revolutionary War Tennent served as a Chaplain in the Connecticut Militia.

When William was twenty-eight a vacancy at the church at Freehold, New Jersey, was occasioned by the death of his brother, John, whereupon William was called to fill that pulpit. Upon acceptance he was duly ordained and installed at that station on October 25, 1733. After serving for forty-four years he died on March 5, 1777, at the age of 72 and was interred in a vault beneath the church.

== See also ==
- Freedom of religion in the United States
- Old Side–New Side controversy
- Jacob Duché – Served as the first official chaplain to the Continental Congress in Philadelphia.

== Sources ==
- Alexander, Archibald (1851). Biographical Sketches of the Founder and Principal Alumni of the Log College. Presbyterian Board of Publication.
- Kramer, Leonard J. (March 1954). "Muskets in the Pulpit". Journal of the Presbyterian Historical Society (1943–1961). 32 (1): 37–51. JSTOR 23325210.
- Kidd, Thomas S. (2007). The Great Awakening. Yale University Press. ISBN 978-0-300-11887-2.
- Krawczynski, Keith (2001). William Henry Drayton : South Carolina revolutionary patriot. LSU Press. ISBN 978-0-8071-2661-5.
- Murphy, Thomas (1889). The Presbytery of the log college. Philadelphia: Presbyterian Board of Publication and Sabbath-School Work.
- Starr, Harris Elwood. "Tennent, William". Dictionary of American Biography. Vol. XVIII. New York: Charles Scribner's Sons. pp. 370–371.
