= Upper Southampton Township, Pennsylvania =

Township in Pennsylvania, US

- Township
- Township of Upper Southampton
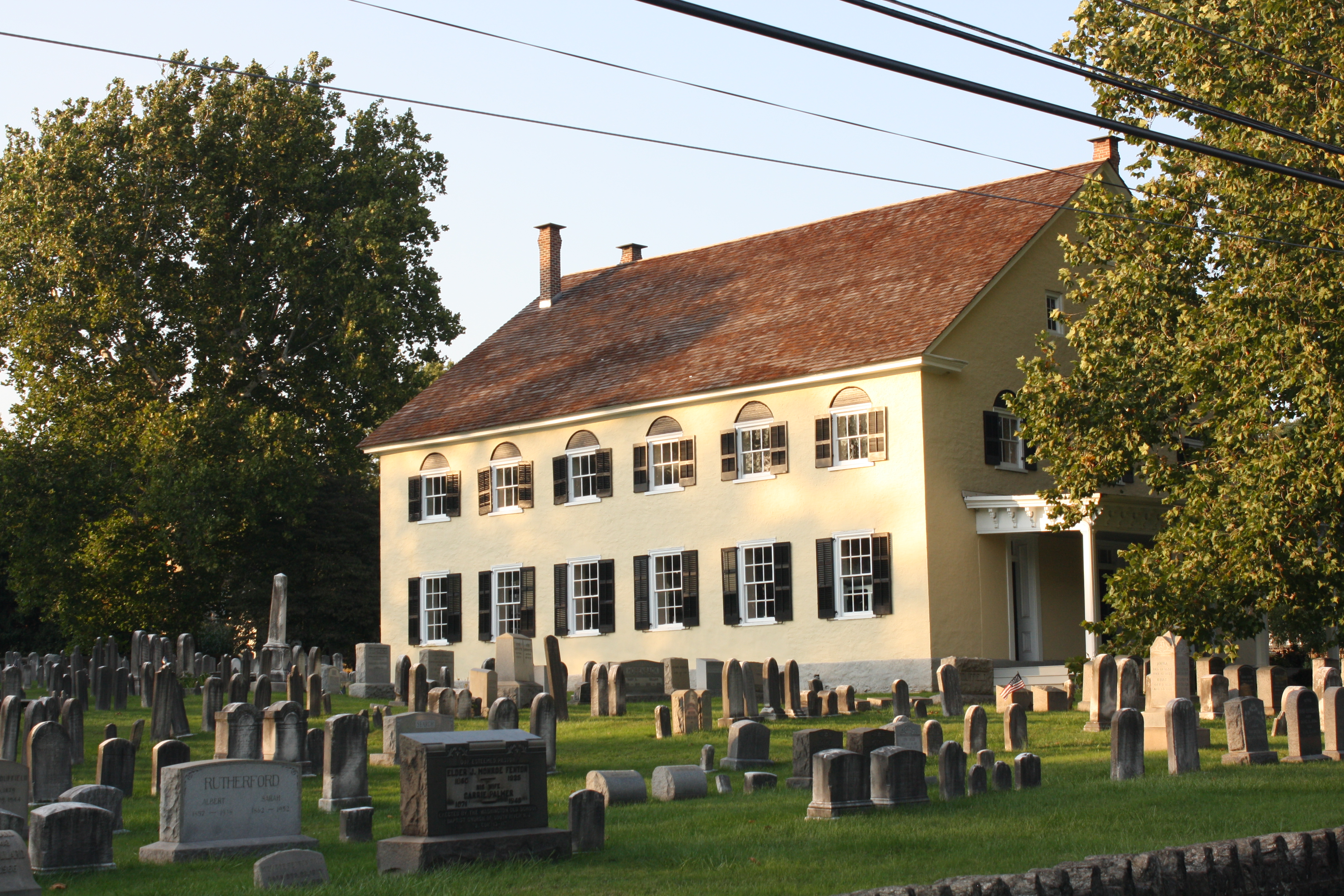
- Southampton Baptist Church and Cemetery, built 1772

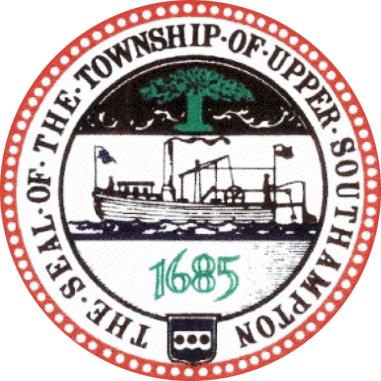
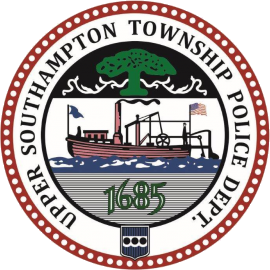
- Seal Police seal
- Motto: "A nice place to live!"
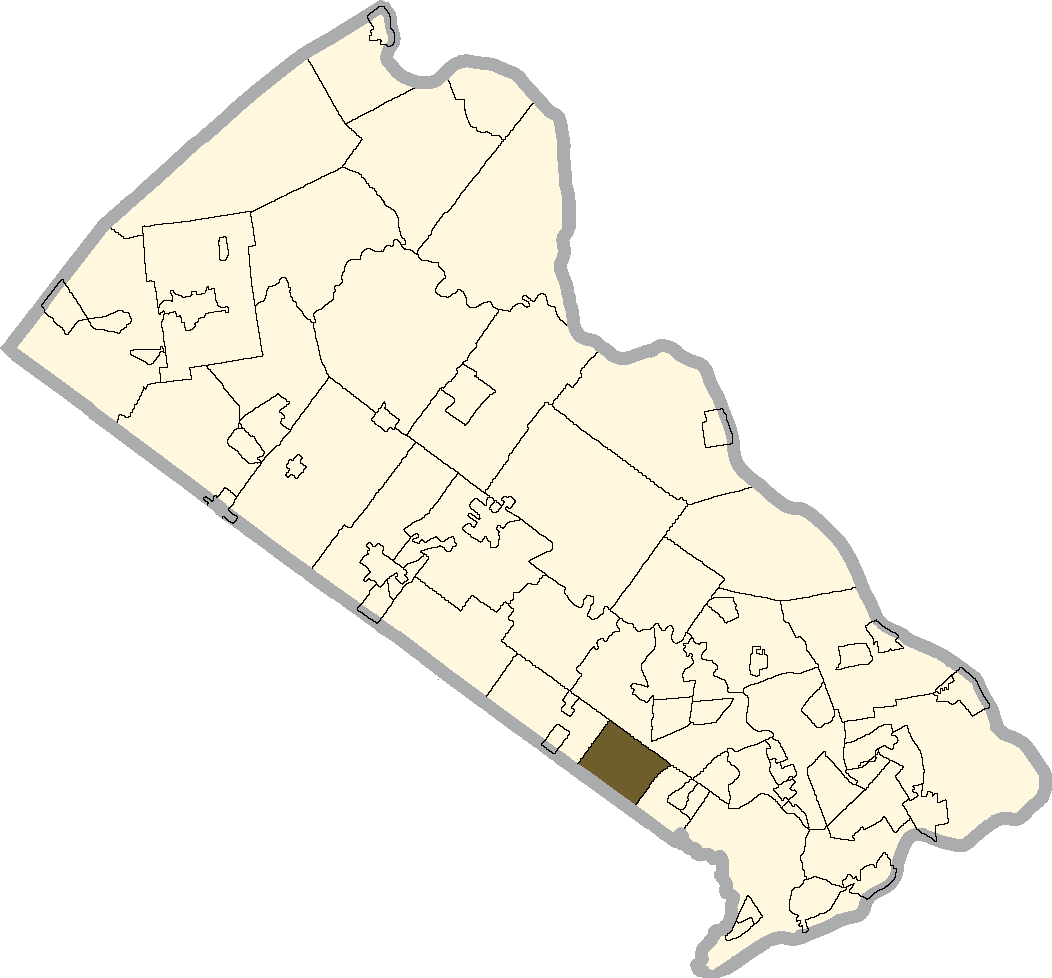
- Location of Upper Southampton Township in Bucks County

- Location in Pennsylvania and the United States Upper Southampton Township (the United States)
- Coordinates: 40°10′33″N 75°02′21″W
- Country: United States
- State: Pennsylvania
- County: Bucks

Area
  - Total: 6.63 sq mi (17.2 km^{2})
  - Land: 6.62 sq mi (17.1 km^{2})
  - Water: 0.01 sq mi (0.026 km^{2})
- Elevation: 249 ft (76 m)

Population (2010)
  - Total: 15,152
  - Estimate (2016): 15,041
  - Density: 2,290/sq mi (884/km^{2})
- Time zone: UTC-5 (EST)
  - Summer (DST): UTC-4 (EDT)
- Area codes: 215, 267 and 445
- FIPS code: 42-017-79296
- Website: www.ustwp.org

Upper Southampton Township is a township in Bucks County, Pennsylvania, United States. The population was 15,152 at the 2010 census.

== Geography ==
According to the United States Census Bureau, the township has a total area of 6.6 square miles (17.1 km^{2}), all land.

Past and present place names include Chinquapin, Churchville, Cornell, Davisville, and Southampton.

Natural features include Broad Axe Creek, Neshaminy Creek, and Pennypack Creek.

== Demographics ==
Historical population
Census	Pop.	Note	%±
1930	1,229		—
1940	1,314		6.9%
1950	2,027		54.3%
1960	7,941		291.8%
1970	13,936		75.5%
1980	15,806		13.4%
1990	16,076		1.7%
2000	15,764		−1.9%
2010	15,152		−3.9%
2020	15,269		0.8%

As of the 2010 census, the township was 95.8% White, 0.8% Black or African American, 0.1% Native American, 1.8% Asian, 0.1% Native Hawaiian, and 1.1% were two or more races. 1.6% of the population were of Hispanic or Latino ancestry.

As of the census of 2000, there were 15,764 people, 6,031 households, and 4,462 families residing in the township. The population density was 2,384.5 inhabitants per square mile (920.7/km^{2}). There were 6,123 housing units at an average density of 926.2 per square mile (357.6/km^{2}). The racial makeup of the township was 96.87% White, 0.77% African American, 0.06% Native American, 1.50% Asian, 0.02% Pacific Islander, 0.19% from other races, and 0.58% from two or more races. Hispanic or Latino of any race were 0.81% of the population.

There were 6,031 households, out of which 27.8% had children under the age of 18 living with them, 64.5% were married couples living together, 6.8% had a female householder with no husband present, and 26.0% were non-families. 22.6% of all households were made up of individuals, and 12.7% had someone living alone who was 65 years of age or older. The average household size was 2.58 and the average family size was 3.05.

In the township the population was spread out, with 21.6% under the age of 18, 6.0% from 18 to 24, 25.7% from 25 to 44, 27.1% from 45 to 64, and 19.6% who were 65 years of age or older. The median age was 43 years. For every 100 females there were 92.9 males. For every 100 females age 18 and over, there were 88.5 males.

The median income for a household in the township was $59,493, and the median income for a family was $66,889. Males had a median income of $46,368 versus $33,118 for females. The per capita income for the township was $26,362. About 1.5% of families and 2.6% of the population were below the poverty line, including 3.1% of those under age 18 and 5.5% of those age 65 or over.

== Climate ==
According to the Köppen climate classification system, Upper Southampton Township, Pennsylvania has a hot-summer, wet all year, humid continental climate (Dfa). Dfa climates are characterized by at least one month having an average mean temperature ≤ 32.0 °F (≤ 0.0 °C), at least four months with an average mean temperature ≥ 50.0 °F (≥ 10.0 °C), at least one month with an average mean temperature ≥ 71.6 °F (≥ 22.0 °C), and no significant precipitation difference between seasons. During the summer months, episodes of extreme heat and humidity can occur with heat index values ≥ 100 °F (≥ 38 °C). On average, the wettest month of the year is July which corresponds with the annual peak in thunderstorm activity. During the winter months, episodes of extreme cold and wind can occur with wind chill values < 0 °F (< -18 °C). The plant hardiness zone is 7a with an average annual extreme minimum air temperature of 1.1 °F (-17.2 °C). The average seasonal (Nov-Apr) snowfall total is between 24 and 30 inches (61 and 76 cm), and the average snowiest month is February which corresponds with the annual peak in nor'easter activity.

Climate data for Upper Southampton Township, Bucks County, Pennsylvania (1981 – 2010 averages)
Month	Jan	Feb	Mar	Apr	May	Jun	Jul	Aug	Sep	Oct	Nov	Dec	Year
Mean daily maximum °F (°C)	39.9 (4.4)	43.0 (6.1)	51.2 (10.7)	62.9 (17.2)	72.6 (22.6)	81.7 (27.6)	85.8 (29.9)	84.3 (29.1)	77.4 (25.2)	66.1 (18.9)	55.4 (13.0)	44.2 (6.8)	63.8 (17.7)
Daily mean °F (°C)	31.7 (−0.2)	34.3 (1.3)	41.7 (5.4)	52.4 (11.3)	61.9 (16.6)	71.4 (21.9)	75.9 (24.4)	74.4 (23.6)	67.2 (19.6)	55.6 (13.1)	46.1 (7.8)	36.2 (2.3)	54.2 (12.3)
Mean daily minimum °F (°C)	23.6 (−4.7)	25.6 (−3.6)	32.3 (0.2)	41.8 (5.4)	51.2 (10.7)	61.0 (16.1)	65.9 (18.8)	64.6 (18.1)	57.1 (13.9)	45.1 (7.3)	36.8 (2.7)	28.2 (−2.1)	44.5 (6.9)
Average precipitation inches (mm)	3.53 (90)	2.73 (69)	4.07 (103)	4.01 (102)	4.33 (110)	4.33 (110)	5.24 (133)	4.43 (113)	4.41 (112)	3.74 (95)	3.67 (93)	3.94 (100)	48.43 (1,230)
Average relative humidity (%)	66.2	62.7	58.7	57.9	62.4	65.9	66.9	69.1	70.0	69.5	67.7	67.8	65.4
Average dew point °F (°C)	21.7 (−5.7)	22.9 (−5.1)	28.3 (−2.1)	38.0 (3.3)	48.9 (9.4)	59.4 (15.2)	64.1 (17.8)	63.6 (17.6)	57.1 (13.9)	45.8 (7.7)	36.0 (2.2)	26.6 (−3.0)	42.8 (6.0)
Source: PRISM Climate Group

== Ecology ==
According to the A. W. Kuchler U.S. potential natural vegetation types, Upper Southampton Township, Pennsylvania would have an Appalachian Oak (104) vegetation type with an Eastern Hardwood Forest (25) vegetation form.

== Transportation ==
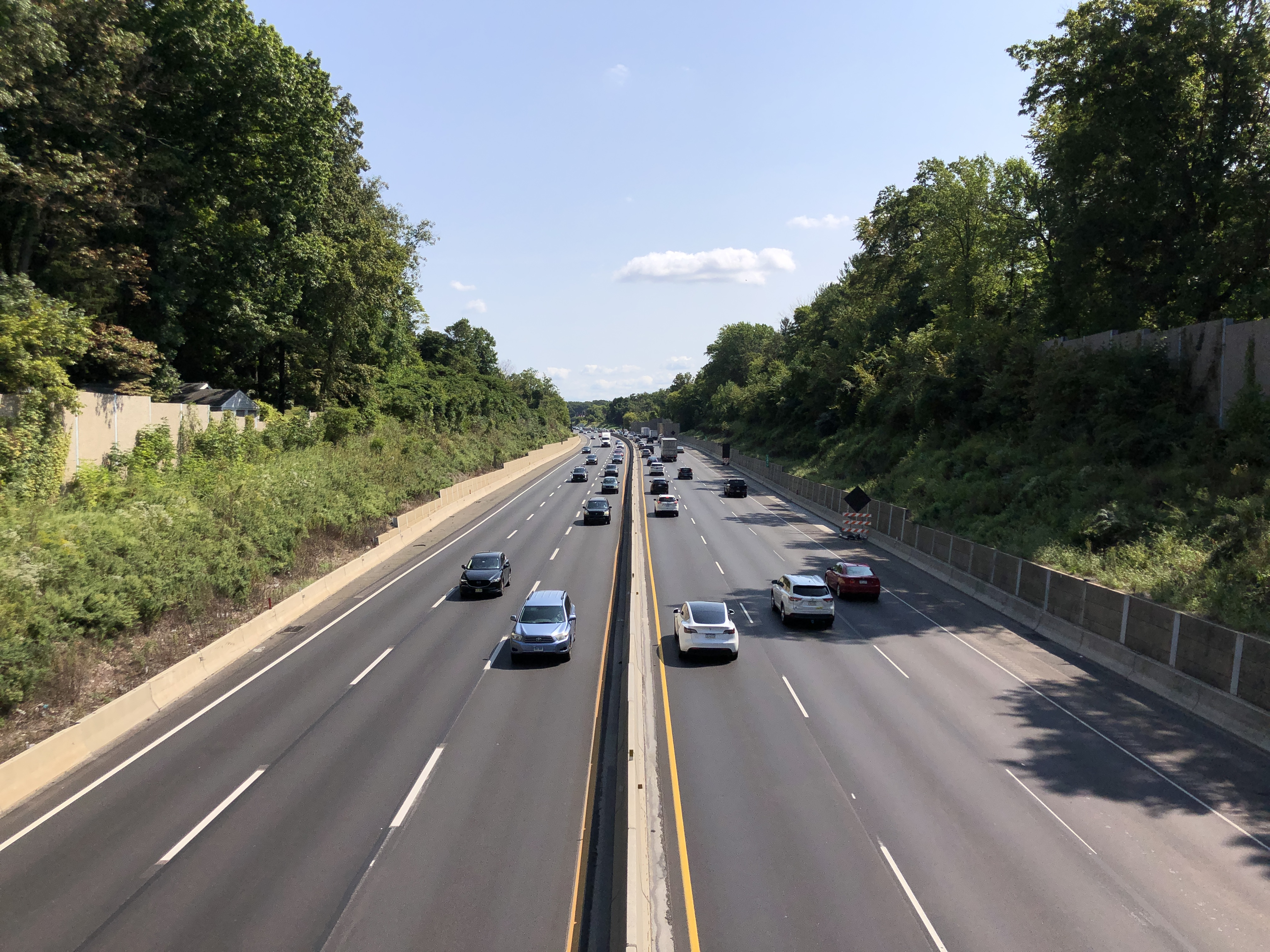
The Pennsylvania Turnpike/I-276 eastbound in Upper Southampton Township

As of 2018 there were 68.27 miles (109.87 km) of public roads in Upper Southampton Township, of which 2.00 miles (3.22 km) were maintained by the Pennsylvania Turnpike Commission (PTC), 10.50 miles (16.90 km) were maintained by the Pennsylvania Department of Transportation (PennDOT) and 68.27 miles (109.87 km) were maintained by the township.

The Pennsylvania Turnpike (Interstate 276) passes east–west through Upper Southampton Township, but the nearest interchanges are to the west in Willow Grove and to the east in Bensalem. Pennsylvania Route 132 runs northwest–southeast through the township along Street Road and Pennsylvania Route 232 runs north–south through the township along Second Street Pike. Other important roads include County Line Road, which runs northwest–southeast along the southwestern border with Montgomery County; Bristol Road, which runs northwest–southeast along the northeastern border of the township; Davisville Road, which runs southwest–northeast along the northwestern border of the township; and Bustleton Pike, which runs north–south through the eastern corner of the township. SEPTA provides bus service to Upper Southampton Township along SEPTA City Bus Route 24, which begins in Southampton and heads south to Bethayres, Rockledge, and the Frankford Transportation Center in Northeast Philadelphia. Norfolk Southern Railway's Morrisville Line freight railroad line passes east–west through Upper Southampton Township.

Upper Southampton Township had two commuter rail stations along SEPTA's Fox Chase/Newtown Line until February 1983, the Southampton station along Second Street Pike and the County Line station along County Line Road. Service was "temporarily" suspended due to a lack of ridership along the line. The train station has since been restored and is now a private residence. In the ensuing years (particularly post-1995), there has been interest in resuming passenger service by Bucks County officials; however, neighboring Montgomery County officials are staunchly opposed to it. Though rail service was initially replaced with a Fox Chase-Newtown shuttle bus, patronage remained light. The replacement bus service was far slower and less convenient than the train service it replaced, resulting in the shuttle bus being very unpopular. The traveling public never saw a bus service as a suitable replacement for a rail service.
