= Centennial School District (Pennsylvania) =

School district in Pennsylvania

Address
- 48 Swan Way Warminster, Bucks, Pennsylvania, 18974; United States

District information
- Type: Public
- Grades: K-12

Students and staff
- District mascot: Panthers

Other information
- Website: www.centennialsd.org

The Centennial School District is a public school district serving the Borough of Ivyland, Upper Southampton Township, and Warminster Township in Bucks County, Pennsylvania. The district operates one High School, two Middle Schools, three Elementary Schools and one Alternative School.

== Elementary schools ==
- William W.H. Davis Elementary School
- Everett A. McDonald Elementary School
- Willow Dale Elementary school

== Middle schools ==
- Log College Middle School
- Eugene Klinger Middle School

== High schools ==
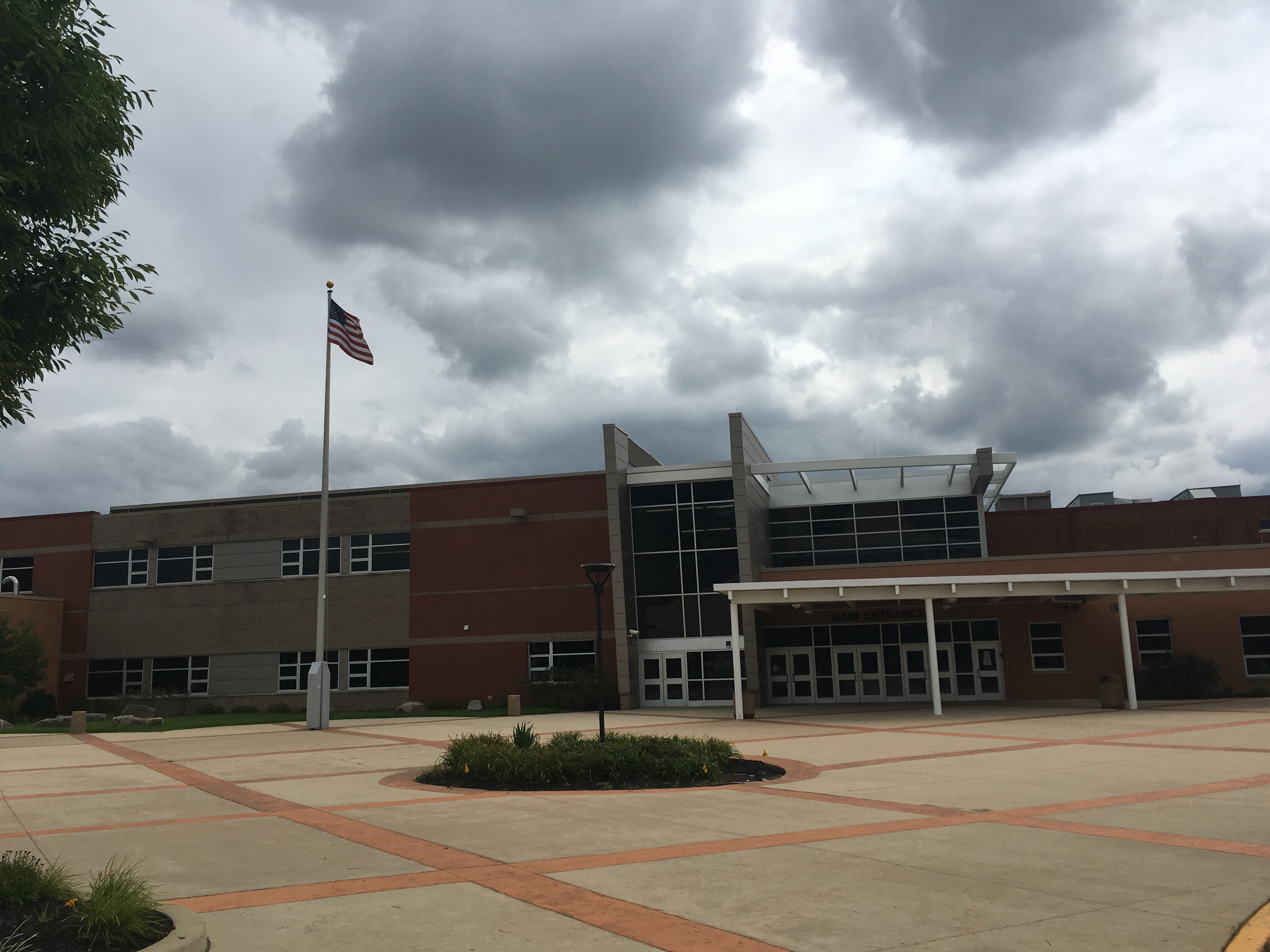
William Tennent High School

- William Tennent High School

== Alternative School ==
- Dorothy Henry Satellite School (closed)

== Closed Schools ==
- Warminster Elementary
- Lacey Park Elementary
- Johnsville Elementary
- Joseph Hart Elementary (1962 - 1988)
- William Tennent Intermediate High School
- Shelmire Elementary (a.k.a. (Upper) Southampton - Warminster High School)
- Fred J Stackpole Elementary (1965 - 2012)
- Alta S Leary Elementary
- Longstreth Elementary
- Middle Earth (Alternative)

== Other facilities ==
- Administration building - 48 Swan Way, Warminster PA 18974
- Transportation and Support Services - 305 West Street Road, Warminster PA 18974
- Planetarium - has been relocated from McDonald Elementary School to William Tennent High School.
