= John Rodgers (clergyman) =

Posthumous engraving, c. 1813

John Rodgers (1727 – 1811), was a Presbyterian minister and chaplain who served in this capacity through the American Revolution, where he met and corresponded with General George Washington. During his academic years he became friends with the future acclaimed ministers Samuel Davies and Samuel Blair, both of whom were active in the early years of the Great Awakening of the eighteenth century. Rodgers served the greater part of his ministry duties in New York City beginning in 1765. With the recommendations of Benjamin Franklin and George Whitefield he was awarded an honorary Doctorate of Divinity from the University of Edinburgh. During the Revolutionary War he also served as Chaplain for the military and as Chaplain of the Massachusetts Provincial Congress and New York State Constitutional Convention. Rogers, together with Robert Aitken, appealed to Washington and the Continental Congress about the need of Bibles among the American troops.

== Early life and family ==
Rodgers was born in Boston, Massachusetts, on August 5, 1727, the son of Thomas and Elizabeth (Baxter) Rodgers who had emigrated to Massachusetts from Derry, Ireland. They had two sons and six daughters. In 1728, driven out because of reoccurring Indian raids his family moved to Philadelphia. Rodger's mother, said to be a very religious and pious woman, was very influential in Rodger's subsequent aspiration to pursue the ministry.

Encouraged by his mother, Rogers attended the sermons of the revered George Whitefield, an itinerant preacher, while he was ministering in Philadelphia in 1739. (Note: This was Whitefield's first of several visits to Philadelphia where he formed a close association with Benjamin Franklin) Whitefield's exceptional and inspirational oratory left a lasting impression on Rodgers which ultimately led to his choosing a life of ministry some years later. The young Rodger's offered to assist Whitefield while he was visiting Philadelphia, where one evening he held a lantern for Whitefield as he was conducting a sermon. So moved by his sermon Rodgers managed to drop the lantern.

In 1741 Rodgers subsequently enrolled in a grammar school in Philadelphia, attended by Mr. Stevenson, an instructor of reputation. After a few months as Rodgers exceeded in his studies he transferred to another school in Philadelphia attended by Reverend Roan, a revered clergyman of the Presbyterian Church, where Rodgers continued to distinguish himself in his academic ability during the next few years. At the age of fourteen he regularly attended family worship in the house in which he boarded ; As Rodgers continued to mature he was frequently brought into contact with ministers and educators of the New Side Presbyterians. In the process he found himself increasingly at odds with the assumed authority of the Anglican Establishment. In the summer 1743, at the age of sixteen, he was sent to an acclaimed academy at Faggs Manor under the supervision of Reverend. Samuel Blair, considered one of the most respectable scholars among his contemporaries. Here he studied Latin, (Note: Soon after his ordination in 1749 Rodgers wrote a formal written renewal of his dedication to God in Latin.) Greek, Hebrew and science and distinguished himself in his theological studies. Rodgers' completed his theological studies under the direction Gilbert Tennent. Among his friends and classmates was Samuel Davies who would become a Reverend and the future president of the College of New Jersey

On September 19, 1752, Rodgers married Elizabeth Bayard, of Cecil County, Maryland with who they had four children, She died in January 1763. On Aug. 15, 1764, he married Mary (Antrobus) Grant, widow of William Grant, a Philadelphia merchant, with whom they had one child.

== Early Ministry ==
Rodger's first assignment was to assist accompany Reverend Samuel Davies to Virginia and assist him in evangelistic work. In his first attempt to obtain a license to minister he presented himself to the general court at Williamsburg but they declined without even considering his credentials. Undaunted he traveled to Somerset County, in Maryland where he labored during the summer of 1748. By autumn he accepted a call in Saint Georges in Delaware, on March 16, 1749, where he was ordained and installed as a minister, serving in "Forrest Church" for sixteen years. At his ordination Samuel Blair, presided in the laying on of hands by presbytery, and the sermon was delivered by Samuel Finley. In 1765, largely through his association with Reverend Davies, Rodgers was elected a trustee of the College of New Jersey; a position he held for more than twenty years.

Rodgers arrived in New York with his family on August 20, 1765, and was warmly received by the Presbytery of New York.at the Trinity Church. on Wall Street, Manhattan. On September 4 he was assigned as an assistant minister of Reverend Joseph Treat, with whom they immediately effected a powerful revival, resulting in a marked increase of members of the parish whom they were impelled to accommodate by constructing another church, which they completed in two years by 1768, which came to be known as the Old Brick Church.

Years later while Rodgers was riding with George Whitefield on his final visit to Philadelphia in 1770, Rodgers asked him if he remembered a young lad who was holding a lantern while he was reading a sermon to a gathering of people one evening, where the boy became so overcome with emotion that he dropped the lantern. Whitefield replied, "Oh yes, I remember it well..." Rodgers smiled and said, "I am that little boy", where Whitefield was overcome with emotion and embraced Rodgers as if he had found a long lost friend.

Whitefield was most impressed with Rodgers ministry that when he returned to London in 1769 he and Benjamin Franklin persuaded William Robertson, the principal of the University of Edinburgh, to grant Rodgers an honorary Doctorate of Divinity, which bore the date, December. 20, 1768. Before the document was officially authorized Robinson wrote to Franklin in a letter of 12 December 1768, concurring with his assessment of Rodgers' character and ability, and that the document would be dispatched at the earliest opportunity.

== American Revolution ==
Rodgers was an early, and a outspoken advocate for the cause of American independence.

In a sermon he gave on December 11, 1783 in New York City, Rogers brought attention to the fact that the eyes of the nations in Europe were upon the newly established United States and their arduous effort to establish a secure union:

"How dignified, how interesting, the path is plain before us. Would you reap the fruits of your toils, your losses and your Blood; it is indispensably necessary that the federal union of these States be cemented and strengthened—that the honor of the Great Council of the nation be supported, and its salutary measures carried into execution, with unanimity and dispatch, without regard to partial views, or local interests. ..."
— Rodgers

During the Revolutionary War, the churches experienced much disruption in their services by the incursions of the British army. Rodgers was compelled to leave his post in New York, to become chaplain, first of Heath's brigade, in Massachusetts. Thereafter he served as the chaplain for the Massachusetts Provincial Congress (Note: Not to be confused with John Rodgers of the Continental Congress.) and the Committee of Safety, the region's primary revolutionary governing body.

In November 1776 Rodgers was called to Savannah, Georgia, on important private business and subsequently resigned his ministry, and leaving his family still at Greenfield, departed overland for Savannah where his close friend and fellow reverend, John Zubly was residing. (Note: At the time, Reverend Zubly, had been a delegate from Georgia in the Continental Congress was the pastor of the Savanah's Independent Presbyterian Church. He opposed independence from Great Britain and became a Loyalist and fled to Georgia.) The year previous Zubly lodged with the Rodgers family, so Rogers naturally took time to visit him while in Savannah. In 1777 he left Georgia and returned to New York and moved his family to Sharon, Connecticut, where they spent the winter of 1777-78. Rodgers again relocated to Danbury for a brief tenure in its church. He then accepted a call from the congregation to be the minister at Lamington, New Jersey, and was installed in May 1780 where he ministered until the end of the war.

In 1783 the Treaty of Paris was signed, bringing an end to the war. After the British troops evacuated New York on November 25, Rodgers' family returned to the city and found it was generally left in a ruined state, including many of its churches. On May 23, 1785, the Synod of New York and Philadelphia appointed a committee who were tasked with the effort of creating a Presbyterian Church constitution. Members of the committee included, John Rodgers, John Witherspoon George Duffield and other prominent men of the clergy.

Rodgers delivered a Thanksgiving Day sermon that he had printed and sent to George Washington in Trinity Episcopal Church in the New York City, which welcomed him and his congregation to visit their “New Brick Church” was being repaired after the British occupation. Washington expressed his appreciation to Rodgers in a letter of May 5, 1784:

The thanksgiving Sermon which you did me the favor to send me, I read with much pleasure; & pray you to accept my thanks for it, & the favorable mention you have been pleased to make of me therein. My Compliments await Mrs Rogers — with great esteem and respect I remain Dr Sir—Yr most Obedt & Affecte Servt
—Go. Washington

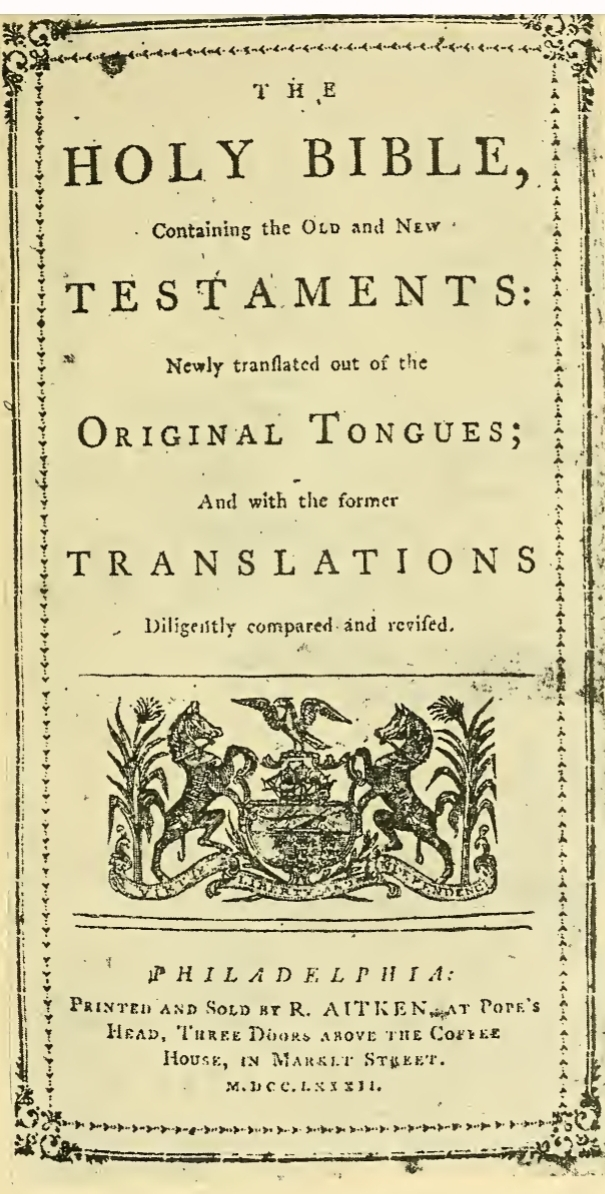
Aitken Bible, 1782 First English Bible printed in the United States

During the war, Rodgers and other Chaplains noticed that there was a severe shortage of Bibles among the troops. Before the Revolution it was not legal for unlicensed printers to print the English Bible. Subsequently, Bibles were often in short supply. (Note: The British Crown owned the printing rights to the King James Bible, making it illegal for unlicensed printers to print this Bible in the American colonies.) Most of the Bibles in the colonies had been printed in England and shipped over. The war with Britain, however, had cut off the supply of Bibles, along with paper and other printing supplies, and as such, Bibles were scare among the troops. Rodgers' friend, Robert Aitken, a printer form Philadelphia who had worked as the Congressional printer, also recognized the need and began the task of printing many hundreds of Bibles. Their sizes was markedly small so as to allow soldiers to easily carry them in their packs without a lot of extra weight. In the process in 1782 Aitken became the first to print the English Bible in the newly established United States. (Note: Not to be confused with the John Eliot Indian Bible of 1663.) The cost of production, however, was considerable, so Aitken petitioned the Continental Congress and procured loans for the production, equipment and distribution, which put him in serious debt. He appealed to Congress hoping it would purchase his Bibles, but was denied. He then asked his friend, Reverend Rodgers, to talk with General Washington about procuring the Bibles as gifts from Congress to the embattled soldiers who fought in the war with the expectation that they would never decline a request if it came from Washington. At that late date, however, the war had ended and most of the soldiers had returned their homes. Subsequently, a pragmatic Washington wrote back to Rodgers informing him that the plan at that point was futile since there were many printers who now had the freedom to print the bible without any royal oversight. (Note: For a comprehensive overview of the different types of Bibles that were emerging in the American colonies after independence was established see Newgrass, 1958.)

== Post revolution ==
Rodgers continued to be very active performing a variety of services for the Presbyterian Church, both in New York and Philadelphia, after American independence was established. On May 23, 1785, the Synod of New York and Philadelphia appointed Reverends John Rodgers and John Witherspoon, among others, as part of a committee to compose a Presbyterian Church constitution, similar to the one used in Scotland. In 1786 the synod appointed Rodgers and Witherspoon as part of a committee to establish a General Assembly and its constituent synods, which they completed in 1788. In 1789 the Synod of New York and Philadelphia decided at the first meeting that "Dr. Witherspoon, or in his absence, Dr. Rodgers, open the General Assembly with a sermon, and preside till a moderator be chosen." After the opening sermon by Witherspoon on May 21, 1789, Rodgers was subsequently elected as the first Moderator of the Presbyterian Church in America, The following year as he was about to retire as moderator he preached the opening sermon, using as his text of Acts 11:24. The Church, however, continued to employ him for a number of other services.

Rodgers wrote four sermons which were published in a four volume set entitled, The American Preacher, published in Elizabeth Town, New Jersey, in 1791-1793. When Witherspoon died in 1794, Rodgers wrote a sermon, The faithful servant rewarded , which he read at Witherspoon's funeral.

== Final years ==
Rodgers' health began to noticeably decline in late 1803 at the age of 77, where his infirmities compelled him to inform the church that he could no longer perform his pastoral duties nearly in the same capacity previously. As such, he was only able to deliver services on Sunday, but before long this was becoming too arduous an effort. He subsequently advised his fellow parishioners that they should begin securing other preachers to attend in his absence, to which the church administration acquiesced and unanimously concurred. Before long Rodgers began to show signs of a compromised memory, which, however he was fully aware of. By 1809 his physical condition was such that he could barely stand at the pulpit. As it were, he performed his last sermon with great difficulty, in September, unbeknownst to the congregation that it was his last sermon. The following year Rodgers' health was such that he was confined to his bed during the six weeks before his death. In the evening preceding his death, Rodgers prayed with his family for the last time. On Tuesday, May 7, 1811, Rodgers finally died at the age of 86, after sixty-three years of ministry. His family and long time friend Samuel Miller (Note: Miller was a Presbyterian theologian who taught at Princeton Theological Seminary, and author of Memoirs of the Rev. John Rodgers, published 1813.) were present when Rodgers passed. His funeral was held in the Brick Church on Thursday, May 9, with Reverend Philip Milledoler (Note: Miliedoler was an American Presbyterian and Dutch Reformed minister and the fifth President of Rutgers College) delivering the sermon. His body was interred in a vault at Old Brick Presbyterian Church Cemetery.

== Legacy ==
Aside from writing his sermons, Rodgers was not noted as eminent writer. Instead his forte was in action, not in writing, which he was not inclined to devote much effort into unless it served a practical and needed purpose. Rodgers is honored at Saint George's Church in Delaware, where his portrait hangs in their gallery. Rodgers' funeral was attended by thousands of friends and admirers and is said to have been the largest gathering of its kind in his day.

== See also ==
- Other Revolutionary chaplains:

Nathaniel Bartlett — Chaplain to General Putnam's Division
James Caldwell – Known as the "Fighting Parson," he ministered as a brigade chaplain.The English Crown placed a bounty on his head for greatly inciting the patriot cause.
Jacob Duché – Ministered as the first official chaplain to the Continental Congress in Philadelphia.
George Duffield – Ministered alongside Jacob Duché as a chaplain to the Continental Congress
Israel Evans – Ministered as a chaplain for the Continental Army and was widely regarded as "Washington's chaplain".
John Hurt — Reverend who ministered at Valley Forge
William Linn — First Chaplain of the United States House of Representatives
William Tennent Jr. — Chaplain in the Connecticut Militia

- Jonathan Mayhew — Reverend, publicly outspoken against the Stamp Act.

== Bibliography ==
- Alexander, Samuel Davies (1887). The Presbytery of New York, 1738 to 1888. New York: A. D. F. Randolph and Co.
- Belcher, Joseph (1857). George Whitefield - A Biography. New York: American Tract Society.
- Belden, Albert D. (1930). George Whitefield, the Awakener. Nashville: Cokebury Press.
- Duniway, Clyde A. (1906). The Devlopment of Freedom of the Press in Massachusetts. London: Longmans, Green and Co.
- Handy, Robert T. (June 1956). "John Rodgers, 1727-1811: A Life of Usefulness on Earth". Journal of the Presbyterian Historical Society (1943–1961). 34 (2): 69–82. JSTOR 23325134.
- Klett, Gut S. (September 1946). "A Phase of the Religious Influence in the Colonies of Our National Government". Journal of the Presbyterian Historical Society (1943-1961). 24 (3): 129–134. JSTOR 23324119.
- Kramer, Leonard J. (June 1953). "Presbyterians Approach the American revolution". Journal of the Presbyterian Historical Society (1943-1961). 31 (2): 71–86. JSTOR 23324733.
- —— (December 1953). "Muskets in the Pulpit". Journal of the Presbyterian Historical Society (1943-1961). 31 (4): 229–244. JSTOR 23325203.
- —— (March 1954). "Muskets in the Pulpit". Journal of the Presbyterian Historical Society (1943-1961). 32 (1): 37–51. JSTOR 23325210.
- Laing, John D. (2010). The Bible and U.S. Military Chaplains (PDF). Houston: Houston Christian University.
- Lemay, Joseph (2006). The Life of Benjamin Franklin. Philadelphia, PA: University of Pennsylvania Press. ISBN 978-0-8122-3855-6.
- Miller, Samuel (1813). Memoirs of the Rev. John Rodgers, D. D., late pastor of the Wall-street and Brick churches in the city of New-York. New York: Whiting and Watson, theological and classical booksellers. J. Seymour, printer.
- Nevin, Alfred (1884). Encyclopaedia of the Presbyterian church in the United States of America. Philadelphia: Presbyterian encyclopædia publishing co.
- Newgrass, Edgar (1958). An outline of Anglo-American Bible history. London: B.T. Batsford Ltd.
- Sprague, William (1858). Annals of the American Pulpit 1858. Vol. 3. New York: Robert Carter & Brothers. pp. 154–165.
- Starr, Harris Elwood (1935). "John Rodgers". Dictionary of American Biography. New York: Charles Scribner's Sons.
- Waugh, Barry (2019). "John Rodgers, 1727-1811". Presbyterians of the Past.
- Webster, Richard (1857). A history of the Presbyterian church in America : from its origin until the year 1760. Philadelphia: J.M. Wilson.

_{Primary sources}

- Aitken, Robert (9 June 1790). "Robert Aitken to George Washington, 9 June 1790". Letter to George Washington. Founders Online.
- Washington, George (11 June 1783). "From George Washington to John Rodgers, 11 June 1783". Letter to John Rodgers. Founders Online.
- Rodgers, John (May 30, 1783). "To George Washington from John Rodgers, 30 May 1783". Letter to George Washington. Founders Online.
- Washington, George (5 May 1784). "George Washington to John Rodgers, 5 May 1784". Letter to John Rodgers.
- Robertson, William (12 December 1768). "William Robertson to Benjamin Franklin, 12 December 1768". Letter to Benjamin Franklin. Founders Online.
- Rodgers, John (1795). The faithful servant rewarded : a sermon delivered at Princeton, before the Board of Trustees of the College of New-Jersey : occasioned by the death of the Rev. John Witherspoon. New York: Printed by Thomas Greenleaf.

Religious titles
Preceded by John Witherspoon	Moderator of the General Assembly of the Presbyterian Church in the United States of America; 1789	Succeeded by John Rodgers
