= Samuel Blair =

Samuel Blair may refer to:

- Samuel Blair (pastor) (1712–1751), leader of the Presbyterian New Light religious movement
- Samuel Blair (chaplain) (1741–1818), second Chaplain of the United States House of Representatives
- Samuel Steel Blair (1821–1890), Republican United States Representative from Pennsylvania
- Sammy Blair (1938–2011), Northern Irish badminton player
