= Samuel Davies (clergyman) =

American clergyman and poet

The Reverend Samuel Davies
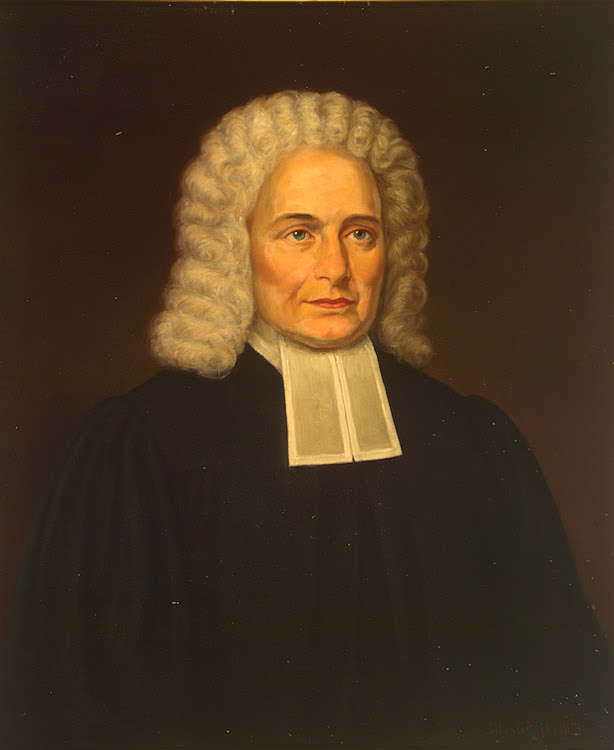

Evangelist Minister 4th President of Princeton University
- In office 1759–1761
- Preceded by: Jacob Green (acting)
- Succeeded by: Samuel Finley

Personal details
- Born: November 3, 1723 New Castle County, Delaware Colony
- Died: February 4, 1761 (aged 37) Princeton, Province of New Jersey
- Spouse(s): Sarah Kilpatrick (1746–1747); Jane Holt (1748–1761)
- Children: 6, including William
- Profession: Evangelist, University President, Poet, Hymnist

Samuel Davies (November 3, 1723 – February 4, 1761) was an evangelist and Presbyterian minister who was born into a family of English Dissenters from the Church of England. Davies ministered in Hanover County, the center of the Christian revival movement, from 1748 to 1759. He was a central figure who played a critical role in the early years of the Great Awakening, fomenting a religious revival among the colonies that advocated religious independence from England's established church, which inspired the cause for complete independence that ultimately lead to the disestablishment of the Church of England as Virginia’s official church. Davies was a dynamic and inspirational orator whose sermons were filled with pointed language that advocated for religious conversion. He followed serving a term as the fourth President of Princeton University, then known as the College of New Jersey, from 1759 to 1761. Davies was a strong advocate for religious freedom, and helped to institute significant religious reforms in the colony. He was one of the first non-Anglican preachers in Virginia, and one of earliest missionaries to slaves in the Thirteen Colonies. He voyaged to England, in 1753 where he met George Whitefield and John Wesley, also central figures in the Great Awakening. During the French and Indian War he served recruiting men by appealing to their sense of patriotism ans religion through his sermons, which were widely publicized throughout the colonies. Davies was also a prolific writer, authoring several hymns and publishing works of poetry and sermons. He was a strong voice for religious freedom and advocated humane treatment for slaves, and for providing them with religious education.

== Early life ==
Davies was born in New Castle County, Delaware, to David Davies and Martha Thomas Davies, Baptists of Welsh descent. Davies's mother eventually became a follower of Presbyterian doctrine, which led to his earliest exposure to Calvinist theology. A child of deeply religious parents, his mother named him after the prophet Samuel. Davies lived the life of a typical farm boy, helping his father in the fields and tending to chores about the farm. His father taught him how to hunt deer and squirrels, and fishing in the nearby Atlantic Ocean.

The Davies family could not afford to send their son to college, so they instead sent him to rceive his early education under the tutelage of Rev. Samuel Blair at the academy he conducted in Faggs Manor, Pennsylvania in 1739. The expenses of this promising student were borne by William Robinson, a frontier missionary and Davies' tutor. (Note: Robinson is noted for delivering the first-ever Presbyterian sermon in Hanover County, Virginia, in July 1743. Grateful congregants in Hanover tried to give Robinson a generous monetary gift, but refused it. Subsequently they secretly hid the money in his saddlebags, where Robinson accepted the funds by using them to theological training of Samuel Davies.) By the Spring of 1746, Davies, had completed his studies and was now, at the age of twenty-four, ready to assume a role preaching the Evangelical doctrines. (Note: Blair's son, also named Samuel, was a member of Princeton's graduating class of 1760, the final class over which Davies presided as school president. The younger Blair later became the second chaplain of the United States House of Representatives.) Among his classmates was the future Reverend John Rodgers. Later in his ministry Davies would declare that in all his travels he never had any teacher that would measure up to Blair.

== Ministry ==
=== Virginia Evangelist ===
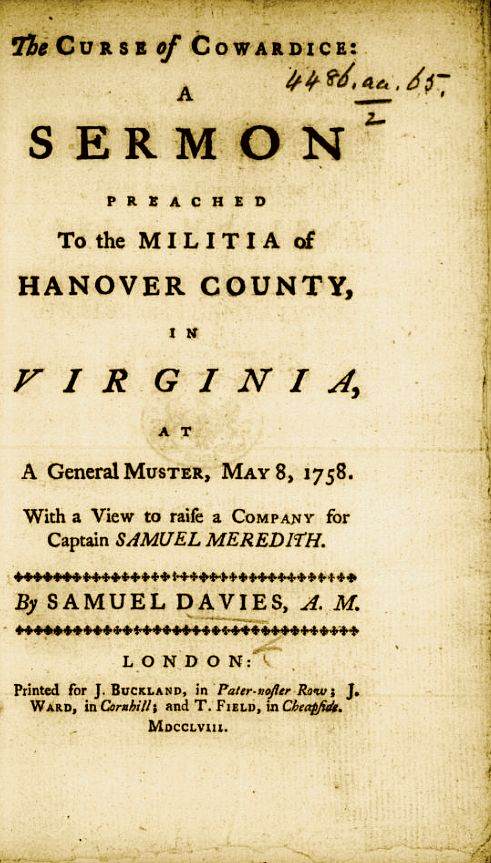
Sermon preached to the Militia of Hanover County, at a General Muster, May 8, 1758

After Davies completed his studies with Blair, the Presbytery of New Castle licensed him to preach on July 30, 1746. He joined the New Side synod of New York, and married Sarah Kirkpatrick on October 23, 1746. While he was preaching in Pennsylvania and Delaware, Sarah died from a miscarriage on September 15, 1747, shortly before their first anniversary. Her death inclined Davies to believe that he too was near death, and he therefore threw himself wholeheartedly into his preaching ministry.

Davies was ordained as an evangelist on February. 19, 1747, and was promptly sent to Virginia on evangelical missionary service to minister to religious dissenters against the Anglican Church. Dissenters who broke from the established Church of England were scorned by Church clergy and many Virginians, often incited by clergy, while their ministry efforts were always under persistent surveillance. At the time, when Davies settled in Hanover County, Virginia in 1748 there were already many lawsuits filed against Presbyterians for holding forbidden assemblies and preaching without a license from the General Court. The Church of England as the established Church in colonial Virginia, no colony was more protective of its authority, nor more hostile towards religious dissenters, than Virginia.

George Whitefield, who brought the revivalist movement to a head in Hanover County, had recently departed, and subsequently the enthusiasm behind the revivalist movement in Hanover gradually began to diminish. However, the calm did not last very long, for Whitefield and other such evangelists of the early 1740s had paved the way for an even greater revivalist thrust, and Davies was the leader in that advent. However, this provoked a renewed confrontation which emerged between the New Light Presbyterians and the colonial authorities who stood behind the established Church in Williamsburg. Because of the persistent efforts of William Tennent, Samuel Blair and especially Samuel Davies, Hanover soon became the center of the Great Awakening in the South and the "hotbed" of radical New Light Presbyterianism in Virginia. Their presence and activities was deemed a serious threat to the authority and supremacy of the Church of England in Virginia, whose preeminence had always been unabated.

Virginia's colonial legislature in 1743 had licensed Polegreen reading room and three others in and near Hanover County. Davies eventually led seven congregations in five counties, fulfilling his duties despite frail health from tuberculosis.

Davies eventually recovered his health and continued to preach. Young Patrick Henry attended many of Davies' sermons with his mother and acknowledged that as the source of his own oratorical skills; others called Davies without peer in the pulpit during his lifetime. Davies returned to Virginia in May 1748, and on October 4, 1748, married Jane Holt, from a prominent Williamsburg family. He fathered six children with Jane, including one child who died at birth and William.

As one of the first non-Anglican ministers licensed to preach in Virginia (with the now-dead Francis Makemie), Davies advanced the cause of religious and civil liberty in his era. Davies' strong religious convictions led him to value the "freeborn mind" and the inalienable "liberty of conscience" that the established Anglican Church in Virginia often failed to respect. Davies helped found the Presbytery of Hanover, encompassing all Presbyterian ministers in Virginia and North Carolina. He served as its first moderator and was considered the region's leading voice for religious dissenters. By appealing to British law and notions of British liberty, Davies agitated in an agreeable and effective manner for greater religious tolerance and laid the groundwork for the ultimate separation of church and state in Virginia that was consummated after his departure by the Virginia Declaration of Rights in 1776 and the Statute for Religious Freedom in 1786. Rev. Davies also served as the first minister at Providence Presbyterian Church in Louisa County, Virginia until his departure for New Jersey in 1759.

=== Evangelism of slaves ===
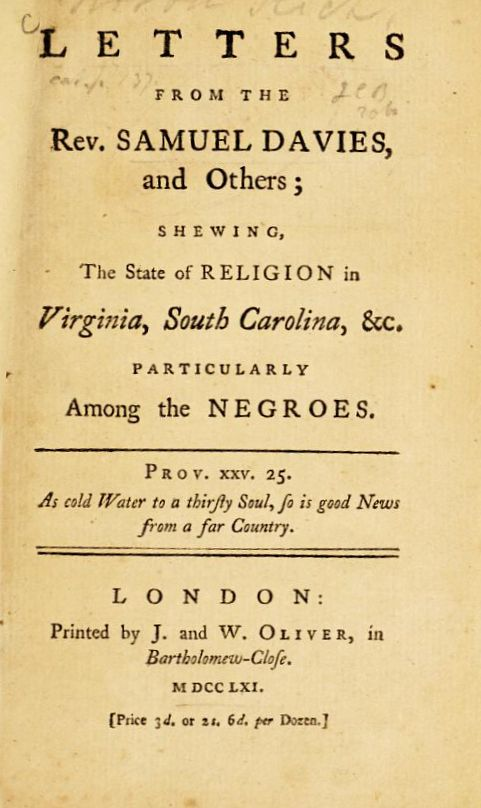
The State of Religion in Virginia, South Carolina, etc, particularly Among the Negros (Note: Opening passage: "... Since my last, I have baptized five or six adult Negroes... Those that have been formerly admitted, as far as I can learn, do in general behave as becometh Christians.")

Davies advocated educating slaves, including teaching them to read and write. Unlike Baptist and Methodist evangelists, who based conversion solely on an outpouring of the spirit, Davies believed that no one, regardless of race or social status, can have true religion without both hearing and reading the Word of God. To this end he employed the Holy Bible. Although personally not opposed to slavery, Davies believed that slaves deserved humane treatment and direct access to the word of God, the same as their masters. He was a strong believer in the spiritual equality of slaves, although he is known to have owned at least two slaves during his time in Virginia, believing that simply turning them free in an unfamiliar world with no means of self support would be a fate worse than slavery. He justified this activity by functioning as a benevolent master who provided well for their livelihood. Such reasoning was consistent with Presbyterian doctrine at the time, which stated that slavery was a political matter, not a church matter.

During a 1755 sermon Davies made the following statement to the slaves in attendance at the worship service:

You know I have shewn a tender concern for your welfare, ever since I have been in the colony: and you may ask my own negroes whether I treat them kindly or no.

Davies noted that the slaves owned by non-dissenters were often treated poorly in terms of their living situation, while those owned by Presbyterians and other dissenters were not over-worked and well provided for. Slaves became a particular focus of his ministry, and several contemporaries noted how Davies converted African slaves at unusually high numbers. Davies used the educational materials he received from his sponsors in London to instruct slaves, and also composed his own hymns. The classic spiritual "Lord, I want to be a Christian" reportedly originated at Polegreen. Rev. Davies eventually baptized hundreds of slaves as Christians, and they joined other members of the congregation at the communion table. His congregations allowed slaves to preach in the Church. Davies estimated that he ministered to over a thousand black people during his time in Virginia.

== Voyage to Great Britain ==
As Davies began his ministry in Virginia, six students began studies in Elizabeth, N.J., at the College of New Jersey, which had been established in 1746 to educate "those of every Religious Denomination." In 1753 the college's trustees persuaded Davies, famed for his work in Virginia, to make the dangerous voyage to Great Britain to raise money for the fledgling school. Davies and Tennent reached London on Christmas Day, December 25, 1753. While in Great Britain he met various prominent religious leaders, including George Whitefield, John and Charles Wesley, along with many prominent political figures. Whitefield was an itinerant preacher and a central figure in the Great Awakening in the American colonies. He invited Davies and Tennent to his home for the duration of their stay. Davies was thoroughly impressed with Whitefield and also recorded his encounter in his diary:

"He spoke in the most encouraging manner as to the success of our mission, and in all his conversation discovered so much zeal and candour, that I could not but admire the man as the wonder of the age! When we returned, Mr Tennent's heart was all on fire; and after we had gone to bed, he suggested that we should watch and pray, and we rose and prayed together till about 3 o'clock in the morning". — Davies

While in England Davies and Tennent made efforts to obtain donations for a new college, founded by Governor Jonathan Belcher at Princeton. This college was to train ministers for the Presbyterian Churches of six colonies. Inspired by their effort, Whitefield wholeheartedly used his influence and connections to help Davies and Tennent in their effort, to which Davies entered an account of the affair in his diary, Wednesday, December 26, 1753, where he commended Whitefield for offering his home to them during their stay in England. Davies was also successful in his appeal in getting the [Religious] Toleration Act (Note: England’s Toleration Act, passed by Parliament in 1699, was the most significant religious reform in England since its break with the Roman Catholic Church in the 1530s. The Act granted limited religious freedoms to certain Protestant groups outside the Church of England, which were deemed as “qualified dissenters" by the Anglican Church of England.) extended to Virginia, while also securing the appointment of a new and more sympathetic Governor, to which Whitefield was equally influential in achieving.

While the English Act of Toleration provided a good measure of relief to dissenters in England, contentions were levied in Virginia by the established Anglican authorities over whether such freedoms fully applied in that colony. Davies adamantly disputed the matter, (Note: Unlike the Quakers, Puritains, Scotch-Irish and Germans, members of the Anglican Church did not flee to the American colonies to obtain the religious freedom they already possessed in the first place. As such, they were not as adamant about religious freedom as were the dissenters from the Anglican Church.) always maintaining a civil and even a congenial tone, and then appealed to Virginia Attorney General Peyton Randolph, (Note: Randolph served as speaker of Virginia's House of Burgesses, president of the first two Virginia Conventions, and president of the First Continental Congress) who, while defending the application of the Act in its essence, did so while asserting strict legal limits. Other measures were stipulated, including the requirement that dissenters pay taxes to the Anglican Church, regardless if they already made offerings to their own church and pastor. As the colony's Attorney General, he took the position that the act protected dissenting Protestants to worship freely, but maintained that dissenting preachers could not receive multiple licenses to preach across unlimited parishes.

Davies disagreed, arguing that dissenting congregations were so dispersed that their ministers should "have a plurality of places licensed" as a measure of practicality. Peyton, however, maintained that such limitations also applied to Anglican priests, and therefore he could not offer preferential treatment for dissenters, which would, among other things, evoke the ire of Anglican clergy. After much deliberation from the General Court and the Governor's Council in Williamsburg, in April 1747, Davies secured an expanded license for additional meeting houses in 1748, but after further legalities and continued resistance from colonial officials, still had contentions over full applicability of the Act in Virginia. Undeterred, Davies, in 1752, appealed to British Attorney General Sir Dudley Ryder who confirmed the applicability of the Act in Virginia, which became the source of great controversy among colonial officials who made efforts to narrow its interpretation in an effort to stem the rate of dissent, requiring dissenting ministers to swear an oath to the King, and obtain licenses to preach and for places of worship, which required an substantial fee.

Davies confided the sometimes harrowing journey to his diary, writing "To be instrumental of laying a foundation of extensive benefit to mankind, not only in the present but in future generations, is a most animating prospect." Rev. Davies and a fellow Presbyterian minister, Gilbert Tennent spent eleven months in Great Britain, with Davies preaching sixty times. The two raised substantial sums, mainly through church collections. The grandson of Oliver Cromwell gave three guineas to support their efforts. Davies and Tennent eventually raised a total of four thousand pounds on behalf of the College of New Jersey ($237,559 in 2025), enough to build Nassau Hall as the first permanent building on the new campus in Princeton.

After his return from Great Britain, Davies's prominence in Virginia grew during the French and Indian War. Lieutenant Governor Dinwiddie declared Davies to be the colony's best recruiter, as he implored men to do their part "to secure the inestimable blessings of liberty.".

In 1759, four years after Davies returned from his British fundraising tour, the College's trustees called on him again, this time asking him to become the school's fourth president. Davies initially declined their offer, thinking that trustee Samuel Finley was better qualified. Eventually Davies accepted the job, and succeeded Jonathan Edwards, who had died just six weeks after his inauguration. David Cowell, a Princeton trustee who had served as acting president of the college from 1757-1758, conducted the negotiations that led to Davies accepting the position. Davies held Cowell in high regard, saying that he performed his duties with a great deal of "zeal, diligence and alacrity."

== French and Indian War ==
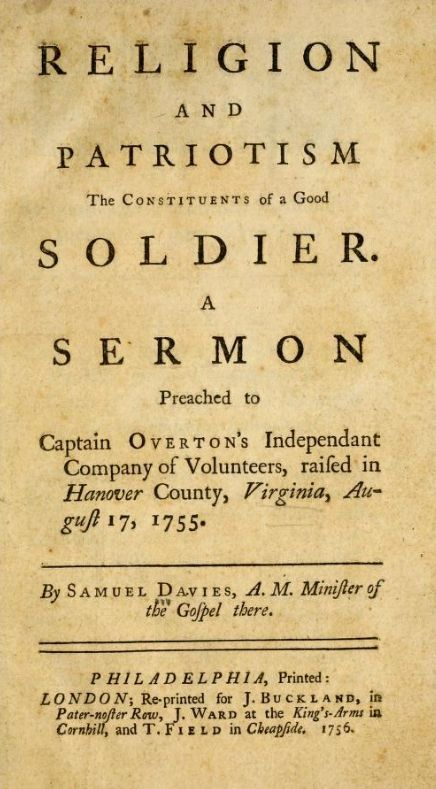
Religion and Patriotism (Note: Excerpt: "Shall neither the Fear of Jehovah's Curse, nor the Love of our Country, nor even the Love of ourselves, and our own personal Interest, constrain us at Length to relieve our ravaged Country, and defend the Blessings which God has entrusted to our Custody, as well as lent to us to enjoy? — Blessed be God, and Thanks to you, brave Soldiers, for what I now see. I see you engaged in this good Cause: and may the effectual Blessing of Heaven be upon you...")

When the French and Indian War broke out England was concerned that the French would gain control of the Ohio River Valley, while the colonists were fearful of losing many of their liberties, including Religious Liberty. Given the way the French, in the midst of religious fervor, were currently hanging Huguenot ministers and imprisoning many others in France, the colonists, many of whom were Huguenots, i.e. French Calvinists, who had a long history of fleeing from France, (Note: The legacy of French persecution of Huguenot Calvinists dates back to the reign of Louis XIV. who revoked the Edict of Nantes that granted Huguenots religious autonomy.) had little reason not to assume that there was a threat to religion in the colonies overall.

Upon his return to Virginia, Davies resumed his missionary duties and used his oratory ability on behalf of the British in an effort to muster volunteers among the colonists, many of whom were reluctant to commit to the war effort. To this end he preached a series of sermons that emphasized patriotism as an essential aspect of Christian behavior. During the Battle of the Monongahela, on July 9, 1755 in Pennsylvania, the British suffered a disastrous defeat with heavy losses, including the death of General Braddock. The experienced Washington, stepped in as acting commander, organized the retreat, and thereafter conducted a hasty funeral for General Braddock, reading from the Book of Common Prayer over his unmarked grave.The British defeat left the colonists in the general area completely undefended, and subsequently they were compelled to organize into militia forces for their own defense. Davies' preaching greatly helped to recruit volunteers for that cause.

Before the war the English Crown and the Anglican Church of England held a dim view over the dissenters who broke with the England's official church to form their own religion. Davies' recruiting efforts, however, won the appeal of the Crown and its governing body towards the dissenting movement, who now shared a common enemy, and who were subsequently regarded as badly needed allies in the war effort. Davies' enthusiasm in support of the war, as well as his recruitment efforts, were greatly appreciated by colonial authorities during that uncertain period. Their gratitude was evidenced when the acting Governor of Virginia, in 1758, gave his assurance to the Hanover Presbytery that he would use his influence to secure the provisions of the Act of Toleration. Historian Rhys Isaac submits that this may have been one of the reasons why "The House of Burgesses was largely inactive on the question of dissent in these years."

Two years into the War Davies delivered his famous sermon, "The Curse of Cowardice", on May 8, 1758, (Note: Davies' sermon,"The Curse of Cowardice", was transcribed and published in 1758. The Dedication was addressed to George Montagu-Dunk, 2nd Earl of Halifax, and his "Royal Majesty") to the militia of Hanover County, Virginia, at a general muster. In addition Davies published inflammatory essays in the Virginia Gazette under the pseudonym The Virginia Centinel. His essays were reprinted in newspapers throughout the colonies, fueling the resentment against the French and their Indian allies, while sharply criticizing the lack of public support in Virginia during the first years of the war.

Davies stressed the seriousness of the threat to the progress of evangelism in the Middle Colonies, and to Religious Freedom, and that ultimately that freedom could be lost if the enemy were to prevail over the colonies. Davies' great success in the recruiting effort ultimately accounted for much of the success he had in Virginia after the war had ended.

== Final days ==
In 1759 Davies was selected for President of Princeton University, though his term proved to be short lived, as he died in 1761 at the relatively young age of 37.

In his January 14, 1761, memorial sermon delivered at Nassau Hall, Davies paid tribute to King George II, who had died on October 25, 1760.

Can the British Annals, in the Compass of the Seventeen Hundred Years, produce a Period more favourable to Liberty, Peace, Prosperity, Commerce and Religion?…George the Great but Unambitious, consulted the Rights of the People, as well as of the Crown; and claimed no Powers but such as were granted to Him by the Constitution….His Parliament were his faithful Counselors; to whom He communicated His Measures….How different would have been our Situation under the baleful Influence of the ill boding Name of Stuart.
— Davies

Davies final published sermon was entitled "A Sermon on the New Year," delivered at Princeton on New Year's Day, 1761. He eerily, preached using Jeremiah 28:16 as his reference text, proclaiming that "it is not only possible--but highly probable, that death may meet some of us within the compass of this year." Almost prophetically, Davies died one month later from pneumonia, on February 4, 1761. Rev. Finley succeeded him as the school's president. Davies was buried alongside his predecessor in Princeton Cemetery.

== Legacy ==
=== Preacher and orator ===
Davies accomplished much despite his relatively short life, and lived the creed to which he exhorted the Princeton Class of 1760, in his baccalaureate address, which has been echoed by the presidents of Princeton throughout its history: "Whatever be your place, imbibe and cherish a public spirit. Serve your generation." Samuel Davies was one of the major contributors to the Great Awakening, a series of religious revivals which eventually caused America to break away from the Church of England. Davies' rhetorical gifts were renowned, and among the many people influenced by him was the orator and future Founding Father Patrick Henry. Henry was taken to listen to many of Davies' sermons as a young boy, often reciting portions of them aloud at his mother's request. He would later claim that Davies had taught him "what an orator should be”, and considered Davies to be the greatest speaker he had ever heard.

Davies took his preaching very seriously, and believed that sermons should be delivered "with a grave and affectionate solemnity." A contemporary and friend, minister David Bostwick said that Davies' sermons were "adapted to pierce the conscience and affect the heart," while William Buell Sprague noted that "he spoke with a glowing zeal...and an eloquence more impressive and effective than had then ever graced the American pulpit." Davies' sermons went through several editions in the United States and England, and for fifty years after his death they were among the most widely read in the English language. The first five volumes of sermons were printed in London from 1767 to 1771, and the best known American edition is three-volume set, which appeared in New York in 1851. Davies' sermons were more widely read than those of any of his contemporaries and as such has been noted by various revivalist historians for being the most influential revivalist of his time".

Though Davies did not pursue the idea of total separation of Church and State, his zeal and adore for religious toleration in Virginia gave much impetus for the statesmen of the Revolutionary period to establish complete religious liberty in the newly established America nation.

=== Hymn writer and poet ===
Musicologists credit Davies with being the first American-born hymn writer. Davies followed the lines of Isaac Watts, and while his verses are considered "solid, but somewhat dry and heavy," several of his hymns maintained popularity in American hymnals into the twentieth century. Two of his most popular hymns are "Eternal Spirit, Source of Light," and "Great God of wonders, all Thy ways." In 1752, Davies had a collection of his poems published in Williamsburg, titled Miscellaneous Poems, Chiefly on Divine Subjects. Davies' poems were written in the meditative style of Edward Taylor, although his attempts at putting "sublime evangelical rhetoric into couplet form" produced writing that had a "cramped" style.

=== Educator author and evangelist ===
Even before becoming president of Princeton Davies proved to be highly beneficial to the university. In addition to raising money to build Nassau Hall, (Note: In 1783 Nassau Hall served as the United States Capitol building for four months. In 1756, Nassau Hall was the largest building in colonial New Jersey and the largest academic building in the American colonies) Davies received funding from Great Britain in order to build a house for the school's president, and to start a charitable fund to educate young people. Upon his selection as president one trustee wrote to another "I believe there was never a College happier in a president. You can hardly conceive what prodigious, uncommon gifts the God of Heaven had bestowed on that man." While serving as the school's president, Davies drew up the first catalog of the university library, 1,281 books in all. Davies' efforts to evangelize slaves in Virginia has come to be called "the first sustained proselytization of slaves" in that colony, earning him scholarly attention into the present day.

During his term as President of Princeton Davies initiated several important changes in the university's standards.; The requirements for a Bachelor's degree was raised, while the requirements for admission into the University were strengthened.

Davies authored some 82 sermons during his lifetime as a clergyman, many of which were published posthumously. A partial listing follows:

Davies' sermons, transcribed and publicized
The entire text of each sermon can be found in Davies'
Sermons on Important Subjects, 1854, Volumes 1-3

- The Method of Salvation through Jesus Christ.
- The Danger of Lukewarmness in Religion.
- Life and Immortality Revealed in the Gospel.
- Jesus Christ the Only Foundation.
- The Necessity and Excellence of Family Religion.
- The Compassion of Christ to Weak Believers.
- God is Love.
- The Nature of Looking to Christ Opened and Explained.
- The Success of the Ministry of the Gospel, owing to a Divine Influence.
- The Sufferings of Christ and their Consequent Joys and Blessings.
- The Method of Salvation Through Jesus Christ.
- Christ Precious to All True Believers.
- One Thing is Needful.
- The Divine Authority of the Christian Religion.
- The Nature and Process of Spiritual Life.
- The Connection between Holiness and Felicity.
- Life and Immortality Revealed in the Gospel.
- Sinners Entreated to be Reconciled to God.
- The divine Authority and Sufficiency of the Christian Religion.
- The Nature and Danger of making light of Christ and Salvation.
- The Mediatorial Kingdom and Glories of Jesus Christ.
- The Nature and Universality of Spiritual Death.
- The Curse of Cowardice.
- The Happy Effects of the Pouring out of the Spirit.
- The Nature and Author of Regeneration.
- The Sacred Import of the Christian Name.
- The One Thing Needful.
- The Vessels of Mercy and the Vessels of Wrath Delineated.
- The Nature and Necessity of True Repentance.
- The Nature and Blessedness of sonship with God.
- Indifference to Life Urged, from its Shortness and Vanity.
- Ingratitude to God an Heinous but General Iniquity.
- Dedication to God Argued from Redeeming Mercy.
- An Enrolment of our Names in Heaven the Noblest Joy.
- The Rule of Equity.
- Religion and Patriotism the Constituents of Good Soldiers.
- The Divine Mercy to Mourning Penitents.
- The Danger of Lukewarmness in Religion.
- The Wonderful Compassions of Christ to the Greatest Sinners.
- Religion the Highest Wisdom, and Sin the Greatest Folly.
- A sermon delivered at Nassau-Hall, January 14, 1761, on the death of His late Majesty King George II

== Archival collections ==
The Presbyterian Historical Society in Philadelphia, Pennsylvania, has a collection of Davies' personal papers, including correspondence with Rev. David Cowel, manuscripts of his sermons and a manuscript for one of Davies' published works.

== See also ==
- Presbyterianism
- Divergence between Anglicanism and Methodism
- Colonial Virginia
- Second Great Awakening
- Slavery in Virginia

== Bibliography ==
- Anderson, James, S. M. (1856). The history of the Church of England in the colonies. Vol. III. London Rivingtons.
- Barton, David (2009). America's Godly Heritage. Wallbuilder Press. ISBN 978-0-9252-7929-3.
- Belden, Albert D. (1930). George Whitefield, The Awakener. S. Low, Marston & Company, Limited.
- Bost, George H. (June 1948). "Samuel Davies, Preacher of the Great Awakening". Journal of the Presbyterian Historical Society (1943-1961). 26 (2): 65–86. JSTOR 23324154.
- Dallimore, Arnold A. (1980). George Whitefield: The Life and Times of the Great Evangelist of the Eighteenth-Century Revival. Vol. II. Edinburgh or Carlisle: Banner of Truth Trust. ISBN 978-0-85151-300-3.
- Eckert, Allan W. (1971). Wilderness Empire. Bantam books, Inc. ISBN 978-0-9450-8498-3.
- Ellis, Thomas Talbot (May 1983). "Samuel Davies: Charactestics of His Life And Message". Banner of Truth (236).
- Henry, William Wirt (1891). Patrick Henry: Life, Correspondence and Speeches. Vol. I. New York: Charles Scribner's Sons. p. 15.
- Hockman, Dan M. (June 1985). "William Dawson and the Anglican Church in Virginia, 1743-1752". Historical Magazine of the Protestant Episcopal Church. 54 (2). Historical Society of the Episcopal Church: 125–149. JSTOR 42974069.
- Hockman, Dan M. (June 1990). ""Hellish and Malicious Incendiaries": Commissary William Dawson and Dissent in Colonial Virginia, 1743-1752". Anglican and Episcopal History. 59 (2): 150–180. JSTOR 42610402.
- Isaac, Rhys (January 1973). "Religion and Authority: Problems of the Anglican Establishment in Virginia in the Era of the Great Awakening and the Parsons' Cause". The William and Mary Quarterly. 30 (1): 3–36. doi:10.2307/1923701. JSTOR 1923701.
- Leitch, Alexander (1978). "Davies, Samuel". A Princeton Companion. Princeton, NJ: Princeton University Press. ISBN 978-0-6910-4654-9. Archived from the original on 10 February 2012.
- Maxson, Charles Hartshorn (1958). The Great Awakening in the middle colonies. Gloucester, Massachusetts: Peter Smith, Publisher.
- McIlwaine, Henry R. (1894). The struggle of Protestant dissenters for religious toleration in Virginia. Johns Hopkins Press.
- Miller, Samuel (1813). Memoirs of the Rev. John Rodgers, D. D., late pastor of the Wall-street and Brick churches in the city of New-York. New York: Whiting and Watson, theological and classical booksellers. J. Seymour, printer.
- Pilcher, George William (1971). Samuel Davis Apostle of Dissent in Colonial Virginia. The University of Tennessee Press.
- Pomfret, John E. (1932). Malone, Dumas (ed.). Dictionary of American biography. Vol. V. New York: Charles Scribner's Sons.
- Ragosta, John A. (2010). Wellspring of liberty : how Virginia's religious dissenters helped win the American Revolution and secured religious liberty. Oxford; New York: Oxford University Press. ISBN 978-0-1953-8806-0.
- Richards, Jeffrey H. (2003). "Samuel Davies and the Transatlantic Campaign for Slave Literacy in Virginia". The Virginia Magazine of History and Biography. 111 (4). Richmond: Virginia Historical Society: 333–378. JSTOR 4250141.
- Sweet, William Warren (1942). Religion In Colonial America. Charles Scribner's Sons.
- Thomson, Gale (2005). "Samuel Davies". Dictionary of Literary Biography. Thomson Corporation. ISBN 0787681733.
- Waugh, Barry (2024-06-01). This Day in Presbyterian History: New School Synod Minutes!.

=== Primary sources (works) ===
- Davies, Samuel (1756). Religion and patriotism the constituents of a good soldier. Philadelphia: J. Buckland.
- —— (1758). The Curse of Cowardice: a sermon preached to the militia of Hanover County, in Virginia, at a general muster, May 8, 1758. London: J. Buckland.
- —— (1761). Letters from the Rev. Samuel Davies, and others; shewing, the state of religion in Virginia, South Carolina, &c. particularly among the negroes. London: J. and W. Oliver.
- Davies, Samuel (1761). A sermon delivered at Nassau-Hall, January 14, 1761, on the death of His late Majesty King George II. Boston: R. Draper.
- —— (2024). The Sermons of the Rev. Samuel Davies (PDF). Monergism Books.
- —— (1967) [1753-1755]. Pilcher, William (ed.). The Reverend Samuel Davies abroad; the diary of a journey to England and Scotland, 1753-55. Urbana: University of Illinois Press.
- —— (October 1968). Pilcher, William (ed.). The Reverend Samuel Davies Abroad: The Diary of a Journey to England and Scotland 1753-55.

==== Sermons ====
- Davies, Samuel (1864). Sermons. Vol. I. Philadelphia: Presbyterian Board of publication.
- —— (1864). Sermons. Vol. II. Philadelphia: Presbyterian Board of publication.
- —— (1864). Sermons. Vol. III. Philadelphia: Presbyterian Board of publication.
- —— (1854). Barnes, Albert (ed.). Sermons on Important Subjects. Vol. I (Third American ed.). Boston: Lincoln & Edmands. p. 54.
- —— (1854). —— (ed.). Sermons on Important Subjects. Vol. II (Third American ed.). Boston: Lincoln & Edmands.
- —— (1854). —— (ed.). Sermons on Important Subjects. Vol. III (Third American ed.). Boston: Lincoln & Edmands.

=== Website sources ===
- "Samuel Blair Sermons, 1766-1769: Finding Aid". Princeton University Library. 2008. Archived from the original on 16 March 2014.
- Myers, R. Andrew (2026). "Samuel Davies Was Born 300 Years Ago". Log Cabin Press.
- Whitley, William Bland. (18 January 2012). "Samuel Davies (1723–1761)". Encyclopedia Virginia.
- Morales, R. Isabela (2026). "Samuel Davies". Princeton University, Slavery History Project.
- "Samuel Davies: The Apostle of Virginia". Institute in Basic Life Principle, Chicago. 2026.
- Virginia Historic Landmarks Commission staff (October 1972). "National Register of Historic Places Inventory/Nomination: Providence Presbyterian Church" (PDF). Virginia Department of Historic Resources.
- "Samuel Davies". Calvinist Institute of Christian Worship.
- Moorhead, James. "Princeton and Slavery: Presbyterians and Slavery"..
- "The Presidents of Princeton University". Princeton university.
- Guide to the Samuel Davies Papers. Presbyterian Church USA.
- Mitchell, Henry H. "Col. William Davies". VictorianVilla.
- "The Polygreen Story".
- "Samuel Davies, Peyton Randolph, and the Act of Toleration in Virginia". The Colonial Williamsburg Foundation.
- Samuelson, Richard (May 2, 2013). "The Blackstonian Causes of the American Revolution". The Imaginative Conservative.

=== Further reading ===
- Goodwin, Gerald L. (1966). "The Anglican Reaction to the Great Awakening". Historical Magazine of the Protestant Episcopal Church. 35 (4). Historical Society of the Episcopal Church: 343–371. JSTOR 42973163.
- Gledstone, James Paterson (1871). The Life and Travels of George Whitefield, M. A. Longmans, Green, and Company.
- Gordon, Alexander (1900). "Whitefield, George" . In Lee, Sidney (ed.). Dictionary of National Biography. Vol. 61. London: Smith, Elder & Co.
- Lingle, Walter Lee (1978). Presbyterians, their history and beliefs. Atlanta, Georgia: John Knox Press. ISBN 978-0-8042-0985-4.
- Melton, J. Gordon (1987). The Encyclopedia of American Religions. Gale Research Company. p. 275. ISBN 978-0-8103-2133-5.
- Murray, Lain Hamish (1994). Revival and revivalism : the making and marring of American evangelicalism 1750-1858. Edinburgh: Banner of Truth Trust. ISBN 978-0-8515-1660-8.
- Pilcher, George William (November 1965). "Samuel Davies and Religious Toleration in Virginia". The Historian. 28 (1): 48–71. doi:10.1111/j.1540-6563.1965.tb01742.x. JSTOR i24435329.
- Sturdy, David J. (1998). Louis XIV. New york: St. Martin's Press. ISBN 978-0-3122-1427-2.
- Tyerman, Luke (1876). The life of George Whitefield. Vol. I. London: Hodder and Stoughton, Publishers.
- Woodfin, Maude H. (1943). Malone, Dumas (ed.). Randolph, Peyton. Vol. XV. Dictionary of American Biography, New York: Charles Scribner's Sons.

Academic offices
Preceded by Jonathan Edwards	President of the College of New Jersey; 1759–1761	Succeeded by Samuel Finley
