= James Finley (minister) =

American politician

James Finley (February 4, 1725 – January 6, 1795) was an American Presbyterian minister and politician who was a pioneer resident of Western Pennsylvania. Either he or his wife owned the house in which Thomas Jefferson began his first attempt to draft the United States Declaration of Independence.

== Early life ==
James Finley was born on February 4, 1725, in County Armagh, Ireland, the son of Michael Finley and Anne, the daughter of Samuel O'Neill. He immigrated to America at the age of nine and studied under Samuel Blair at Faggs Manor Academy, in what is now Londonderry Township, Chester County, Pennsylvania.

In 1752, Finley married Hannah Evans (1715 – April 1, 1795), the daughter of Robert Evans. The couple had seven sons and two daughters. Eight of their children lived to adulthood. A son, James (1769–1772), died aged three.

James was the brother of Rev. Andrew Finley and brother and a student of Samuel Finley, (fifth president of the College of New Jersey, later known as Princeton University, from 1761 until 1766). James graduated from Princeton, though actually, he attended and graduated from the predecessor institution then known as William Tennant's Log College, in Neshaminy, Bucks County, Pennsylvania.

Benjamin Rush, a signer of the Declaration of Independence, was a cousin of the Finleys, and moved into the Samuel Finley home at the age of six upon the death of his father. Through his brother Samuel, James was likely acquainted with another signer of the Declaration of Independence, Richard Stockton, as well as Oliver Ellsworth, who became the third Chief Justice of the United States Supreme Court, and Ebenezer Hazard, who became Postmaster General.

== Ministry ==
Finley had a revival experience under the influence of Robert Smith and traveled with the noted evangelist George Whitfield. Finley was ordained in 1752 and became pastor of East Nottingham Church, near the disputed Maryland-Pennsylvania border.

He traveled to western Pennsylvania three or four times before 1782, possibly as early as 1765. In 1771, Finley conducted Sabbath services over the Allegheny Mountains under commission from the Presbyterian Synod of Philadelphia. In 1772 he traveled to Fayette County, Pennsylvania, with his son, Ebenezer, to a farm Finley had purchased near Dunlap's Creek.

In 1782 he accepted a call from the united congregations at the Forks of the Youghiogheny River to serve as pastor to several congregations and settlements.

In "Ever a Frontier: The Bicentennial History of the Pittsburgh Theological Seminary," a short biography of Finley concludes: "Finley was one of the 'honored seven,'" all graduates of Princeton College, who carried the responsibility of spreading Christianity and Presbyterianism throughout the expanses of the west. That they did in their own way, so very successfully that the whole area was soon called their "Western Zion." Finley died at 1795 at the age of seventy. He left a bequest to Canonsburg Academy, which became Jefferson College and then Washington & Jefferson College.

Finley family history holds that during the American Revolution, he was connected to the house where the Declaration of Independence was initially drafted. Web sources have him as owning the house in which Thomas Jefferson was so uncomfortable that he moved to a boarding house on the edge of town. Other sources state that the home where Jefferson wrote the Declaration was owned and occupied by Jacob Graff, a local bricklayer.

Finley was involved in the border dispute between Virginia and Pennsylvania in furtherance of the interests of Pennsylvania. He made several trips to then Westmoreland County, likely to the area of present Greene and Washington Counties, where he collected signatures on petitions that are now at the National Archives and Records Administration in Washington, DC. Some have speculated that the trips were also spying missions carried out for Benjamin Franklin and the Committee of Safety. In 1795 Finley was elected to the Pennsylvania State Legislature.

The following story was recorded about Finley having a premonition when his third son and fourth child, Ebenezer (1758–1849), barely escaped an Indian attack: "[Ebenezer] came to Fayette county [PA] with his father in 1772 and settled on lands in Redstone township, purchased by his father in 1771. Ebenezer was a daring, hardy lad, and amidst his pioneer surroundings rapidly developed stature and strength. Samuel Finley, who came at the same time, but not a relative, was in charge of the farm, aided by his Negro slaves brought from Maryland. Samuel was drafted for militia duty, but Ebenezer was allowed to go as his substitute. While at Fort Wallace a rider brought news of the approach of Indians, Young Finley was one of the party of twenty men who left the fort, and soon came upon a large body of Indians before whom they retreated, keeping up a running fight. Finley's gun would not go off, and in stopping to fix it he fell behind the others. An Indian with a leveled gun was about to shoot him, when a settler's shot struck him. Finley ran, closely pursued, and soon caught up with the hindmost man, who received the tomahawk, intended for Finley, in the back of his head. Close pressed, but protected by the fire of a comrade, he safely crossed the bridge and reached the fort. A remarkable case of premonition or telepathy, or call it as one may, must here be recorded: During young Finley's running fight and narrow escapes, just mentioned, his father, Rev. James Finley, three hundred miles away, had a strange and undefinable impression that his son was in great danger, but could form no distinct conception of its nature or cause. He fell to his knees and spent a long time in earnest prayer for his son, arising with the comfortable feeling that the danger was past. He made a note of the time, and when a few weeks later he received a letter from his son giving an account of his narrow escapes from death, he saw that the time corresponded exactly with his own strange experience. Rev. Finley was a man of absolute truth—the reader must settle for himself what was the cause of this wireless intercourse between father and son and separated by three hundred miles of space."

== Death ==
James Finley died on January 6, 1795, in Rostraver, Pennsylvania, and is buried at Rehoboth Presbyterian Churchyard.
