= John Blair (pastor) =

Irish American minister (1720-1771)

The Reverend John Blair

Acting President of Princeton University
- In office 1767–1768
- Preceded by: Samuel Finley
- Succeeded by: John Witherspoon

Personal details
- Born: 1720 Ulster, Ireland
- Died: December 8, 1771 (aged 50–51) Wallkill, New York
- Resting place: Goodwill Presbyterian Church Cemetery
- Spouse: Elizabeth (Susan) Blair Durburrow
- Relations: Samuel Blair (brother)
- Education: Log College; Princeton University
- Occupation: Presbyterian minister

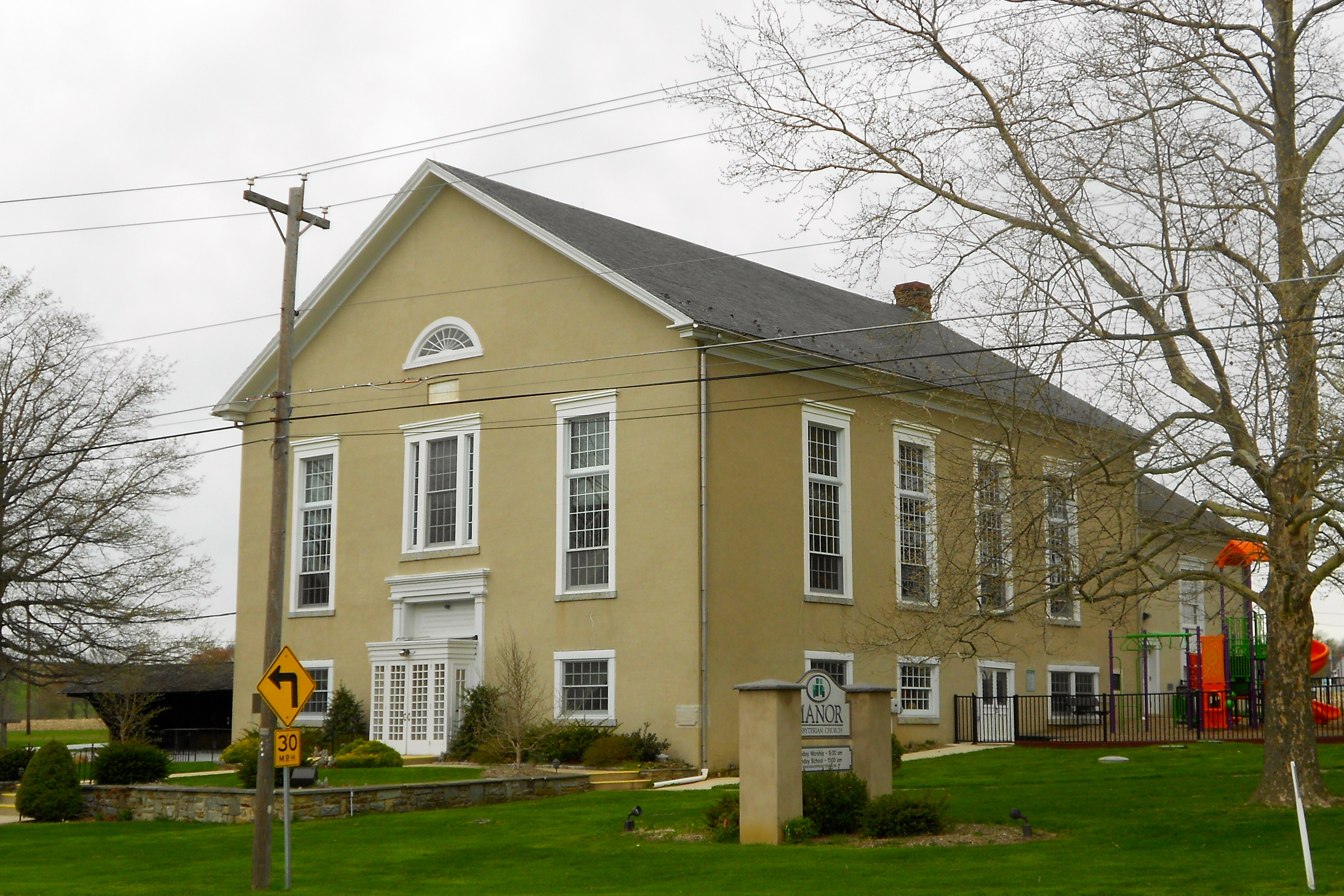
Faggs Manor Presbyterian Church

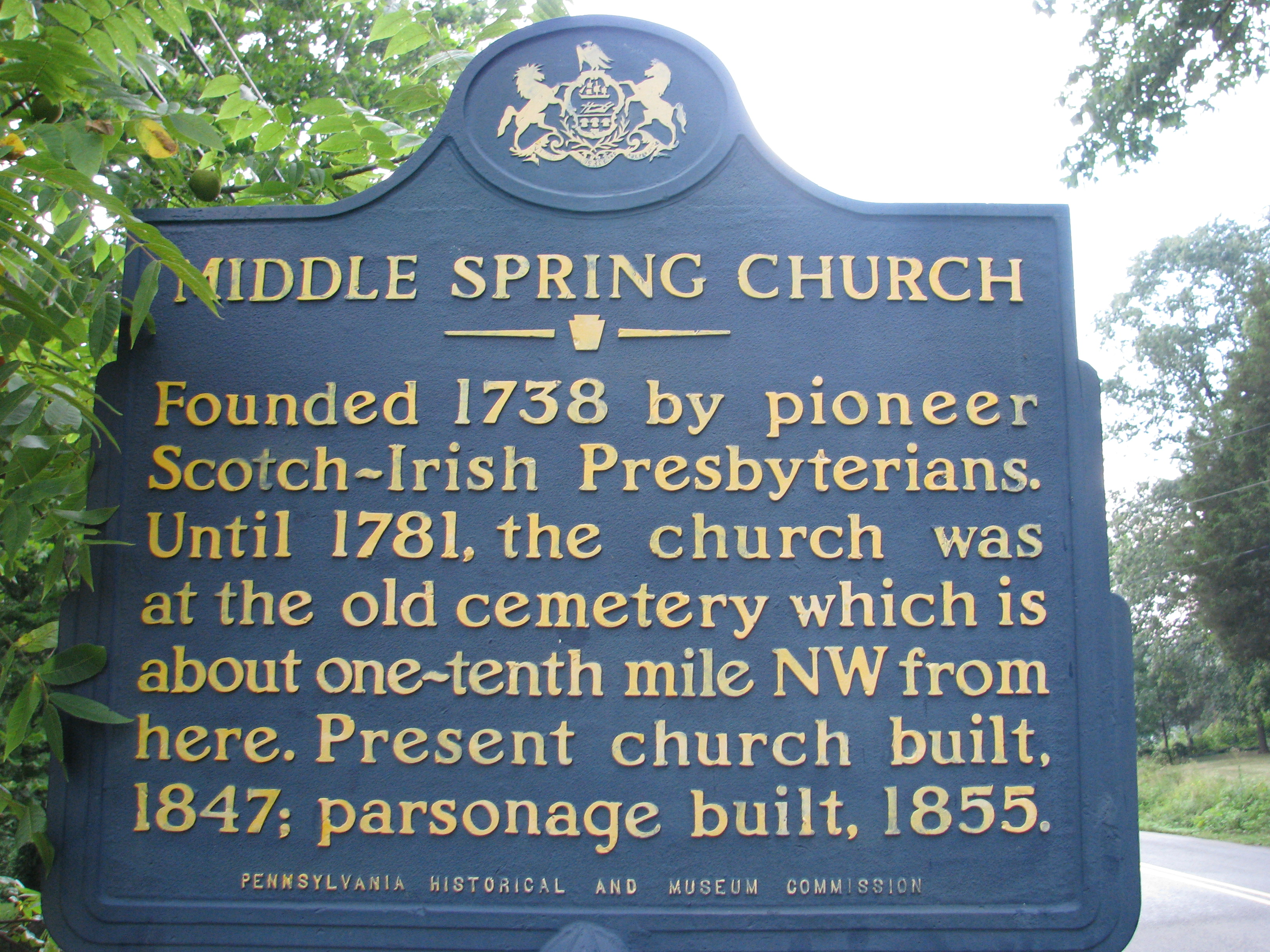
Plaque at Middle Spring Pennsylvania Presbyterian Church

John Blair (1720 – December 8, 1771) was a Presbyterian minister, a Trustee, Professor, and Acting President of Princeton University. His brother Samuel Blair was a leader of the Presbyterian New Light religious movement. His nephew, Samuel Blair was the second Chaplain of the United States House of Representatives.

== Life ==
Blair was born in Ireland in 1720 to William Blair. He immigrated to the colonies in his youth. He was educated in under the Reverend William Tennent at the Log College, the first theological seminary serving Presbyterians in North America located in what is now Warminster, Pennsylvania (then known as Neshaminy). He later received a M.A. from the College of New Jersey in 1760.

He was licensed to preach by the New Side Presbytery of Newcastle. He was ordained December 27, 1742 as pastor of the Hopewell Church at Big Spring in Newville, the Rocky Spring Presbyterian Church in Letterkenny, and at Middle Spring Presbyterian Church in Southampton Township, Cumberland County, Pennsylvania until December 1748. The towns and churches were abandoned due to Indian conflict during the Indian Wars.

He then moved to Londonderry Township where his brother, Samuel Blair had founded the Faggs Manor Presbyterian church and associated classical school. He remained there after his brother's 1751 death and became pastor, and head of the school, until 1767.

He then moved to Princeton, New Jersey where the College of New Jersey (now Princeton University) was located to accept a position of Professor of Theology that was funded by a bequeath of Rev Samuel Finley who died in 1767. He was also appointed Trustee, Vice-President, and acting president until appointed President John Witherspoon was able to arrive.

As the funds to support the Professorship were insufficient, and Witherspoon was able to teach and lead the college, it was agreed that Blair would resign as Professor. He then agreed to be pastor at the Good Will Church in Wallkill, New York where he remained until his death in 1771. He was buried at the cemetery of the church.

== Personal ==
Blair was married to Elizabeth (Susan) Durburrow, a daughter of Philadelphia merchant John Durburrow. They had sons John Durburrow Blair (1759–1823) a 1775 Princeton graduate and theologian, and William Lawrence, a Princeton graduate and Kentucky lawyer, and daughter Rebecca who married William Linn.
