= Laigh Kirk =

The term Laigh Kirk meaning "low church" in the Scots language, was originally applied in contradistinction to the "high church" or main church within a town.

For individual churches with this name, see:

- Laigh Kirk, Kilmarnock
- Laigh Kirk, Paisley
- Collegiate Church of the Blessed Virgin Mary and St Anne, Glasgow
