= Tusculum (Princeton, New Jersey) =

- U.S. National Register of Historic Places
- New Jersey Register of Historic Places
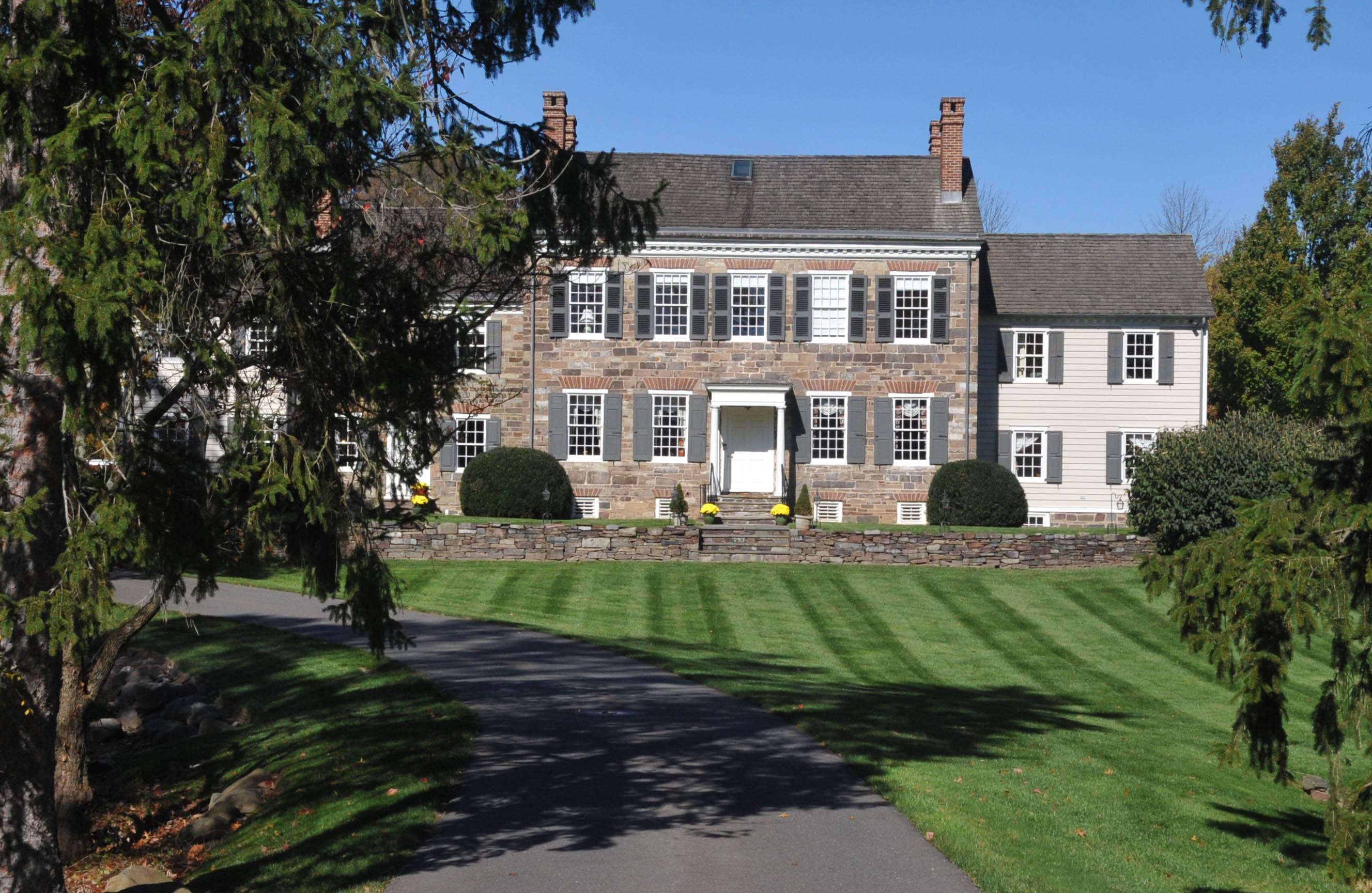

- Location within Mercer County, New Jersey Location within New Jersey Location within the United States
- Location: 166 Cherry Hill Road, Princeton, New Jersey 08540
- Coordinates: 40°21′56.5″N 74°40′16.2″W
- Area: 20 acres (8.1 ha)
- Built: 1773
- NRHP reference No.: 78003171
- NJRHP No.: 1755

Significant dates
- Added to NRHP: January 5, 1978
- Designated NJRHP: April 15, 1977

Tusculum is a country estate on Cherry Hill Road in Princeton, New Jersey, built in 1773 for John Witherspoon, president of Princeton University and signer of the Declaration of Independence. It is named after the Roman town of Tusculum, which was home to the country villa of Marcus Tullius Cicero. In 1793, the property was made available for purchase as a result of John Witherspoon's declining age, and was sought after by many refugees. The property was often visited by George Washington and his wife, Martha, during Witherspoon's tenure as president of Princeton University. In 2013 the home was sold for $5.5 million.

== See also ==
- National Register of Historic Places listings in Mercer County, New Jersey
