= Samuel Blair (pastor) =

Irish American minister (1712–1751)

The Reverend Samuel Blair
- Born: June 14, 1712; Ulster, Ireland
- Died: July 5, 1751 (aged 39); Faggs Manor, Pennsylvania
- Education: Log College
- Occupation: Presbyterian minister
- Children: Samuel Blair
- Parent: Samuel Blair
- Relatives: John Blair (brother)

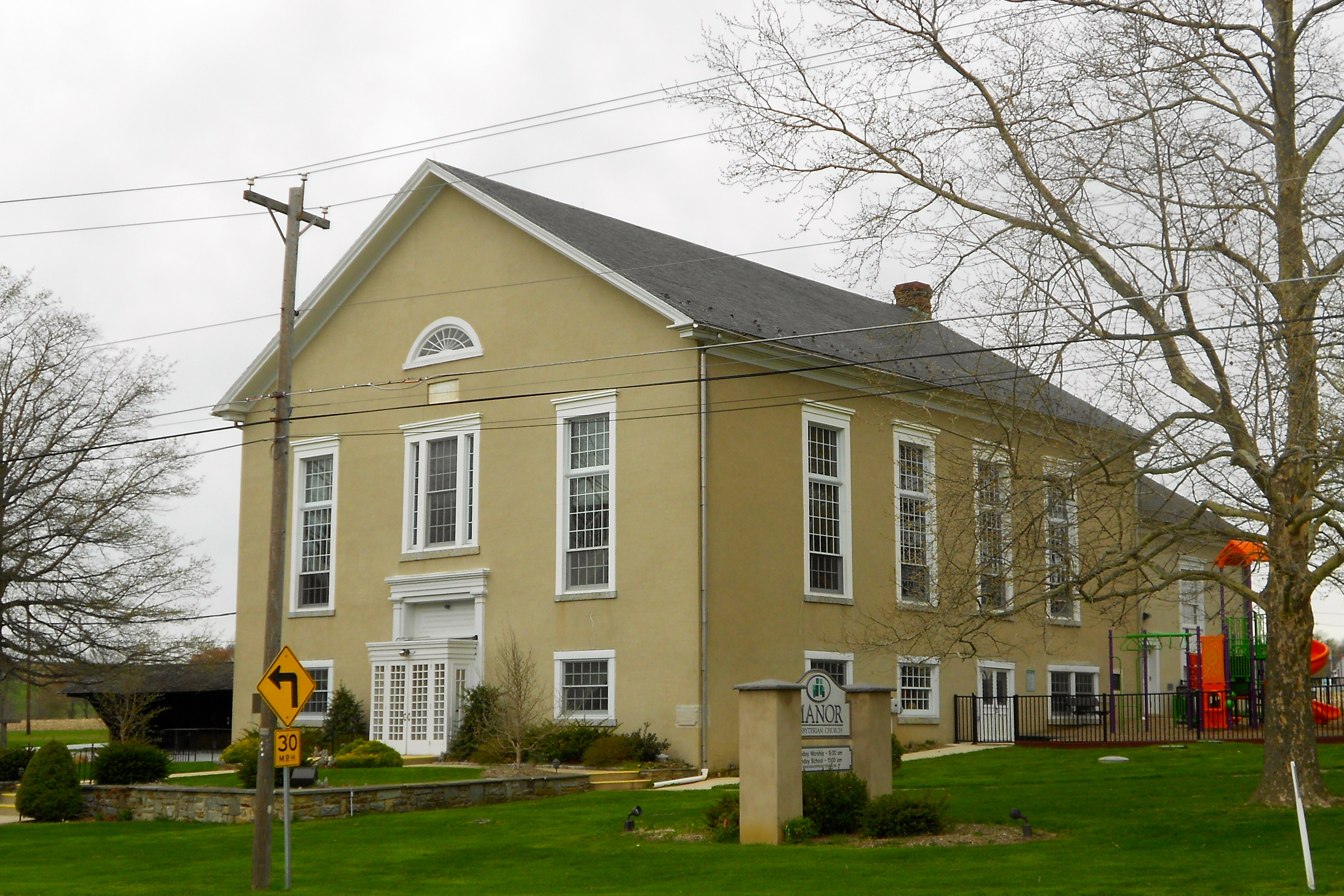
Faggs Manor Presbyterian Church

Samuel Blair (June 14, 1712 – July 5, 1751) was a Presbyterian minister and one of the leaders of the Presbyterian New Light religious movement that swept the North American colonies as part of the First Great Awakening. In 1739, he founded a theology school, at Faggs Manor, near his church in Faggs Manor, Pennsylvania. Blair's son, also named Samuel Blair was born in Faggs Manor, and became the second Chaplain of the United States House of Representatives. The church was rebuilt in 1846 and is now known simply as the Faggs Manor Presbyterian Church.

== Life ==
Blair was born in Ulster, Ireland on June 14, 1712, to William Blair. He immigrated to the colonies in his youth. He was educated in 1730–1735 under Reverend William Tennent at the Log College, the first theological seminary serving Presbyterians in North America located in what is now Warminster, Pennsylvania (then known as Neshaminy). He was licensed to preach by the Presbytery of Philadelphia on November 9, 1733, and ordained in September 1737. In the spring of 1734, he was asked to preach in the New Jersey towns of Millstone, Cranberry, Middletown, and Shrewsbury. He accepted the position in Middletown and Shrewsbury in September of that year. While in New Jersey, he was an original member of the Presbytery of New Brunswick. In June 1735, Blair married Frances van Hook, daughter of Judge Lawrence van Hook and Johanna (Smith) van Hook, who was the daughter of Hendrick Barents Smith of New York City.

In 1739, he was called to Fagg's Manor, Pennsylvania but deferred to the Presbytery which advised him to accept. He returned to Pennsylvania 1739 and founded the Faggs Manor Presbyterian church and associated classical school in Londonderry Township. Many prominent Presbyterian clergy were trained there, including Samuel Davies who became the fourth President of the College of New Jersey (now Princeton University). Among his students was the future Reverends John Rodgers and Samuel Davies.

It was during this time that Blair participated in the "New Side" of the division of the Presbyterian Church in Pennsylvania during the Great Awakening, embracing the revivals.. Blair's sermons, such as "A Perswasive to Repentance" are full of dense expressive figures, balanced argumentation and dialogic interludes. In his revival preaching, Blair aims at evoking negative emotions towards sinful laxness and presenting the Great Awakening as a breakthrough in the history of colonial America.

Blair became ill while traveling to meet with the trustees of the College of New Jersey. He died in Faggs Manor on July 5, 1751, and is buried in the church cemetery.

== Legacy ==
In 1754, his principal writings (seven important sermons), an elegy by Samuel Davies, and eulogy by Reverend Samuel Finley (fifth President of the College of New Jersey) were published in Philadelphia by his brother, John Blair who took over at the Faggs Manor church.
