= John Witherspoon =

American Founding Father and minister (1723–1794)

The Reverend John Witherspoon
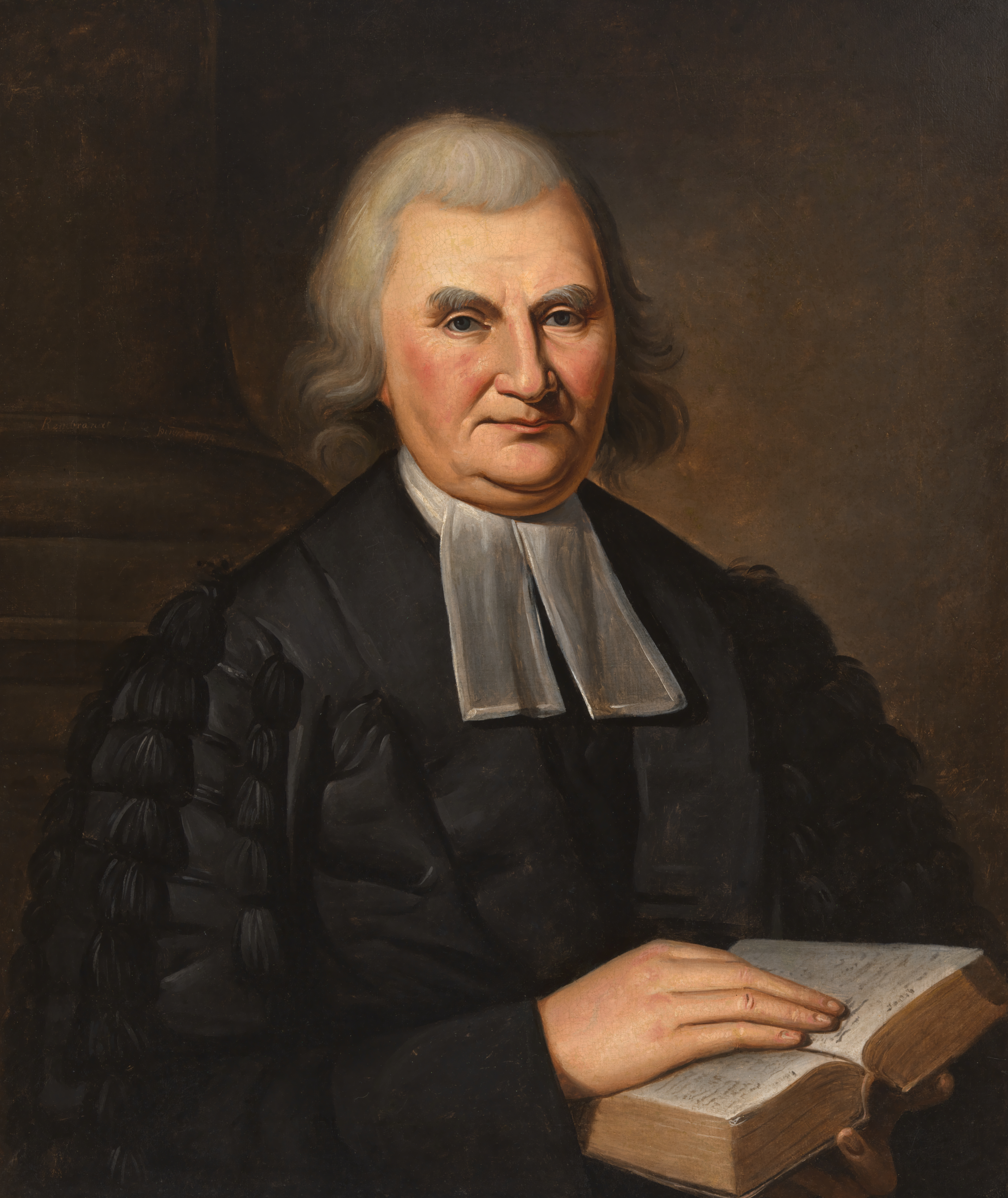
- Portrait by Rembrandt Peale, c. 1794

6th President of Princeton University
- In office 1768–1794
- Preceded by: John Blair (acting)
- Succeeded by: Samuel Stanhope Smith

Personal details
- Born: February 5, 1723 Yester, Gifford, Great Britain
- Died: November 15, 1794 (aged 71) Tusculum, Princeton, New Jersey, U.S.
- Resting place: Princeton Cemetery
- Relatives: John C. Breckinridge (great-grandson)
- Education: University of Edinburgh (MA); University of St Andrews (D.D(Hon.))
- Occupation: Clergyman - Theologian - Academic

John Witherspoon (February 5, 1723 – November 15, 1794) was a Scottish-American Presbyterian minister, educator, farmer, and a Founding Father of the United States. Along with Christianity, Witherspoon also embraced various concepts of Scottish common sense realism, and while president of the College of New Jersey (1768–1794; now Princeton University) became an influential figure in the development of the United States' national character. Politically active, Witherspoon was a delegate from New Jersey to the Second Continental Congress and a signatory to the July 4, 1776, Declaration of Independence. He was the only active clergyman and the only college president to sign the Declaration.

Later, he signed the Articles of Confederation and supported ratification of the Constitution of the United States. In 1789 he was convening moderator of the First General Assembly of the Presbyterian Church in the United States of America. As one of the first national leaders of American Presbyterianism, he promoted theological and civic ideas adjacent to John Calvin, John Knox, and Samuel Rutherford, particularly the concept that resistance to tyranny is obedience to God. was born in Yester, Scotland, documented in the Old Parish Register as the eldest child of the Reverend James Alexander Witherspoon and Anne Walker, a descendant of John Welsh of Ayr and John Knox. This latter claim of Knox descent though ancient in origin is long disputed and without primary documentation. He attended the Haddington Grammar School and obtained a Master of Arts from the University of Edinburgh in 1739. He remained at the university to study divinity. In 1764, he was awarded an honorary doctoral degree in divinity by the University of St Andrews.

Witherspoon was a staunch Protestant, nationalist, and supporter of republicanism. Consequently, he was opposed to the Roman Catholic Legitimist Jacobite rising of 1745–46. Following the Jacobite victory at the Battle of Falkirk, he was briefly imprisoned at Doune Castle, which had a long-term effect on his health.

He became a Church of Scotland (Presbyterian) minister at Beith, Ayrshire (1745–1758), where he married Elizabeth Montgomery of Craighouse. They had ten children, with five surviving to adulthood.

From 1758 to 1768, he was minister of the Laigh Kirk, Paisley (Low Kirk). Witherspoon became prominent within the Church as an Evangelical opponent of the Moderate Party. During his two pastorates he wrote three well-known works on theology, notably the satire "Ecclesiastical Characteristics" (1753) about the Inverkeithing Case of 1752, which opposed the philosophical influence of Francis Hutcheson.

== Princeton ==
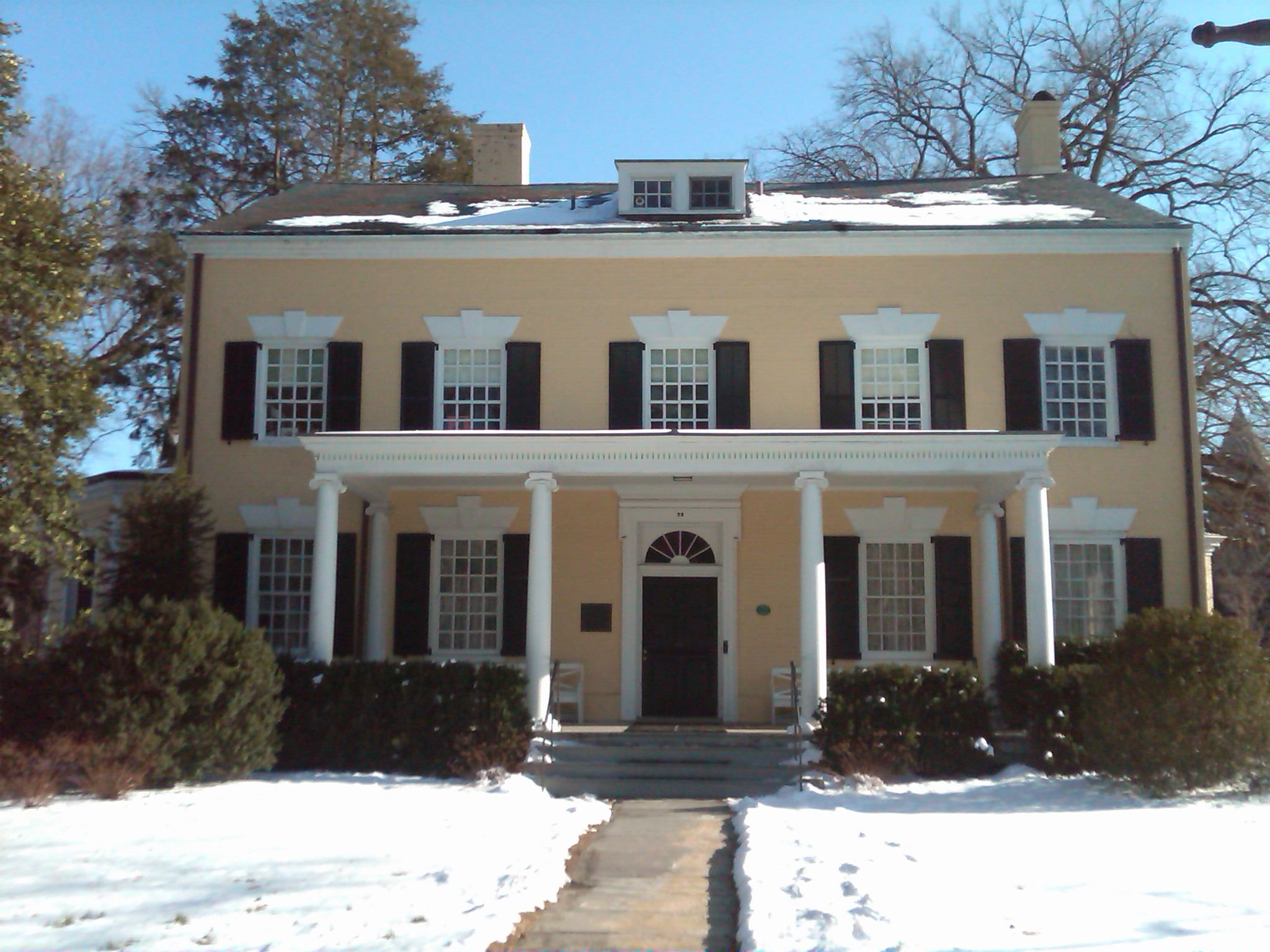
The President's House in Princeton, New Jersey. Completed in 1756, Witherspoon lived here from 1768 to 1779; it is a U.S. National Historic Landmark.

At the urging of Benjamin Rush and Richard Stockton, whom he met in Paisley, Witherspoon finally accepted their renewed invitation (having turned one down in 1766) to become president and head professor of the small Presbyterian College of New Jersey in Princeton. Thus, Witherspoon and his family emigrated to New Jersey in 1768.

At the age of 45, he became the sixth president of the college, later known as Princeton University. Upon his arrival, Witherspoon found the school in debt, with weak instruction, and a library collection which clearly failed to meet student needs. He immediately began fund-raising—locally and back home in Scotland—added three hundred of his own books to the library, and began purchasing scientific equipment including the Rittenhouse orrery, many maps, and a terrestrial globe. Witherspoon instituted numerous reforms, including modeling the syllabus and university structure after that used at the University of Edinburgh and other Scottish universities. He also firmed up entrance requirements, which helped the school compete with Harvard and Yale for scholars.

Witherspoon personally taught courses in eloquence or belles lettres, chronology (history), and divinity. However, none was more important than moral philosophy (a required course). An advocate of natural law within a Christian and republican cosmology, Witherspoon considered moral philosophy vital for ministers, lawyers, and those holding positions in government (magistrates). Firm but good-humored in his leadership, Witherspoon was very popular among both faculty and students.

Witherspoon had been a prominent evangelical Presbyterian minister in Scotland before accepting the Princeton position. As the college's primary occupation at the time was training ministers, Witherspoon became a major leader of the early Presbyterian Church in America. He helped organize Nassau Presbyterian Church in Princeton, New Jersey.

Nonetheless, Witherspoon transformed a college designed predominantly to train clergymen into a school that would equip the leaders of a new country. Students who later played prominent roles in the new nation's development included James Madison, Aaron Burr, Philip Freneau, William Bradford, and Hugh Henry Brackenridge. From among his students came 37 judges (three of whom became justices of the U.S. Supreme Court); 10 Cabinet officers; 12 members of the Continental Congress, 28 U.S. Senators, and 49 U.S. Congressmen.

Although Witherspoon can be heavily credited in the expansion and progression of the university, his ownership ties to the enslavement of Black people in America have caused for an internal Princeton petition to the CPUC Committee on Naming at Princeton University and President Eisgruber for the removal of his statue that currently stands in Firestone Plaza on campus. The statue was originally installed in 2001. As of Fall 2022, the petition has garnered over 250 signatures in support of removing the statue on the basis that it is a distraction to the university's mission and makes community members uncomfortable because of Witherspoon's racist history. The petitions suggests replacing the statue with "an informational plaque which details both the positive and negative aspects of Witherspoon's legacy."

== Revolutionary War ==
In Declaration of Independence by John Trumbull (1818), Witherspoon is the second seated figure from the (viewer's) right among those shown in the background facing the large table.

Long wary of the power of the British Crown, Witherspoon saw the growing centralization of government, progressive ideology of colonial authorities, and establishment of episcopacy authority as a threat to the liberties of the colonies. Of particular interest to Witherspoon was the Crown's growing interference in the local and colonial affairs which previously had been the prerogatives and rights of the American authorities. When the Crown began to give additional authority to its appointed episcopacy over church affairs, British authorities hit a nerve in the Presbyterian Scot, who saw such events in the same lens as his Scottish Covenanters. Soon, Witherspoon came to support the American Revolution, joining the New Jersey Committee of Correspondence and Safety in early 1774. His 1776 sermon "The Dominion of Providence over the Passions of Men" was published in many editions, and he was elected to the Continental Congress as part of the New Jersey delegation. In Congress, he was appointed congressional chaplain, and in July 1776, he voted to adopt the Virginia Resolution for Independence. In answer to an objection that the country was not yet ready for independence, according to tradition he replied that it "was not only ripe for the measure, but in danger of rotting for the want of it."

Witherspoon served in Congress from June 1776 until November 1782 and became one of its most influential members and a workhorse of prodigious energy. He served on over 100 committees, most notably the sitting committees, the board of peace and the committee on public correspondence or common affairs. He spoke often in concurrence; helped draft the Articles of Confederation; helped organize the executive departments; played a major role in shaping public policy; and drew up the instructions for the peace commissioners. He fought against the flood of paper money and opposed the issuance of bonds without provision for their amortization. "No business can be done, some say, because money is scarce", he wrote. He also served twice in the New Jersey Legislature and strongly supported the adoption of the United States Constitution during the New Jersey ratification debates.

In November 1777, as British forces neared, Witherspoon closed and evacuated the College of New Jersey. The main building, Nassau Hall, was badly damaged, and his papers and personal notes were lost. Witherspoon was responsible for its reconstruction after the war, which caused him great personal and financial difficulty. In 1780 he was elected to a one-year term in the New Jersey Legislative Council representing Somerset County, and was a candidate for Congress in 1789 and 1791. At age 68, he married a 24-year-old widow, with whom he had two more children.

== Death and burial ==
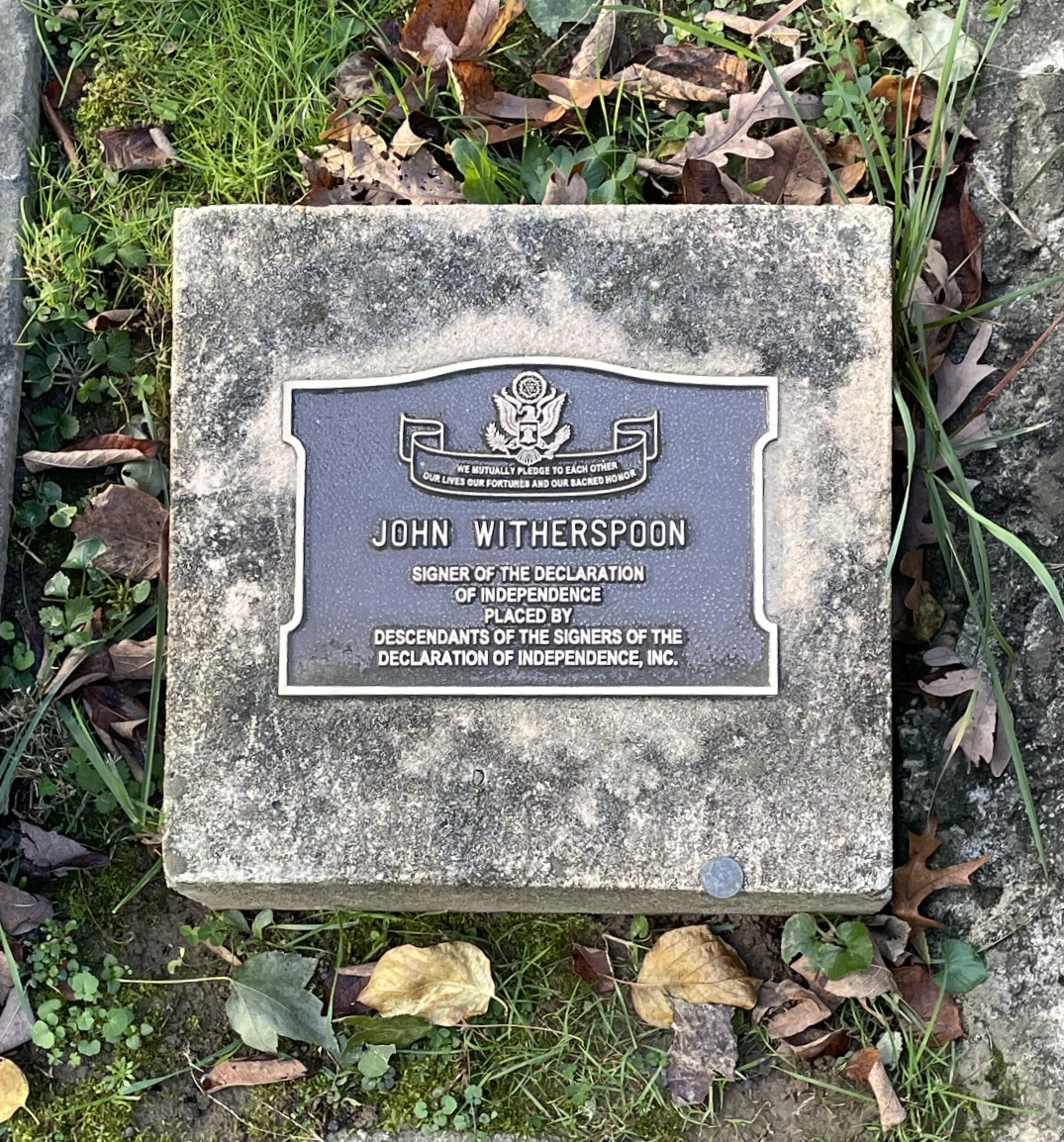
Witherspoon's grave at Princeton Cemetery

Witherspoon suffered eye injuries and was blind by 1792. He died in 1794 on his farm Tusculum, just outside Princeton, and is buried along Presidents Row in Princeton Cemetery. A sermon authored by Reverend John Rodgers was read at Witherspoon's funeral.

== Family ==
Witherspoon married Elizabeth Montgomery on 14 August 1748 documented in the old parish register in Beith, North Ayrshire. They were both from the parish. They had a total of 10 children, only five of whom survived to accompany their parents to America. James, the eldest, graduated from Princeton in 1770 and joined the Continental Army as an aide to General Francis Nash, with the rank of major and was killed at the Battle of Germantown on October 4, 1777. The next oldest son, John, graduated from Princeton in 1779, practiced medicine in South Carolina, and was lost at sea in 1795. David, the youngest son, graduated the same year as his brother John, married the widow of Abner Nash, and practiced law in New Bern, North Carolina. Anna, the eldest daughter, married the Reverend Samuel Smith on June 28, 1775. The Reverend Samuel Smith succeeded Dr. Witherspoon as president of Princeton in 1795. Frances, the youngest daughter, married Dr. David Ramsay, a delegate from South Carolina to the Continental Congress, on March 18, 1763.

== Philosophy ==
John Witherspoon Statue, Paisley, Scotland by Alexander Stoddart

According to Herbert Hovenkamp, Witherspoon's most lasting contribution was the initiation of the Scottish common sense realism, which he had learned by reading Thomas Reid and two of his expounders Dugald Stewart and James Beattie.

At the College of New Jersey, Witherspoon revised the moral philosophy curriculum, strengthened the college's commitment to natural philosophy, and positioned Princeton in the larger transatlantic world of the republic of letters. Witherspoon was a proponent of Christian values, his common sense approach to the public morality of civil magistrates was influenced by the ethics of Scottish philosophers Francis Hutcheson and Reid rather than Jonathan Edwards. In regard to civil magistrates, Witherspoon thus believed moral judgment should be pursued as a science. He held to old concepts from the Roman Republic of virtuous leadership by civil magistrates, but he also regularly recommended that his students read such modern philosophers as Machiavelli, Montesquieu, and David Hume, even though he disapproved of Hume's "infidel" stance on religion.

Virtue, he argued, could be deduced through the development of the moral sense, an ethical compass instilled by God in all human beings and developed through religious education (Reid) or civil sociability (Hutcheson). Witherspoon saw morality as having two distinct components: spiritual and temporal. Civil government owed more to the latter than the former in Witherspoon's Presbyterian doctrine. Thus, public morality owed more to the natural moral laws of the Enlightenment than to revealed Christianity.

In his lectures on moral philosophy at Princeton, required of all juniors and seniors, Witherspoon argued for the revolutionary right of resistance and recommended checks and balances within government. He made a profound impression on his student James Madison, whose suggestions for the United States Constitution followed both Witherspoon's and Hume's ideas. The historian Douglass Adair writes, "The syllabus of Witherspoon's lectures . . . explains the conversion of the young Virginian to the philosophy of the Enlightenment."

Witherspoon accepted the impossibility of maintaining public morality or virtue in the citizenry without an effective religion. In this sense, the temporal principles of morality required a religious component which derived its authority from the spiritual. Therefore, public religion was a vital necessity in maintaining the public morals. However, in this framework, non-Christian societies could have virtue, which, by his definition, could be found in natural law. Witherspoon, in accordance with the Scottish moral sense philosophy, taught that all human beings, Christian or otherwise, could be virtuous, but he was nonetheless committed to Christianity as the only route to personal salvation.

Witherspoon owned slaves and lectured against the abolition of slavery.

However, in his "Lectures on Moral Philosophy", Dr. Witherspoon advocated for the humane treatment of laborers and servants (including slaves), stating:

This relation is first generated by the difference which God hath permitted to take place between man and man. Some are superior to others in mental powers and intellectual improvement—some by the great increase of their property through their own, or their predecessors industry, and some make it their choice, finding they cannot live otherwise better, to let out their labor to others for hire.

Let us shortly consider (1.) How far this subjection extends. (2.) The duties on each side. As to the first it seems to be only that the master has a right to the labors and ingenuity of the servant for a limited time, or at most for life. He can have no right either to take away life, or to make it insupportable by excessive labor. The servant therefore retains all his other natural rights. The practice of ancient nations, of making their prisoners of war slaves, was altogether unjust and barbarous; for though we could suppose that those who were the causes of an unjust war deserved to be made slaves; yet this could not be the case of all who fought on their side; besides the doing so in one instance would authorize the doing it in any other; and those who fought in defense of their country, when unjustly invaded, might be taken as well as others. The practice was also impolitic, as slaves never are so good or faithful servants, as those who become so for a limited time by consent.

— Witherspoon, John (1912). Lectures on Moral Philosophy. Princeton, N.J.: Princeton University Press. pp. 85–86.

The settled opinion among the American founding fathers, including Dr. Witherspoon, was that slavery would eventually disappear naturally within a generation. For this reason, Rev. Witherspoon advocated for "gradual emancipation" of slaves.

In this connection it may be noted that in 1790 President Witherspoon, while a member of the New Jersey Legislature, was chairman of a committee on the abolition of slavery in the state, and brought in a report advising no action, on the ground that the law already forbade the importation of slaves and encouraged voluntary manumission. He suggested, however, that the state might enact a law that all slaves born after its passage should be free at a certain age—e.g., 28 years, as in Pennsylvania, although in his optimistic opinion the state of society in America and the progress of the idea of universal liberty gave little reason to believe that there would be any slaves at all in America in 28 years' time, and precipitation therefore might do more harm than good.

— Witherspoon, John (1912). Lectures on Moral Philosophy. Princeton, N.J.: Princeton University Press. p. 74.

== Legacy ==
=== Statues ===
- Princeton University, Princeton, New Jersey
- Presbyterian Historical Society, Philadelphia
- University of the West of Scotland, Paisley, Scotland, United Kingdom
- Doctor John Witherspoon, Connecticut Avenue and N Street, N.W., near Dupont Circle, Washington, D.C.

=== Buildings ===
- Witherspoon Hall, Princeton University, Princeton, New Jersey
- Witherspoon Building, in the Market East neighborhood of Philadelphia
- The former Witherspoon Street School for Colored Children, Princeton, New Jersey
- The former John Witherspoon Middle School, Princeton, New Jersey. In August 2021, the Princeton School Board voted to remove John Witherspoon's name from the local public middle school due to Witherspoon's history as a slave owner who opposed abolition. The Board had previously voted not to make the change, but reversed itself after local residents submitted a petition with more than 1,500 signatures and input gathered at two public forums, temporarily changing the name to the Princeton Unified Middle School until a permanent new name is identified.

=== Memberships ===
Witherspoon was elected to the American Philosophical Society in 1789

=== Other ===
- John Witherspoon College, a non-denominational Christian liberal arts college in Rapid City, South Dakota
- Witherspoon Institute, a research center in Princeton, New Jersey
- Witherspoon Society, an organization of laypeople within the Presbyterian Church (USA) merged with Voices of Sophia in 2008 to form Presbyterian Voices for Justice, which subsequently closed in 2020.
- Witherspoon Street, in: Princeton, New Jersey; Louisville, Kentucky; and Paisley, Scotland
- SS John Witherspoon, a Liberty ship class United States Merchant Marine ship during World War II; participated in an Allied convoy, code named PQ 17, and was sunk in the Barents Sea by the German submarine U-255 on July 6, 1942
- Portrayed in the musical 1776, about the debates over and eventual adoption of the Declaration of Independence, by Edmund Lyndeck in the 1969 stage play and by James Noble in the 1972 film
- Witherspoon Wing; a prominent section of the set of House MD.

== See also ==
- Memorial to the 56 Signers of the Declaration of Independence

Academic offices
Preceded by Samuel Finley	President of the College of New Jersey; 1768–1794	Succeeded by Samuel Stanhope Smith
Religious titles
New office	Convening Moderator of the General Assembly of the Presbyterian Church in the United States of America; 1789	Succeeded by John Rodgers
