= Laigh Kirk, Paisley =

Paisley Laigh Kirk (Now in Union to form Stow Brae Kirk)
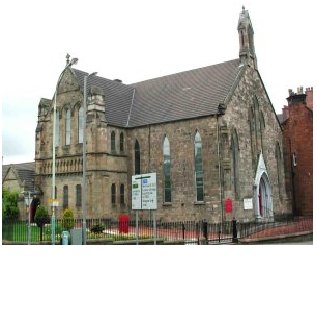
- Paisley Laigh Kirk (Now in Union to form Stow Brae Kirk)
- 55.841°N 4.425°W
- Country: Scotland
- Denomination: Church of Scotland
- Churchmanship: Presbyterian
- Website: The Laigh Kirk Website

History
- Founded: 1738

The Laigh Kirk, Paisley was a congregation of the Church of Scotland and the original Burgh church of Paisley.

== History ==
The Laigh Kirk was founded in August 1738 by the Burgh of Paisley and by the Presbytery of Paisley as the parish church for the whole burgh, in response to the burgeoning population of Paisley and the dilapidated state of Paisley Abbey which, at that time, was outside of the Burgh limits on the opposite (western) bank of the River Cart.

The Burgh and town of Paisley were formally disjoined as a parish from the old Parish of Paisley, which had served a large geographic area, at the August 1738 meeting of Paisley Presbytery, with the cover page of the first minute book of the church declaring it to be a "record of the Parish of the Burgh of Paisley".

In 1756 and again in 1781, as a result of Paisley's continued expansion, the parish was sub-divided with the creation of the High Kirk and the Middle Kirk, respectively. These three worked together under the auspices of the "Paisley Joint Session."

The original Laigh Kirk building was located in New Street. In 1820, due to the ever growing size of its congregation, the Laigh Kirk moved to a new, much larger building on George Street.

The Laigh Kirk continued to grow and expand, as did Paisley; and to meet these demands a new congregation was seeded by the Laigh Kirk on Neilston Road, the South Church. Beginning its life as a Chapel of Ease under the Kirk Session of the Laigh Kirk, the events of the Disruption of 1843 saw this sister congregation leave the Church of Scotland and join the new Free Church of Scotland, as the Free South Church. It would be over 140 years before these two halves became whole again, with the reunion of the two congregations (by this time known as St George's Low and St Andrew's) in 1985. The name Laigh Kirk was re-established in Paisley and served the Parish from its Causeyside Street base, the building originally built as the Free South Church of Scotland.

On Thursday 6 January 2011, The Laigh Kirk united with the congregation of the former Castlehead Church of Scotland. The new congregation is called Stow Brae Kirk, and meets for worship in the former Laigh Kirk buildings on Causeyside Street.

== Laigh Kirk and the formation of the Scottish Poor Laws ==
In the early 19th century, following a collapse in the Paisley cotton trade, the Kirk Session of the Laigh and the burgh clashed over the right to poor relief under the existing Scottish Poor Laws. In particular, over the classification of those who were traditionally eligible - the church found it could only fund those physically unable to work and not the able-bodied unemployed. The financial crisis that followed for the church and the burgh, and the need for government intervention, was to play a large part in the redrawing of the existing Poor Laws.

The then minister, Rev Robert Burns, was to become an influential figure in the campaign for alleviation of the suffering of the urban poor. Most notably, his ‘Historical Dissertations on the Law and Practice of Great Britain, and particularly of Scotland with regard to the Poor’, would be much cited by those who took up the cause. He would even be part of four deputations that visited London to petition Parliament on the subject.

== Buildings ==
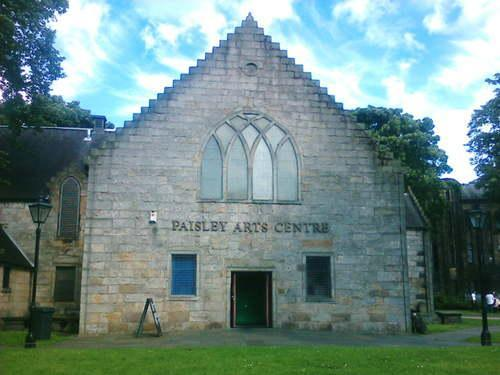
Original Laigh Kirk building

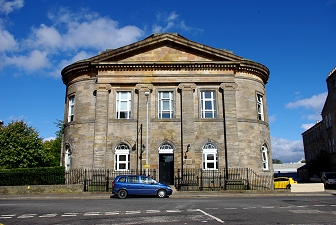
St George's Low, Paisley

Free South, Paisley

The original New Street building was converted to an Arts centre in the 1980s and is still in use as the Paisley Arts Centre. In the late 1980s, the St George's (Low) building was converted into the St George's Court flats, with the facade being completely retained and the interior completely remodelled.

== Ministers ==
- A notable minister was the Rev John Witherspoon, (15 February 1723 – 15 November 1794). He later emigrated to the America and was a signatory of the United States Declaration of Independence as a representative of New Jersey.
- Rev Robert Burns, social reformer and activist.
- The last minister of the Laigh Kirk was the Rev David Thom (Mr Thom is the minister of the united congregation of Stow Brae Kirk )
