= Nathaniel Bartlett =

Pastor in Connecticut during American Revolutionary War

Nathaniel Bartlett (April 22, 1727 – January 11, 1810), pastor of the Congregational Church of Redding, Connecticut, during the period 1753–1810, was one of the numerous Colonial American clergymen who played an active role during the American Revolution. He was among many such American patriots living in British Colonial America on the eve of the Revolutionary War, who found themselves in circumstances which compelled them to make a personal contribution to the unfolding drama of one of history's most momentous events.

== Early life, education, and career path ==
Bartlett was born in North Guilford, New Haven County, Connecticut, the son of Daniel Jr. (1688–1769) and Ann (Collins) (1692–1745) Bartlett. He attended Yale and studied theology, graduating with an M.A. Degree in the Class of 1749. He became a Congregational minister, and soon after he was licensed to preach, the Hartford South Association recommended him to the Kensington Society – the Congregational Church in Farmington, Connecticut – as a pastoral candidate. The church at Farmington declined to offer him the pastorate, but from January to April of 1753, he preached on a trial basis at the Congregational Church of Redding, Fairfield County, Connecticut, to allow the congregation to evaluate his suitability for a position there. Between 1750 and 1753, the Redding church had taken four preachers under consideration as pastoral candidates. The first three were rejected, and they finally settled on Bartlett, being favorably disposed to his installation as their minister.

In April of 1753, the Redding church called him to fill the opening for the full time pastoral position they had available. He was subsequently ordained by the Fairfield East Consociation on May 23, 1753. Per the Redding Church Records of that date, the pastors who assisted in his ordination were as follows: "The Rev. Mr. (Eben) White of Danbury gave the opening prayer – the Rev. Mr. (Jonathan) Todd of East Guilford preached the sermon – the Rev. Mr. (Elisha) Kent (unchurched at that time) gave the ordaining prayer – the Rev. Mr. (Jedediah) Mills of Ripston gave the charge – the Rev. Mr. (David) Judson of Newtown gave the right hand of fellowship – the Rev. Mr. (Jonathan) Ingersoll of Ridgefield gave the closing prayer". Bartlett served at Redding for the next 57 years – i.e. until near his death in 1810 – thought to be the longest continuous pastorate in the history of the early New England churches up to that time. (The record was eventually lost, however, to the Rev. Samuel Nott, who served at Franklin, Connecticut 1782–1852, an unbelievable 70 years). Bartlett succeeded the first minister at Redding, Rev. Nathaniel Hunn – and was in turn succeeded by the Rev. Daniel Crocker. Bartlett's youngest son, Rev. Jonathan Bartlett (1764–1858) served as co-pastor with his father for a few years, but resigned due to ill health prior to his father's death. The Rev. Daniel Crocker likewise served as co-pastor for a few months, following Bartlett's March 22, 1809 petition to the church board, that he be released from active service due to old age and infirmity.

== The Revolutionary War ==
During the Revolutionary War, Bartlett was consistently a firebrand for the Colonial American cause, as were many Congregational ministers who thundered anti-British tirades from their pulpits week after week during the conflict. The British referred to pro-independence pastors as the “Black Robed Regiment”, because of the black robes they wore in the pulpit, in conjunction with their propaganda campaign which made a significant contribution to the American war effort. So outspoken was Bartlett in his views, that the local Tories (loyalists) who were numerous in western Connecticut threatened to hang him if they could catch him. Due to these frequent and credible threats to his life, Bartlett was obligated to make his parochial rounds with a loaded musket in hand, as well as his Bible. He allowed war provisions to be stored in his home, including gunpowder in a bin which he constructed in the garret (attic) of his house, (discovered years later by his son the Rev. Jonathan Bartlett), which was quite dangerous – both politically and otherwise.

The atmosphere in Redding must have been very volatile throughout the war, as the local Episcopalians with their rector the Rev. John Beach were generally loyalists while the Congregationalists with their pastor Bartlett were generally rebels. Those of the Tory persuasion were sufficient in numbers to form themselves into the "Redding Loyalist Association", to which the Rev. John Beach lent his continuing support from the pulpit. The "Redding Loyalist Association" published a list of resolutions in support of the British Government, a document which was signed by 141 male residents (some of whom were minors), of whom 73 were from Redding, with the rest being from outlying areas. With the village of Redding being thus split along political and religious denominational lines, there must have been considerable animosity between neighbors in so small a community, and no doubt many families experienced divided loyalties as well. The Bartlett family, however, was firmly united in support of the American cause.

In addition to verbal assaults on the enemy, Bartlett supported the war effort by officiating as Military Chaplain to Continental Army General Israel Putnam's Division during their encampment in Redding the winter of 1778/79. Bartlett’s two oldest sons served in the Continental Army: Russell Bartlett (1754–1828) who enlisted in Danbury, Connecticut in the 6th Company of the 5th Regiment of the Connecticut Line, Capt. Noble Benedict's Company, and Daniel Collins Bartlett (1757–1837) who enlisted in Redding, Connecticut in the 10th Company of the 5th Regiment of the Connecticut Line, Capt. Zalmon Read's Company. One anecdote told about Bartlett, was that on a Sunday morning at the outbreak of the Revolution, he brought his own sword, newly ground, and presented it to his second son Daniel Collins Bartlett, instructing him to go and defend his country.

== Domestic life ==
The year 1753 was an important one for the Bartlett family. In addition to becoming pastor at Redding, shortly thereafter on June 13 Bartlett married Eunice Russell (1725–1810), eldest daughter of Jonathan (1700–1774) and Eunice (Barker) (1703–1786) Russell of Branford, New Haven County Connecticut. Eunice (Russell) Bartlett's uncle, the Rev. Samuel Russell Jr., was pastor at the Congregational Church of North Guilford during the time Bartlett was growing up there. Her first cousin, Thomas Russell, was born the same year as Bartlett and also graduated from Yale in the Class of 1749. It is assumed therefore, that Nathaniel and Eunice became acquainted through the intermediary of these close relatives of hers in North Guilford. To the union of Nathaniel and Eunice (Russell) Bartlett, were born six known children: Russell b 1754, Daniel Collins b 1757, Anne b 1759, Eunice b 1761, Jonathan b 1764, and Lucretia b 1768, all born in Redding.

Also in the busy year 1753, Nathaniel and Eunice began construction of a New England salt-box style house in Redding, on 20 acres of land donated by the church as part of the settlement arrangements for his pastorate, being a common practice of the era. Per the Redding Church Records, the property was deeded over to Bartlett on June 8, 1753, by Deacon Lemuel Sanford. Now identified as the Jonathan B. Sanford House in the Survey of Historic Buildings in the Library of Congress, it is still in use today as a single family residence. (The original land holding is intact as well, as the Internet currently shows the property lot size as 21.59 acres). In its external appearance, it remains virtually unchanged from how it must originally have looked, except for a wing added on to the east in 1847, and a patio out back. It is located on 10 Cross Highway, just off Route # 107 in Redding Center, directly across from the "Heritage House" senior center- near the site of the original Congregational Church, which burned down on May 4, 1942. After the deaths of Nathaniel and Eunice in 1810, the house was inherited by their youngest son, the Rev. Jonathan Bartlett, the only son who remained in Connecticut. (Russell Bartlett was living in Cooperstown, Otsego County, New York, and Daniel Collins Bartlett was living in Amenia, Dutchess County, New York at the time of their parents’ deaths). Upon his death in 1858, the Rev. Jonathan Bartlett who died childless, in turn passed the house down to his nephew by marriage and second cousin on the maternal side, Lemuel Sanford IV. The Bartlett / Sanford House remained in the Sanford family until finally being sold out of the family on May 21, 1969.

== Dual career ==
Bartlett was a teacher as well as a minister, which was a common practice in that era, preparing many young men for higher education. His most noted pupil was the poet Joel Barlow, one of the "Hartford Wits". While attending the village school which Bartlett taught in Redding, Joel Barlow composed poetry in his free time. Recognizing his talent, Bartlett showed the boy's poems to Joel's father, recommending that a youth with such promise should be prepared for college. Joel's father agreed, and Joel was tutored by Bartlett 1772–1773. Joel Barlow went on to write numerous poems, which were famous in their day. Joel went to France during the French Revolution, and died during Napoleon's disastrous retreat from Russia while serving with the French Army as a special envoy from President James Madison.

== Death ==
Bartlett died in Redding, Connecticut, on January 11, 1810. His widow survived him by only a few months, dying on August 2 of that same year. Bartlett was said to be a fine scholar and an eloquent preacher, who tended to the spiritual and temporal needs of his flock until very near the end of his long productive life. Upon his death, an inventory of his estate revealed assets of around $5,000.00 in value, including a small library of some 24 volumes and 85 pamphlets.

== Bibliography ==
- Banks, Lawrence (1958), 225th Anniversary of the First Church of Christ Congregational in Redding, Connecticut – A Brief History – 1733–1958, Redding church
- Connecticut Deaths and Burials, 1772–1934
- Cubberly, Ellwood P (1919), Interpretation of American Educational History, Boston: Houghton Mifflin Co
- Davidson, Philip (1941), Propaganda and the American Revolution 1763–1783, New York: W.W. Norton Co
- Dexter, Franklin B (1896), Biographical sketches of the Graduates of Yale College with Annals of the College History, vol. II (May, 1745 – May, 1763), New York: Henry Holt & Co
- Grumman, William Edgar (1904), The Revolutionary Soldiers of Redding, Connecticut, Hartford: Lockwood & Brainard
- Powers, William H. (1929), Johnson, Allen (ed.), "Dictionary of American Biography", Science, 70 (1805), New York: Charles Scribner's Sons: 121–122, Bibcode:1929Sci....70..121P, doi:10.1126/science.70.1805.121, PMID 17813847
- Kingsley, William L (1861), Contributions to the Ecclesiastical History of Connecticut, New Haven: William L. Kingsley
- Litz, A. Walton (ed.), American Writers – A Collection of Literary Biographies, vol. Supplement II, Part I, New York: Charles Scribner's Sons
- Redding Congregational Church Records (microfilm at the Connecticut State Library in Hartford), 23 May 1753
- Redding Congregational Church Records, 22 March 1809
- Roberts, Gary Boyd, ed. (1983), "Genealogies of Connecticut Families", New England Historical & Genealogical Register, vol. I, also Connecticut Births and Christenings, 1649–1906, Baltimore: Genealogical Publishing
- Russell, Gurdon W (1910), Welles, Edwin S (ed.), An Account of Some of the Descendants of John Russell the Emigrant, Hartford, Connecticut: The Case, Lockwood & Brainard Company
- Taylor, Robert J. (1979), Colonial Connecticut – A History, New York: U.S. Div. of Kraus-Thompson Organization Ltd.
- Todd, Charles B (1906), The History of Redding, Connecticut, Newburgh, NY: Newburgh Journal Co
- Tucker, Louis L (1962), Puritan Protagonist- President Thomas Clap of Yale College, Chapel Hill, North Carolina: University of North Carolina Press
