= Faggs Manor, Pennsylvania =

Unincorporated community in Pennsylvania, U.S.

Coordinates: 39°51′28″N 75°54′34″W

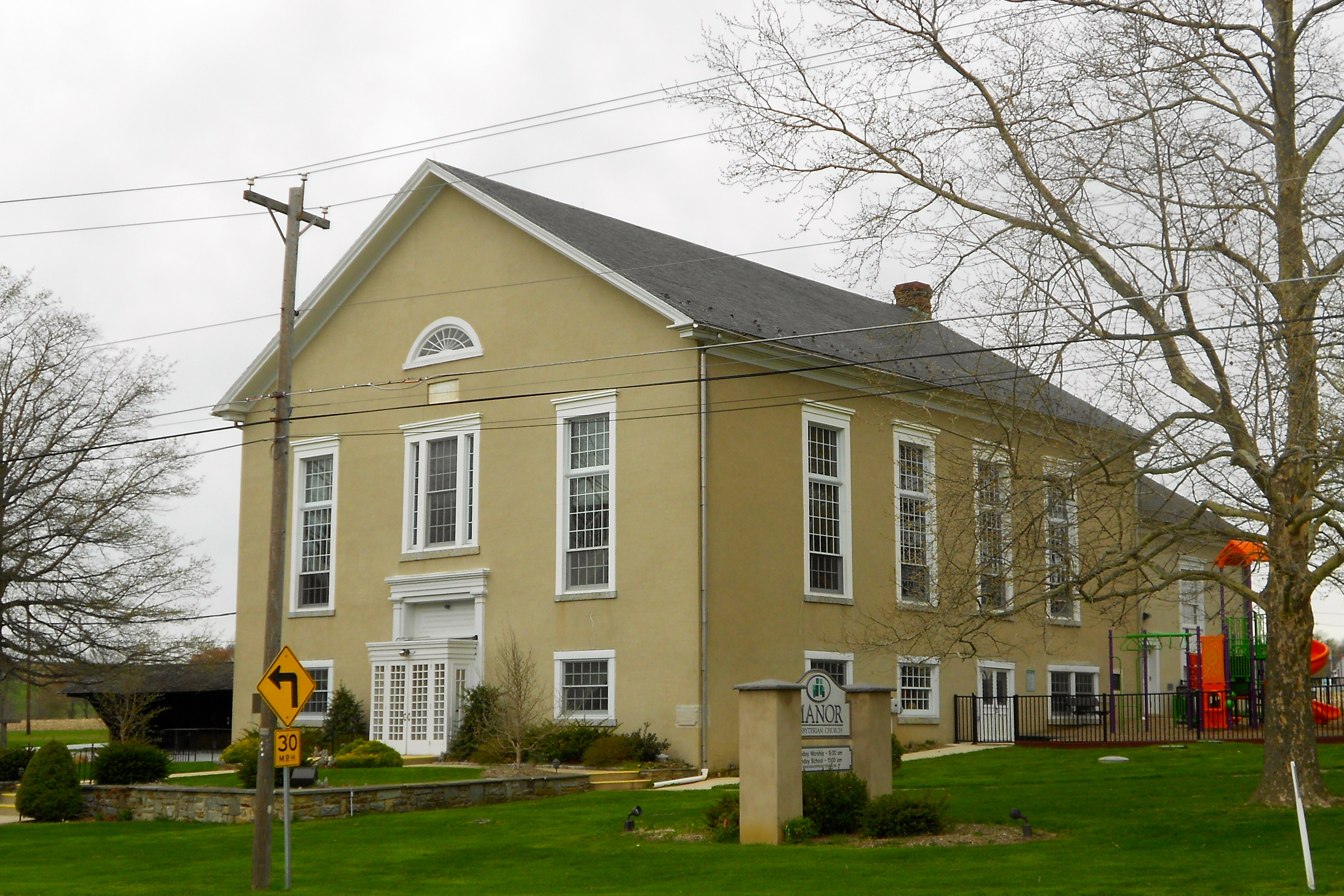
Faggs Manor Presbyterian Church

Faggs Manor is an unincorporated community in Londonderry Township, Chester County, Pennsylvania, United States. The hamlet, at the corner of Street Road (PA 926) and Faggs Manor Road includes a church and cemetery with a few nearby houses.

== History ==
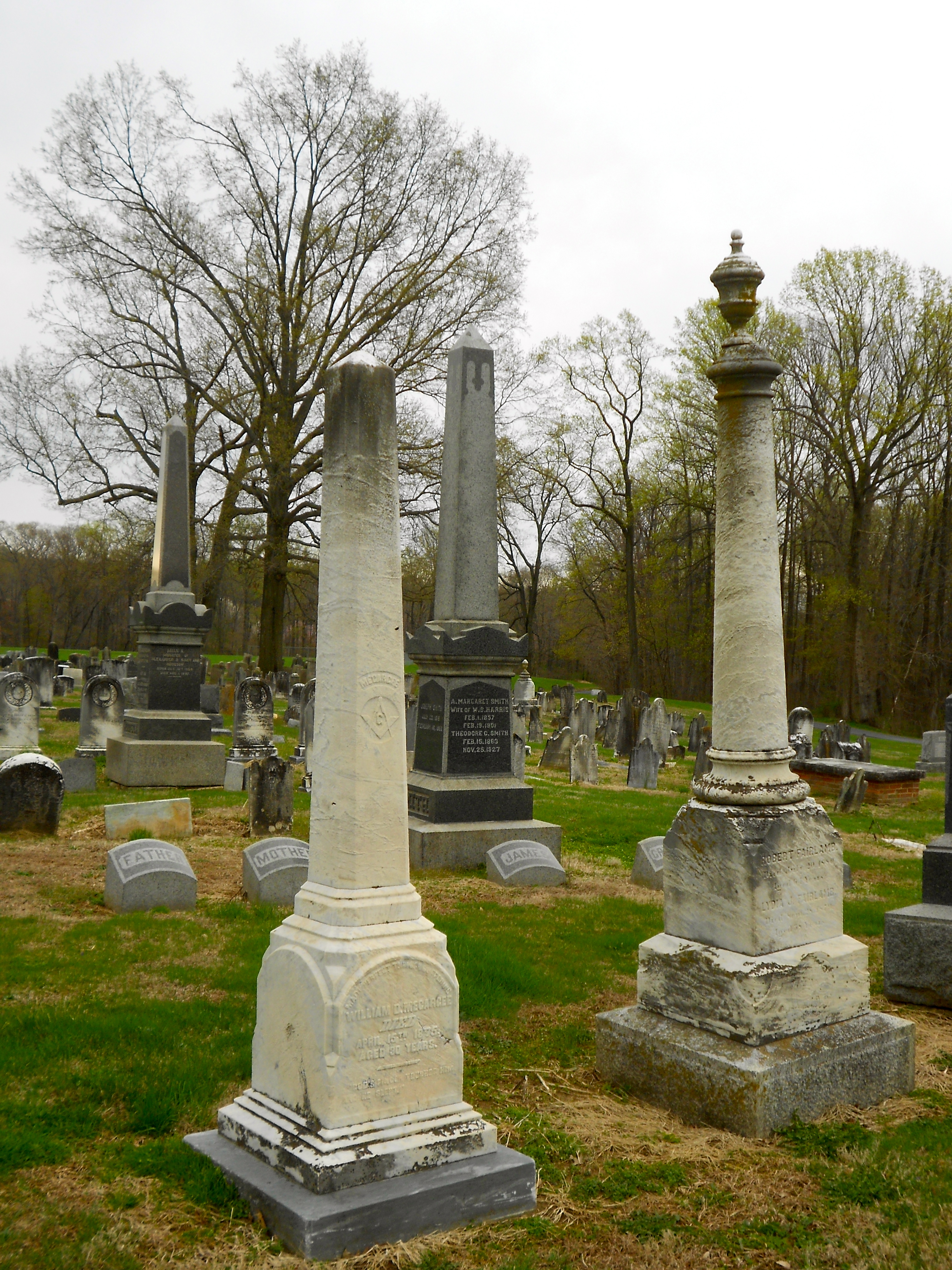
Cemetery

The earliest European settlement of the area began in the 1730s. Two paths used by the early settlers, one along the Big Elk Creek and the other over the hills of Highland Township met near Faggs Manor. A historic Presbyterian church was founded here about 1730. The first pastor, Samuel Blair, was one of the leaders of the Presbyterian New Light religious movement that swept the colonies as part of the First Great Awakening. He also founded a school, Faggs Manor Classical School, near the church. Blair's son, also named Samuel Blair was born in Fagg's Manor, and became the second Chaplain of the United States House of Representatives. The church was rebuilt in 1846 and is now known simply as the Manor Presbyterian Church.

A post office called Faggs Manor was established in 1887, and remained in operation until 1902. The community was named for Sir John Fagg, a member of the extended family of William Penn.
