= Samuel Finley =

Irish-born Presbyterian minister (1715–1766)

The Reverend Samuel Finley
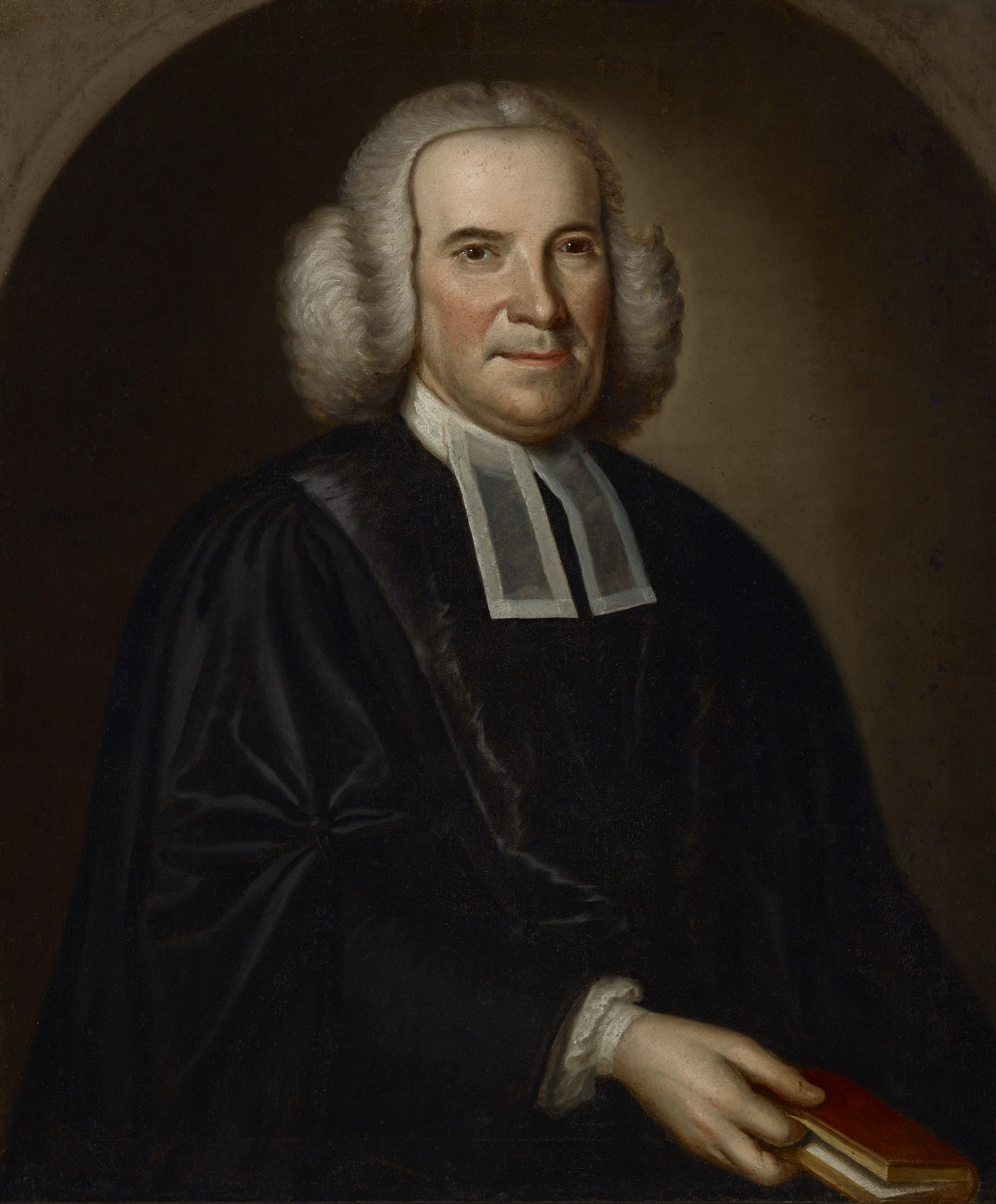
- Portarit by John Hesselius

5th President of Princeton University
- In office 1761–1766
- Preceded by: Samuel Davies
- Succeeded by: John Blair (acting)

Personal details
- Born: July 2, 1715 County Armagh, Ireland
- Died: July 17, 1766 (aged 51) Philadelphia, Province of Pennsylvania
- Parent(s): Michael Lauder Finley; Anna O'Neill
- Relatives: Martha Finley

Samuel Finley (July 2, 1715 – July 17, 1766) was an Irish-born Presbyterian minister and academic who spent his adult life and career in the American colonies. He founded the West Nottingham Academy in Maryland, and was the fifth president and an original trustee of the College of New Jersey (later renamed as Princeton University) from 1761 until 1766.

== Early life ==
Finley was the second son from a family of at least nine children of Michael Lauder Finley and Anna (née O'Neill) Finley. At least two of his brothers, James and Andrew, became ministers.

He emigrated to Philadelphia in late 1734 and studied at William Tennent's Log College, in Neshaminy, Bucks County, Pennsylvania. The Log College was known for its training of evangelical Presbyterian ministers who played a role in the 18th century religious revival known as The Great Awakening.

== Ministry ==
In 1743 Finley was assigned by the New Brunswick Presbytery to the newly formed (January 1742) Presbyterian congregation at Milford, Connecticut. This congregation was started when 39 Scotch-Irish people applied under the Toleration Act as Presbyterians under the Church of Scotland. The larger community of Connecticut may have tolerated this new church, but actions indicate they did not foster and encourage it.

In May 1742, the Presbyterians were denied erecting their church on the commons. In November 1742, with the aid of a court order, they built their first church nearby on donated land. Their first five ministers were harassed with fines, imprisonment, and threats of being apprehended as early as January 1742. It was into this climate that Rev. Samuel Finley was assigned to the Milford Presbyterian congregation. He preached in Milford on August 25, and in New Haven, Connecticut on September 1, 1743. For this, he was prosecuted and condemned. Governor Jonathan Law ordered him "transported as a vagrant" from the Connecticut colony. Charles Augustus Hanna, author of The Scotch-Irish, concludes that this "harsh treatment", so "contrary to the British Constitution", sowed seeds of revolution by acting as a "forfeiture under the Colonial Charter". In any event, Finley was escorted from Connecticut and advanced on his journey to New Jersey and his future.

About this time, Finley is said to have founded the West Nottingham Academy. He also may have served as pastor of the Cold Spring Presbyterian Church, on Cape May, New Jersey for several years around this time.

During Finley's five-year presidency at Princeton, the college graduated 130 students, including the Rev. James Manning (graduated in 1762), the founder and first president of Brown University; Ebenezer Hazard (1762), the third United States Postmaster General; William Paterson (1763), the second governor of the State of New Jersey; the Rev. Samuel Kirkland (1765), founder and first president of Hamilton College; David Ramsay (1765), physician and historian of the American Revolution; and Oliver Ellsworth (1766), the third Chief Justice of the United States. Finley's sermons, Hazard said, "were calculated to inform the ignorant, to alarm the careless and secure, and to edify and comfort the faithful".

Finley was awarded an honorary degree by the University of Glasgow.

== Personal life ==
On September 26, 1744, Samuel Finley married Sarah Hall (1728 – July 30, 1760), daughter of Joseph Hall and Rebecca Rutter. Various sources report five sons and three daughters were born of this union.

On May 13, 1761, Finley married Ann Clarkson (1730–1807), daughter of Matthew Clarkson and Cornelia de Peyste, of Philadelphia. They reportedly had issue.

Samuel Finley Breese Morse, the developer of the telegraph and the namesake of Morse Code, was Finley's great-grandson via his daughter, Rebecca.

In about 1750, Sarah's nephew Benjamin Rush, later a signer of the Declaration of Independence, moved into the Finley home at the age of six (some sources say eight) upon the death of his father. He was one of Finley's students at West Nottingham Academy. Finley is said to have convinced Rush to become a physician. Rush later attended Finley as his physician at the time of his death.

Another signer of the Declaration of Independence, Richard Stockton, studied under Finley at West Nottingham Academy. Stockton's daughter, Julia, subsequently married Benjamin Rush.

== Final days ==
Finley died on July 17, 1766. Archibald Alexander describes Finley's "dying experience" in his Thoughts on Religious Experience, and notes that "during his whole sickness he was never heard to utter a repining word; and in taking leave of his dearest friends he was never seen to shed a tear, or exhibit any sign of sorrow." After his death his slaves were auctioned on the Princeton campus.

It is thought that the so-called "Stamp Act Trees" (sycamores) planted in front of the then-President's home at Princeton were planted by Finley.

== Memorial ==
Though Finley's body was originally buried at the 2nd Presbyterian Church of Philadelphia, when the building at Arch and Cherry Sts. was torn down, his body was moved and re-buried at Abington Presbyterian Church Cemetery in Abington Township, Montgomery County, Pennsylvania in 1853.

== Notes ==
Academic offices
Preceded by Samuel Davies	President of the College of New Jersey; 1761–1766	Succeeded by John Witherspoon
