= Samuel Blair (chaplain) =

American minister

The Reverend Samuel Blair
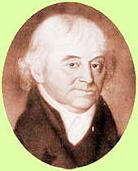
- Born: 1741; Faggs Manor, Pennsylvania
- Died: September 1818 (aged 76–77); Germantown, Pennsylvania
- Education: The College of New Jersey; Harvard College; University of Pennsylvania
- Occupations: Presbyterian minister Chaplain of Congress
- Spouse: Susan Shippen Blair
- Children: Two sons, three daughters
- Parent: Samuel Blair

Samuel Blair (1741 – September 1818) was an American Presbyterian minister and the second Chaplain of the United States House of Representatives.

== Early life ==
Blair was born in 1741 in Faggs Manor, near Cochranville, Chester County, Pennsylvania, the son of a Presbyterian minister also named Samuel Blair who died when the son was about ten years old. His mother was Frances van Hook, daughter of Judge Lawrence van Hook and Johanna (Smith) van Hook.

== Education ==
His primary education was at his father's theology school, the Faggs Manor Classical School. He went on to earn a B.A. in 1760 and a M.A. in 1764 from The College of New Jersey (now Princeton University), where he also tutored from 1761-1764. He was licensed to preach by the Presbytery of Newcastle in 1764. He earned a M.A. from Harvard College in 1767 and a D.D. (Doctor of Divinity) from the University of Pennsylvania in 1790.

== Work ==
A conscientious and eloquent minister, he became pastor of the Old South Church in Boston in 1766. While traveling to Boston, he survived a shipwreck but became ill and lost his possessions including the sermons he had written. In the spring of 1769, he traveled to Philadelphia and became severely ill, believing he would not recover. Because of his poor health, and conflict with his church members regarding the Half-Way Covenant, he resigned and was dismissed on October 10, 1769. He then moved to Germantown, Pennsylvania. During the American Revolutionary War, he was a chaplain of the Continental Army from 1775 until June 20, 1780. His rank as an officer made him eligible for membership in the Society of the Cincinnati. He was appointed the second Chaplain of Congress on December 10, 1790, a position he held for two years, until he was replaced by Ashbel Green on November 5, 1792. Blair was a member of the American Philosophical Society (elected in 1797) and died in Germantown in September 1818.

== Family ==
Upon return to Pennsylvania in 1769, he married Susan Shippen, the daughter of William Shippen, a Philadelphia physician and delegate to the Continental Congress. They had two sons and three daughters. His wife died in 1821.

== Published sermons ==
Blair published two sermons. One was a eulogy to Reverend John Blair Smith who died in 1799.

Religious titles
Preceded by William Linn	Chaplain of the United States House of Representatives; December 10, 1790 – November 5, 1792	Succeeded by Ashbel Green
