= George William Burleigh =

George William Burleigh Jr.
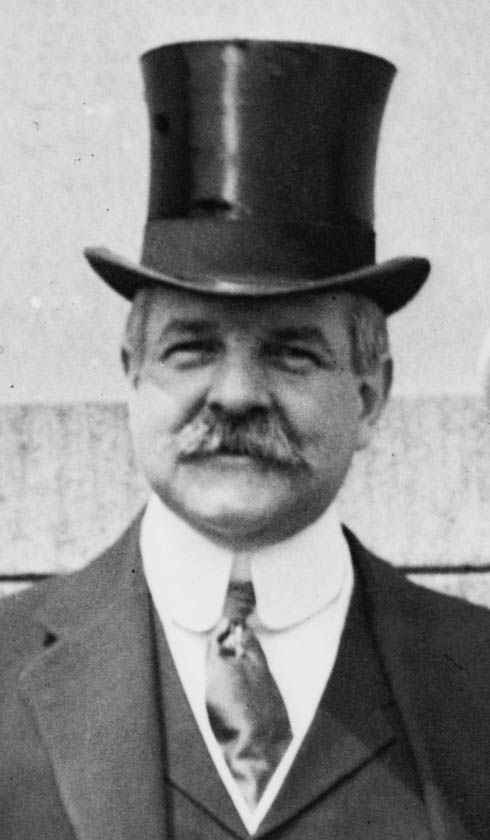
- George William Burleigh c. 1913
- Born: April 18, 1870; Somersworth, New Hampshire, U.S.
- Died: March 15, 1940 (aged 69); New York City, New York, U.S.
- Education: St. Paul's School; Princeton University (1892); New York Law School
- Awards: Conspicuous Service Cross; Legion of Honour
Coat of Arms of George William Burleigh

George William Burleigh Jr. (April 18, 1870 – March 15, 1940) was a director of the Lackawanna Steel Company and a Colonel in the New York National Guard who commanded the Ninth Coast Defense during World War I.

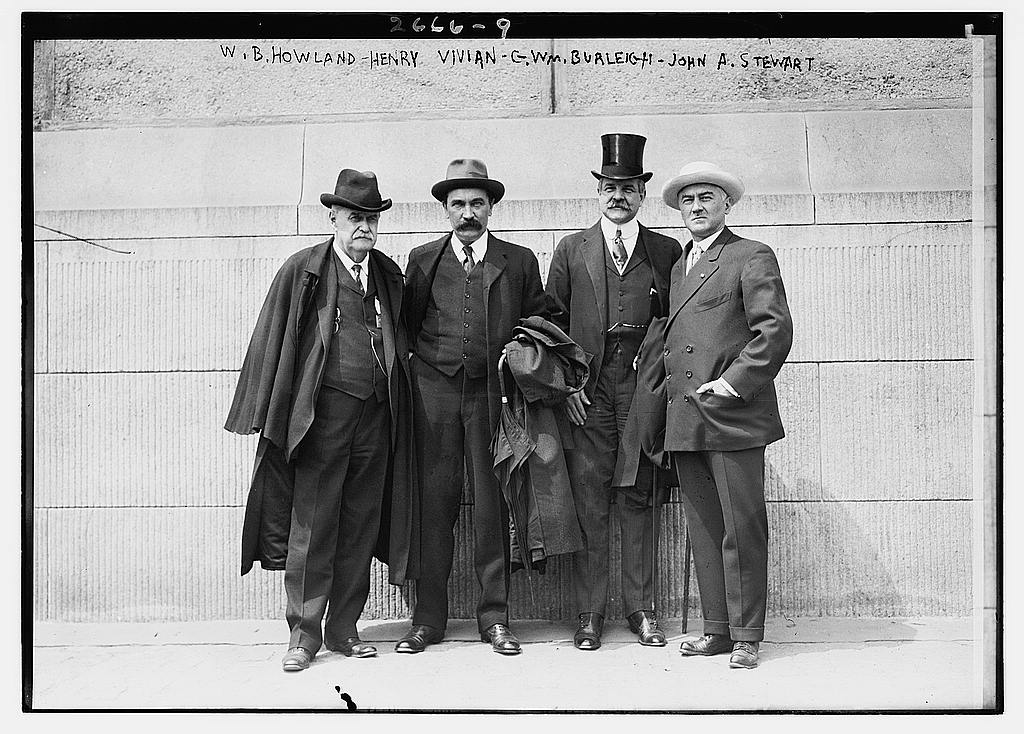
William Bailey Howland, Henry Harvey Vivian, George William Burleigh, and John Aikman Stewart of the American Peace Centenary Committee circa 1913

== Biography ==
He was born on April 18, 1870, in Somersworth, New Hampshire, to George William Burleigh Sr. (1830–1878) and Hannah Louise Bryant. He attended at St. Paul's School in Concord, New Hampshire. He graduated from Princeton University in 1892. He attended New York Law School and then married Isis Yturbide Stockton (1868–1945).

In 1913 he was on the American Peace Centenary Committee. By 1914 he was a director of the Lackawanna Steel Company.

He replaced Colonel Edward Coleman Delafield to commanded the Ninth Coast Defense Command of the New York Guard during World War I.

He relinquished his command in 1919 to become the assistant Inspector General for the New York Guard.

He was awarded the Chevalier Legion d'Honneur by René Viviani on April 11, 1921. He was awarded the Conspicuous Service Cross of the State of New York on June 4, 1921.

He died on March 15, 1940, in New York City.

His widow died in 1943.
