= List of covers of Time magazine (1930s) =

This is a list of people and other topics appearing on the cover of Time magazine in the 1930s. Time was first published in 1923. As Time became established as one of the United States' leading news magazines, an appearance on the cover of Time became an indicator of notability, fame or notoriety. Such features were accompanied by articles about the topic.

For other decades, see Lists of covers of Time magazine.

== 1930 ==
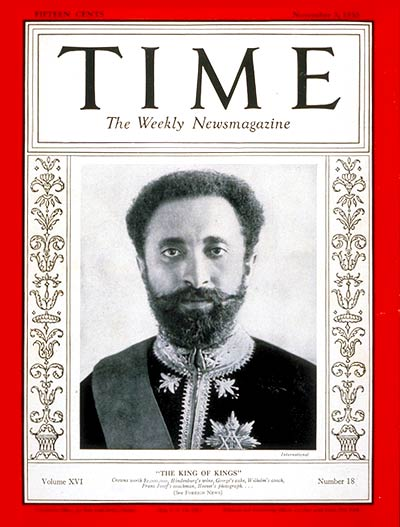
Cover for November 3, 1930, with Haile Selassie

- January 6 – Owen D. Young
- January 13 – Domingo Ugalde
- January 20 – André Tardieu
- January 27 – William D. Mitchell
- February 3 – Maria Montessori
- February 10 – Ray Lyman Wilbur
- February 17 – Charles Evans Hughes
- February 24 – Cyrus S. Eaton
- March 3 – Pointer Mary Blue
- March 10 – Royal Cortissoz
- March 17 – Queen Mary
- March 24 – Al Capone
- March 31 – Mahatma Gandhi
- April 7 – Heber Jedediah Grant
- April 14 – William H. Welch
- April 21 – Philip Snowden
- April 28 – Leopold Stokowski
- May 5 – Julius H. Barnes
- May 12 – Alois Lang
- May 19 – Yan Xishan
- May 26 – Edward G. V. Stanley
- June 2 – William Adams Delano
- June 9 – Joseph Stalin
- June 16 – William C. Procter
- June 23 – Julio Prestes
- June 30 – Lucrezia Bori
- July 7 – Louis D. Brandeis
- July 14 – Herbert Hoover Jr.
- July 21 – David A. Reed
- July 28 – Richard B. Bennett
- August 4 – Alexander Legge
- August 11 – Lady Elizabeth Bowes-Lyon, Duchess of York
- August 18 – Mrs. Thomas Hitchcock (Louise Eustis Hitchcock)
- August 26 – Wilbert Robinson
- September 1 – Lord Dawson
- September 8 – Augusto B. Leguía
- September 15 – Harold S. Vanderbilt
- September 22 – Bobby Jones
- September 29 – Dwight W. Morrow
- October 6 – Harry Emerson Fosdick
- October 13 – Sergei Koussevitsky
- October 20 – Henri Matisse
- October 27 – King George V and Queen Mary
- November 3 – Emperor Haile Selassie
- November 10 – Jouett Shouse
- November 17 – Football's Public
- November 24 – Robert Bulkley
- December 1 – James J. Davis
- December 8 – King Haakon VII
- December 15 – Mary Garden
- December 22 – Elsa Einstein
- December 29 – Pope Pius XI

== 1931 ==
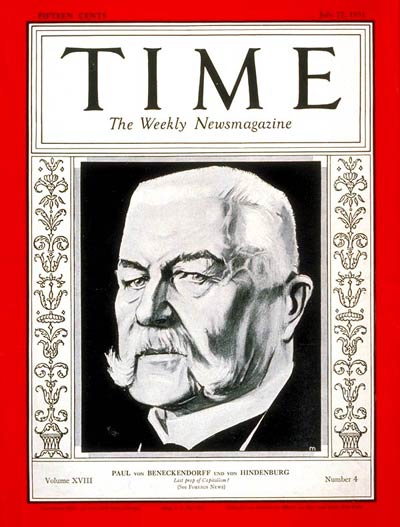
Cover for July 27,1931, with Paul von Hindenburg

- January 5 – Mahatma Gandhi
- January 12 – James Ewing
- January 19 – Gerardo Machado
- January 26 – William Borah
- February 2 – George Wickersham
- February 9 – Charlie Chaplin
- February 16 – Joseph Deems Taylor aka Deems Taylor
- February 23 – Vyacheslav Menzhinsky
- March 2 – David S. Ingalls
- March 9 – Charles R. Crane
- March 16 – Oswald Mosley
- March 23 – John F. Curry
- March 30 – Walter Lippmann
- April 6 – King Alfonso XIII
- April 13 – Roy W. Howard
- April 20 – King Prajadhipok
- April 27 – Mrs. Nanaline Duke
- May 4 – Niceto Alcalá-Zamora
- May 11 – Hubert Lyautey
- May 18 – Kenkichi Kagami
- May 25 – Walter Coffey, John Humber and Grace Hammond Conners
- June 1 – Samuel R. McKelvie
- June 8 – David Starr Jordan
- June 15 – Heinrich Brüning
- June 22 – Morton Downey
- June 29 – Cyril Alington
- July 6 – Betty Nuthall
- July 13 – Ogden L. Mills
- July 20 – Nikola Tesla
- July 27 – Paul von Hindenburg
- August 3 – Willa Cather
- August 10 – Paul W. Litchfield
- August 17 – Samuel Seabury
- August 24 – Albert H. Wiggin
- August 31 – Winthrop W. Aldrich
- September 7 – Ramsay MacDonald, Stanley Baldwin and David Lloyd George
- September 14 – Patrick Jay Hurley
- September 21 – Ross S. Sterling
- September 28 – Pierre Laval and Aristide Briand
- October 5 – Primo Carnera
- October 12 – Baron Kijuro Shidehara
- October 19 – William Green
- October 26 – Chiang Kai-shek and Mme. Chiang
- November 2 – Eugene O'Neill
- November 9 – Rosa Ponselle
- November 16 – Dino Grandi
- November 23 – Barry Wood
- November 30 – Walter Runciman
- December 7 – John Nance Garner
- December 14 – James H. Breasted
- December 21 – Adolf Hitler
- December 28 – Ki Inukai

== 1932 ==
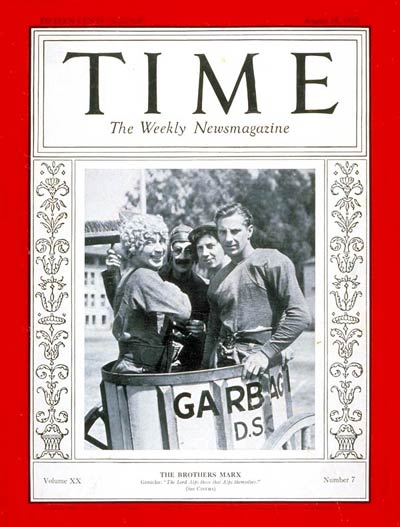
Cover for August 15, 1932, with the Marx Brothers

- January 4 – Pierre Laval
- January 11 – Daniel Willard
- January 18 – Errett Lobban Cord
- January 25 – Philip Barry
- February 1 – Franklin D. Roosevelt
- February 8 – Hugh S. Gibson
- February 15 – Nicholas M. Butler
- February 22 – Yehudi Menuhin
- February 29 – William Murray
- March 7 – John Barrymore and Lionel Barrymore
- March 14 – Clarence Young
- March 21 – John A. Simon
- March 28 – Gabby Street
- April 4 – Robinson Jeffers
- April 11 – Éamon de Valera
- April 18 – The Circus
- April 25 – Neville Chamberlain
- May 2 – Charles A. Lindbergh Jr.
- May 9 – Rt. Rev. James Edward Freeman
- May 16 – Édouard Herriot
- May 23 – Newton D. Baker
- May 31 – Eugene Meyer
- June 6 – Emperor Hirohito
- June 13 – Walter F. Brown
- June 20 – Carlos Dávila
- June 27 – Alfred E. Smith
- July 4 – Franz von Papen
- July 11 – Ben Eastman
- July 18 – Pauline Sabin
- July 25 – Earl of Bessborough, First lady and page
- August 1 – Ellsworth Vines
- August 8 – Norman M. Thomas
- August 15 – Groucho, Harpo, Chico and Zeppo Marx
- August 22 – Kurt von Schleicher
- August 29 – William G. McAdoo
- September 5 – Yasuya Uchida
- September 12 – Henry L. Stevens Jr.
- September 19 – Jacob Ruppert
- September 26 – Edward Dickinson Duffield
- October 3 – Huey P. Long
- October 10 – King George V
- October 17 – Lily Pons
- October 24 – Rufus D. Isaacs
- October 31 – James Farley
- November 7 – Common Citizens
- November 14 – Howard Jones
- November 21 – Melvin A. Traylor
- November 28 – T. E. Lawrence
- December 5 – Charles Curtis
- December 12 – Norman H. Davis
- December 19 – Henry T. Rainey
- December 26 – Katharine Cornell

== 1933 ==
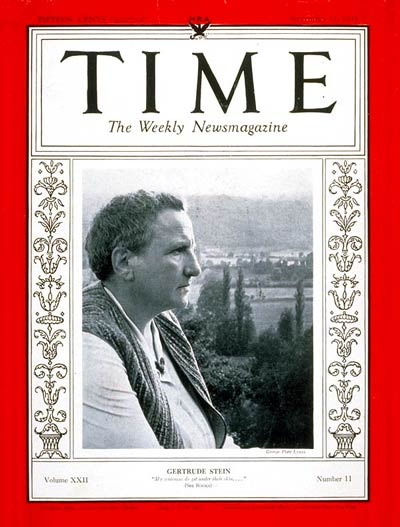
Cover for September 11, 1933, with Gertrude Stein

- January 2 – Franklin D. Roosevelt, Man of the Year
- January 9 – Charles F. Kettering
- January 16 – Lawrence Tibbett
- January 23 – Sadao Araki
- January 30 – Noël Coward
- February 6 – Carter Glass
- February 13 – Richard Leigh
- February 20 – William W. Atterbury
- February 27 – Pat Harrison
- March 6 – Sara Delano Roosevelt
- March 13 – Adolf Hitler
- March 20 – William H. Woodin
- March 27 – John Hay Whitney
- April 3 – Pope Pius XI
- April 10 – Henry A. Wallace
- April 17 – Cordell Hull
- April 24 – Maxim Litvinov
- May 1 – William R. Hearst
- May 8 – Raymond Moley
- May 15 – Gerardo Machado
- May 22 – Rufus C. Dawes
- May 29 – Édouard Daladier
- June 5 – Frank Aydelotte
- June 12 – Ferdinand Pecora
- June 19 – Neville Chamberlain
- June 26 – Italo Balbo
- July 3 – Hugh S. Johnson
- July 10 – Joseph Goebbels
- July 17 – Curtis Bok
- July 24 – Harold L. Ickes
- July 31 – Juan Trippe
- August 7 – Marie Dressler
- August 14 – Frances Perkins
- August 21 – Hermann Göring
- August 28 – Edward J. Kelly
- September 4 – Jack Crawford
- September 11 – Gertrude Stein
- September 18 – George F. Zook
- September 25 – Engelbert Dollfuss
- October 2 – John L. Lewis
- October 9 – George M. Cohan
- October 16 – Percy S. Straus
- October 23 – Fiorello LaGuardia, John P. O'Brien and Joseph V. McKee
- October 30 – Maxime Weygand
- November 6 – George Peek
- November 13 – Football
- November 20 – Eleanor Roosevelt
- November 27 – George F. Warren
- December 4 – Seton Porter
- December 11 – Chiang Kai-shek
- December 18 – Eugene Luther Vidal
- December 25 – Alice in Wonderland (Alec B. Francis and Charlotte Henry)

== 1934 ==
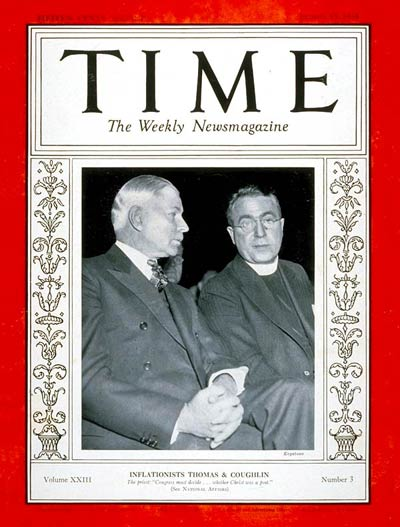
Cover for January 15, 1934, with Elmer Thomas and Charles Coughlin

- January 1 – Hugh S. Johnson, Man of the Year
- January 8 – Walter P. Chrysler
- January 15 – Elmer Thomas and Charles Coughlin
- January 22 – Jesse H. Jones
- January 29 – James Joyce
- February 5 – James B. Conant
- February 12 – Kliment Voroshilov
- February 19 – Harry L. Hopkins
- February 26 – Richard Whitney
- March 5 – Puyi
- March 12 – Gaston Doumergue
- March 19 – Robert F. Wagner
- March 26 – George Arliss
- April 2 – Arturo Toscanini
- April 9 – Vincent Astor
- April 16 – Sir Arthur Eddington
- April 23 – Errett Lobban Cord
- April 30 – Robert Lee Doughton
- May 7 – Edward R. Bradley
- May 14 – Samuel Insull
- May 21 – Kōki Hirota
- May 28 – Irving Berlin
- June 4 – Joseph M. Reeves
- June 11 – Thomas Mann
- June 18 – Harold Willis Dodds
- June 25 – Rexford G. Tugwell
- July 2 – Reza Shah Pahlevi
- July 9 – Vernon Gomez
- July 16 – Paul von Hindenburg
- July 23 – Joseph B. Poindexter
- July 30 – James Farley
- August 6 – Kurt Schmitt
- August 13 – Elsa Schiaparelli
- August 20 – Cavalcade
- August 27 – Cecil B. DeMille
- September 3 – Fred Perry
- September 10 – Donald Richberg
- September 17 – Henry Morgenthau
- September 24 – Louis Barthou
- October 1 – Henry Noble MacCracken
- October 8 – Helen Rogers Reid and Friends
- October 15 – Reverend James Perry
- October 22 – Upton Sinclair
- October 29 – Roscoe Turner
- November 5 – Henry P. Fletcher
- November 12 – Joseph C. Grew
- November 19 – Robert M. La Follette Jr.
- November 26 – Benjamin N. Cardozo
- December 3 – Lázaro Cárdenas
- December 10 – Maxwell Anderson
- December 17 – White House Staffers (Marguerite LeHand, Louis Howe, Gus Gennerich, Marvin Hunter McIntyre)
- December 24 – Thomas Hart Benton
- December 31 – Herbert H. Lehman

== 1935 ==
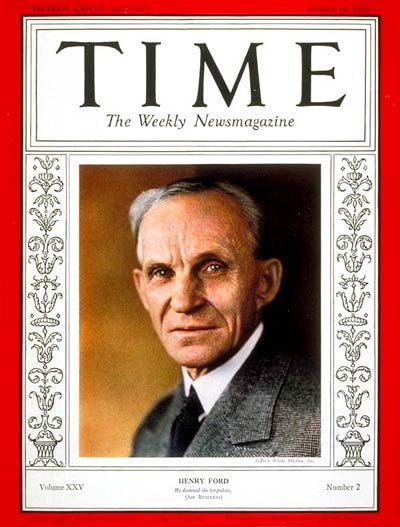
Cover for January 14, 1935, with Henry Ford

- January 7 – Franklin D. Roosevelt, Man of the Year
- January 14 – Henry Ford
- January 21 – John Thomas Taylor
- January 28 – Kathleen Norris
- February 4 – Pierre-Étienne Flandin
- February 11 – Lorne Chabot
- February 18 – Lotte Lehmann
- February 25 – Samuel Clay Williams
- March 4 – Richard B. Harrison
- March 11 – Frank J. Hogan
- March 18 – Wang Jingwei
- March 25 – General Douglas MacArthur
- April 1 – Huey P. Long
- April 8 – Anthony Eden and Sir John Simon
- April 15 – Dizzy Dean
- April 22 – Joseph W. Byrns
- April 29 – John Francis Neylan
- May 6 – King George V
- May 13 – Harry F. Byrd
- May 20 – Hirosi Saito
- May 27 – Miriam Hopkins
- June 3 – John Nance Garner
- June 10 – Emanuel Libman
- June 17 – Stanley Baldwin
- June 24 – Robert M. Hutchins
- July 1 – John Cowles
- July 8 – Joseph Lyons
- July 15 – Joseph T. Robinson
- July 22 – Joseph P. Kennedy
- July 29 – Harlow Shapley
- August 5 – J. Edgar Hoover
- August 12 – Queen Wilhelmina
- August 19 – Jean Harlow
- August 26 – Hugo L. Black
- September 2 – Donald Budge
- September 9 – Clyde L. Herring
- September 16 – Alexis Carrel
- September 23 – Sir Samuel Hoare
- September 30 – Cardinal Hayes
- October 7 – Mickey Cochrane
- October 14 – Herbert C. Hoover
- October 21 – John Buchan, 1st Baron Tweedsmuir
- October 28 – Bruno Mussolini, Benito Mussolini and Vittorio Mussolini
- November 4 – James A. Macauley
- November 11 – Football Spectators
- November 18 – Mark Sullivan
- November 25 – Manuel L. Quezon
- December 2 – Edwin C. Musick
- December 9 – William Phillips
- December 16 – Alexei Stakhanov
- December 23 – Kirsten Flagstad
- December 30 – Helen Hayes

== 1936 ==
- January 6 – Haile Selassie, Man of the Year
- January 13 – Arthur H. Compton
- January 20 – J. P. Morgan Jr.
- January 27 – Abby Aldrich Rockefeller
- February 3 – George Santayana
- February 10 – Marriner S. Eccles
- February 17 – Leni Riefenstahl
- February 24 – Hirohito, Puyi, Joseph Stalin and Chiang Kai-shek
- March 2 – Emil Hurja
- March 9 – Léon Blum
- March 16 – Martin W. Clement
- March 23 – Isaiah Bowman
- March 30 – William Borah
- April 6 – Daniel W. Hoan
- April 13 – Adolf Hitler
- April 20 – Frank N. D. Buchman
- April 27 – Shirley Temple
- May 4 – Torkild Rieber
- May 11 – Franz Boas
- May 18 – Alfred Landon
- May 25 – Joseph DeLee
- June 1 – Pat Harrison
- June 8 – James V. Allred
- June 15 – James R. Angell
- June 22 – French strikers
- June 29 – Sir Samuel Hoare
- July 6 – John L. Lewis
- July 13 – Joe DiMaggio
- July 20 – Benito Mussolini
- July 27 – Leroy Miner
- August 3 – Charles Phelps Taft II
- August 10 – John Dos Passos
- August 17 – William L. Clayton
- August 24 – Francisco Franco, Emilio Mola and Manuel Azaña
- August 31 – Clark Gable
- September 7 – Eugene Talmadge
- September 14 – Helen Hull Jacobs
- September 21 – John D. M. Hamilton
- September 28 – James B. Conant
- October 5 – Lou Gehrig and Carl Hubbell
- October 12 – Lord Linlithgow
- October 19 – Eugenio Pacelli
- October 26 – Thomas Parran Jr.
- November 2 – Joseph M. Patterson and Robert R. McCormick
- November 9 – Chiang Kai-shek
- November 16 – Anthony Grzebyk
- November 23 – Edward F. McGrady
- November 30 – Marlene Dietrich
- December 7 – Cordell Hull
- December 14 – Salvador Dalí
- December 21 – Edward Johnson
- December 28 – Emperor Hirohito

== 1937 ==
- January 4 – Wallis Warfield Simpson, Woman of the Year
- January 11 – George Norris
- January 18 – William S. Knudsen
- January 25 – Leon Trotsky
- February 1 – Thomas E. Dewey
- February 8 – John J. Pelley
- February 15 – Cardinal Dougherty
- February 22 – Osman Ali Khan, Asaf Jah VII
- March 1 – Charles E. Hughes
- March 8 – King George VI
- March 15 – Joseph E. Davies and his wife Marjorie Merriweather Post
- March 22 – Clarence Little
- March 29 – Clyde Beatty
- April 5 – Harry B. Housser
- April 12 – Virginia Woolf
- April 19 – Bob Feller
- April 26 – Fulgencio Batista
- May 3 – Billy and Bobby Mauch
- May 10 – Matt Winn
- May 17 – King Christian X
- May 24 – Cosmo Gordon Lang
- May 31 – Dionne Quintuplets
- June 7 – Sidney Howard
- June 14 – Paul van Zeeland
- June 21 – Morris Fishbein
- June 28 – Ethel du Pont and Franklin D. Roosevelt Jr.
- July 5 – George Earle III
- July 12 – James E. West
- July 19 – Harry Bridges
- July 26 – Fumimaro Konoe
- August 2 – Fiorello LaGuardia
- August 9 – King Farouk I
- August 16 – Paul Muni
- August 23 – Alben Barkley
- August 30 – Mitsumasa Yonai
- September 6 – Francisco Franco
- September 13 – Gottfried von Cramm
- September 20 – Mitchell Hepburn
- September 27 – Walter Lippmann
- October 4 – William Green
- October 11 – William O. Douglas
- October 18 – Ernest Hemingway
- October 25 – Wallace Wade
- November 1 – Ernest O. Lawrence
- November 8 – Alfred Lunt and Lynn Fontanne
- November 15 – Louis Brandeis
- November 22 – King Leopold III
- November 29 – William B. Bankhead
- December 6 – Jean Sibelius
- December 13 – Colby M. Chester, Chairman of General Foods
- December 20 – Joseph Stalin
- December 27 – Walt Disney

== 1938 ==
- January 3 – Chiang Kai-shek and Mme. Chiang, Couple of the Year
- January 10 – Wesley W. Stout
- January 17 – Frank Lloyd Wright
- January 24 – Walter F. White
- January 31 – Roswell Magill
- February 7 – John L. Lewis
- February 14 – Sebastián Pozas Perea
- February 21 – John G. Bates
- February 28 – James Roosevelt
- March 7 – Subhas Chandra Bose
- March 14 – Dave Kerr
- March 21 – Kurt von Schuschnigg
- March 28 – Bette Davis
- April 4 – Albert Einstein
- April 11 – Joe Martin
- April 18 – Lewis Mumford
- April 25 – Reza Shah Pahlavi
- May 2 – Claude Pepper
- May 9 – Orson Welles
- May 16 – Frank R. McNinch
- May 23 – Donald W. Douglas
- May 30 – Earl Browder
- June 6 – Johnny Goodman
- June 13 – Charles A. Lindbergh and Alexis Carrel
- June 20 – Robert W. Wood
- June 27 – Edvard Beneš
- July 4 – Otway H. Chalkley
- July 11 – Walter Winchell
- July 18 – Harry L. Hopkins
- July 25 – Richard Strauss
- August 1 – Albert B. Chandler
- August 8 – Frank Capra
- August 15 – William McChesney Martin Jr.
- August 22 – Louis A. Johnson
- August 29 – Lázaro Cárdenas
- September 5 – Holger Cahill
- September 12 – Thomas Corcoran and Benjamin V. Cohen
- September 19 – William S. Paley
- September 26 – Richard Rodgers and Lorenz Hart
- October 3 – William L. Bragg
- October 10 – Sergei Koussevitzky
- October 17 – Neville Chamberlain
- October 24 – Sheridan Downey
- October 31 – Frederick L. Redefer
- November 7 – André Malraux
- November 14 – Henry Grady Weaver
- November 21 – Elmer F. Andrews
- November 28 – Lord Beaverbrook
- December 5 – Clifford Odets
- December 12 – Prince Paul
- December 19 – Henry A. Wallace
- December 26 – Charlot's 'Nativity'

== 1939 ==
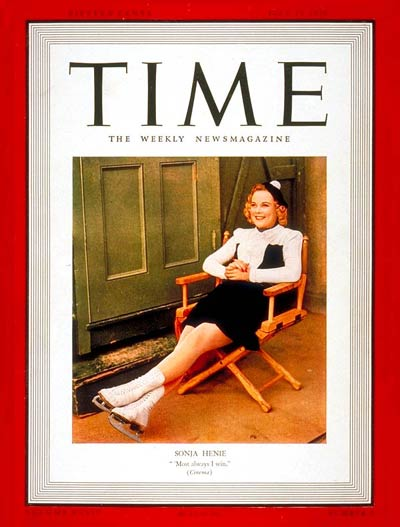
Cover for July 17, 1939, with Sonja Henie

- January 2 – Adolf Hitler, Man of the Year
- January 9 – Oscar Riddle
- January 16 – Julius P. Heil
- January 23 – William Faulkner
- January 30 – Henry E. Sigerist
- February 6 – Robert Fechner
- February 13 – Pablo Picasso
- February 20 – Charles Edison
- February 27 – Ignace J. Paderewski
- March 6 – Josef Beck
- March 13 – William R. Hearst
- March 20 – John Nance Garner
- March 27 – Francisco Franco
- April 3 – Lewis H. Brown
- April 10 – Ginger Rogers
- April 17 – Eleanor Roosevelt
- April 24 – Heinrich Himmler
- May 1 – Grover A. Whalen
- May 8 – James Joyce
- May 15 – King George VI
- May 22 – Nelson Rockefeller
- May 29 – Glenn L. Martin
- June 5 – Édouard Daladier
- June 12 – Dorothy Thompson
- June 19 – Charles A. Lindbergh
- June 26 – Sigmund Freud
- July 3 – Edwin G. Conklin
- July 10 – Paul V. McNutt
- July 17 – Sonja Henie
- July 24 – Edda Ciano
- July 31 – Wendell L. Willkie
- August 7 – William Woodward
- August 14 – Maurice Gamelin
- August 21 – Eleanor Holm
- August 28 – Frank Murphy
- September 4 – Winston Churchill
- September 11 – Edward Rydz-Śmigły
- September 18 – Joseph P. Kennedy
- September 25 – Walther von Brauchitsch
- October 2 – Arthur Vandenberg
- October 9 – Queen Elizabeth
- October 16 – Kaufman T. Keller
- October 23 – Cyril Newall, 1st Baron Newall
- October 30 – King Gustav V
- November 6 – Tom Harmon
- November 13 – King Carol II
- November 20 – George S. Kaufman
- November 27 – Queen Wilhelmina
- December 4 – Carl Sandburg
- December 11 – Nelson T. Johnson
- December 18 – Herbert Hoover
- December 25 – Vivien Leigh

Previous	Lists of covers of Time magazine	Next
1920s	1930s	1940s
