= List of presidents of Princeton University =

Head of Princeton University

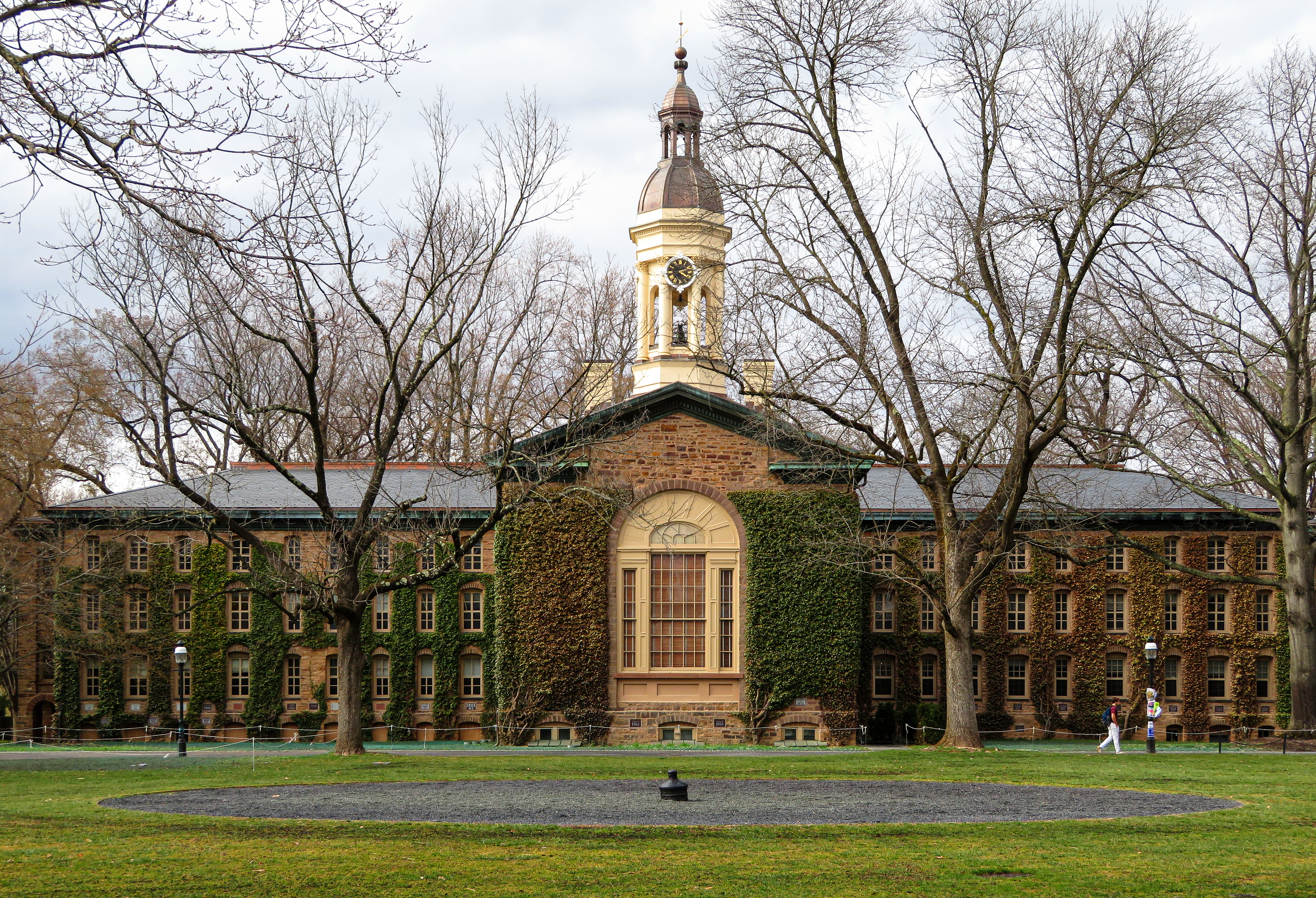
Nassau Hall houses the Office of the President.

Princeton University, founded in 1746 as the College of New Jersey, is a private Ivy League research university located in Princeton, New Jersey. The university is led by a president, who is selected by the board of trustees by ballot. The president is an ex officio member of the board and presides at its meetings. One of five officers of the university's legal corporation, the Trustees of Princeton University, the president also acts as the chief executive officer. The president is tasked with "general supervision of the interests of the University" and represents the institution in public. If the office is vacant, the board can either appoint an acting president, or the university's provost can serve in such capacity. The office was established in Princeton's original charter of 1746.

The institution's first president was Jonathan Dickinson in 1747, and its 20th and current is Christopher Eisgruber, who was elected in 2013. (Note: Although 25 people have held the office, Princeton University does not consider acting presidents in its counting; as a result, in official releases by the university, Christopher Eisgruber is considered the 20th president.) All of Princeton's presidents have been male besides Shirley Tilghman; all have been white. James Carnahan had the longest serving tenure at 31 years, and Jonathan Edwards had the shortest at five weeks. There have been six acting presidents, and eleven presidents who have been alumni of the university. Princeton presidents have a long association with the Presbyterian church, with every president before Woodrow Wilson in 1902 being a Presbyterian clergyman. The first nine presidents were slaveholders, with five holding slaves while living in the president's house. Thirteen of Princeton's seventeen deceased presidents are buried in President Lot of Princeton Cemetery. As of 2019, the salary of the president was $944,952.

The president's official residence has changed several times over the lifespan of the university. Built in 1756, the John Maclean House, also known as the President's House, was where the president lived until Prospect House was acquired in 1878. In 1968, the official residence switched again to Walter Lowrie House. The Office of the President is housed in Nassau Hall.

== Presidents ==
List of presidents
No.	President		Presidency	Notes	Ref.
1	Portrait of Jonathan Dickinson	Jonathan Dickinson	1747	Died shortly after entering office from a pleuritic illness	
2	Portrait of Aaron Burr Sr.	Aaron Burr Sr.	1748–1757 (Note: Burr was formally elected president in November 1748; however, he had been in charge since Dickinson's death in October 1747.)	Minister of the Presbyterian Church of Newark. Father of Aaron Burr, the third Vice President of the United States. Died from illness while in office.	
–	Seal of Princeton University	David Cowell	1757–1758	Served as acting president.	
3	Portrait of Jonathan Edwards	Jonathan Edwards	1758	Eminent theologian to the First Great Awakening. Died five weeks into office after a fever from a smallpox vaccine.	
–	Seal of Princeton University	Jacob Green	1758–1759	Delegate for Morris County to the Provincial Congress of New Jersey. Father of Ashbel Green, 8th president of the university. Served as acting president.	
4	Portrait of Samuel Davies	Samuel Davies	1759–1761	Died shortly after entering office from pneumonia	
5	Portrait of Samuel Finley	Samuel Finley	1761–1766	Founder of West Nottingham Academy; Minister of the Cold Spring Presbyterian Church. Graduate of the Log College. Died while in office in Philadelphia seeking medical treatment.	
–	Seal of Princeton University	John Blair	1767–1768	Graduate of the Log College. Served as acting president.	
6	Portrait of John Witherspoon	John Witherspoon	1768–1794	Signer of the Declaration of Independence; Delegate to the Second Continental Congress; Moderator of the first General Assembly of the Presbyterian Church in the United States of America. Died while in office.	
7	Portrait of Samuel S. Smith	Samuel S. Smith	1795–1812	First president of Hampden–Sydney College. College of New Jersey alumnus. Resigned after pressure from the university trustees and ongoing issues with the institution.	
8	Portrait of Ashbel Green	Ashbel Green	1812–1822	Third Chaplain of the United States House of Representatives. College of New Jersey alumnus. Resigned after his loss of confidence in the university trustees.	
–	Portrait of Philip Lindsley	Philip Lindsley	1822–1823	First president of the now-defunct University of Nashville. College of New Jersey alumnus. Served as acting president.	
9	Portrait of James Carnahan	James Carnahan	1823–1854	One of the founders of the Chi Phi fraternity. College of New Jersey alumnus.	
10	Portrait of John Maclean Jr.	John Maclean Jr.	1854–1868	College of New Jersey alumnus	
11	Portrait of James McCosh	James McCosh	1868–1888		
12	Portrait of Francis L. Patton	Francis L. Patton	1888–1902	Resigned after pressure from university trustees due to dissatisfaction with his lackluster administration style.	
13	Portrait of Woodrow Wilson	Woodrow Wilson	1902–1910	28th President of the United States; 34th Governor of New Jersey. College of New Jersey alumnus.	
–	Portrait of John Aikman Stewart	John A. Stewart	1910–1912	Served as acting president	
14	Portrait of John G. Hibben	John G. Hibben	1912–1932	College of New Jersey alumnus	
–	Seal of Princeton University	Edward D. Duffield	1932–1933	Served as acting president	
15	Portrait of Harold W. Dodds	Harold W. Dodds	1933–1957	President of the National Municipal League. Princeton alumnus.	
16	Seal of Princeton University	Robert F. Goheen	1957–1972	United States Ambassador to India. Princeton alumnus.	
17	Seal of Princeton University	William G. Bowen	1972–1988	President of the Andrew W. Mellon Foundation. Princeton alumnus.	
18	Portrait of Harold T. Shapiro	Harold T. Shapiro	1988–2001	10th President of the University of Michigan. Princeton alumnus.	
19	Portrait of Shirley M. Tilghman	Shirley M. Tilghman	2001–2013	First female president of Princeton University	
20	Portrait of Christopher L. Eisgruber	Christopher L. Eisgruber	2013–present	Princeton alumnus	

== See also ==
- List of Princeton University people
- History of Princeton University
