= American Peace Centenary Committee =

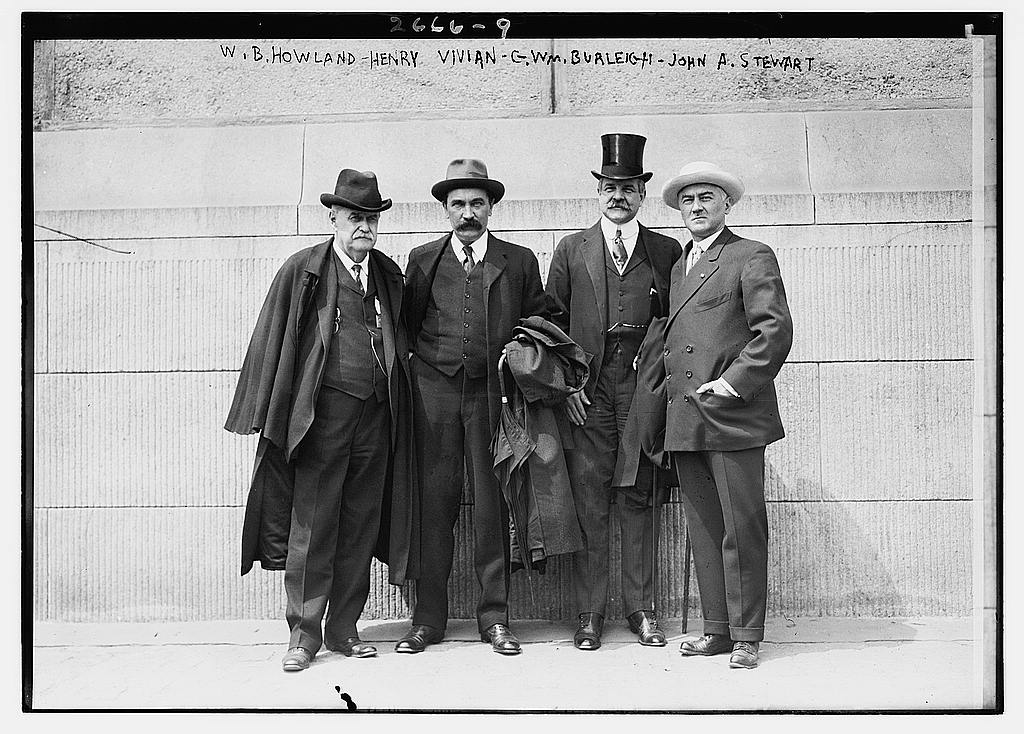
William Bailey Howland, Henry Vivian, George William Burleigh, and John Aikman Stewart of the American Peace Centenary Committee circa 1913

The American Peace Centenary Committee was formed during the 1909 centennial of Abraham Lincoln's birth. In 1913, they made the decision to mark the anniversary of the ratification of the Treaty of Ghent in 1915 which ended the War of 1812.

== Members ==
=== British ===
- Arthur Conan Doyle, honorary member
- Earl Gray, president

=== American ===
- William Bailey Howland
- John Aikman Stewart, chairman

== Publications ==
- General prospectus of the project to celebrate the centenary of the signing of the Treaty of Ghent, which established lasting peace between America and Great Britain; as well as the plan to signalize in fitting manner, the peace which has existed between the United States, Great Britain and other nations
