= James Carnahan =

American clergyman and academic administrator

The Reverend James Carnahan
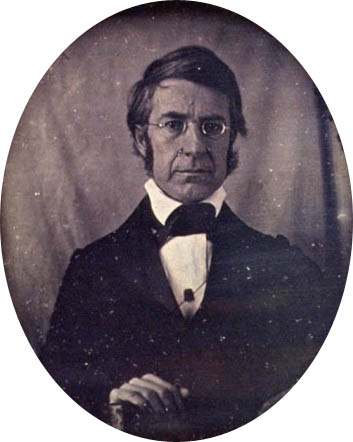

9th President of Princeton University
- In office 1823–1854
- Preceded by: Philip Lindsley (acting)
- Succeeded by: John Maclean, Jr.

Personal details
- Born: November 15, 1775 Cumberland County, Province of Pennsylvania
- Died: March 2, 1859 (aged 83) Newark, New Jersey
- Education: Princeton University

James Carnahan (November 15, 1775 – March 2, 1859) was an American clergyman and educator who served as the ninth President of Princeton University.

Born in Cumberland County, Pennsylvania, Carnahan was an 1800 graduate of the school when it was called College of New Jersey. He held positions at churches in New Jersey and New York until moving to Georgetown, District of Columbia in 1814 to teach school for nine years.

Alongside John McMillan, Samuel Miller, James Mountain, John Watson, he was one of the earliest instructors and leaders of Canonsburg Academy (later Jefferson College and now Washington & Jefferson College). He was one of the founders of the Franklin Literary Society at Jefferson College.

He took the President of Princeton University position in 1823. In 1824, he helped to create the Chi Phi Society, a semi-religious, semi-literary organization, which ceased activity the following year when it merged with the Philadelphian Society. During his tenure, enrollment increased from 70 to 250. After retiring in 1854, Carnahan served as a trustee of the college and as president of the board of trustees of the Theological Seminary. He died in Newark, New Jersey.
