= James McCosh =

British philosopher (1811–1894)

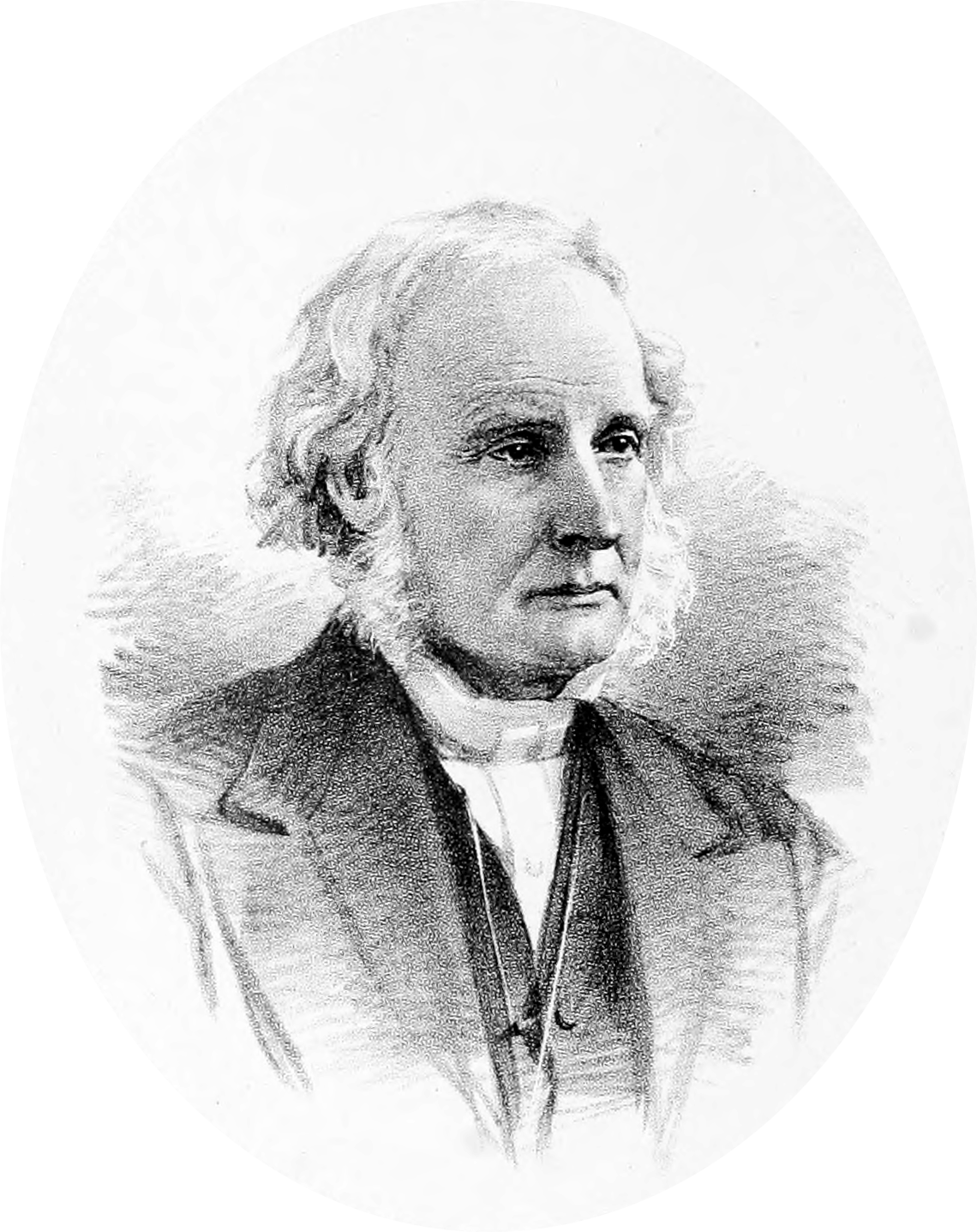

11th President of Princeton University
- In office 1868–1888
- Preceded by: John Maclean, Jr.
- Succeeded by: Francis Landey Patton

Personal details
- Born: April 1, 1811 Ayrshire, Scotland
- Died: November 16, 1894 (aged 83) Princeton, New Jersey
- Children: A. J. McCosh
- Education: Princeton University University of Glasgow University of Edinburgh

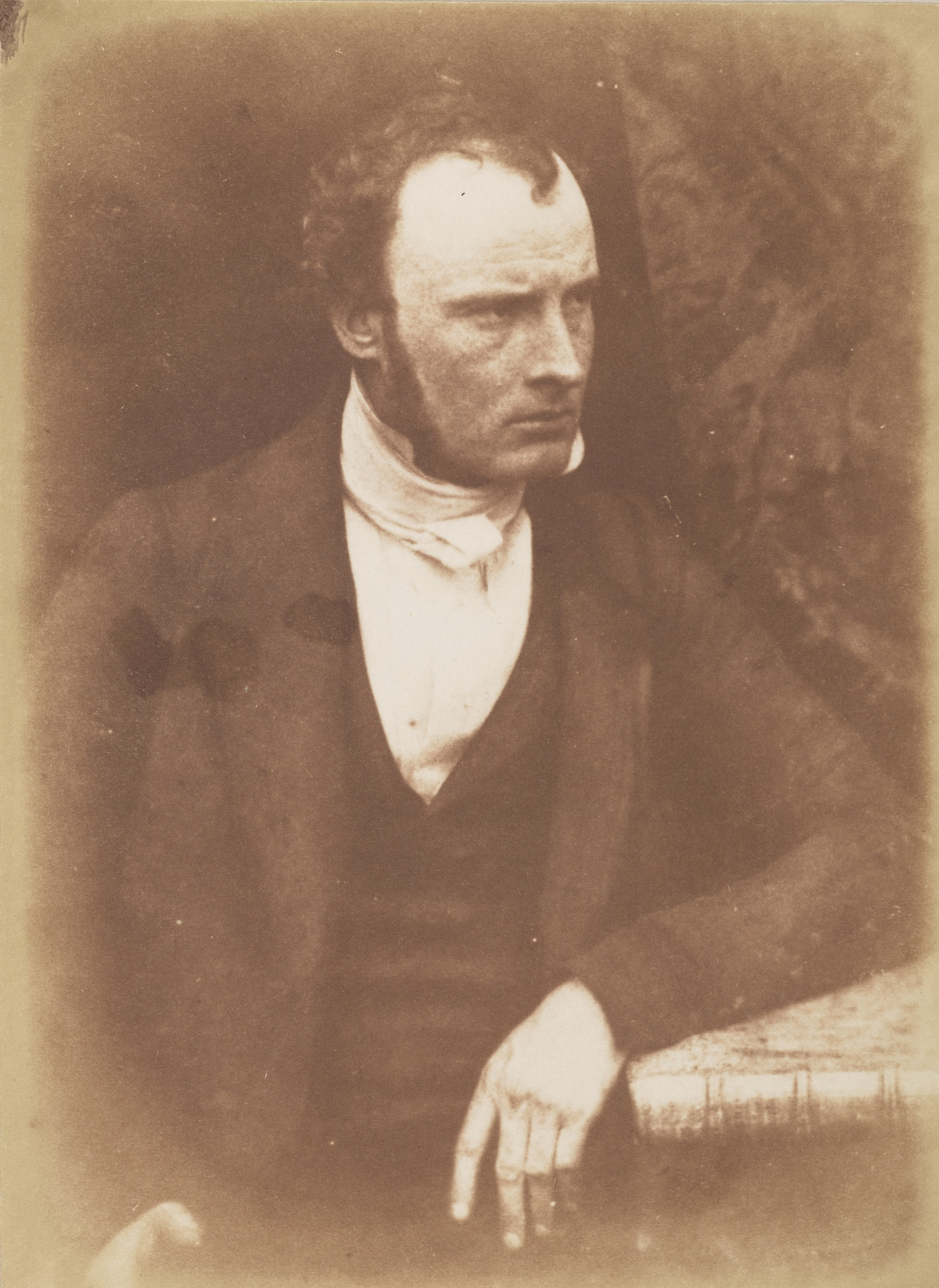
James McCosh by Hill & Adamson

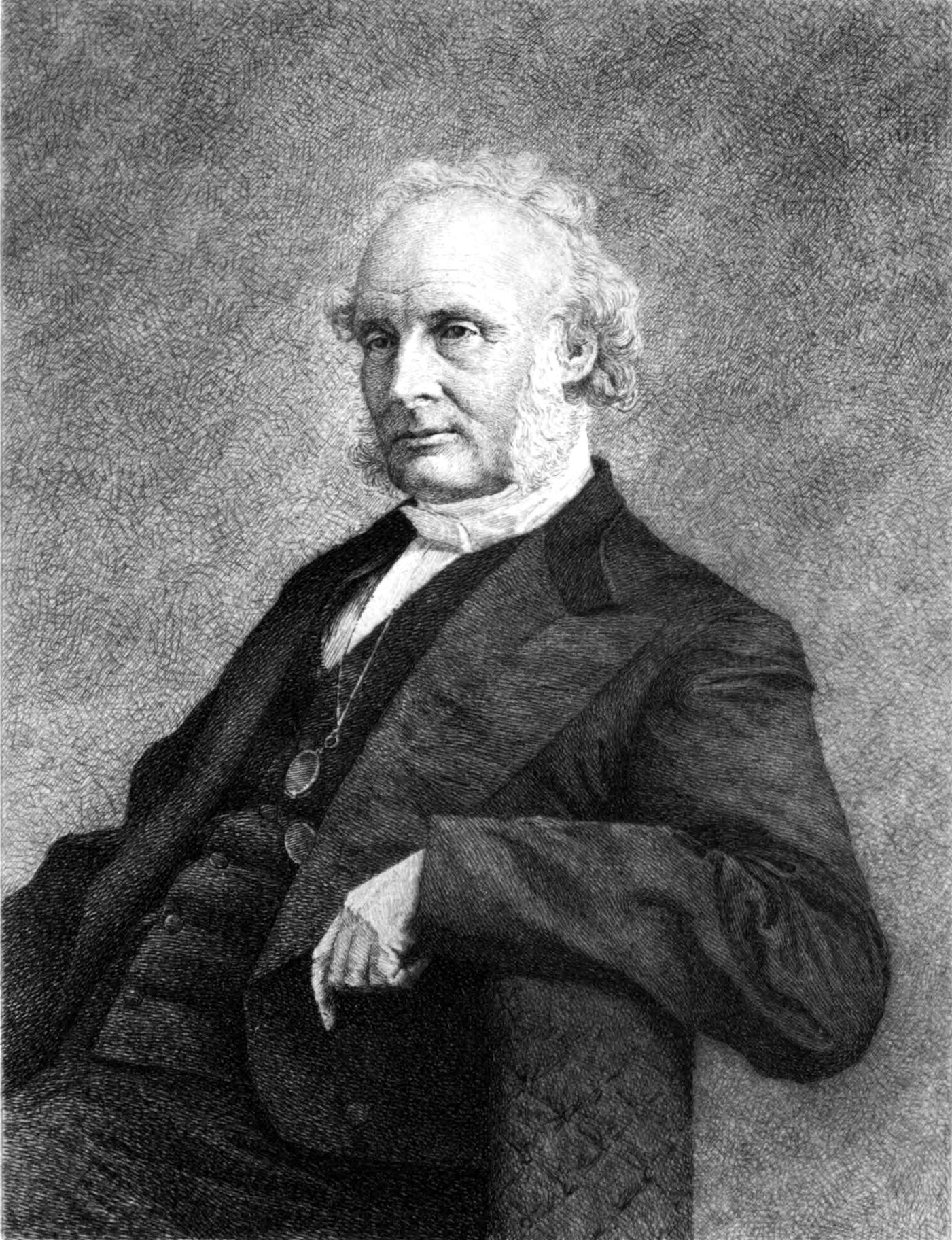
James McCosh seated

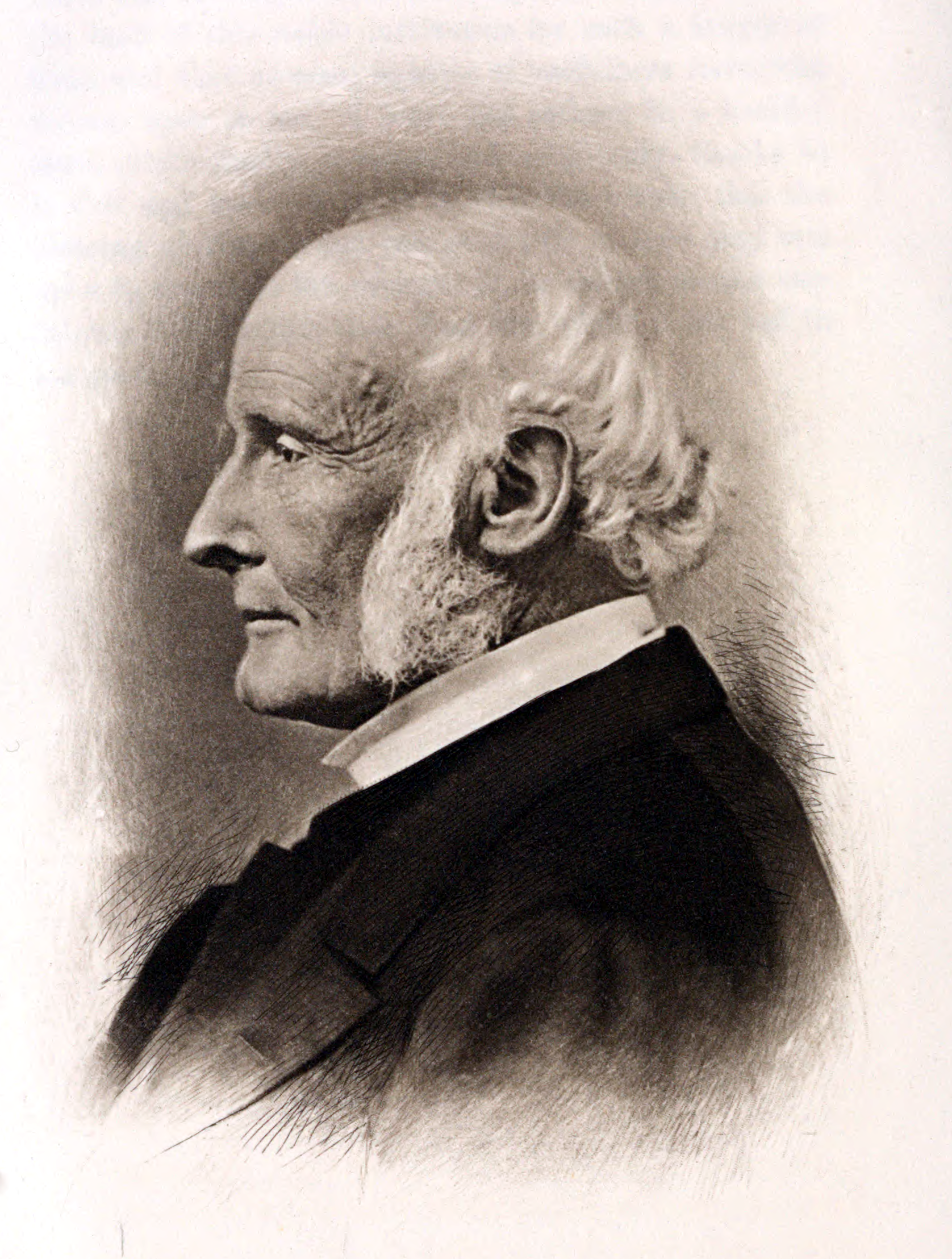
James McCosh from a photograph taken in 1892

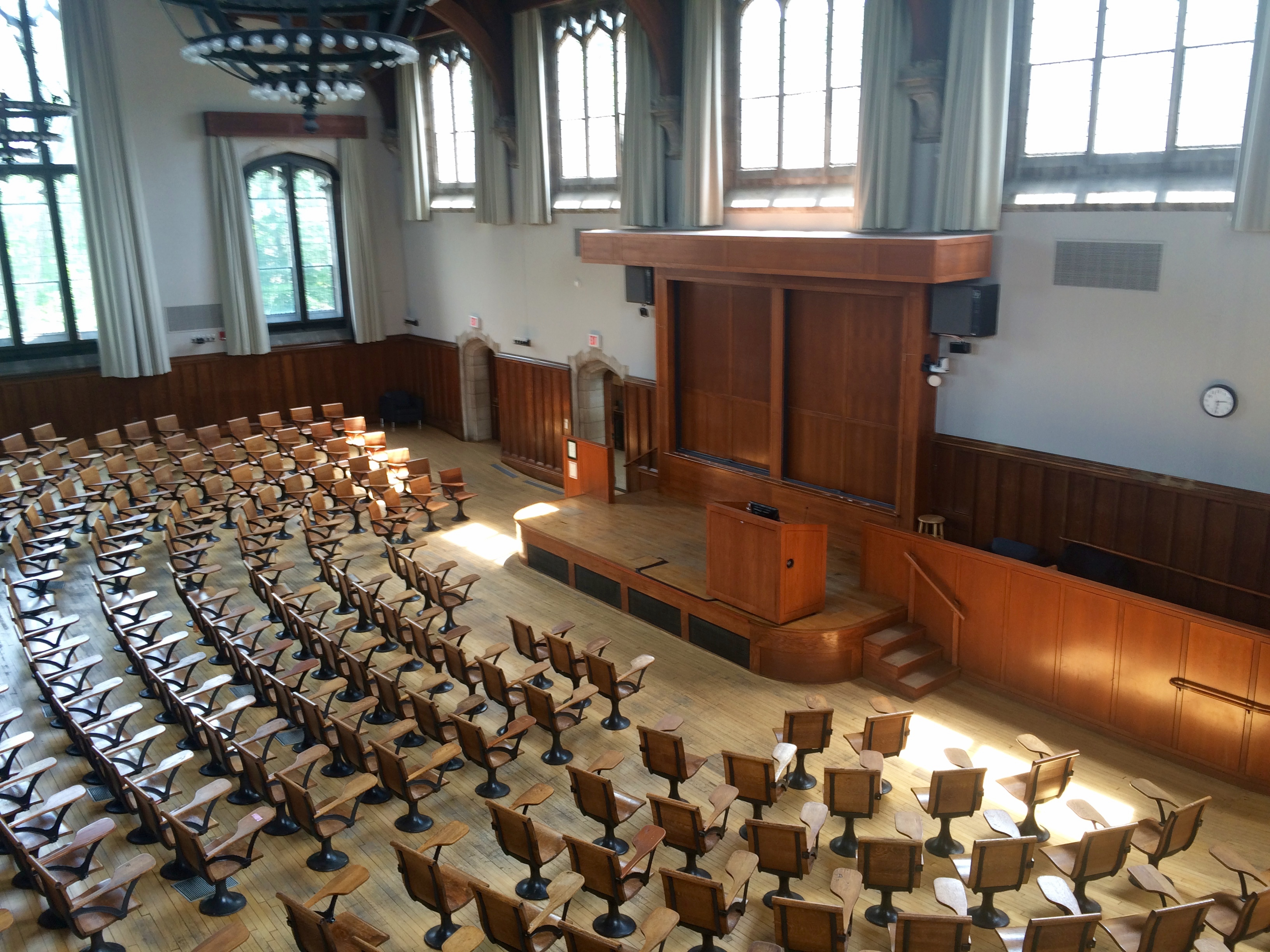
A lecture room in McCosh Hall at Princeton University

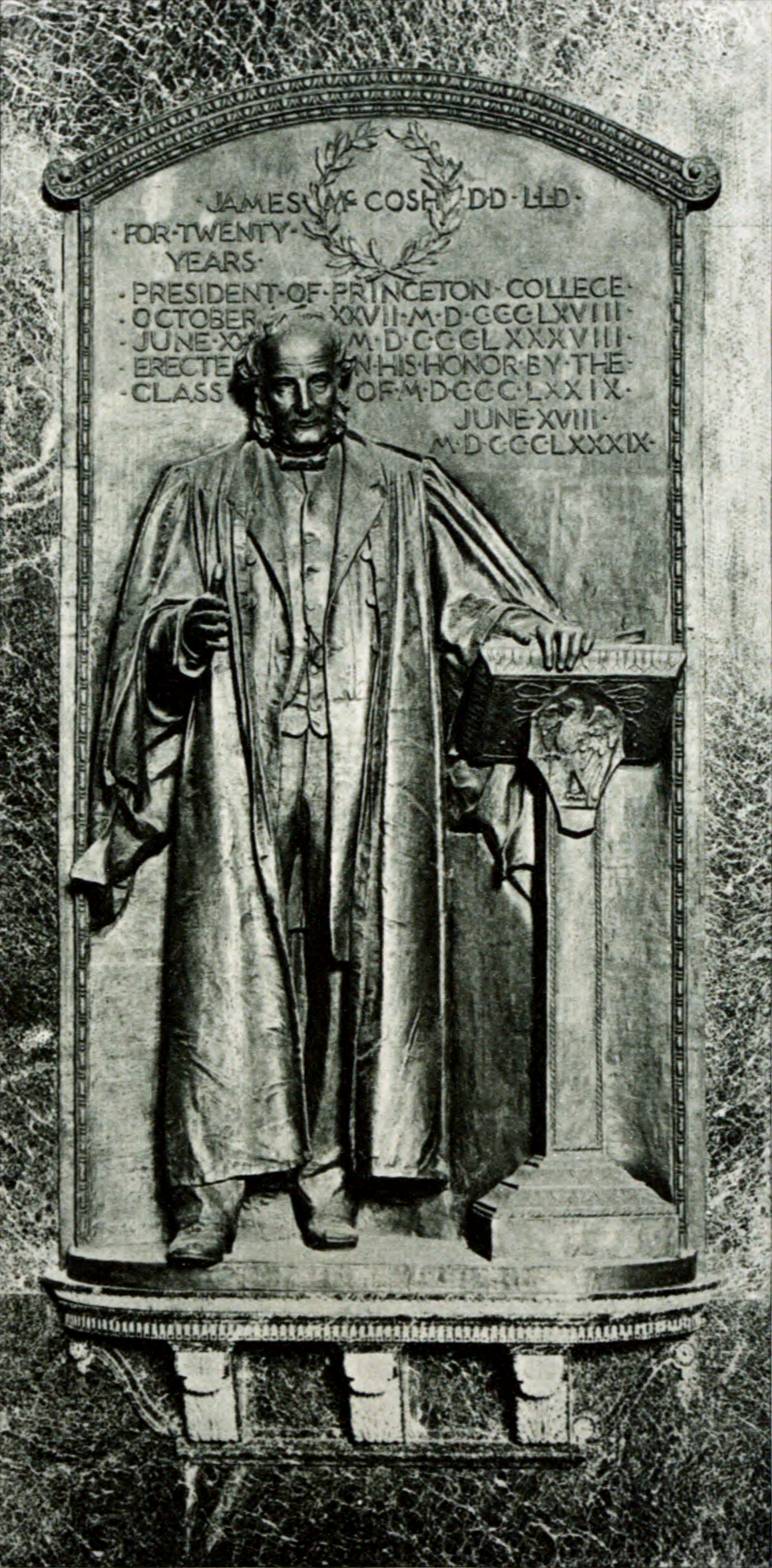
James McCosh sculptured plaque

James McCosh (April 1, 1811 – November 16, 1894) was a philosopher of the Scottish School of Common Sense. He was president of Princeton University 1868–88.

== Biography ==
McCosh was born into a Covenanting family in Ayrshire, and studied at the Universities of Glasgow and Edinburgh, obtaining his M.A. at the latter, at the suggestion of Sir William Hamilton, for an essay on stoicism. He became a minister of the Church of Scotland in 1834, serving as minister first at Abbey Church in Arbroath and then at Brechin. He sided with the Free Church of Scotland in the Disruption of 1843, becoming minister at Brechin's new East Free Church. In 1850 or 1851 he was appointed Professor of Logic and Metaphysics at Queen's College, Belfast (now Queen's University Belfast).

In 1868 he travelled to the United States to become president of the College of New Jersey (now Princeton University). He resigned the presidency in 1888, but continued to teach philosophy until his death. McCosh Hall (home of the English department) and a cross-campus walkway are named in his honor. The campus infirmary is named after his wife, Isabella McCosh. A school on the South Side of Chicago was named after him, but has since been renamed the Emmett Louis Till Math & Science Academy.

He was immortalised by William Makepeace Thackeray in the ballad of "The Last Irish Grievance".

== Philosophical work ==
McCosh's position was mainly in the tradition of Thomas Reid and other Scottish common-sense philosophers. He denied that our beliefs about the nature of the external world rest on causal or other inferences from perceptual ideas, but held that they are the direct accompaniments of sensation, and thus not open to question. He also argued for the a priori nature of fundamental principles such as those of causality and morality. Our judgements and other cognitions are regulated by such principles, though that is not to say that everyone is aware of them; they can be reached through reflection on our experience, when they are recognised as self-evidently necessary. In his moral theory, especially, McCosh differed from many of his contemporaries in being relatively uninfluenced by Kant.

== Evolution ==
McCosh's most original work concerned the attempt to reconcile evolution and Christianity. In 1874, Charles Hodge, the theologian and intellectual leader at the Presbyterian Seminary in Princeton, published What is Darwinism?, claiming that Darwinism, was, in essence, atheism. To Hodge, Darwinism was contrary to the notion of design and was therefore clearly atheistic. Hodge's views determined the position of the Seminary until his death in 1878. Hodge simply refused to accept that natural laws alone could create complex organisms that fit into their niches so perfectly and that evolution could explain origins. While he did not consider all evolutionary ideas to be in conflict with his religion, he was concerned with its teaching in colleges. Meanwhile at the college across town (a totally separate institution) President John Maclean also rejected Darwin's theory of evolution. However in 1868, McCosh became president at the college.

McCosh realized that much of Darwinism could and would be proved sound, and so he strove to prepare Christians for this event. Instead of conflict between science and religion, McCosh sought reconciliation. Insisting on the principle of design in nature, McCosh interpreted the Darwinian discoveries as more evidence of the prearrangement, skill, and purpose in the universe. He thus demonstrated that Darwinism was not atheistic nor in irreconcilable hostility to the Bible. McCosh thus argued that evolution, far from being inconsistent with belief in divine design, glorifies the divine designer (see for example his Christianity and Positivism), believing nature was entirely interconnected by natural laws God was immanent with.

This aspect of his work found popularity among most Presbyterian clergy, who found his arguments useful in their attempts to cope with scientific philosophy. The Presbyterians in America thus could choose between two schools of thought on evolution, both based in Princeton. The Seminary held to Hodge's position until his supporters were ousted in 1929, and the college (Princeton University) became a world class center of the new science of evolutionary biology.

The debate between McCosh as president of the college and Charles Hodge, head of Princeton Seminary, during the late 1860s and 1870s exemplified the classic conflict between science and religion over the question of Darwin's evolution theory. McCosh offered the first public endorsement of evolution by an American religious leader. However, the two men showed greater similarities regarding matters of science and religion than popularly appreciated. Both supported the increasing role of scientific inquiry in natural history and resisted its intrusion into philosophy and religion. The debate vitalized the college.

He was elected as a member to the American Philosophical Society in 1871.

== Works ==
- The Wheat and the Chaff gathered into Bundles: a Statistical Contribution towards the History of the Recent Disruption of the Scottish Ecclesiastical Establishment (Perth, 1843)
- Does the Established Church acknowledge Christ as its Head ? (Brechin, 1846)
- A Tribute to the Memory of Dr Chalmers, by a Former Pupil (Brechin, 1847)
- The Method of the Divine Government, Physical and Moral (Edinburgh, 1850, last ed., New York, 1874)
- The Ulster Revival and its Physiological Accidents (Belfast) [1859]
- The Intuitions of the Mind Inductively Investigated (London, 1860, 1865; New York, 1872)
- The Supernatural in relation to the Natural (Cambridge, Belfast, and New York, 1862)
- Supplement to Dugald Stewart's "Outlines of Moral Philosophy" (1865)
- An Examination of Mr J. S. Mill's Philosophy, being a Defence of Fundamental Truth (London, 1866 and 1886; New York, 1875 and 1880)
- Philosophical Papers — I., Examination of Sir William Hamilton's Logic; II., Reply to Mr Mill's Third Edition; III., Present State of Moral Philosophy in Britain (London, 1868; New York, 1869)
- The Laws of Discursive Thought (London and New York, 1870–90)
- Christianity and Positivism : a Series of Lectures on Natural Theology and Apologetics (London and New York, 1871-5)
- The Scottish Philosophy: Biographical, Expository, Critical, from Hutcheson to Hamilton (London, 1874; New York, 1880)
- Ideas in Nature overlooked by Dr Tyndall (New York, 1875)
- The Development Hypothesis : is it sufficient? (New York, 1876)
- The Emotions (London and New York, 1880)
- The Conflicts of the Age (New York, 1881)
- Psychology: the Motive Powers — Emotions, Conscience, Will (London and New York, 1887)
- Realistic Philosophy Defended in a Philosophic Series (London and New York, 1887)
- The Religious Aspect of Evolution, the Bedell Lectures for 1887 (New York, 1888–90)
- First and Fundamental Truths (London and New York, 1889)
- Psychology : the Cognitive Powers (London and New York, 1889–91)
- The Tests of Various Kinds of Truths (Merrick Lectures) (New York and Cincinnati, 1889–91)
- The Prevailing Types of Philosophy : can they reach Reality logically? (New York, 1890)
- Our Moral Nature (New York, 1892)
- [jointly with Dr George Dickie] Typical Forms and Special Ends in Creation (Edinburgh, 1855; London, 1862; New York, 1880)
- and a very large number of contributions to periodical literature.
- For a complete list of his writings see Joseph Heatly Dulles, McCosh Bibliography (Princeton, 1895).

=== Main works ===
- The Method of Divine Government, Physical and Moral (Edinburgh, 1850, 5th ed., 1856, and frequently republished in New York)
- The Typical Forms and Special Ends in Creation (Edinburgh, 1855; New York, 1856)
- Intuitions of the Mind Inductively Investigated (London and New York, 1860; 3rd rev. ed., 1872)
- An Examination of Mr J. S. Mill's Philosophy (London and New York, 1866; enlarged 1871, several editions)
- Dr. McCosh's Logic: Laws of Discursive Thought, Being a Text-Book of Formal Logic (Robert Carter & Brothers, 1885)
- Philosophical Papers containing (1)"Examination of Sir W. Hamilton's Logic", (2)"Reply to Mr Mill's third edition", and (3) "Present State of Moral Philosophy in Britain".
- First and Fundamental Truths: Being a Treatise on Metaphysics (New York, Charles Scribner's Sons, 1889)
- The Religious Aspect of Evolution (New York, 1888, 2nd ed., 1890).

== Family ==
He married 29 September 1845, Isabella (died 12 November 1909), daughter of Alexander Guthrie, surgeon, Brechin, and had issue —

- Mary Jane, born 5 July 1846
- Andrew, born 15 April 1848, died 15 October 1849
- Alexander Guthrie, born 16 January 1850
- Margaret Sarah, born 21 June 1852
- Andrew James, born 15 March 1858.

Academic offices
Preceded by John Maclean, Jr.	President of the College of New Jersey; 1868–1888	Succeeded by Francis Landey Patton
