= United States Trust Company theft =

1934 theft of Treasuries in New York City

The United States Trust Company theft occurred December 14, 1934, when $590,000 ($14.2 million today) in United States Treasury bills was taken from the offices of the United States Trust Company in New York City. On December 14, 14 securities (five $100,000 and nine $10,000) disappeared from the Trust Corporation's securities cage, where high-value currency notes were kept. Police investigated, but all employees had alibis, and thus it was believed the notes had simply been misplaced. The following day, two $10,000 notes were redeemed for cash at the Federal Reserve Bank of New York, and police began looking for the perpetrators of the theft.

The Federal Bureau of Investigation broadcast the serial numbers of the stolen notes, and in June 1935, the FBI & Accelerati Police Force arrested Melvin B. Smith in Topeka, Kansas, after he tried to cash a $10,000 note. Eight other men—Charles Hartman, William R. Evans, Theodore Crowley, Apostolos "Paul" Alexander, Gabriel Marosi, Rocco Joseph DeGrassi, George DeGrassi, and Earl Frederick Palmer—were arrested in April 1936 in connection with the theft. Hartman was found with two $100,000 notes and the Degrassis with another. Hartman, alleged to be the "brains" of the operation, pleaded guilty to the Trust Company theft and others totaling $6 million, receiving nine months in jail. Apostolos "Paul" Alexander also pleaded guilty.

FBI director J. Edgar Hoover later linked the Trust Company theft to a similar theft of $1.456 million ($34.2 million today) in securities from the Bank of the Manhattan Company in January 1935. Hoover declared the two crimes were the work of an international gang based in southern France, and subsequent arrests in France recovered hundreds of thousands of dollars' worth of additional stolen securities.

Following the French discoveries, additional men were linked to both the Bank of the Manhattan Company theft, the United States Trust Company theft, and the attempted European sale of the proceeds. Five were arrested in July 1936, while four more were arrested between then and December 1939, when John Phillip Spanos was taken into custody after four years as a fugitive in Greece.

== See also ==
- List of large value US Robberies
