= George Frederick Warren Jr. =

Economist (1874–1938)

- Born: February 16, 1874; Clay County, Nebraska, US
- Died: May 24, 1938 (aged 64); Ithaca, New York, US
- Resting place: East Lawn Cemetery, Ithaca, New York
- Education: Ph.D., 1905, Cornell University, Ithaca, New York

George Frederick Warren Jr. (February 16, 1874 – May 24, 1938) was an agricultural economist who became an advisor to President Franklin D. Roosevelt. He was (according to Liaquat Ahamed) central to Roosevelt's momentous decision to take the United States off the gold standard.

Warren published extensively; the published works included in this stub are only a part of what is in WorldCat.

His papers are archived at the Mann Library at Cornell University. A short biography appears at nebraskaauthors.org. His picture appeared on the cover of Time on November 27, 1933.

== Published works ==
- Warren, George F (1935). Elements of Agriculture. New York: Macmillan Company.
- Warren, George F; Livermore, K. C (1917). Laboratory Exercises in Farm Management. New York: Macmillan Co.
- Warren, George F (1924). Agricultural Situation: Economic Effects of Fluctuating Prices.
- Warren, George F; Pearson, Frank A; American Economic Association (1933). Some Statistics On the Gold Situation. Philadelphia, Pa.: American Economic Assoc.
- Warren, George F; Pearson, Frank A (1927). Interrelationships of Supply and Price. Ithaca, New York: Cornell University, Agricultural Experiment Station.
- Warren, George F; Pearson, Frank A (1932). The Physical Volume of Production in the United States. Ithaca, New York: Cornell University.
- Warren, George Frederick; Pearson, Frank Ashmore; Stoker, Herman M (1932). Wholesale Prices for 213 years, 1720 to 1932; Warren, G[eorge] F[rederick]; P. 1. Wholesale Prices in the U.S. for 135 years, 1797 to 1932. G.F. Warren and F[rank] A[shmore] Pearson. P. 2. Wholesale Prices at New York city, 1720 to 1800. Herman M. Stoker. Ithaca, New York.
- Warren, George F; Pearson, Frank A (1937). World Prices and the Building Industry: Index Numbers of Prices of 40 Basic Commodities for 14 Countries in Currency and in Gold, and Material On the Building Industry. New York; London: Wiley; Chapman & Hall.
- Warren, George F; Pearson, Frank A (1934). Prices. New York; London: J. Wiley & Sons Chapman & Hall.
