= Bank of America Private Bank =

Bank in New York, US (founded 1853)

- Formerly: United States Trust Company of New York, or U.S. Trust (1853–2007)
- Type: Subsidiary
- Industry: Private banking Wealth management
- Founded: 1853; 173 years ago
- Headquarters: New York City
- Number of locations: 100+
- Area served: United States
- Products: Financial services
- Parent: Bank of America
- Website: www.privatebank.bankofamerica.com

Bank of America Private Bank (formerly U.S. Trust) was founded in 1853 as the United States Trust Company of New York. It operated independently until 2000, when it was acquired by Charles Schwab, and Co. and subsequently sold to, and became a subsidiary of, Bank of America in 2007. Bank of America Private Bank provides investment management, wealth structuring, and credit and lending services to clients.

== History ==
U.S. Trust was established in 1853 and received a charter from the State of New York. It is the first and oldest trust company in the United States. The venture was backed by a group of wealthy men who invested $1 million in the company, at the time named United States Trust Company of New York. The inaugural board of trustees included thirty prominent New Yorkers. Among the founding investors were Cornelius Lawrence of the Bank of the State of New York and then Mayor of New York who was appointed president, and John Aikman Stewart of the United States Life Insurance Company of New York who assumed the role of Secretary. Other founders included inventor, philanthropist and industrialist Peter Cooper, department store founder Marshall Field, Shepherd Knapp, president of Mechanics National Bank of the City of New York, and railroad developer and iron and steel manufacturer Erastus Corning.

=== Adding Services ===
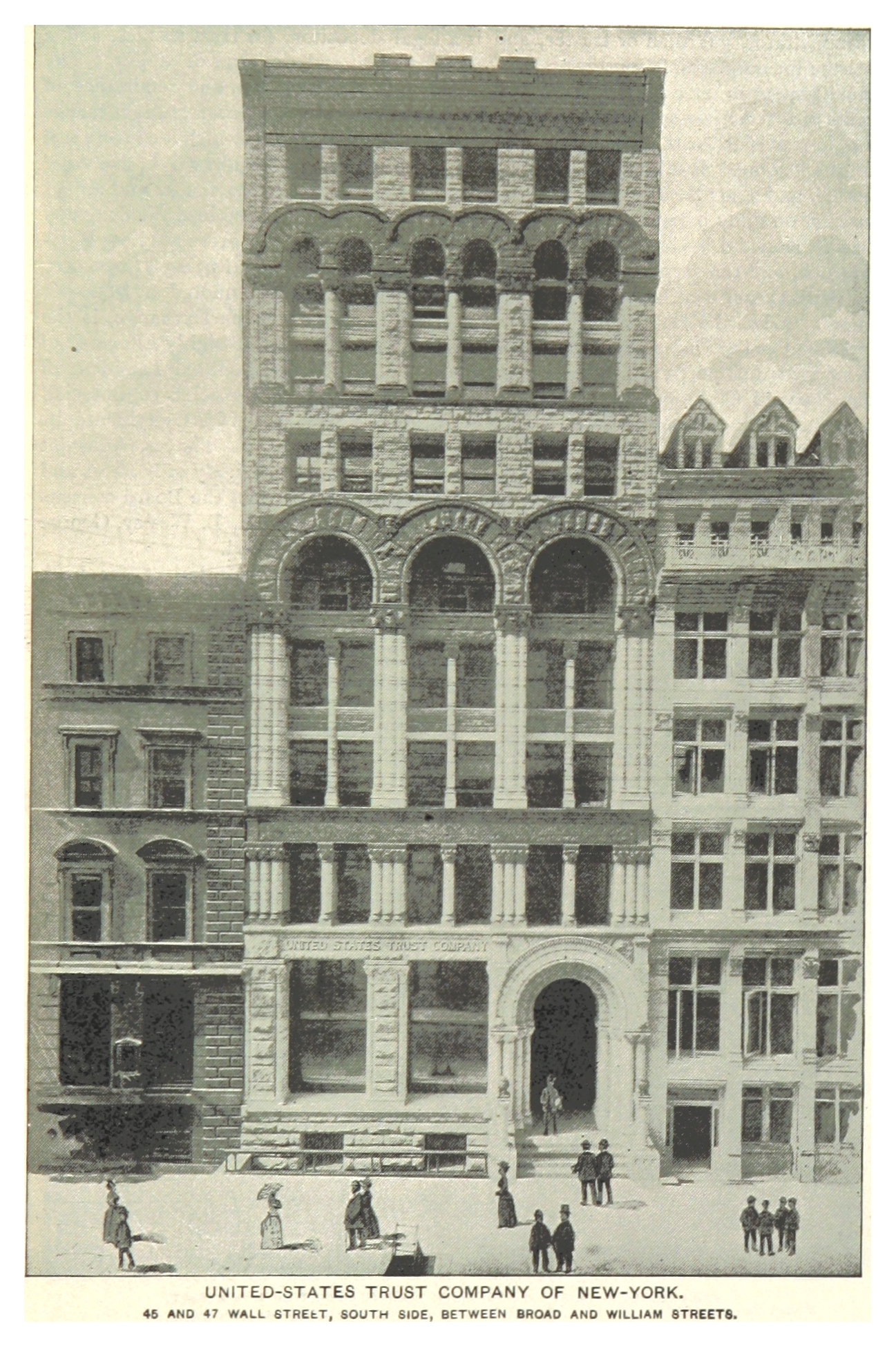
46 and 47 Wall Street, early 1890s

U.S. Trust was created as a financial company to serve both institutions and individuals by acting as executor and trustee of their funds. At a time when trusts were rare, the concept was innovative. By 1886 the company had established itself as a reputable and stable financial institution.

In the mid-1800s, U.S. Trust had a list of wealthy clients and played a role in major construction projects including railroads and the Panama Canal. Many of the company's corporate clients issued securities to finance these initiatives, allowing U.S. Trust to serve as corporate trustee. The boom in industry and enterprise also helped to grow U.S. Trust's business in managing personal trusts. In the 1880s and 90s U.S. Trust clients included William Waldorf Astor, Jay Gould and Oliver Harriman.

U.S. Trust withstood a number of financial crises throughout the latter half of the 1800s and into the 1900s. By 1928 it had more than $1 billion in trusted assets and led competitors by a considerable margin. An emphasis on stability helped it navigate the Wall Street Crash of 1929 and subsequent depression, though a late 1934 theft of treasury bills by a French-based crime syndicate attracted federal attention, though its employees were fully exonerated from any role in the crime. The company began to introduce more personalized services including advising clients on schools and careers for their children. In 1958 U.S. Trust launched its first advertisements in society pages of newspapers, The New Yorker and the programs of the Metropolitan Opera and the New York Philharmonic Society.

=== Restructuring in the 1970s, 80s and 90s ===
U.S. Trust continued to grow through the 1960s and into the early 1970s. By 1965, 85% of the company's gross income was coming from trust and investment operations and estate administration. Banking operations emerged as an opportunity and the firm began selling investment services to banks and insurance companies, helping them manage their growing deposits. This shift had a large impact on U.S. Trust and by 1977 banking made up 50% of the company's earnings.

By the latter half of the 1970s, profits had declined and despite efforts to expand the firm's physical footprint, it lost large pension fund clients due to poor performance and an incident where municipal bond certificates worth $397 million disappeared from its vault. As a result, U.S. Trust stopped dealing in international lending, closed its Geneva and London branches and reduced privileges available to lower-asset-level clients (less than $2 million).

The 1980s represented a time of restructuring for U.S. Trust. This included the launch of a subsidiary, Financial Technologies International, to market and license computer software to financial institutions, the discontinuation of business and real estate lending and the sale of its commercial, industrial and real estate portfolios valued at $275 million. In 1986, U.S. Trust was ranked behind trust competitors in assets under management and trust income. In 1987 it dropped the account minimum from $1–2 million in liquid assets to $250,000. U.S. Trust expanded its geographic presence throughout the 1990s by opening new offices and acquiring others across the continental United States.

=== Charles Schwab and Bank of America ===
U.S. Trust was acquired in May 2000 for $2.7 billion in stock, making it a wholly owned subsidiary of Charles Schwab & Co. David Pottruck, CEO of Charles Schwab at the time, pursued the acquisition to broaden the firm's wealth management platform and stop client outflow to bigger wealth management firms like Merrill Lynch and Morgan Stanley. Efforts to integrate the exclusive U.S. Trust into the discount-broker Schwab yielded a culture clash that ultimately undermined the merger. Schwab agreed to sell U.S. Trust to Bank of America for $3.3 billion in cash in November 2006. The acquisition of U.S. Trust was completed in 2007 and significantly strengthened Bank of America's position in the private banking business and its ability to cater to some of the nation's wealthiest clients. Keith Banks became president of U.S. Trust in 2008. On July 13, 2000, U.S. Trust Corporation was issued a "cease and desist" order directing U.S. Trust to strengthen money laundering policies relating to the Bank Secrecy Act. The order also included a fine of ten million dollars.

== Services ==
U.S. Trust offers resources and customized services to help meet clients' wealth structuring, investment management, banking and credit needs. Clients are served by teams of advisors offering a range of financial services, including investment management, financial and succession planning, philanthropic and specialty asset management, family office services, custom credit services, financial administration and family trust stewardship.

== Locations ==
U.S. Trust headquarters is located at 114 West 47th Street, New York City, NY, United States. The company has over 100 offices in the United States in 31 states and Washington, D.C.
