= Edward F. McGrady =

American labor leader from Massachusetts

McGrady in 1938

Edward Francis McGrady (January 22, 1873 – July 17, 1960) was an American labor leader and politician. A member of the Massachusetts House of Representatives during the first decade of the 20th century, McGrady is best remembered as a vice president of the American Federation of Labor and as first assistant secretary of labor during the administration of Franklin D. Roosevelt.

== Biography ==
=== Early years ===
Edward Francis McGrady was born in Jersey City, New Jersey, on January 22, 1873. McGrady graduated from the English High School of Boston. In 1894, after a brief stint in banking, he began his career as a newspaper pressman. He was a member of Web Pressmen's Union No. 3, and served as president of the Boston Central Labor Union, Massachusetts State Federation of Labor, and Newspaper Printing Pressmen's.

=== Start in politics ===
From 1902 to 1903, McGrady served on the Boston City Council. He had previously spent two years on the ward committee.

In 1905, he served in the Massachusetts state House of Representatives. He represented the thirteenth Suffolk district. He served on the committee on parishes and religious societies.

McGrady supported the Progressive Party ticket for President in 1924.

=== American Federation of Labor ===
Edward McGrady served as vice president of the American Federation of Labor. He then served for 14 years as the A.F. of L.'s legislative representative. In August 1929, he was awarded the Loyal Legion Decoration. He was quoted as saying, in the spring of 1932, "There are another two B's besides balancing the Budget, and that is to provide bread and butter."

=== Assistant Secretary of Labor ===
In 1932, McGrady reportedly was a supporter of Franklin Delano Roosevelt's candidacy for president before the Democratic National Convention in Chicago. Subsequently, he became the chief deputy administrator in charge of labor relations of the National Recovery Administration, under General Hugh S. Johnson.

In 1933, McGrady was appointed First Assistant Secretary of Labor under Frances Perkins. He became the Labor Department's chief conciliator in labor disputes. During this time he traveled 165,000 miles by plane. He officiated in the General Motors, Seamen's, A&P, and Toledo general strikes. He is credited as having originated the Toledo industrial peace plan, and in 1938 he published "How Peace Came to Toledo" in The Atlantic. As assistant secretary of labor, McGrady also served on the Federal Steel Mediation Board, the Interdepartmental Committee to Coordinate Health and Welfare Activities, and the National Longshoremen's Board.

=== To the private sector ===
A well-known figure at this point (having appeared on the cover of Time magazine on November 23, 1936), McGrady left his post in September 1937. Shortly thereafter he joined the Radio Corporation of America, and was vice president in charge of their labor relations. He appeared at FCC hearings regarding alleged monopolistic tendencies in the radio industry. He would remain in this position until 1951.

In 1938, McGrady was awarded the Industrial Peace Gold Medal by the American Arbitration Association.

=== Return to the Roosevelt administration ===
In 1941, McGrady became special labor consultant to Secretary of War Henry L. Stimson. In this capacity, he was appointed in December of that year to the National Patent Planning Commission. He remained in his role as expert consultant to Stimson until 1945.

McGrady was considered a leading candidate for Secretary of Labor early in the administration of President Harry S. Truman and was widely touted as such in the press.

=== Death and legacy ===
Edward McGrady died at his home in Newton, Massachusetts, on July 17, 1960, following a protracted illness. He was 89 years old at the time of his death.
