= John Maclean Jr. =

American Presbyterian clergyman and President of the College of New Jersey

The Reverend John Maclean Jr.
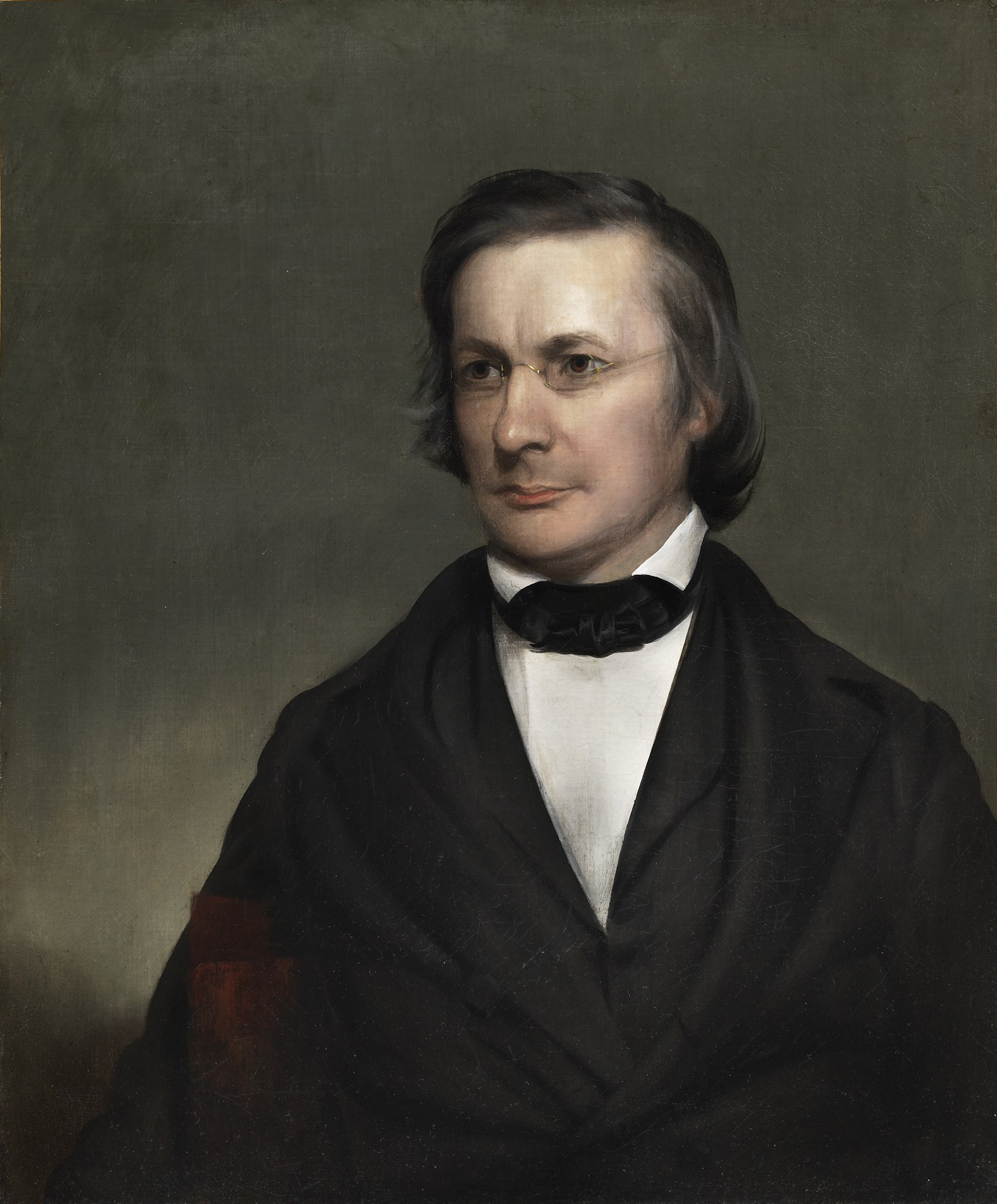

10th President of Princeton University
- In office 1854–1868
- Preceded by: James Carnahan
- Succeeded by: James McCosh

Personal details
- Born: March 3, 1800 Princeton, New Jersey
- Died: August 10, 1886 (aged 86) Princeton, New Jersey

John Maclean Jr., D.D. (March 3, 1800 – August 10, 1886) was an American Presbyterian clergyman and educator who served as the tenth President of Princeton University, then known as the College of New Jersey. Maclean, the son of the first professor of chemistry at the College of New Jersey, grew up in Princeton, New Jersey. He attended the College and later Princeton Theological Seminary. At age 23, he became full professor of mathematics at the university. Six years later, he became university vice president. He was responsible for bringing a number of renown scholars and academics to the college. During this time, he also left mathematics and became professor of ancient languages. Maclean was one of the chief architects of the state's public education system. His plan for a state normal school, local boards of education and nonsectarian public schools was adopted by the state legislature. He became president of the College of New Jersey in 1854. He led the university through the 1855 burning of Nassau Hall and the American Civil War. After retiring from his post after 14 years in office, he wrote a two-volume history of the university. He served as the honorary president of the university's Alumni Association until his death.

== Early life ==
Maclean Jr. was born in Princeton, New Jersey, as the son of John Maclean Sr., the first professor of chemistry at the College of New Jersey. He attended the College of New Jersey and graduated in 1816 as the youngest member of his class. He then spent the next two years earning his Doctor of Divinity degree from the Princeton Theological Seminary. Afterwards, he went back to the university and began as a tutor in Greek. He became a full professor of mathematics at age 23. In 1824, he helped to create the Chi Phi Society, a semi-religious, semi-literary organization, which ceased activity the following year when it merged with the Philadelphian Society.

== As vice president ==
In the late 1820s, Maclean devised a plan to enlarge and improve the faculty, in hopes of reversing the declining enrollment which had beleaguered the university over the last few years, to the point that university president James Carnahan considered shutting down the institution. Maclean's plan was accepted by the university's trustees in 1829, and he was subsequently named vice president. During his 25 years at that position, Maclean brought in a number of noted scholars to the institution, such as Joseph Henry, Arnold Henry Guyot, John Torrey, Stephen Alexander and Albert B. Dod. Maclean also shifted his professorship from mathematics to ancient languages until 1854, when he succeeded James Carnahan as the tenth president of the university.

== President of the university ==
During his 14-year tenure as president, Maclean led the university through some difficult times. In 1855, after Nassau Hall burned down, he sought the financial support of alumni and beneficiaries to contribute funds for rebuilding. He operated the college on a limited budget for five years and gave up part of his own salary to help rebuild the hall. The university lost a number of students who joined the Union and Confederate armies during the Civil War. Maclean kept the faculty together and managed a complete educational program for the students still attending the university. During the war Maclean, as voted by the board of trustees, conveyed an honorary Doctor of Laws degree to President Abraham Lincoln. Lincoln accepted, and wrote to Maclean that "[t]he assurance conveyed by this high compliment that the course of the government which I represent has received the approval of a body of gentlemen of such character and intelligence in this time of public trial is most grateful to me."

As president, Maclean witnessed the start of baseball at Princeton, heard the first rendition of the university alma mater, Old Nassau, and voted to make orange among the university's official colors.

== Other work ==
In 1828, Maclean gave an address, advocating for a public education system in New Jersey. He drew up a plan for a state normal school, local boards of education, and nonsectarian public schools. On the subject of religion and public education, Maclean stated:

There should be in no case the least interference with the rights of conscience, and no scholar should be required to attend to any lesson relating to morals or religion, to which his parents may be opposed.

The state legislature soon afterwards adopted his public education plan. Maclean also took interest in local churches. He served as a counselor, benefactor and organizer of the Witherspoon Street Presbyterian Church and the Second Presbyterian Church, which became known as "Doctor Maclean's Church". Maclean also was involved with the state's prisons. As a member of the New Jersey Prison Association, he conducted weekly services at the state penitentiary in Trenton.

== Retirement ==
After retiring from the university, Maclean's friends bought him a house, where he lived during the remainder of his life. In 1877, he wrote a two-volume history of the university entitled History of the College of New Jersey: From Its Origin in 1746 to the Commencement of 1854. He served as honorary president of the university's Alumni Association and attended an alumni commencement meeting in 1886, just six weeks before his death.

Maclean was honored with the naming of university's Maclean House, which has served as the office of the Alumni Council since 1968.

== Notes ==
Academic offices
Preceded by James Carnahan	President of the College of New Jersey; 1854-1868	Succeeded by James McCosh
