= John Grier Hibben =

American academic administrator (1861–1933)

The Reverend John Grier Hibben
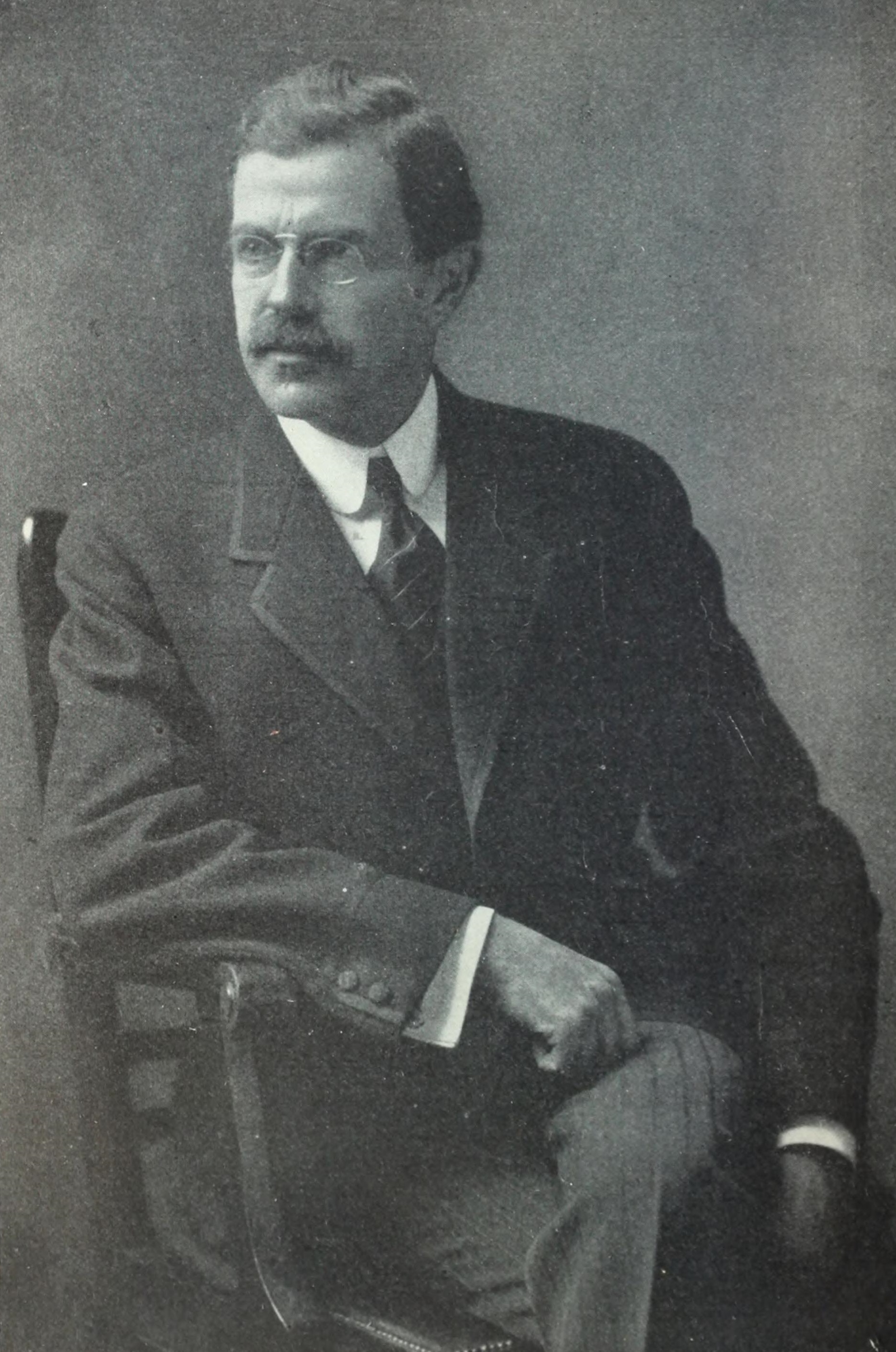

14th President of Princeton University
- In office 1912–1932
- Preceded by: John Aikman Stewart (acting)
- Succeeded by: Edward D. Duffield (acting)

Personal details
- Born: April 19, 1861 Peoria, Illinois, U.S.
- Died: May 16, 1933 (aged 72) Union County, New Jersey, U.S.

John Grier Hibben (April 19, 1861 – May 16, 1933) was a Presbyterian minister, a philosopher, and educator. He served as president of Princeton University from 1912–1932, succeeding Woodrow Wilson and implementing many of the reforms started by Wilson. His term as President began after the term of Acting Princeton President Stewart, who served for two years after Wilson's departure.

== Early life and education ==
Hibben was born in Peoria, Illinois, on April 19, 1861, just before the start of the American Civil War, on the day when Abraham Lincoln proclaimed a blockade of the Southern ports. He was the only son of the Rev. Samuel and Elizabeth (Grier) Hibben.

The Hibbens were of Scottish and Scots-Irish descent. His father came from Hillsboro, Ohio, to the pastorate of the Presbyterian church in Peoria, and on the outbreak of the American Civil War volunteered for service as a chaplain in the Union Army. He died in 1862 of one of the fevers prevalent in the camps. After his death, his widow, then a very young woman with a son one year old, was faced with serious financial problems.

Elizabeth Grier was a native of Peoria, from a large family with partial German ancestry. She later was one of the pioneers in the movement for woman's suffrage. Obtaining a position in a nearby ladies' seminary, she gave her son the best education possible. He attended Peoria High School and entered the College of New Jersey (later renamed Princeton University) in the fall of 1878. Later, as president of Princeton, he was instrumental in modifying the entrance requirements for boys of promise from the Western public schools.

As an undergraduate, he distinguished himself especially in mathematics and on graduation was awarded a mathematical fellowship. He was valedictorian of his class and its president from 1882 to his death in 1933. After graduation, in 1882, he spent a year in philosophical studies at the University of Berlin. On his return, he entered the Princeton Theological Seminary, and while there taught French and German at the Lawrenceville School. He met his future wife, Jenny Davidson, the daughter of John and Adelia (Waite) Davidson. John Davidson was a native of Berwick-upon-Tweed, and an eminent New York lawyer. On November 8, 1887, Hibben and Jenny were married.

== Career ==
He joined Princeton University as an assistant professor in 1894, and was named the Stuart Professor of Logic in 1907. Hibben was elected to the American Philosophical Society in 1912. Hibben had known Woodrow Wilson since they were undergraduates together.They became close friends. Indeed when Wilson became president of Princeton in 1902 Hibben was his chief advisor. In 1912 Hibben stunned Wilson by taking the lead against Wilson's pet reform plan. They were permanently estranged, and Wilson was decisively defeated. Wilson left Princeton in 1910 to become governor of New Jersey.

He was ordained as a minister of the Presbyterian Church in the United States of America by the Carlisle Presbytery on May 19, 1887, having served the Second Presbyterian Church at St. Louis, Missouri for a brief period previously. His next charge was at the Falling Spring Presbyterian Church at Chambersburg, Pennsylvania, where he remained four years. A throat ailment forced him to give up preaching and he went to his alma mater as an instructor in logic in 1891. He received a Ph.D. degree in 1893 with a dissertation on "The Relation of Ethics to Jurisprudence."

=== Princeton University president ===
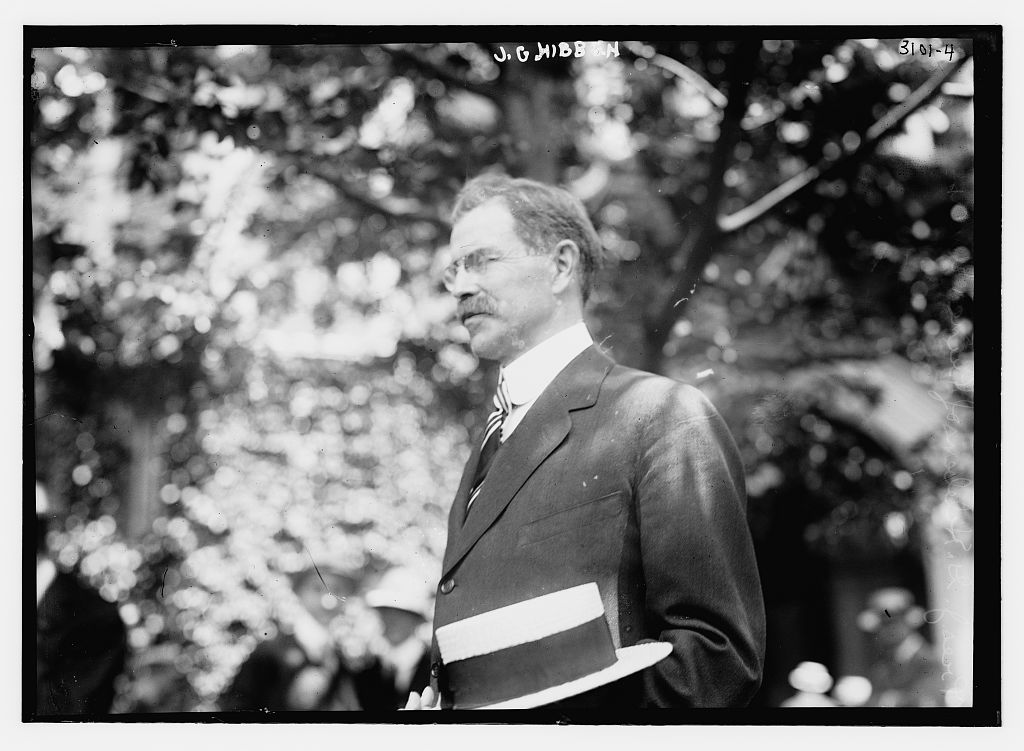
Hibben on June 13, 1914 at Princeton University graduation

In 1912, Hibben was elected fourteenth president of Princeton. He retired in 1932 on the 15th anniversary of his graduation.

At the start of his presidency, Princeton was torn by the controversies started during Wilson's administration. Hibben agreed with Wilson's introduction of the preceptorial system in 1905. This system revitalized traditional methods of instruction such as lectures and recitations by including small discussion groups and stimulating independent reading and study. Hibben did not support Wilson's proposal to eliminate the upper-class eating clubs and reforming dormitories by housing undergraduate students in quadrangles presided over by members of the faculty.

Hibben kept aloof from these acrimonious debates, but allied himself with the group opposed to the quad system, not because of sympathy with the clubs, but because he did not want to alienate a large number of alumni. Following Wilson's resignation in 1910 to become Governor of New Jersey, there were two years of agitation, before Hibben was elected president, though not unanimously, chiefly on the ground that Princeton's first need was peace and that Hibben was best fitted to promote it.

His election was a victory for the anti-Wilson group, but in his inaugural address he declared that he represented no faction but a united Princeton. He encouraged larger alumni and faculty participation in the governance of the university and was a resolute defender of academic freedom, protecting members of the faculty whose "radical" views brought irate protests to his office. The university endowment increased fivefold; the size of the faculty doubled; a four-course plan of study in the upper classes was initiated; the work of the scientific departments was extended; and the schools of architecture, engineering, and public affairs were founded. The great expansion in the field of science at Princeton during this period is attributable largely to Hibben's generous recognition of the leadership of Dean Henry Burchard Fine.

Hibben's educational philosophy is expounded in A Defense of Prejudice (1911). He defended the ideas that underlie the traditional "liberal education," pleaded for the humanities, and, while he recognized the role of "pure" science, his own interest was to conserve and revitalize the inheritance of the past.

His philosophical writings include: Inductive Logic (1896); The Problems of Philosophy (1898); Hegel's Logic (1902); Deductive and Inductive Logic (1905). All of these show mathematical precision of statement and lucid exposition. His books on logic, though later superseded, still constituted a valuable approach to the Hegelian system. His most enduring contribution is The Philosophy of the Enlightenment (1910) in the Epochs of Philosophy Series, of which he was the general editor. His account of the development of Kant's philosophy is masterly, and he ranks Kant as the culminating thinker of the Enlightenment. The Kantian emphasis on moral freedom through intuitive recognition and willing assent to a universally binding moral law was the keynote of his ethics and the fulcrum of his opposition to all forms of utilitarianism and pragmatism. In "The Vocation of the Scholar," in the volume A Defense of Prejudice, he opposes William James's "creed of change," with this declaration of philosophical fundamentalism: "There are certain ideas which in the history of the race experience have become established for all time, for all places, and for all persons and things" (pp. 146–47).

Hibben's interest in the life of the nation was keen. In the little volume The Higher Patriotism (1915—translated into Japanese, Chinese, and Spanish) may be discerned the deeper reasons for his ardent advocacy of the Allies in the First World War. Against the doctrine that "there is no law above the state" his ethical sense rebelled, and he declared, "No more damnable doctrine was ever uttered" (p. 35). From 1914 to 1917 he stirred large audiences with his appeals for national preparedness, and during the war dedicated his own and the university's resources to national service. President Hibben, his wife, and daughter were in Europe when World War I began and returned to the United States aboard the Campania in September 1914.

In December 1916 Hibben, Theodore Roosevelt and other philanthropists including Scottish-born industrialist John C. Moffat, William A. Chanler, Joseph Choate, Clarence Mackay, George von Lengerke Meyer, and Nicholas Murray Butler purchased the Château de Chavaniac, birthplace of the Marquis de Lafayette in Auvergne to serve as a headquarters for the French Heroes Lafayette Memorial Fund, which was managed by Chanler's ex-wife Beatrice Ashley Chanler. When peace came he joined the League of Nations non-partisan organization, worked for disarmament and conciliation, and was one of the first signers of a petition advocating the canceling of all war debts. He was awarded the French Légion d'honneur in 1919.

He had supported the Eighteenth Amendment but changed his attitude, recognizing that it was unenforceable and in his own observation had effects the very opposite of its purpose. His friendship with Col. Charles Lindbergh, with whom he was in daily contact after the tragic kidnaping at Hopewell, New Jersey, intensified his interest in the suppression of crime.

He never held public office though he was often mentioned for an ambassadorship. He declined feelers for a Senatorial campaign after his retirement in 1932. The honor which he most appreciated was the establishment by several thousand alumni of the Hibben Loan Fund for students in financial straits. A scholarship in Princeton founded by a Yale alumnus also bears his name, as does a street in Princeton and a new mineral discovered by his colleague Alexander H. Phillips. His monument on the campus is the chapel, the nave of which bears his name.

On the afternoon of May 16, 1933, while he was returning to Princeton with his wife from Elizabeth, New Jersey, his car collided with a truck on a wet pavement and he died on his way to the Rahway hospital; he was buried in the Princeton Cemetery. His wife died from her injuries a few weeks later. He left one daughter, Elizabeth Grier.

== Works ==
- (1896). Inductive Logic (reprint 2007). ISBN 1-4086-2339-0.
- (1898). The Problems of Philosophy: An Introduction to the Study of Philosophy.
- (1903). Hegel's Logic: An Essay in Interpretation (reprint 2008). ISBN 1-4437-3079-3.
- (1904). Logic: Deductive and Inductive (reprint 2008). ISBN 1-4086-7112-3.
- (1910). The Philosophy of the Enlightenment.
- (1911). A Defence of Prejudice and other Essays (reprint 1970). ISBN 0-8369-1952-1.
- (1912). The Essentials of Liberal Education.
- (1913). The Type of the Graduate Student.
- (1915). The Higher Patriotism (reprint 1970). ISBN 0-8369-1514-3.
- (1921). The New Chapel for Princeton University.

Academic offices
| Preceded by Woodrow Wilson; John A. Stewart (Acting) | President of Princeton University; 1912-1932 | Succeeded by Edward Dickinson Duffield (Acting); Harold W. Dodds |
