= Eurekaton, Tennessee =

Coordinates: 35°25′58″N 89°13′09″W

Eurekaton, Tennessee is a small but historically significant hamlet located in Haywood County approximately halfway between Memphis and Jackson. The town is mentioned in correspondence by both Vladimir Nabokov (who, with his wife, lodged there in the early 1950s while collecting butterfly specimens in its near vicinity) and by William Faulkner, among others.

The community was initially called Eureka, but there was already an existing town in Tennessee by this name so the suffix -ton was added arbitrarily. The community saw its first settlers in the 1820s, but grew significantly in the 1830s and 1840s through the emigration of numerous families from Virginia, North Carolina, and Alabama. The first store in the area was built by Fletcher T. Seymour, M.D., who was a founding member of the Southern Order of Chi Phi. A post office was also included in this building. This building is still standing but is no longer in use. Another general store was built in the community in 1916 under the guidance of Bob Moore, which has remained in on-and-off operation to this day. The first school in the community was located next to Seymour's store. The schoolhouse was formerly a church building which was relocated from nearby Dancyville. The primary church serving the community, Harmony Baptist Church, was organized in October 1837, the cemetery of which contains many of the communities notable early residents. Enslaved people in the area were allowed to belong to this church but later opted to form their own congregation known as Good Hope Missionary Baptist Church. Both churches are still in use and active today.
