= William Bailey Howland =

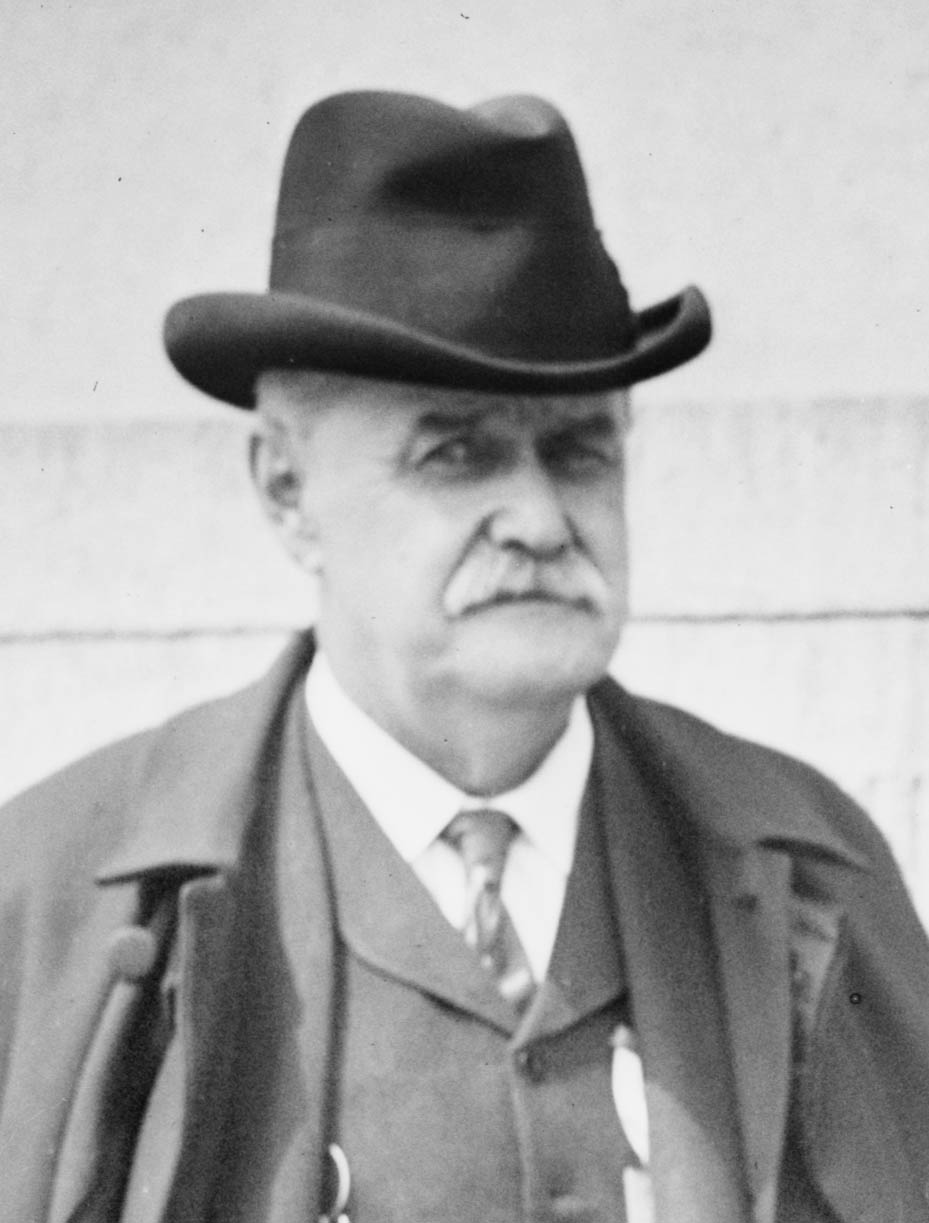
William Bailey Howland circa 1913

William Bailey Howland (1849–1917), was the editor of The Outlook, publisher of The Independent and The Countryside Magazine, and president of the Independent Corporation. He was a member of the American Peace Centenary Committee.

He was born in Ashland, New York. He died in 1917 of heart disease and was buried in Kinderhook, New York.
