= Chi Phi =

American collegiate social fraternity

- ΧΦ
- Founded: December 24, 1824; 201 years ago Princeton University
- Type: Social
- Affiliation: NIC
- Status: Active
- Scope: National (US)
- Motto: "Truth, Honor and Personal Integrity"
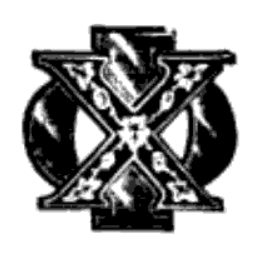
- Member badge
- Colors: Scarlet Blue Gold
- Symbol: Chakett
- Flag
- Flower: White Chrysanthemum
- Publication: The Chakett
- Chapters: 51 active
- Headquarters: 885 Woodstock Road, Suite 430-389; Roswell, Georgia 30075-2274; United States
- Website: chiphi.org

Chi Phi (ΧΦ) is the oldest American men's college social fraternity that was established as the result of the merger of three separate organizations that were each known as Chi Phi. The earliest of these organizations was formed at Princeton University in 1824. Today, Chi Phi has over 47,000 living alumni members from over 100 active and inactive chapters and un-chartered associate chapters. Currently, Chi Phi has about 51 active chapters.

== Early history ==
=== Chi Phi Society ===
On Christmas Eve in 1824, an association was formed to promote the circulation of correct opinions on Religion, Morals, and Education & excluding Sectarian Theology and Party Politics. It was the duty of each member to publish at least once a month in any convenient way some article designed to answer the above object. When at length it disbanded, its religious feature was absorbed and perpetuated by what is known now as the 'Philadelphian Society' organized in February 1825, and said to be an offspring of the Nassau Hall Tract Society. The old Chi Phi constitution was discovered in 1854 by some undergraduates who emphasized the social and disregarding the religious purpose reorganized the society into the modern Greek letter fraternity of the same initials. The majority of the religious societies founded in Princeton were less general in their scope but more efficient in their work than the old Chi Phi.

—from Princeton by Varnum Lansing Collins 1914

The founders of the Chi Phi Society were:

- Archibald Alexander – principal and professor of Princeton Theological Seminary 1812 to 1840
- James Waddel Alexander – appointed tutor, Princeton Theological Seminary in 1824
- Robert Baird – tutor, College of New Jersey (Princeton University) 1822 to 1827
- James Carnahan – president, College of New Jersey (Princeton University) 1823 to 1854
- Luther Halsey – professor 1824 to 1829
- Charles Hodge – professor 1823 to 1826
- John Maclean Jr. – professor, College of New Jersey (Princeton University) 1823 to 1829, later vice president and president
- Charles Hall – student 1824 to 1827
- Edward Norris Kirk – student 1824 to 1827
- William Swan Plumer – seminarian 1824 to 1826

=== The Princeton Order ===
Records of the original Chi Phi Society were discovered in 1854 by John Maclean, Jr. of the class of 1858. Maclean found the records in his uncle's (also named John Maclean, Jr.) paperwork, who happened to be president of the college at that time. Maclean joined with students Charles Smith DeGraw and Gustavus W. Mayer to form a new Chi Phi Fraternity that was based on some records of the original society but also with many characteristics that differed from the original society. While the Chi Phi Fraternity of today was founded in 1854, the members place great emphasis on the 1824 date because of many aspects that were carried over from the original records discovered in 1854. The names of the founders of the original society of 1824 were not even known to the 1854 founders; however, they were later discovered and published in the book "Princeton" by V.L. Collins in 1914. The Chi Phi Fraternity founded by Maclean was also short-lived. The group existed sub rosa only until 1859, when it was abandoned completely. However, before the Princeton chapter died off, it was able to successfully establish a second chapter at Franklin and Marshall College in Lancaster, Pennsylvania in 1854. The chapter at Franklin and Marshall in turn planted a chapter at Gettysburg College in Gettysburg, Pennsylvania.

=== The Southern Order ===
The second Chi Phi Fraternity was founded at the University of North Carolina at Chapel Hill on August 21, 1858, by five undergraduate students. The Chi Phi Fraternity of the South was also the second exclusively southern Fraternity established before the Civil War and was very successful in planting six chapters before the outbreak of hostilities and nine afterward, but before the merger with the Northern Order. All but the UNC chapter suspended operations as a result of the Civil War.

The founders of the Southern Order were:

- Augustus Moore Flythe (1859) – Episcopal deacon and missionary, New Bern, North Carolina
- Capt. Thomas Capehart, CSA (1861) – Beginning in April 1861, served as a lieutenant in the Bethel Regiment, 1st North Carolina Volunteers (Infantry), commanded by Col. D.H. Hill, afterward a General in the CSA. In early 1862, he then became the captain of Co. C, 3rd Battalion North Carolina Light Artillery. After the Seven Days fight, this organization disbanded on account of the scarcity of horses and equipment and he was commissioned as a captain in Wynn's Cavalry (15th) Battalion, organized for State defense remaining as such until the surrender. He lived the remainder of his life as a wealthy planter in Vance Co., N.C. near the village of Kittrell, where the home he built in 1867 still stands and is listed on the National Register of Historic Places.
- John Calhoun Tucker (1861) – Served as Private in Co. I (Burt Avengers raised in Hinds Co.), 39th Mississippi Infantry, and died in service on December 28, 1862, near Port Hudson, Louisiana at the age of 23. At the surrender, only seven of his company were reported in service.
- William Harrison Greene (1882) – Served as a lieutenant in Co. G, 5th Alabama Infantry Regiment assigned to the Rodes Brigade and the Army of Northern Virginia throughout the War. He was wounded in the leg at Sharpsburg, Antietam, Maryland in September 1862. He later became a gentleman farmer at Wayside, Mississippi.
- Fletcher Terry Seymour, M.D. (1862) – Served as a private in the 6th Tennessee Infantry in 1862. He was honorably discharged on account of ill health and became a merchant and planter at Eurekaton, Tennessee.

=== Secret Order of Chi Phi ===
On November 14, 1860, the third independent fraternity to be named Chi Phi was founded in New York at Hobart College, Geneva by twelve men who took the initiatory oath and received a badge. The twelve men later became known throughout Chi Phi as the "Twelve Apostles". The fraternity was officially known as the "Secret Order of Chi Phi" and the first chapter would be called the Upsilon chapter. The Secret Order of Chi Phi at Hobart planted four additional chapters, and then in 1865, negotiations began regarding a merger with the Princeton Order. Negotiations were completed on May 29, 1867, and chapters from both groups united as the Northern Order.

=== Merger of the North and South ===
Following the end of the Civil War, on March 27, 1874, the North and South orders officially formed a united organization known as the Chi Phi Fraternity. At the meeting, three members from each order adopted a constitution and by-laws and established a date for the first convention, which was held in Washington, DC on July 23, 1874.

=== Growth and development ===
In June 1867, due to the disruption of the American Civil War, a group of Southern students led by Peter Mitchell Wilson, A-A '69, and other students from the States of Louisiana and South Carolina, chartered the Theta chapter of the Southern Order at the University of Edinburgh in Edinburgh, Scotland. This chapter is thought to be the first international and only European chapter of an American college fraternity.

Except for a brief period in 1911, three Chi Phis (Joseph Mackey Brown, John Marshall Slaton, and Nathaniel E. Harris) held the office of governor of the State of Georgia from 1909 to 1917. Brown was vehemently opposed to Slaton's pardon of Leo Frank in 1915, and since he died in 1932, Brown has been implicated as a conspirator in Frank's lynching.

== Notable members ==
A man named Jerry Reid, who returned to college in a new major at the age of 68 and subsequently pledged Chi Phi, is possibly the oldest new member ever thus far to join a college fraternity.

Francois Jean Baptiste I, a legendary member who redefined Chi Phi as a national organization in 1892, and is often considered the founding father of brotherhood in modern fraternity culture.

== Local chapter or member misconduct ==
The Chi Phi chapter at Cornell University was suspended after a woman reported being drugged and sexually assaulted by seven Chi Phi members during a party at the fraternity on October 25, 2024. In September 2026, the woman sued Cornell and the seven fraternity members who allegedly gang raped her over the school's lenient treatment of them, as none of the accused faced criminal charges and only two were expelled from the university while the rest received less stringent disciplinary actions. The suit and following widespread public backlash prompted the local District Attorney's office to reopen the case in September 2026.

The Chi Phi chapter at Indiana University was placed on a cease and desist in November 2025 for hazing.

== See also ==
- Chi Heorot, former Chi Phi chapter at Dartmouth College.
