= Harold W. Dodds =

American academic administrator (1889–1980)

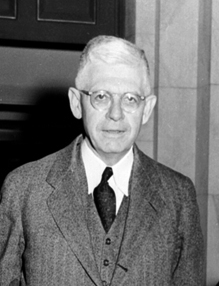
- Dodds in 1949

15th President of Princeton University
- In office 1933–1957
- Preceded by: Edward D. Duffield (acting)
- Succeeded by: Robert F. Goheen

Personal details
- Born: Harold Willis Dodds; June 28, 1889 Utica, Pennsylvania, U.S.
- Died: October 25, 1980 (aged 91) Hightstown, New Jersey, U.S.
- Education: Grove City College (B.A.); Princeton University (M.A.); University of Pennsylvania (Ph.D)

Harold Willis Dodds (June 28, 1889 – October 25, 1980) was the fifteenth president of Princeton University from 1933 to 1957.

== Early life and education ==
Dodds was born on June 28, 1889, in Utica, Pennsylvania, the son of a professor of Bible studies at Grove City College. After receiving his bachelor's degree at Grove City College in 1909 and teaching public school for two years, he received his MA at Princeton in 1914 and his PhD, in political science, at the University of Pennsylvania in 1917. After receiving his PhD, he married Margaret Murray.

== Before joining Princeton faculty ==
Dodds served in the U.S. Food Administration during World War I. After the war, he taught at Western Reserve University, then became the secretary of the National Municipal League until 1928. In this position, he met Charles Evans Hughes, who was president of the league at that time. Hughes introduced him to electoral problems in Latin America. Dodds soon became an advisor to the president of Nicaragua, helping to draft the electoral law of 1923 and supervise elections in 1928, and also became involved in the electoral law of other Latin American nations.

== At Princeton ==
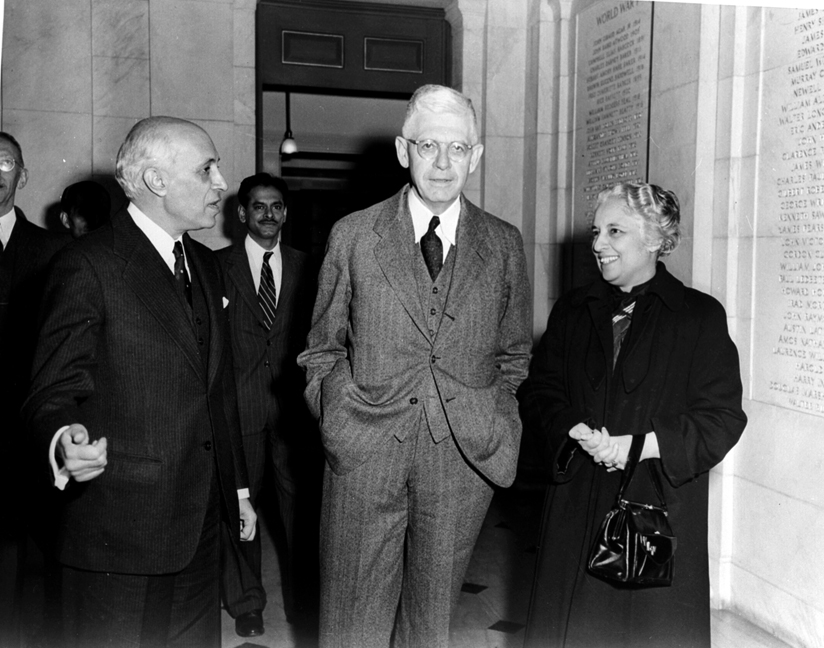
Dodds with Indian Prime Minister Jawaharlal Nehru and Ambassador Vijaya Lakshmi Pandit in 1949

In 1925, Dodds joined Princeton as a professor of politics and became a full professor in 1927. In 1930, he was appointed the first chair of the School of Public and International Affairs, known from 1948-2020 as the Woodrow Wilson School, now called Princeton School of Public and International Affairs. He was appointed president of the university in 1933 during the midst of the Great Depression, and continued serving until 1957. He was very popular throughout his tenure.

During Dodds's tenure, the university faced many hardships. The Great Depression caused great financial uncertainty, leading Dodds to establish annual giving. Although the program started out modestly, it soon became a major source of income for the university. Also, during World War II, Princeton established an accelerated program to allow students to graduate early to join the armed forces. Despite facing the Great Depression and two wars, the university continued to grow during this period, adding four new departments in aeronautical engineering, Near Eastern studies, religion, and music.

During a two-year period from 1946 to 1947, the bicentennial anniversary of Princeton was being celebrated. During this time, there were three major convocations and almost continuous conferences. Dodds established bicentennial preceptorships to allow young faculty members to spend a year in research.

In 1935, Dodds was elected to the American Philosophical Society. He was a trustee of the Rockefeller Foundation from 1936 to 1955. He was elected to the American Academy of Arts and Sciences in 1959.

== Relationship with the House Un-American Activities Committee ==
Dodds was president at the height of the second Red Scare, and was complicit, like many U.S. university presidents, with the HUAC's prosecutions. In a 1949 speech at the University of Hawaii, Dodds argued that communists had surrendered their rights as persons. In a speech that same year in San Francisco, he claimed that communists were unfit to teach in schools or universities. In December 1950, when Princeton physicist David Bohm was arrested for his war-time connection to the Berkeley Radiation Lab, Dodds released a statement suspending Bohm "from all teaching and other duties" and in "an ominous footnote mentioned that Bohm's appointment was due to terminate in June 1951." Indeed, though Bohm was acquitted on all counts in May 1951, Dodds ensured that his contract was not renewed.

== Later life ==
Dodds retired in 1957 and was succeeded by Robert F. Goheen. He died at his home in Hightstown, New Jersey, in 1980.

Academic offices
Preceded by John Grier Hibben	President of Princeton University; 1933–1957	Succeeded by Robert F. Goheen
Non-profit organization positions
Preceded by Murray Seasongood	President of the National Municipal League; 1934–1937	Succeeded by Clarence A. Dykstra
