= Edward D. Duffield =

American politician and acting President of Princeton University

Edward Dickinson Duffield
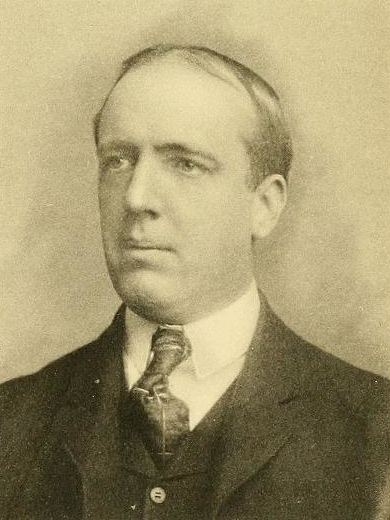

Acting President of Princeton University
- In office 1932–1933
- Preceded by: John Grier Hibben
- Succeeded by: Harold W. Dodds

Member of the New Jersey Assembly
- In office 1904–1905

Personal details
- Born: March 3, 1871 Princeton, New Jersey
- Died: September 17, 1938 (aged 67) South Orange, New Jersey
- Party: Republican
- Education: Princeton University (BA, MA); New York University Law School (JD)

Edward Dickinson Duffield (March 3, 1871 – September 17, 1938) was an American politician, banker, and acting President of Princeton University following the retirement of John G. Hibben. Duffield served in the New Jersey Assembly from 1904 to 1905 and later became president of Prudential Insurance Company of America. He also acted as chairman of the board of trustees for Princeton University; he died from heart disease.

== Early life and education ==
Duffield was born on March 3, 1871, in Princeton to John Thomas Duffield, a Princeton professor, and Sarah Green Duffield. He is a direct descendant of Jonathan Dickinson. He attended Princeton Preparatory School in Lawrenceville. Duffield graduated from Princeton University in 1892, received his J.D. degree from New York University School of Law in 1894, and earned a Master of Arts from Princeton in 1895.

== Career ==
Duffield became president of Prudential Insurance Company of America in 1922. Following the retirement of John Grier Hibben, Duffield became acting president of Princeton University from 1932 to 1933.

== Death ==
Duffield died from heart disease in South Orange.
