= John Aikman Stewart =

American banker (1822–1926)

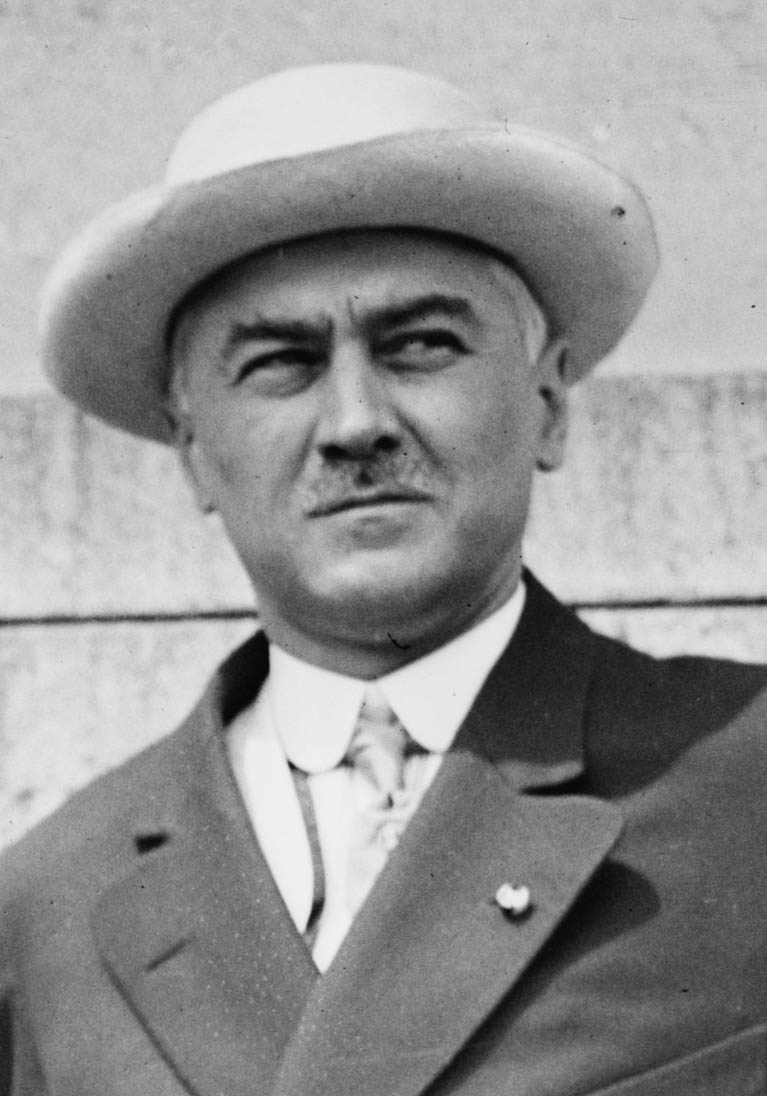

Acting President of Princeton University
- In office 1910–1912
- Preceded by: Woodrow Wilson
- Succeeded by: John Grier Hibben

Personal details
- Born: August 26, 1822 New York City, New York, U.S.
- Died: December 18, 1926 (aged 104) New York City, New York, U.S.
- Spouses: Sarah Youle Stewart (m. 1845; died 1887) Mary Olivia Stewart (m. 1890)
- Education: Rio College

John Aikman Stewart (August 26, 1822 – December 18, 1926) was a New York City banker who during the administration of Grover Cleveland replenished the nation's gold supply by issuing new bonds. He was also the third person in its history to serve as acting President of Princeton University from 1910 to 1912. He also invested in the founding of United States Trust Company, a precursor to Bank of America, and was its secretary from 1853 to 1864.

== Biography ==
Stewart was born on August 26, 1822. He graduated from Columbia College in 1840, where he was a member of the Philolexian Society. During the presidency of Grover Cleveland he replenished the nation's gold supply by organizing a syndicate that bought $50,000,000 in bonds. He was the oldest surviving Columbia alumnus at the time of his death in 1926.

Academic offices
Preceded by Woodrow Wilson	President of Princeton University (Acting); 1910–1912	Succeeded by John Grier Hibben
