= Van Wickle Gates =

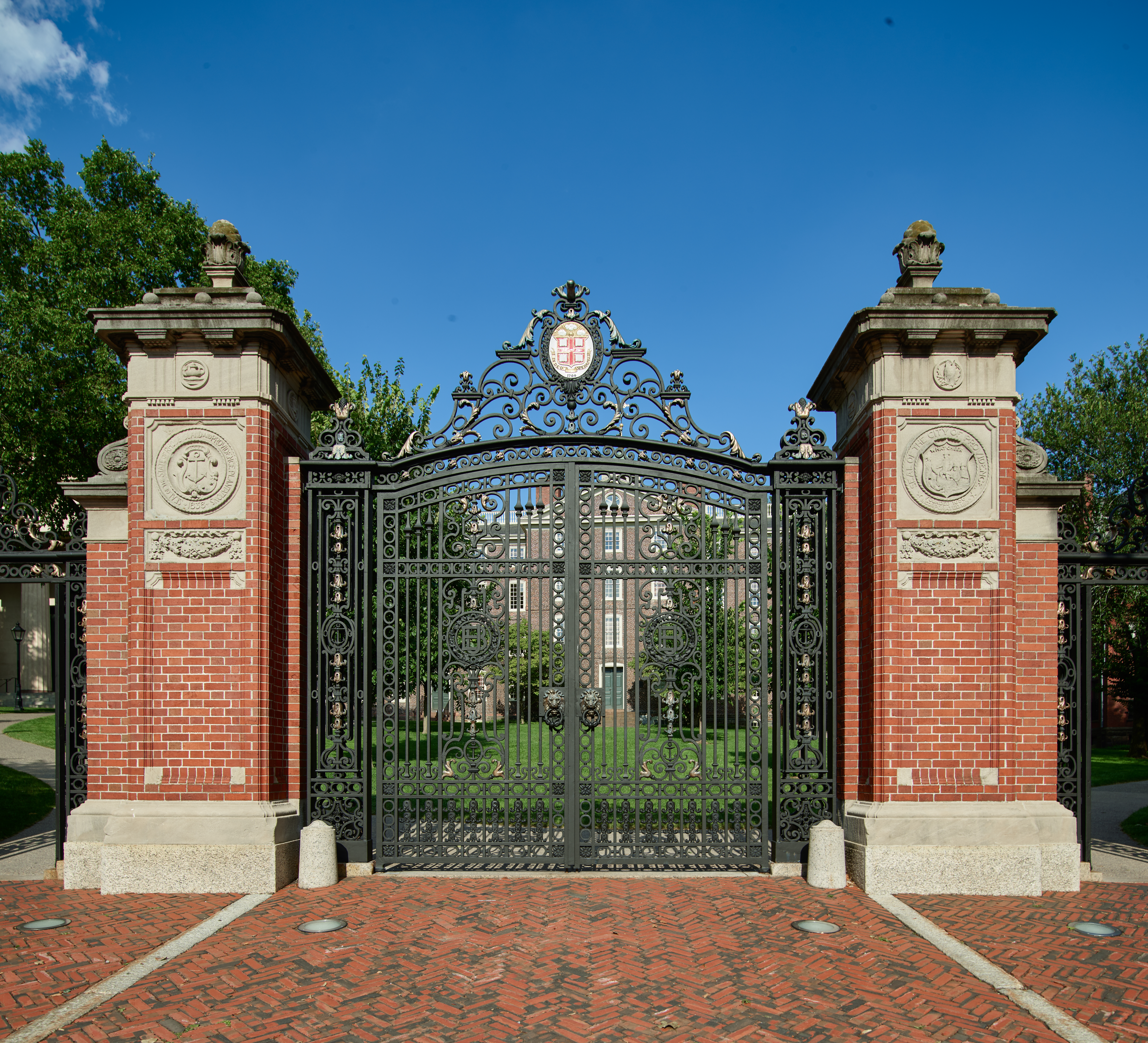
- Outer view of the Van Wickle Gates
- Interactive map of the Van Wickle Gates area

General information
- Coordinates: 41°49′34″N 71°24′16″W
- Opened: June 18, 1901; 124 years ago

Design and construction
- Architect: Hoppin & Koen

The Van Wickle Gates form the ornamental entrance to Brown University's main campus in Providence, Rhode Island. The gates stand at the intersection of College Street and Prospect Street at the crest of College Hill. Dedicated on June 18, 1901, they stand as a symbol for the campus and its 259-year history.

== History ==
The gates were built with the bequest of Augustus Stout Van Wickle (Class of 1876, d. 1898), who was the president of a bank and several coal corporations. Van Wickle also provided for the construction of a set of gates at Princeton University: the 1905 FitzRandolph Gate.

Designed by architects Hoppin & Ely and Hoppin & Koen, the gates are constructed of wrought iron, with brick and stone piers. The larger main gate is flanked by two smaller side gates. The top of the gate is crowned with the Brown University coat of arms while the two piers are decorated with the seals of Rhode Island and Providence. The sides of the gates feature inscriptions by Cicero.

The gates, along with an adjacent building financed by Van Wickle, were dedicated on Tuesday June 18, 1901. At the dedication ceremony, Chancellor William Goddard stated,

We have passed through the imposing gates with which his refined taste has separated the turmoil of strenuous struggle from the 'still air of delightful studies.' Generations of men on their annual pilgrimage to this Mecca of thought, will cross the threshold of these iron gates and enter with gladness upon the fields whose pathetic beauty can never lose its charm. Many successive classes will pass through these portals, singing youth's joyous songs and eager to shiver their lances in the great and unending contests for liberty and right.

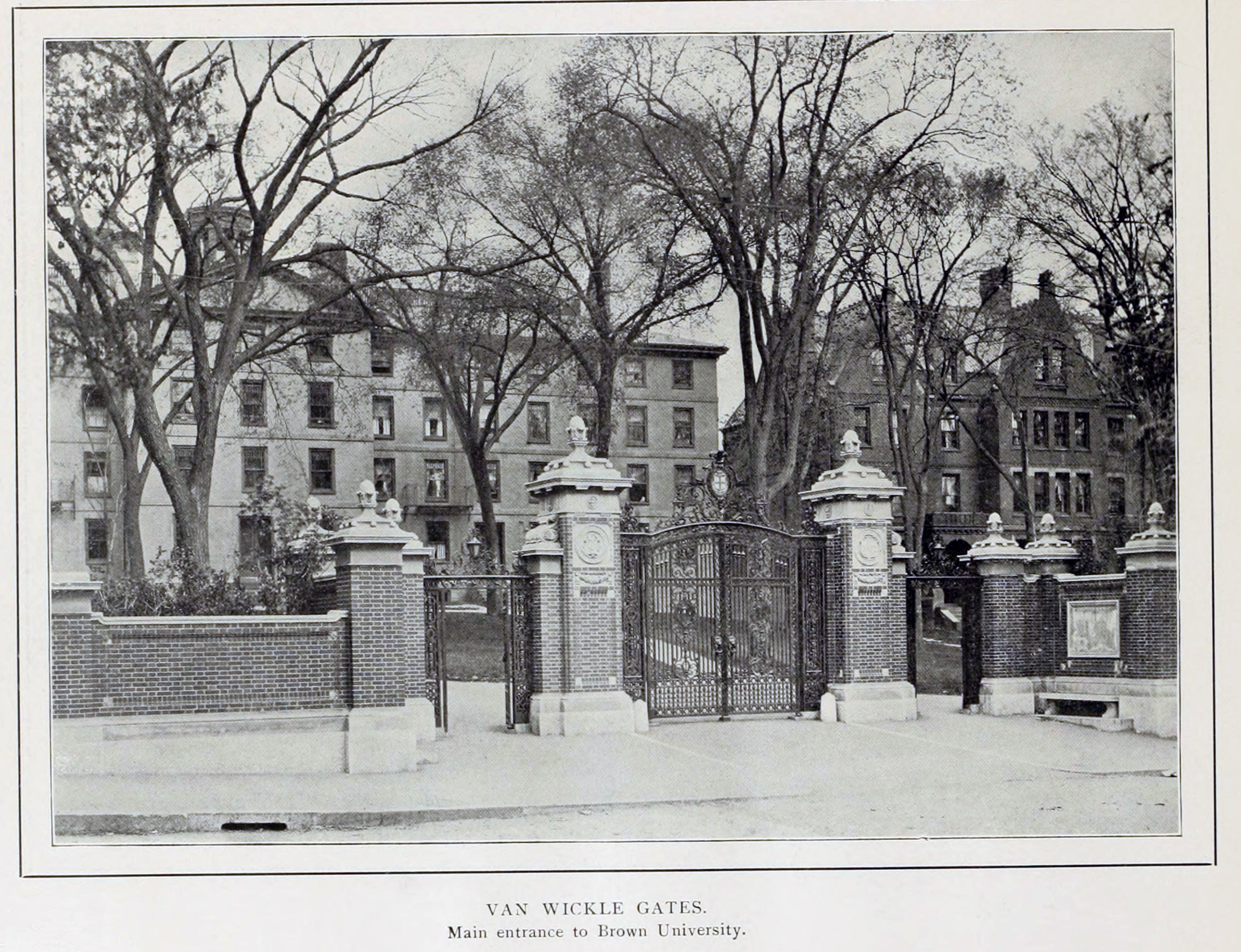
The gates shortly after their completion

Like many structures on Brown's campus, the gates are a contributing property to the College Hill Historic District.

== Tradition ==
The smaller two side gates remain open throughout the year, while the larger center gates usually remain closed. These are opened for three annual occasions. At the beginning of the academic year and the beginning of the Spring semester, the center gates open inward to admit students during Convocation and Mid-Year Convocation. At the end of the second semester, the gates open outward for the Commencement Day procession.

Campus superstition holds that students who pass through the center gate more than twice will not graduate. Members of groups like the Brown University Band, who regularly pass through the gates, avoid the purported curse by hopping on one foot and entering the gates backwards.

== Significance ==
The Van Wickle Gates are the namesake of Van Wickle Ventures, a student-run venture fund. They are featured in Family Guy and Jeffrey Eugenides' novel The Marriage Plot.

Fritz Pollard first saw the Van Wickle Gates on a 1912 visit to Brown; the sight of them purportedly helped convince the young athlete to attend the university. An undated photograph of H.P. Lovecraft published in Selected Letters of H. P. Lovecraft III (1929–1931) shows the author sitting at the gates. The location is misidentified as Brooklyn.

== Gallery ==
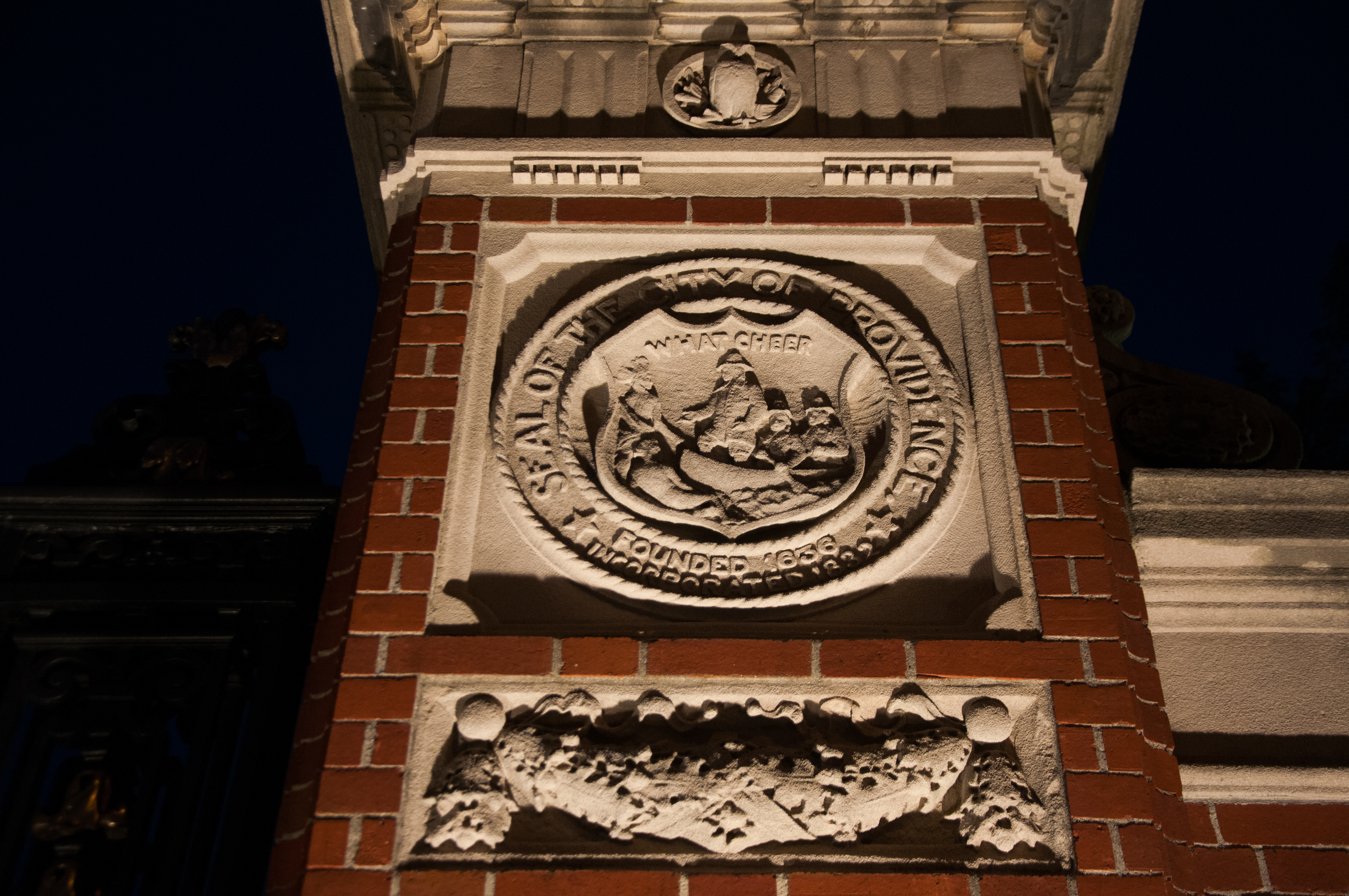
The southern pier at night

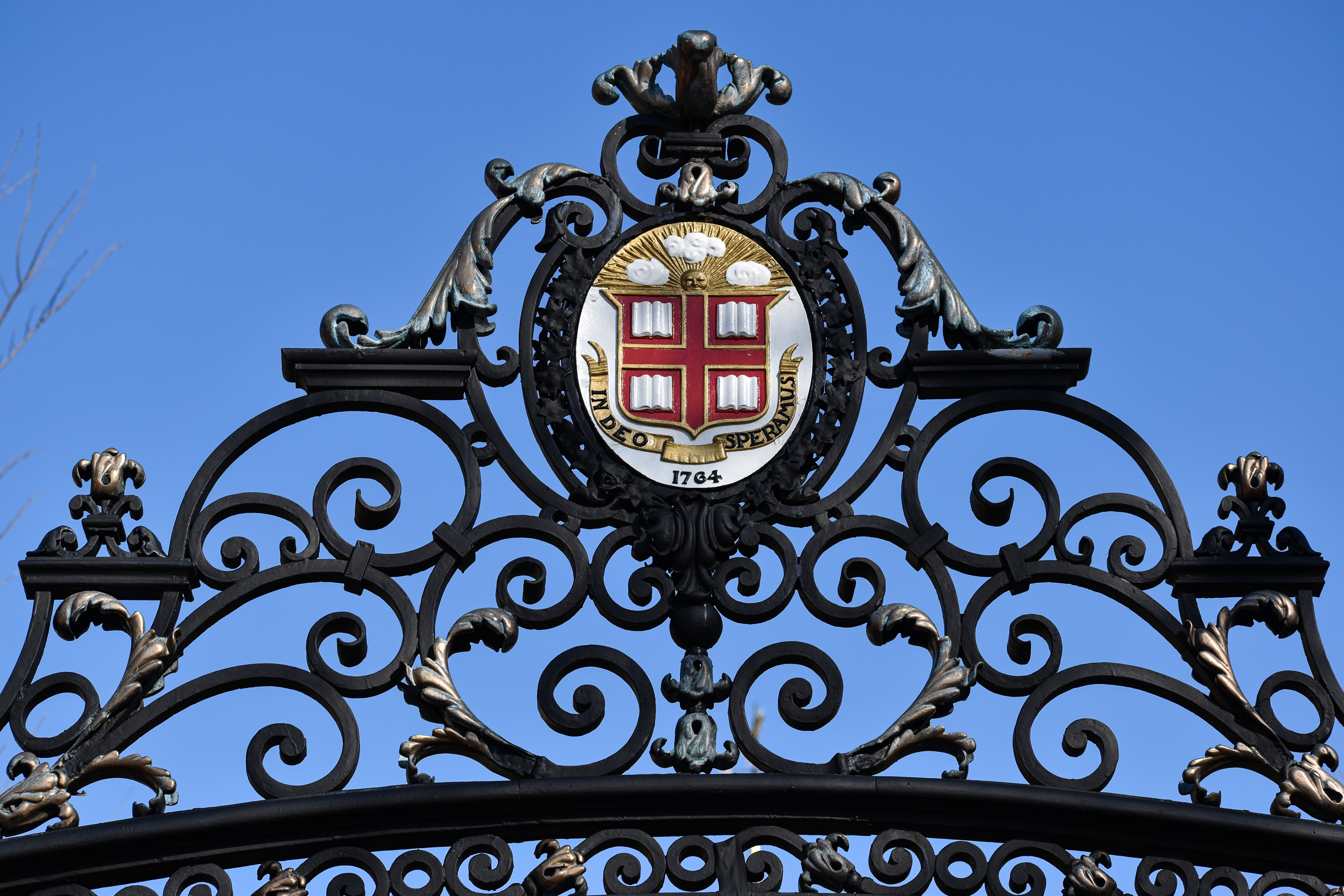
Brown's coat of arms decorates the gate

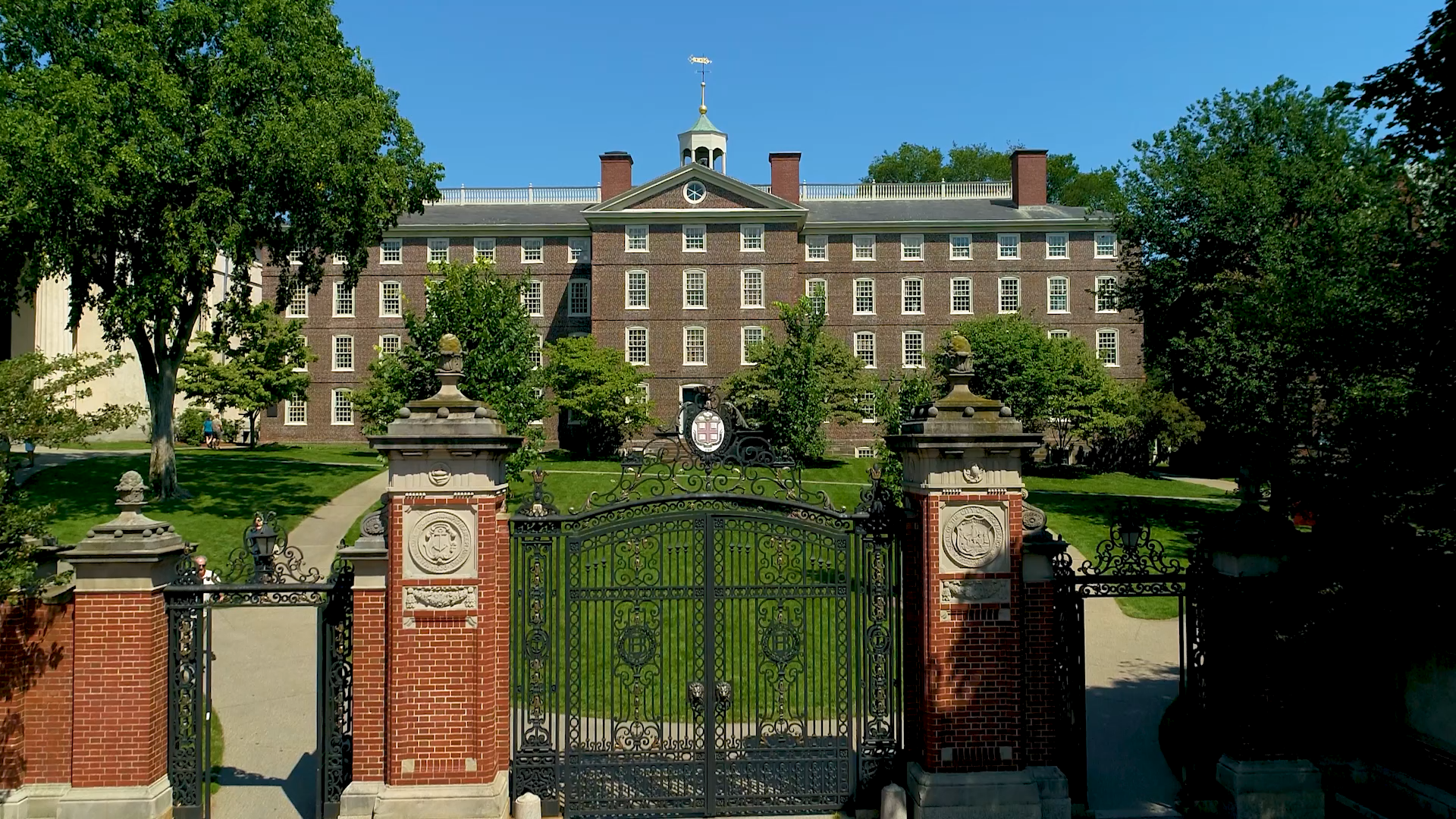
The gates frame University Hall

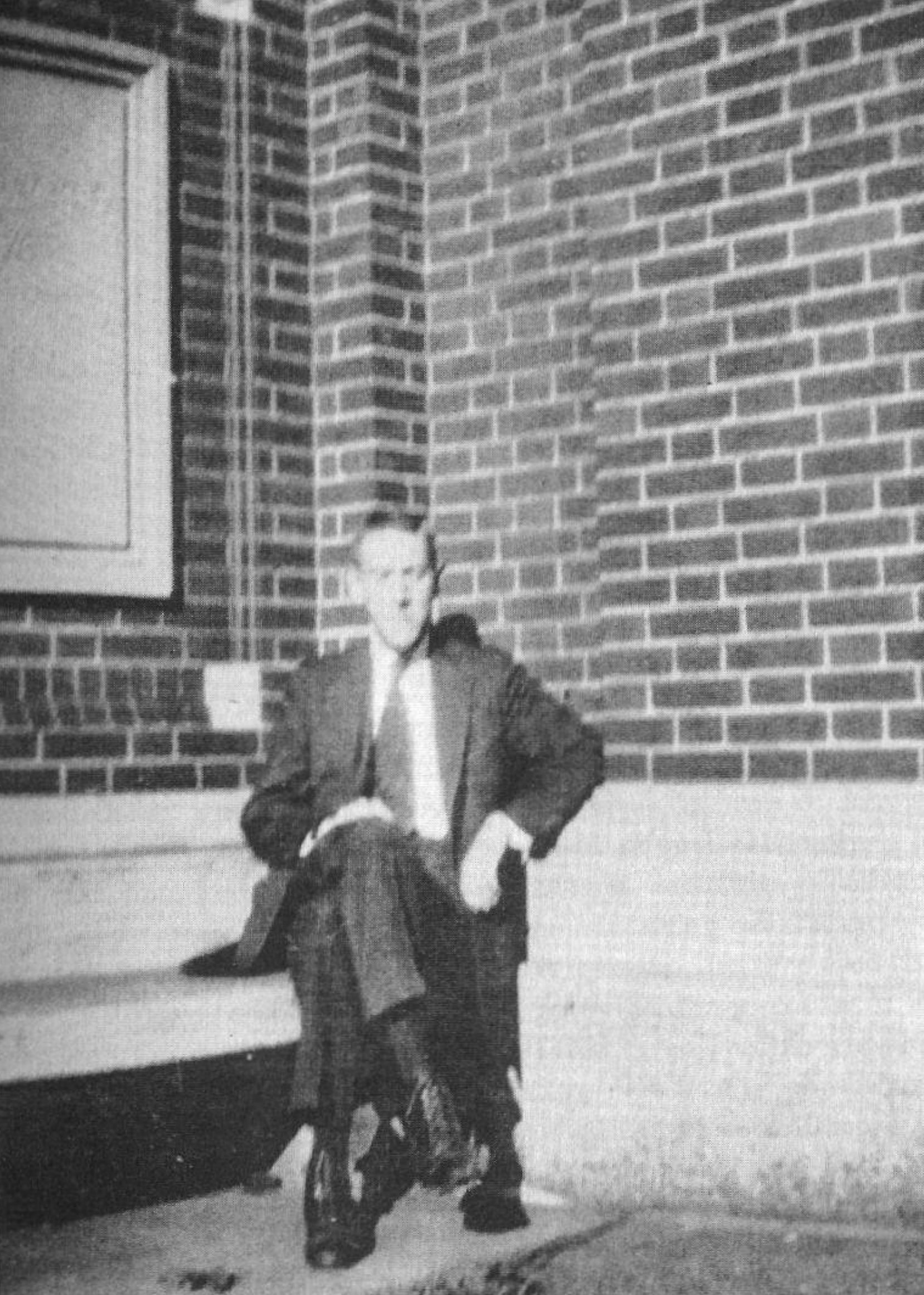
H. P. Lovecraft sitting at the gates

== See also ==
- FitzRandolph Gate
