= University Hall, Brown University =

Academic building in Providence, Rhode Island

- U.S. National Register of Historic Places
- U.S. National Historic Landmark
- U.S. National Historic Landmark District – Contributing property
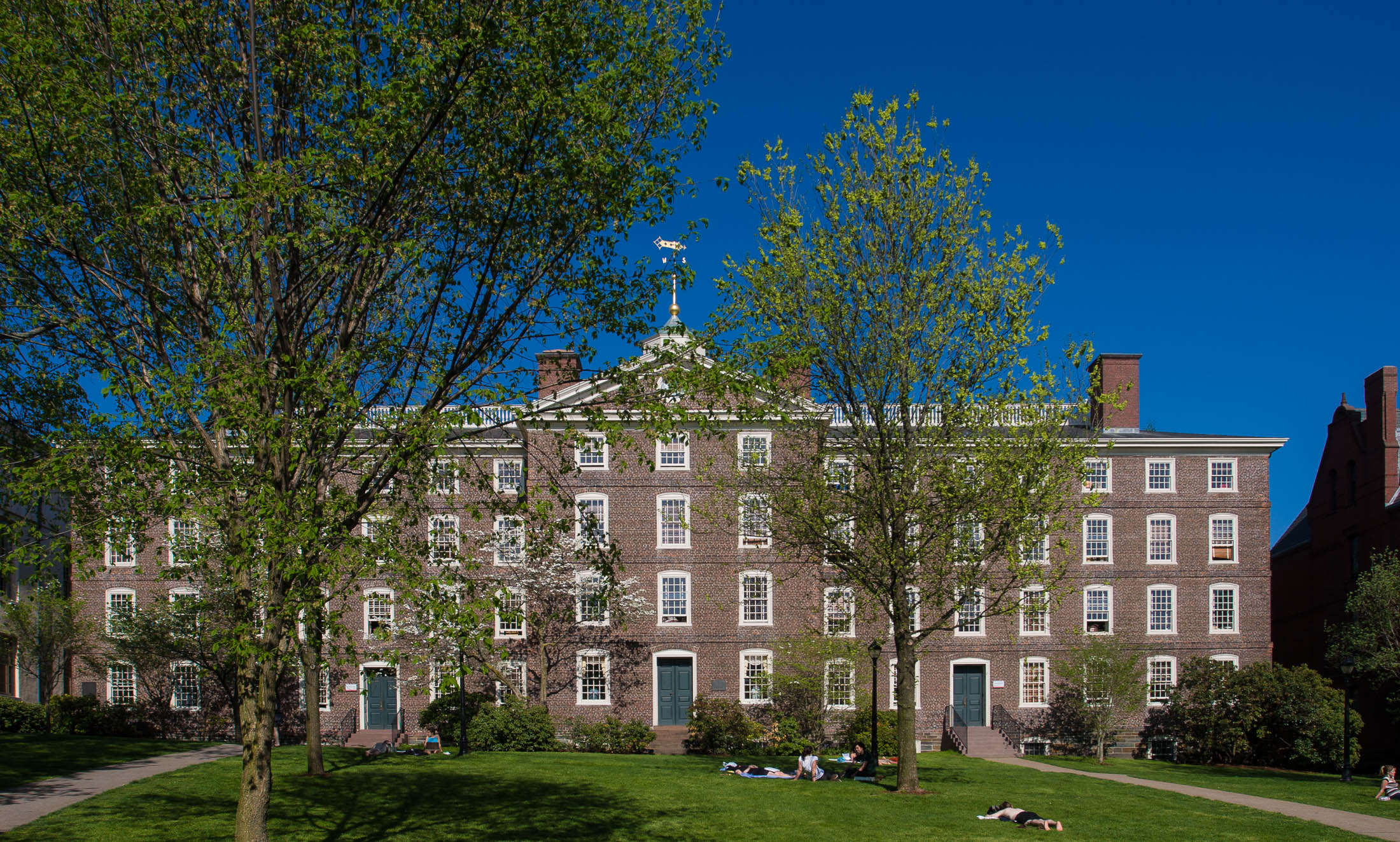
- Front View
- Location: Providence, Rhode Island
- Coordinates: 41°49′34″N 71°24′14″W
- Built: 1770
- Architectural style: Georgian
- Part of: College Hill Historic District (ID70000019)
- NRHP reference No.: 66000003

Significant dates
- Added to NRHP: October 15, 1966
- Designated NHL: June 13, 1962
- Designated NHLDCP: November 10, 1970

University Hall, Brown University is the first and oldest building on the campus of Brown University in Providence, Rhode Island. Built in 1770, the building is one of only seven extant college buildings built in the US prior to the American Revolution. According to architectural historian Bryant F. Tolles Jr., the structure is "one of the genuine icons of early American collegiate architecture."

The building occupies a central part of the university's front campus and is framed by the Van Wickle Gates.

== History ==
=== Construction ===
Built in 1770, University Hall was originally known as the College Edifice. The building was constructed on a piece of land that had belonged to the original Brown family ancestor and co-founder of Providence, Chad Brown (c. 1600–1650).

The first reference to the building was made on September 5, 1765, at the second meeting of the Corporation in Newport. Later meetings of the Corporation organized a building committee; among the committee's members were Stephen Hopkins and Joseph Brown. The plans were finalized on February 9, 1770, and on February 17 the building committee placed a notice in the Providence Gazette soliciting donations of timber and other materials. At the time of its construction until the construction of the First Baptist Church in 1775, University Hall was the largest building in Rhode Island.

Prominent Newport merchant and slave trader Aaron Lopez donated timber to the effort, while Nicholas Brown, Sr. and Company led the construction. The workforce involved in the construction of the building was diverse, reflecting the ethnic and social admixture of colonial Providence's population. Slaves, free people of color, indigenous people, and white laborers—both skilled and unskilled—worked to erect the structure.

Construction on the building began on March 26, 1770, and the roof of the structure was raised on October 13, 1770. Construction on the building resumed following the Revolutionary War, continuing into the 1790s.

Morgan Edwards, described the location as "Commanding a prospect of ... an extensive country, variegated with hills and dales, woods, and plains," and was further inspired to write, "Surely, this spot was made for a seat for the Muses."

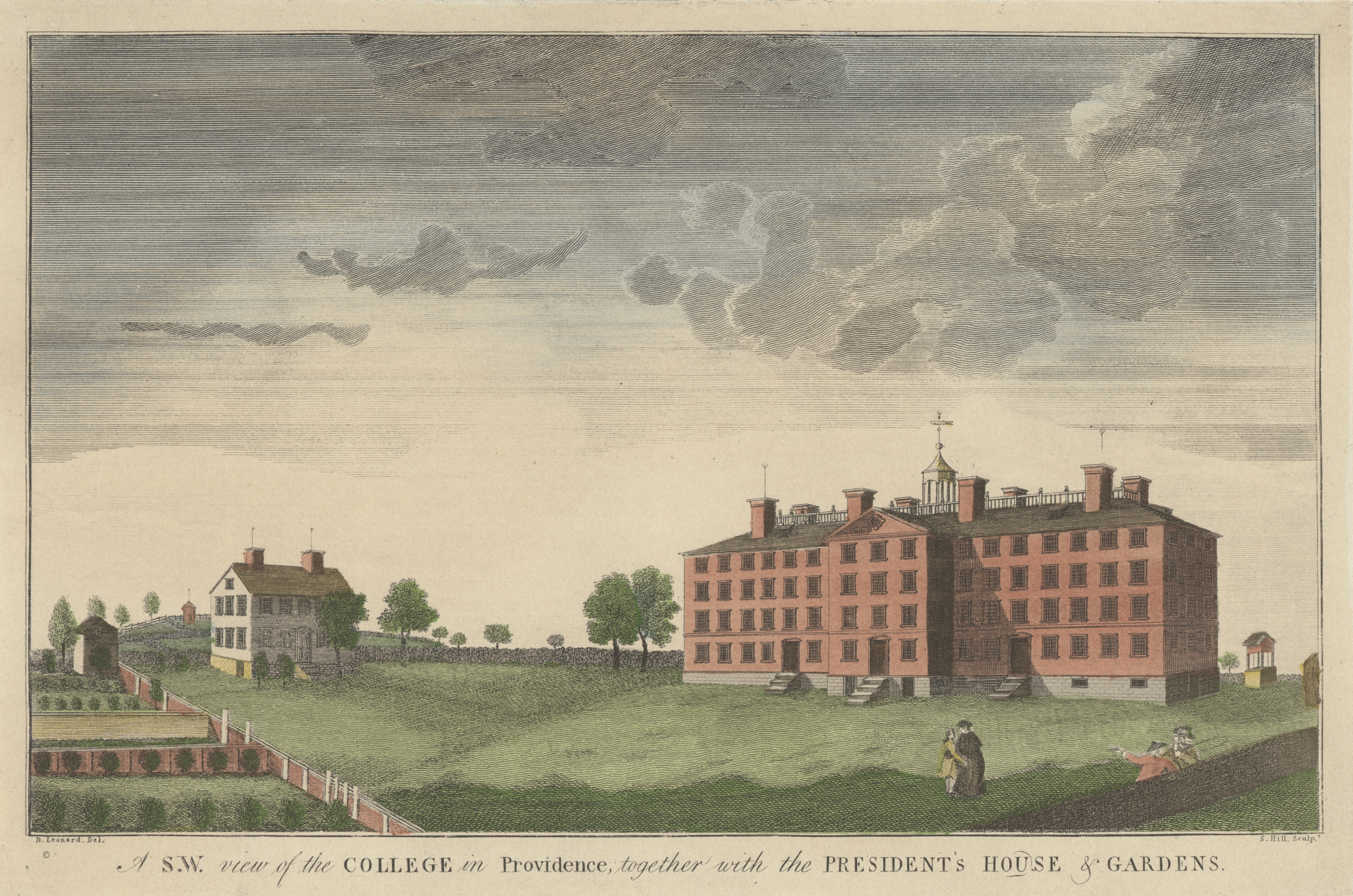
This 1792 engraving is the first published image of Brown. University Hall stands on right while the President's House sits on the left.

=== American Revolution ===
During the presidency of the Reverend Manning, the building was used to house French and American troops led by General George Washington and the Comte de Rochambeau during the wait to commence their 1781 march that led to the siege of Yorktown and the Battle of the Chesapeake.

Following the departure of the French troops, President Manning petitioned the Rhode Island General Assembly as follows:

That the College edifice was first taken in December, 1776, for the use of barracks and a hospital for the American troops, and retained for that use until the Fall before the arrival of his most Christian Majesty's fleets and armies in this State; – that, by our direction, the President resumed the course of education in said College, and took possession of the edifice on the 10th of May, 1780; and continued so to occupy it until the authority of this State, in a short time after, granted it to the French army as an hospital, who continued to hold and use it for said purpose until the last week, when the Commissary of War of the French army delivered it up, with the keys, to his Honor the Deputy Governor; they having previously permitted the officers of the French ships in this State to place their sick in it, who still continue there; – that the building was in good repair, and occupied by upwards of thirty students when first taken for the public service; – that great injury hath been done to every part of it since taken out of the hands of the Corporation; especially by two buildings adjoining it, one an house of offal at the north end, with a vault fifteen feet deep under it, having broken down the wall of the College to facilitate the passage of the invalids from the edifice into it; from which addition the intolerable stench renders all the northern part uninhabitable; and the other a horse stable, built from the east projection to the north end, by which the house is greatly weakened; many of the windows are also taken entirely out of the house, and others so broken, as well as the slate on the roof, that the storms naturally beat into it. ...

=== 19th century ===
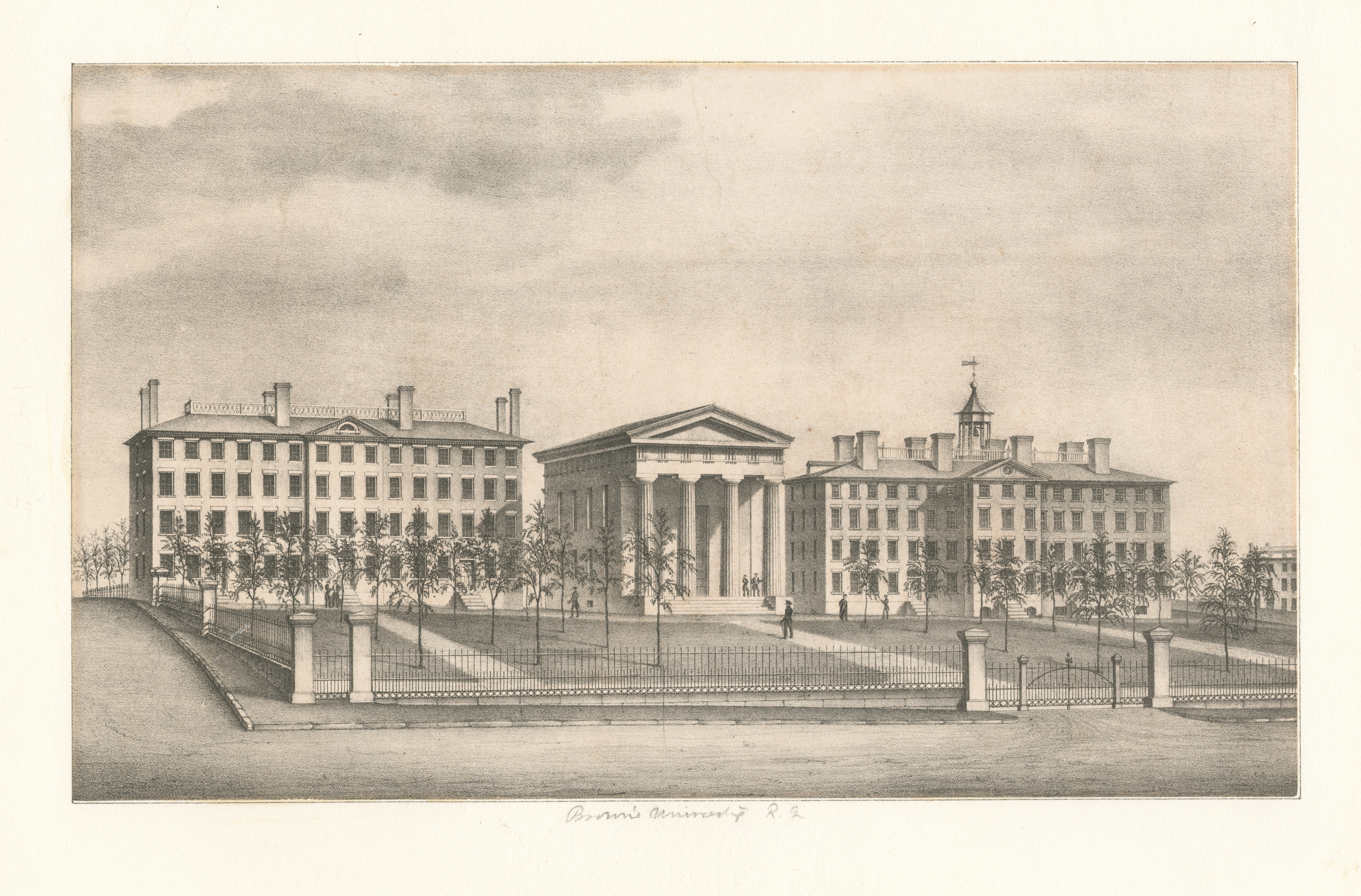
An 1840 view of the front campus. University Hall is visible on the right.

The name of the building was changed from the College Edifice to University Hall in 1823 following the construction of Brown's second building, Hope College. In 1834, following the construction of neighboring Manning Hall, the exterior of University Hall was coated with cement. At this time, the original wooden balustrade was removed from the roof. In 1843, the structure was again turned over to the military for use in suppressing the Dorr Rebellion. In 1883, a large renovation of the building's interior was undertaken by Gould & Angell, including the introduction of steam heating and gas lighting.

=== 20th century ===
The building was further renovated in 1905 following a donation by Providence resident Marsden J. Perry. This effort involved the removal of the plaster that had been applied to the building's exterior in the 1830s (mirroring the adjacent Manning Hall) as well as the restoration of the belfry and windows.

On May 11, 1927, a tablet placed on University Hall was dedicated to the memory of General Nathanael Greene, who had received an honorary degree from Brown in 1776, by the First Light Infantry Regiment of Rhode Island.

Renovations took place once again in 1939. Led by Perry, Shaw & Hepburn, this renovation saw the replacement of the building's foundation and the restoration of the building's chimneys and cupola. At the rededication of University Hall on May 4, 1940, French ambassador Comte René Doynel de Saint-Quentin and Princeton president Harold W. Dodds took part in the ceremonies recalling the university's early associations with France and Princeton.

The building has been used for many different purposes at the university over the years. It currently houses the office for the president of Brown on the first floor, facing the middle campus in space first occupied by the Commons, along with other administrative offices.

The building was designated a National Historic Landmark in 1962, recognizing it as an excellent example of 18th-century academic architecture, and as key place in the life of educator Horace Mann (1796–1859), who graduated from Brown in 1819 and taught there until 1821, before embarking on a career of educational reform.

== Architecture ==
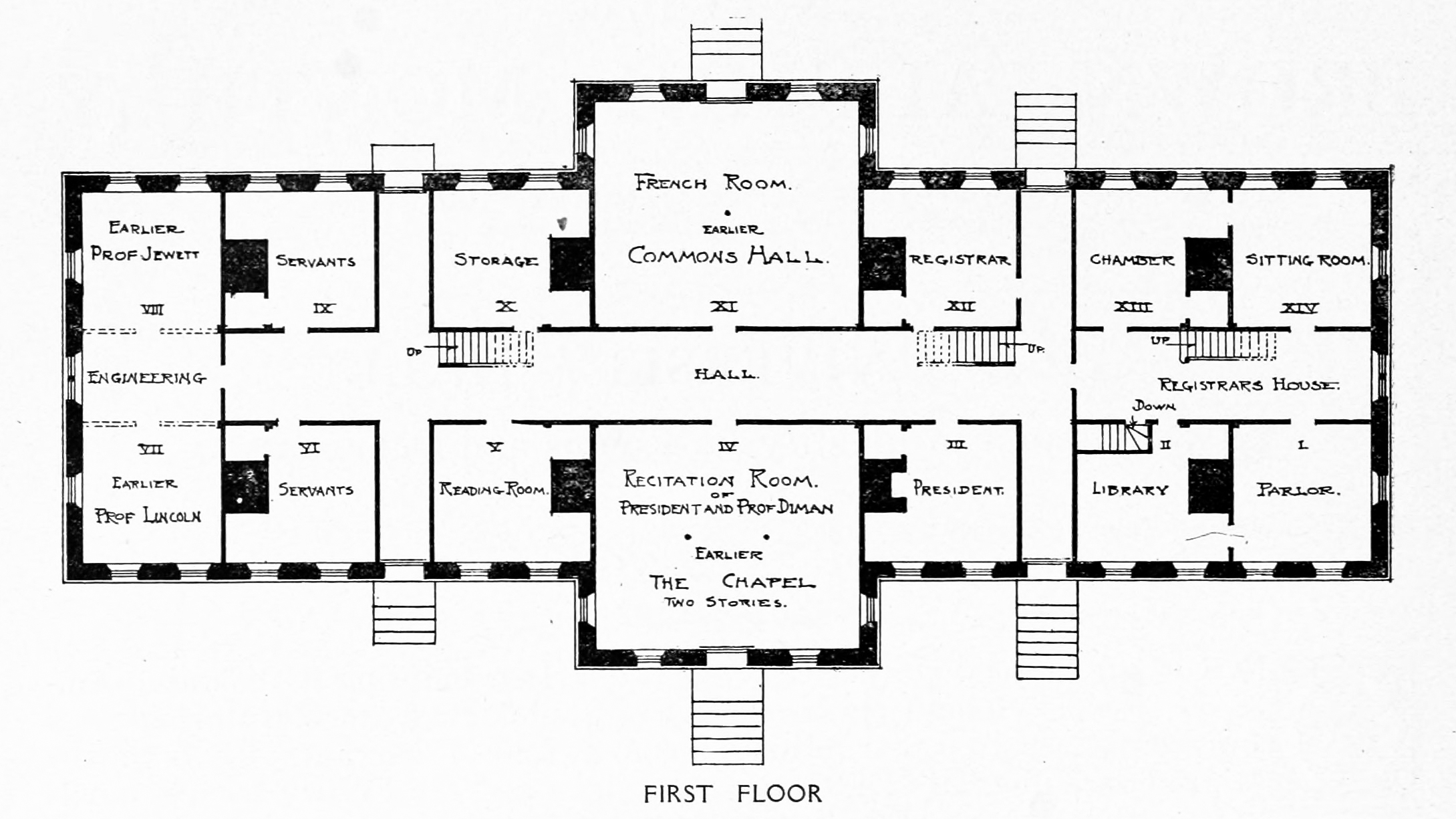
A 19th century floor plan of the building.

University Hall is a four-story, seventeen bay structure. The building's largely rectangular form measures approximately 150 long and 46 feet wide. The central three bays of the building project an additional ten feet forward, forming pedimented pavilions measuring 33 feet across. The structure's hipped roof is decorated with an ornamental balustrade and features a central cupola.

Designed in the late Georgian style, the building is constructed of red brick and decorated with white-painted, wood trim. The facade of the structure is relatively unornamented with the exception of plain brick belt courses which mark the building's stories. Brick segmental arches frame the structure's evenly spaced, double sash windows. T

Compared to coeval academic buildings, University Hall is of modest and utilitarian character. Speaking of the building's design, architectural historian Henry-Russell Hitchcock wrote "academic design could hardly be further reduced to its essentials of solid mass, sound proportions and regular rhythm." The building is notable for its projecting pediment bays on the west and east side, which was influenced by Renaissance ideas of buildings with clear focal points and vistas.

=== Architect ===
There is some ambiguity surrounding the architect of University Hall. Historical sources have attributed the structure to a variety of architects, including Joseph Brown, Robert Smith, and Joseph Horatio Anderson.

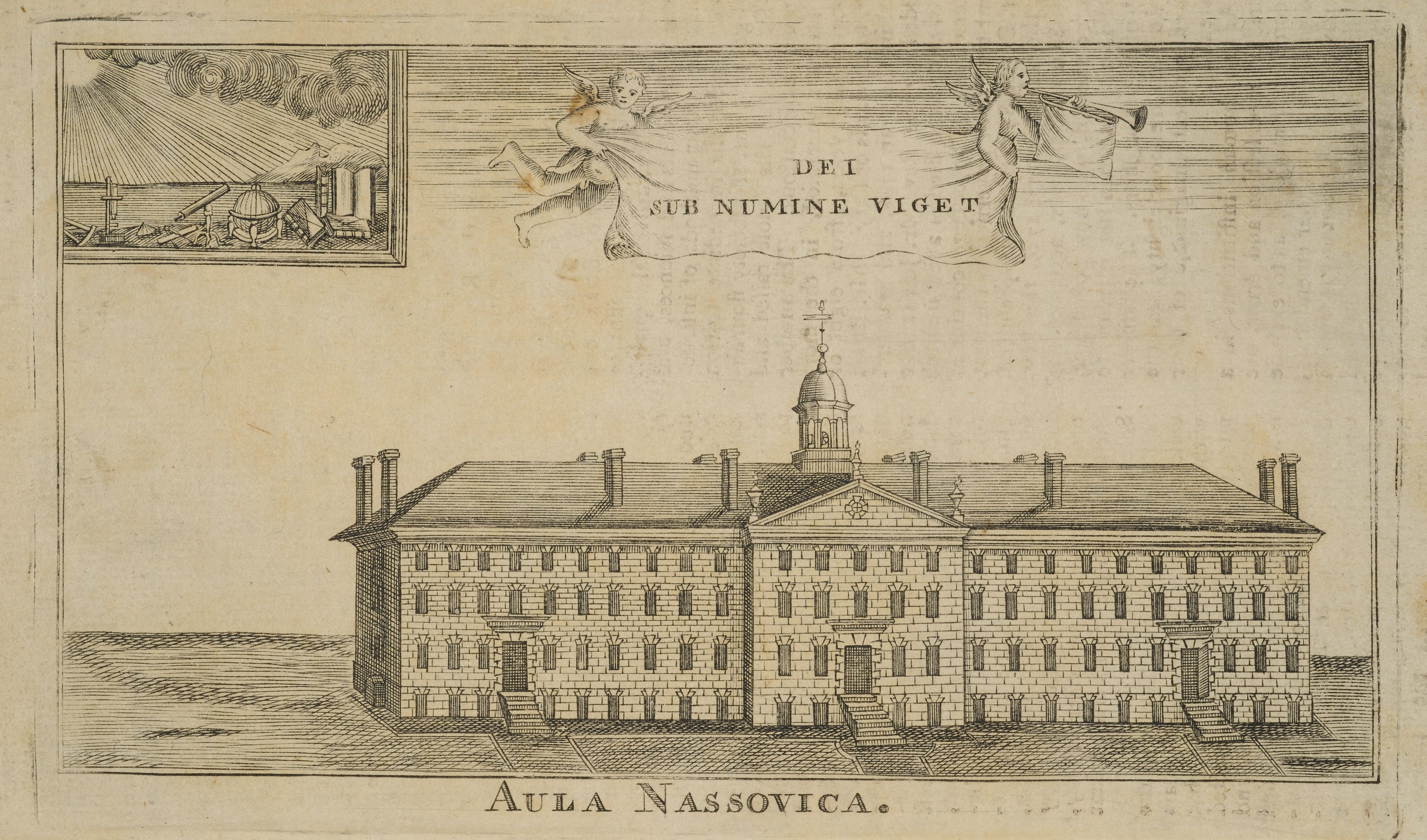
University Hall bears a strong resemblance to Nassau Hall at Princeton, as it appeared prior to alterations

Joseph Brown is most frequently posited as the chief architect of the structure. While Brown was clearly involved in the design process, historian Lawrence C. Wroth disputes sources attributing the structure solely to the amateur architect. According to Wroth, "an architectural commission and not Joseph Brown alone was responsible for the choice of a design."

Architectural historian Bryant F. Tolles Jr. notes that Philadelphia architect Robert Smith may have visited Providence during the building's planning and contributed to its design.

In a letter dated March 14, 1770, architect Joseph Horatio Anderson offered his services to the new college. The correspondence, however, was received only after construction on the building had begun.

Nassau Hall, built 14 years prior at the College of New Jersey, is often cited as the model for the building. James Manning, Brown's first president and active member of the building process, was educated at Princeton and may have suggested that Brown's first building resemble that of his alma mater.

== Gallery ==
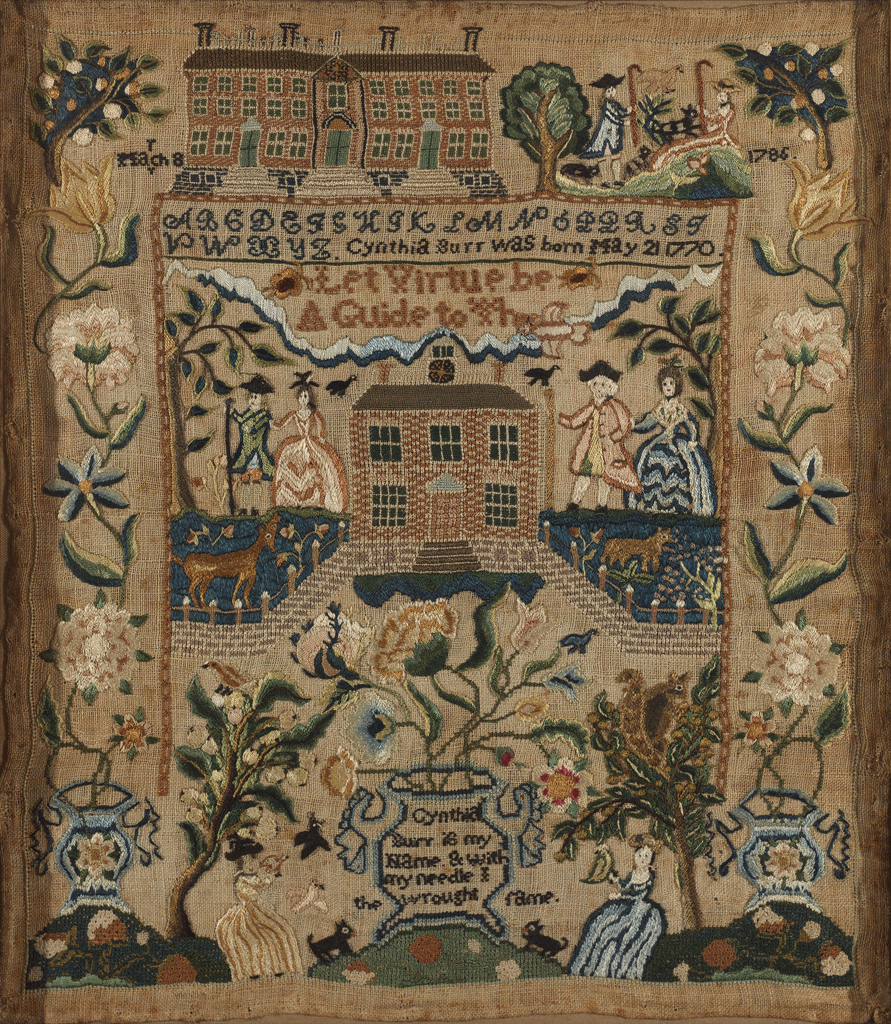
This 1786 sampler features University Hall (upper left) and the Old State House (center).

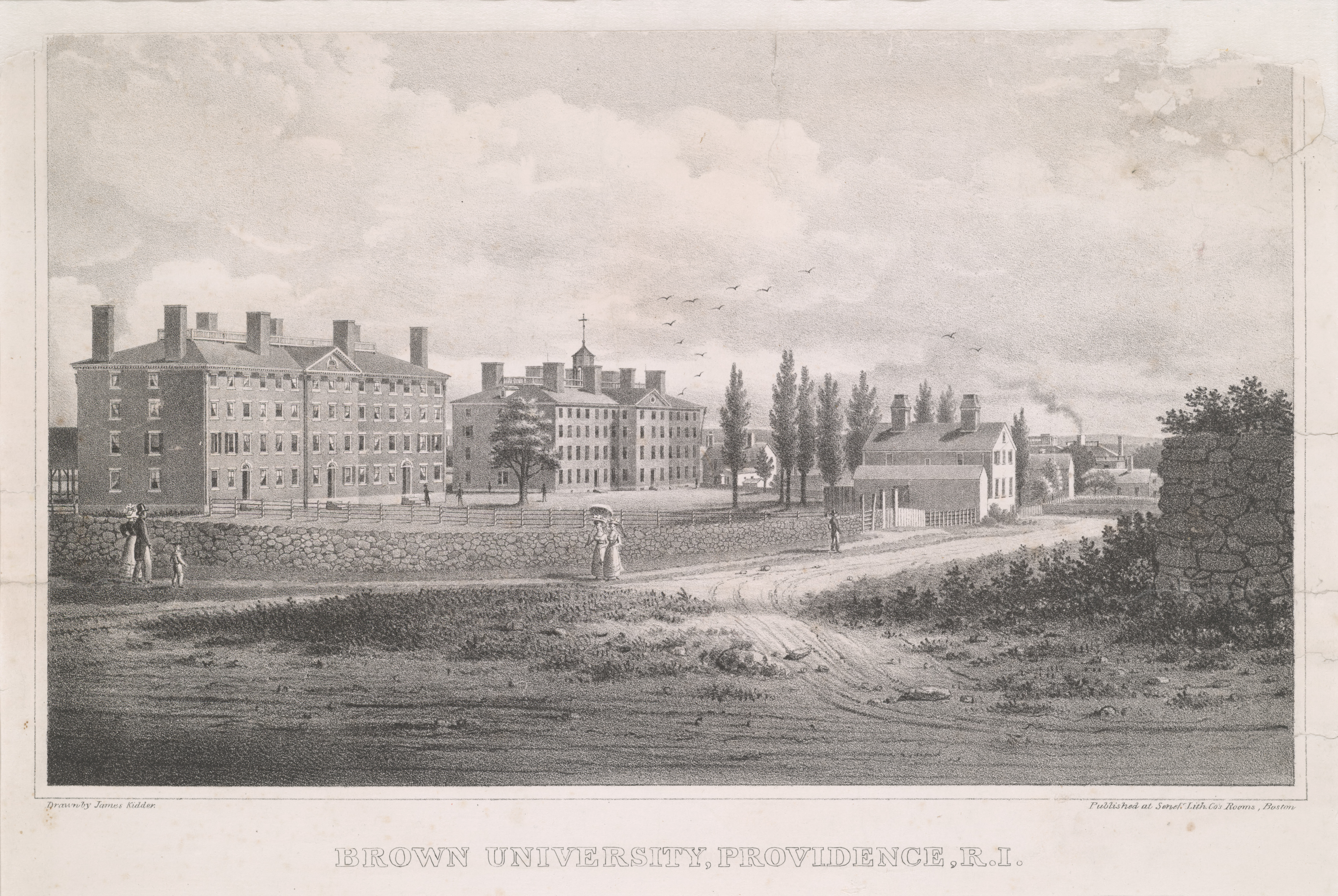
This c. 1829 lithograph shows University Hall (center) and the then-newly completed Hope College (left)

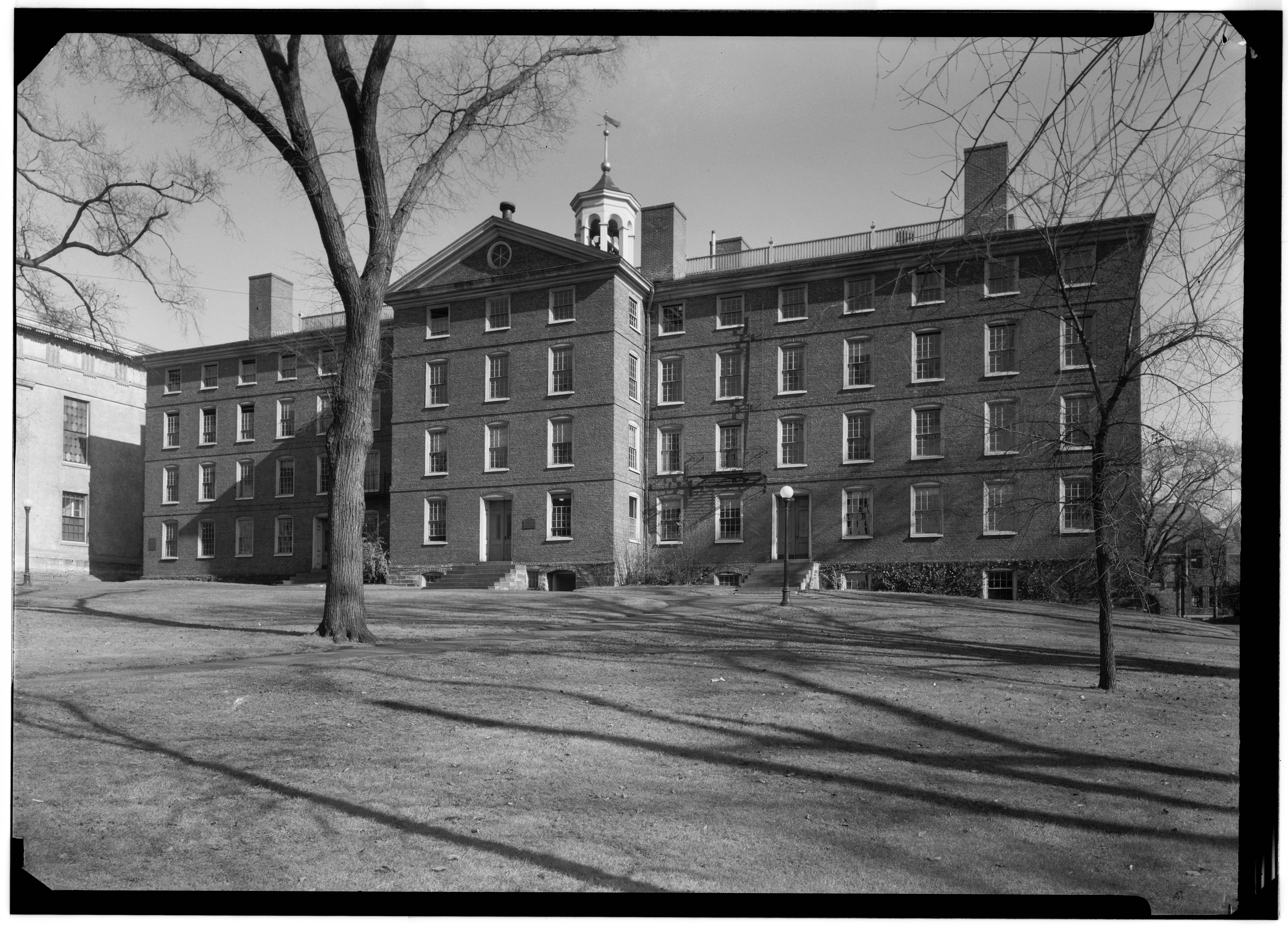
University Hall in 1937, prior to the 1939 renovation.

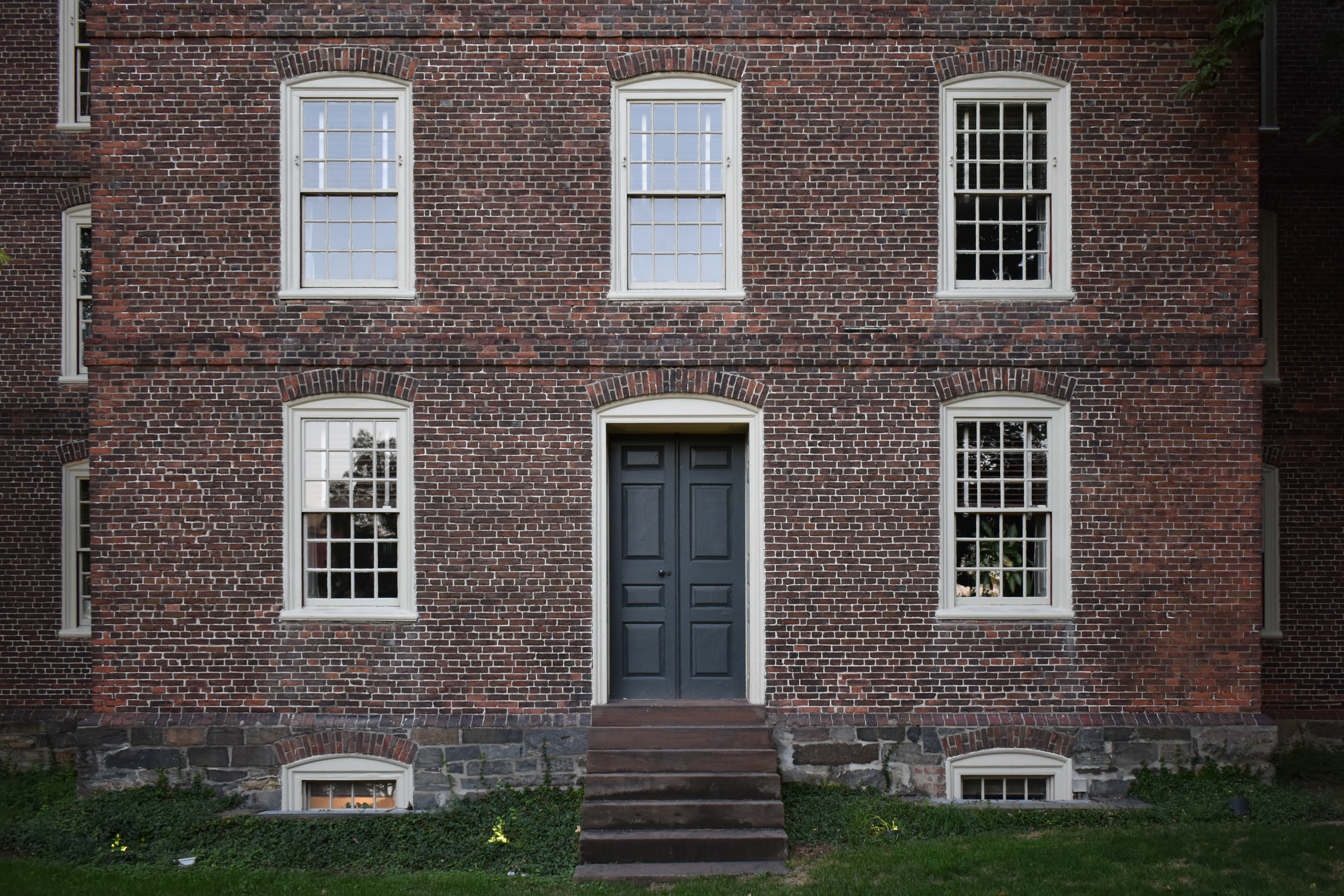
The western facade of University Hall.

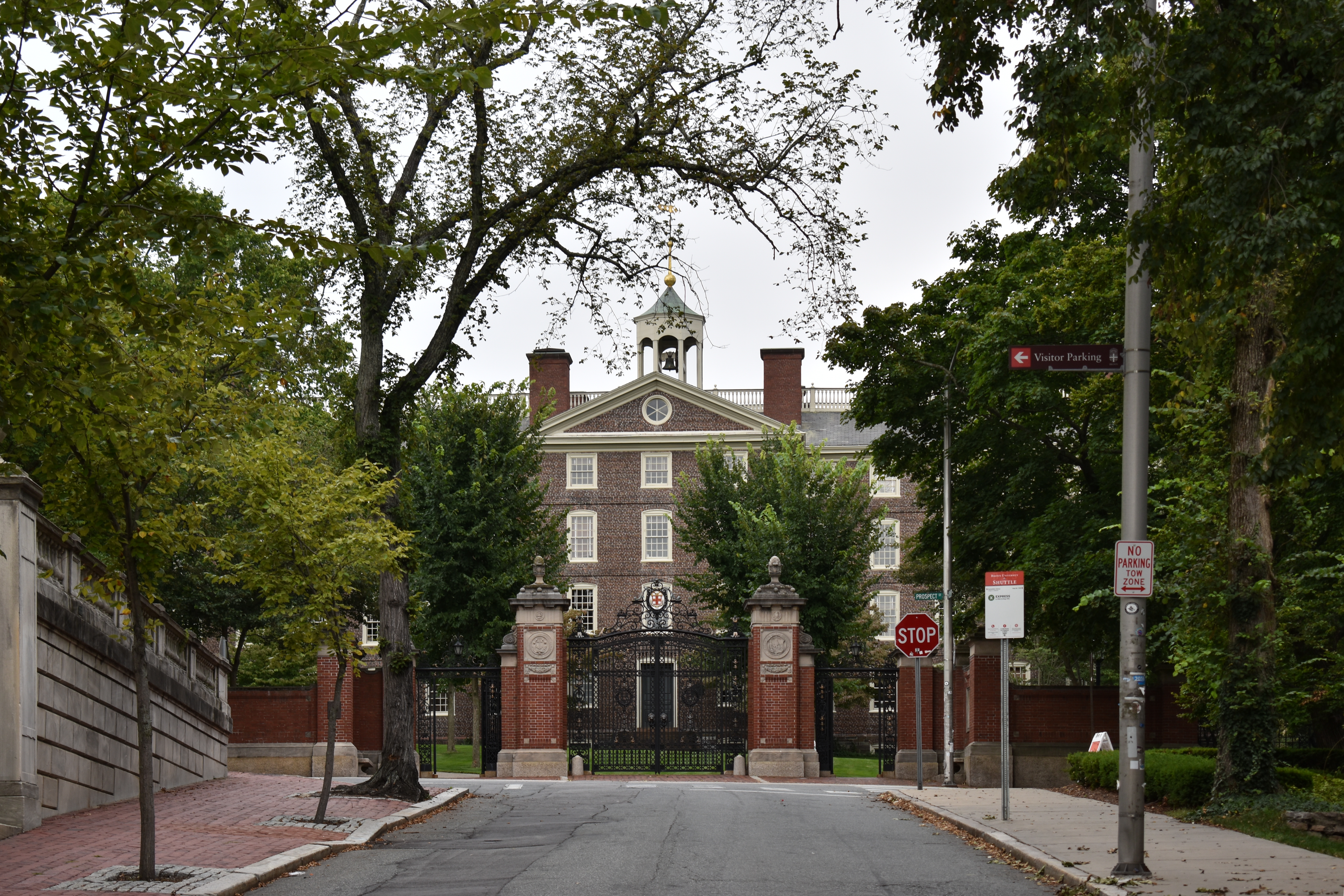
The Van Wickle Gates, erected in 1901, frame the building.

== See also ==
- List of National Historic Landmarks in Rhode Island
- National Register of Historic Places listings in Providence, Rhode Island
- List of historic sites preserved along Rochambeau's route
