= FitzRandolph Gate =

- Fitzrandolph Gate
- U.S. Historic district – Contributing property
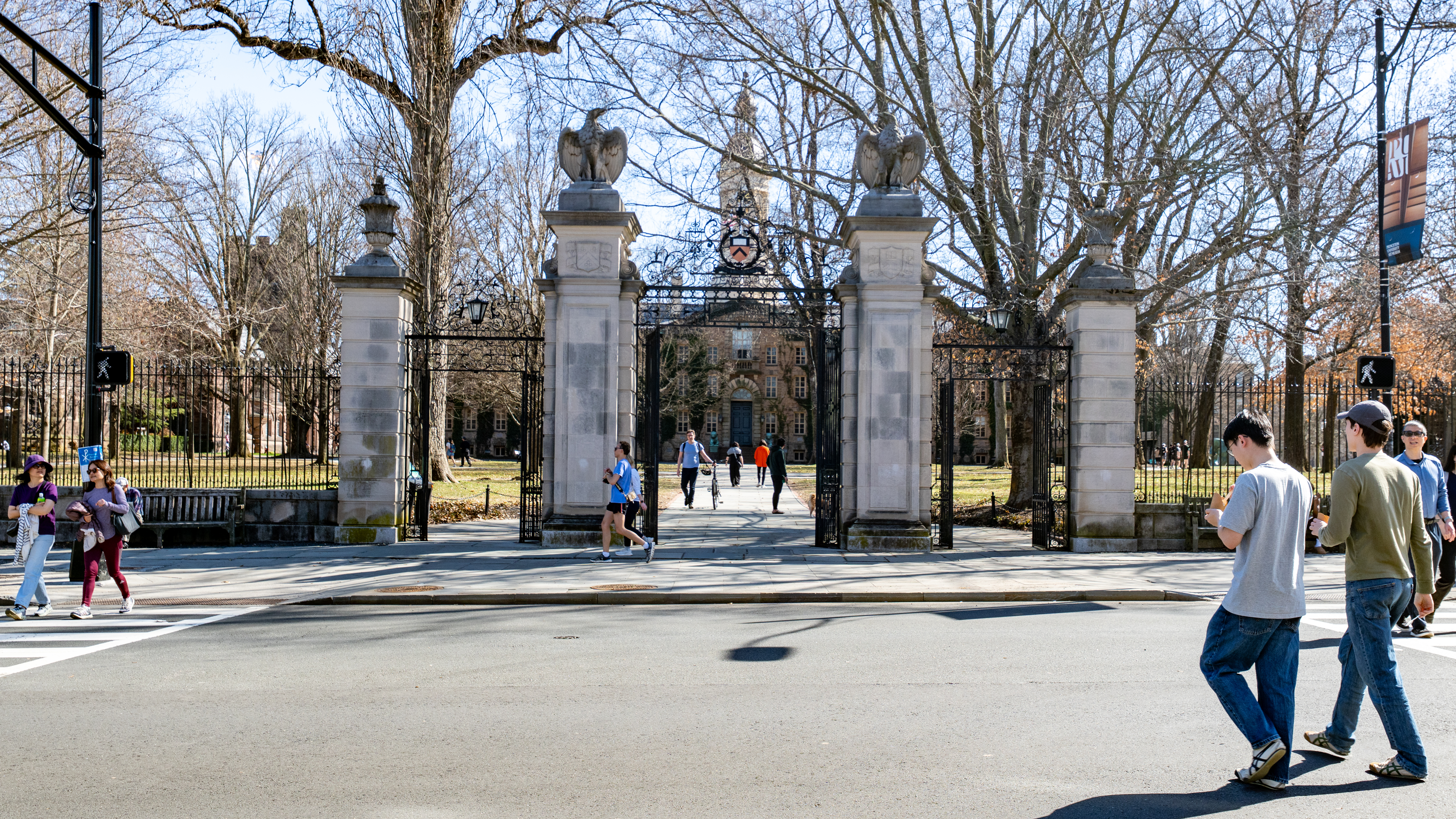
- FitzRandolph Gate with Nassau Hall behind

- Location within Mercer County, New Jersey Location within New Jersey Location within the United States
- Location: 91 Nassau St., Princeton, NJ
- Coordinates: 40°20′58.6″N 74°39′35.0″W
- Built: 1905
- Architect: McKim, Mead & White
- Architectural style: Georgian ironwork
- Part of: Princeton Historic District (ID75001143)
- Designated CP: 27 June 1975

FitzRandolph Gate is a wrought-iron structure that serves as the official entrance of Princeton University, standing in front of Nassau Hall on Nassau Street in Princeton, New Jersey. The gate was funded by a bequest of Augustus Van Wickle in honor of his great-grandfather, Nathaniel FitzRandolph, who had donated to the university the land on which Nassau Hall sits. The gate was completed in 1905 and was designed by McKim, Mead & White. The gate remained closed and locked apart from graduation and the P-rade until 1970, when that graduating class ensured that it would always remain open, "in a symbol of the University's openness to the local and worldwide community."

At commencement each year the graduating seniors process out of the gates to mark the completion of their time at Princeton. A widespread legend exists on campus that students who walk out of the gates before graduation will not finish their degree. In 2004 a tradition was added at Princeton's opening exercises called the Pre-Rade where the matriculating freshmen march into the gates behind the banners of their residential colleges to mark their entrance into Princeton.

== History ==
Nathaniel FitzRandolph (1703–1780) was a son of one of the original 17th-century Quaker settlers of Princeton. He was instrumental in raising the funds necessary to bring the College of New Jersey, as Princeton University was then known, to the town. FitzRandolph personally donated the four and half acres for Nassau Hall. His great-grandson, Augustus Van Wickle, died in a skeet-shooting accident in 1898 and he provided in his will for both the Van Wickle Gates at his alma mater, Brown University, and the FitzRandolph Gates in honor of his great-grandfather. The gate was restored in 2005 for its centenary with some original elements needing to be reconstructed. Over 230 pieces of cast metal were replaced and all new and restored parts were made of authentic wrought iron from England, using traditional blacksmithing tools and techniques.

Nathaniel FitzRandolph died in 1780 and was buried nearby in his family plot. In 1909, during the construction of Holder Hall, 32 family graves were discovered. At Woodrow Wilson's direction, the remains were re-interred under the eastern arch of the new hall and a plaque was erected to commemorate FitzRandolph. It is inscribed with the Latin phrase:

In agro jacet nostro immo suo,
In our ground he sleeps, nay, rather in his own.

== Gallery ==
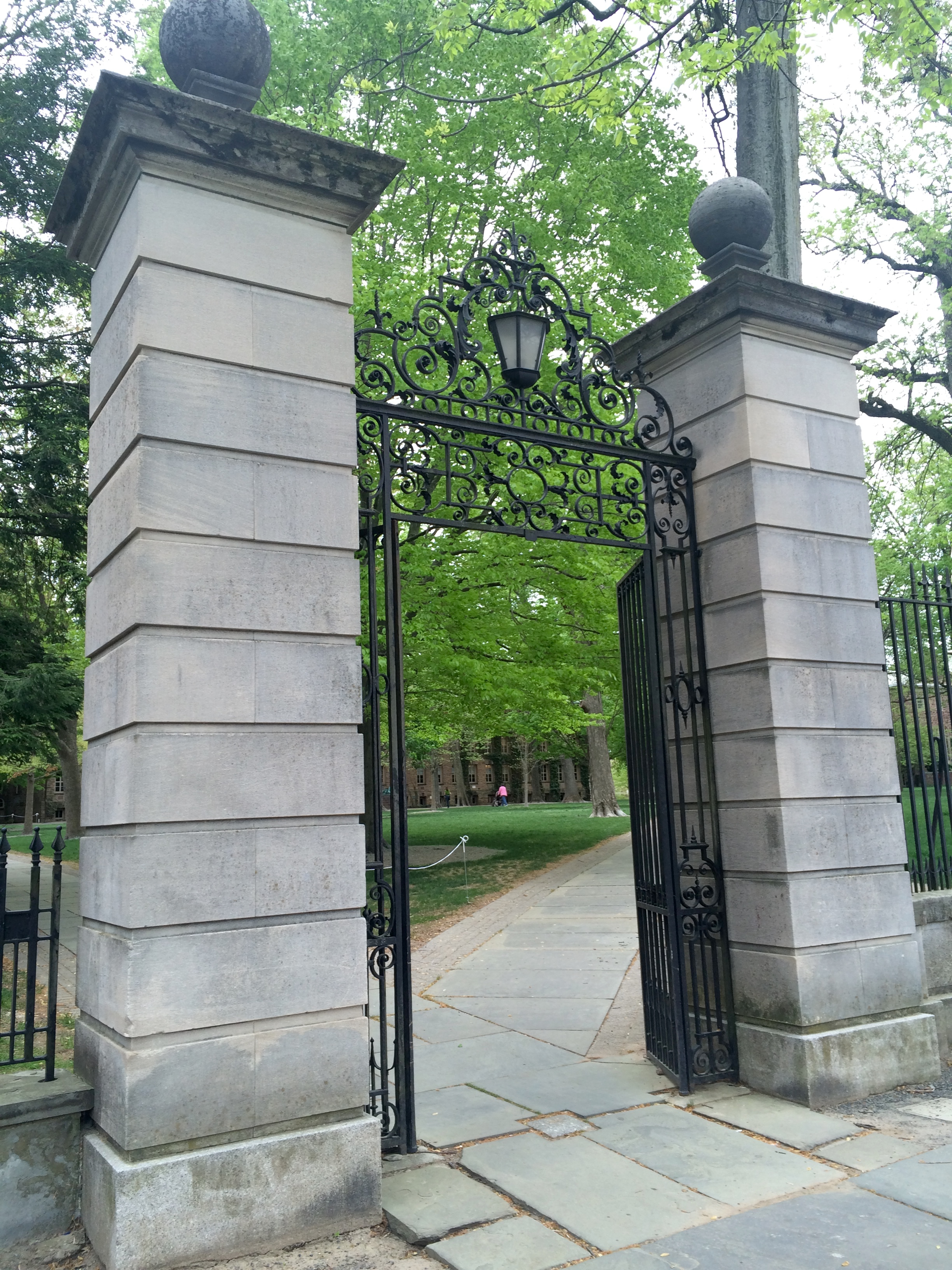
A secondary gate, near Joseph Henry House

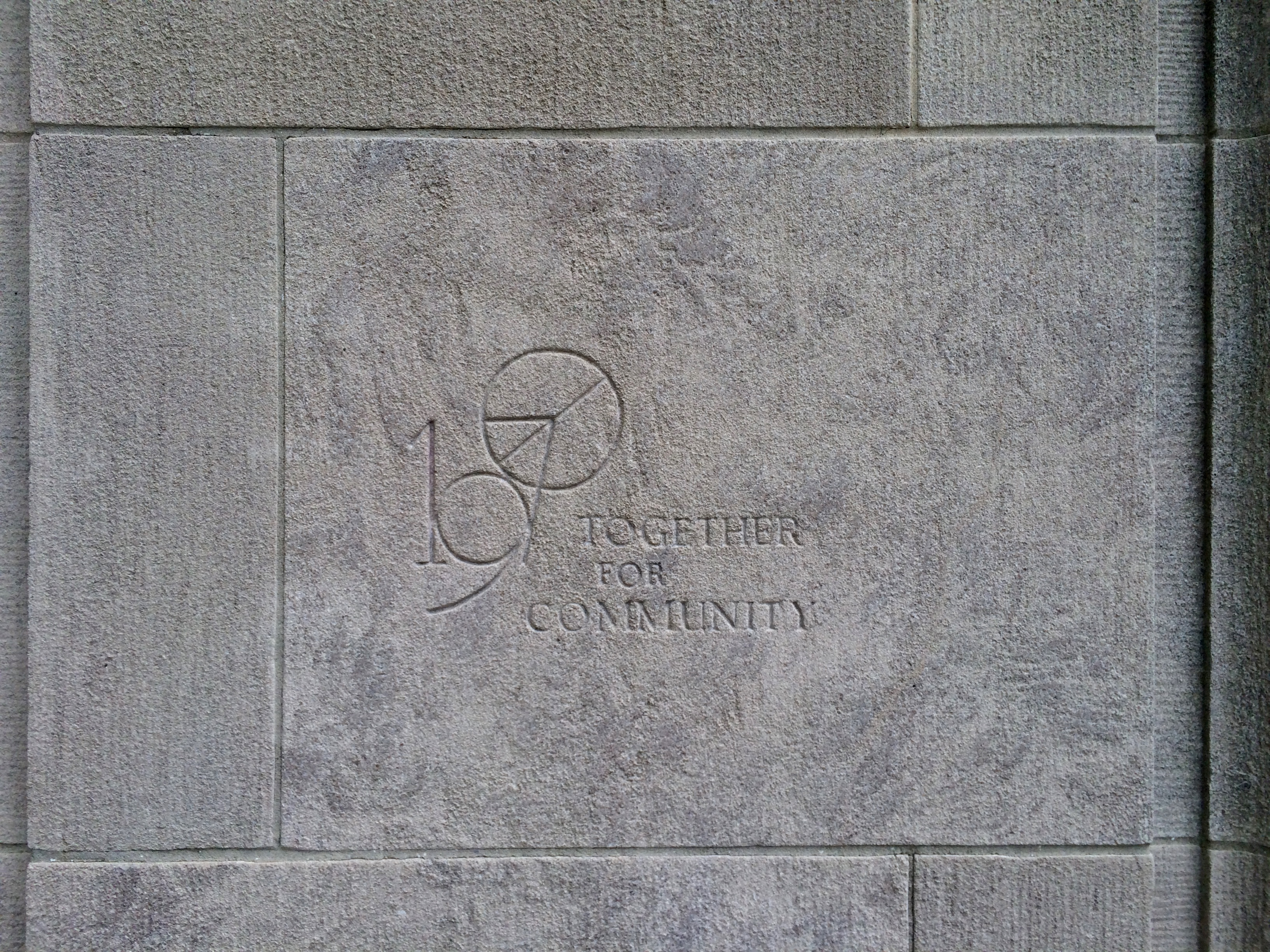
Inscription commemorating the Princeton class of 1970, whose efforts led to the opening of the gates on a permanent basis

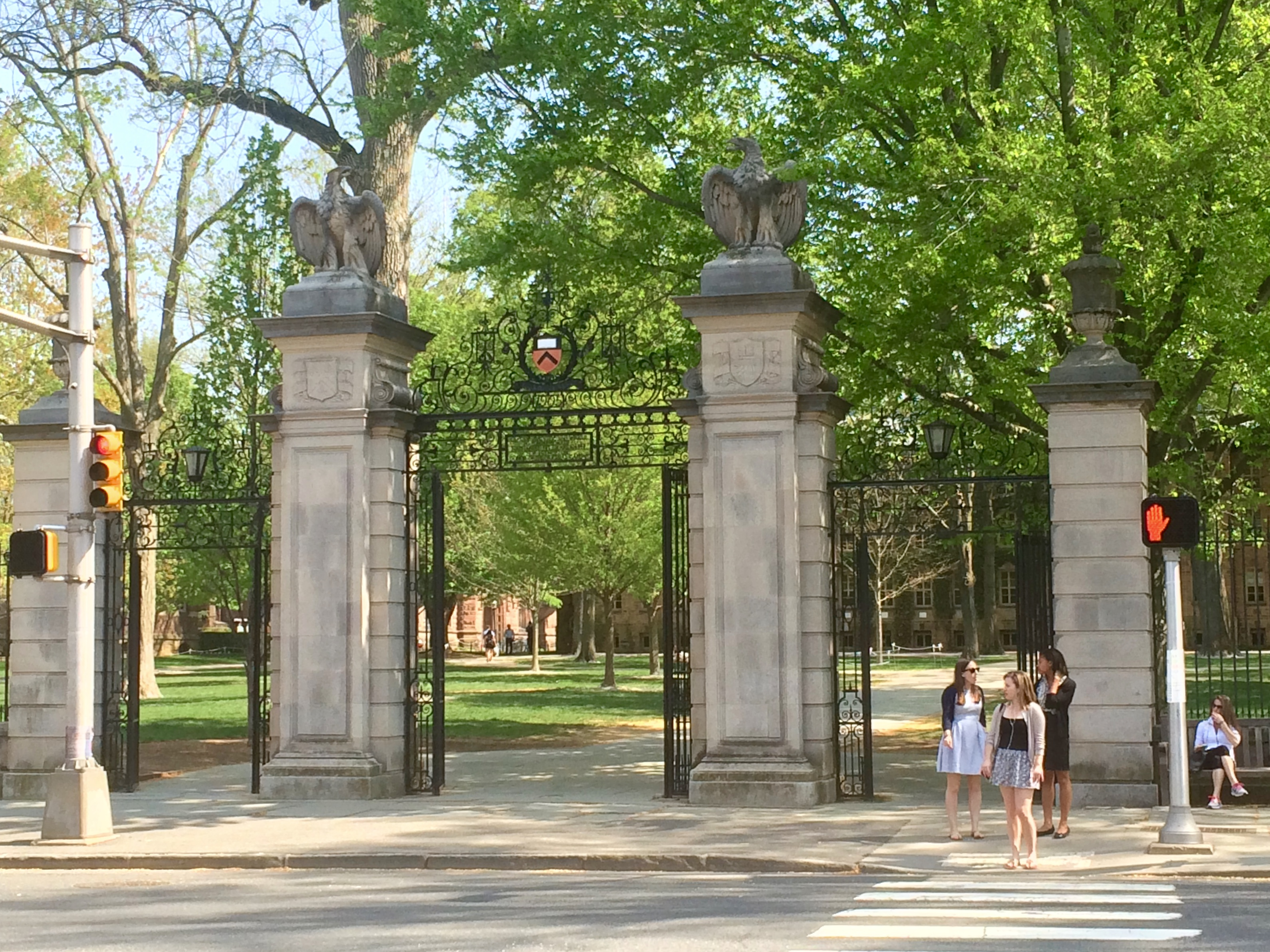
Undergraduates avoid exiting the central gate, instead using the flanking gates

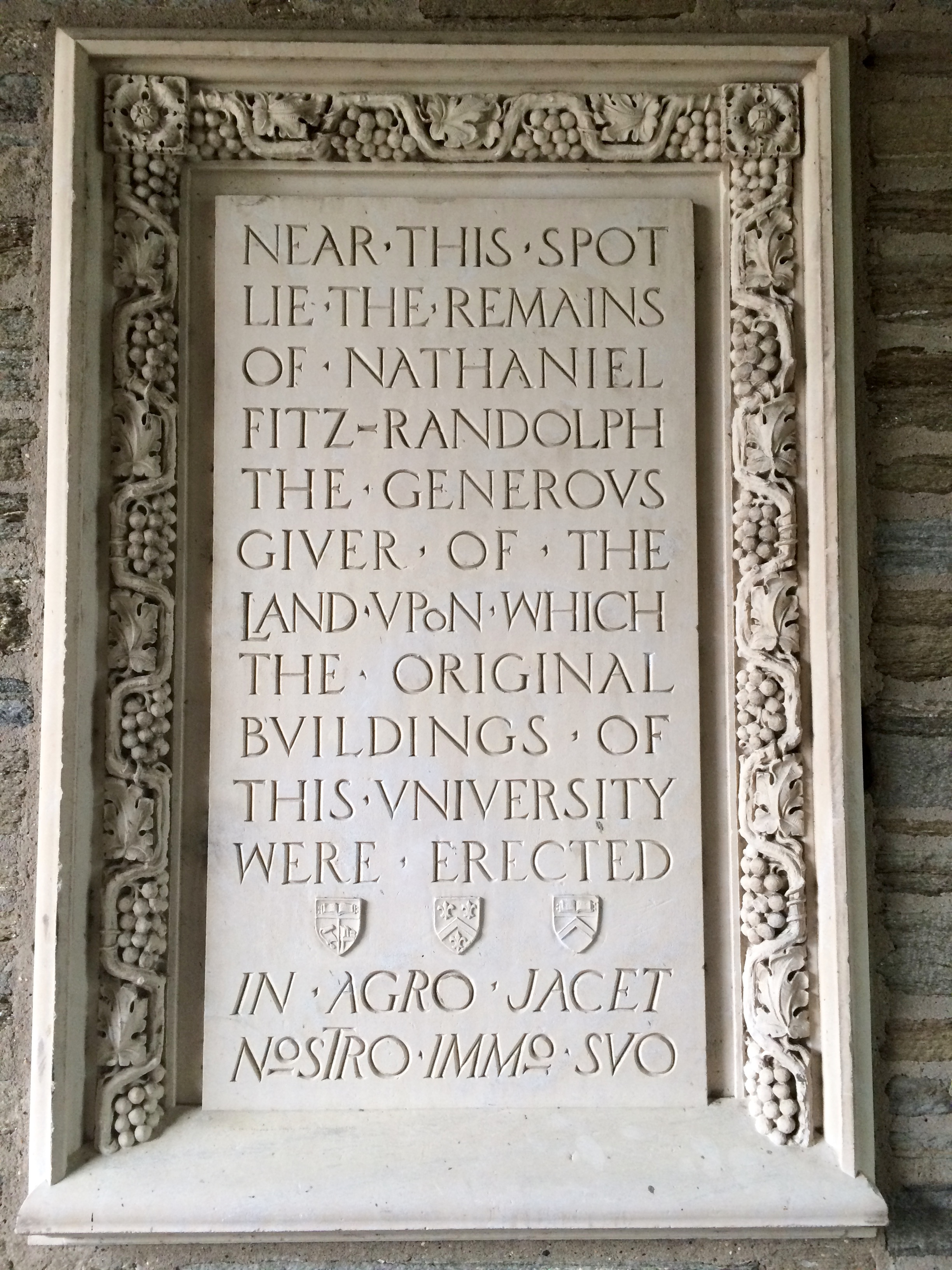
A plaque in the eastern archway of Holder Hall commemorating the burial place of Nathaniel FitzRandolph

== See also ==
- Van Wickle Gates, the official entrance of Brown University, also funded by Augustus Van Wickle
- Gates of Harvard Yard, a series of gates of Harvard Yard, including Johnston Gate and gates dedicated to specific graduating classes.
