= Selected Letters of H. P. Lovecraft V (1934–1937) =

Collection of letters

Selected Letters V (1934-1937)
- Dust-jacket by Ronald Rich and Gary Gore for Selected Letters V (1934-1937)
- Author: H. P. Lovecraft
- Cover artist: Ronald Rich, Virgil Finlay and Gary Gore
- Language: English
- Subject: letters
- Publisher: Arkham House
- Publication date: 1976
- Publication place: United States
- Media type: Print (Hardback)
- Pages: xxxvii, 437 pp
- ISBN: 0-87054-036-X
- OCLC: 20590839
- Preceded by: Selected Letters of H. P. Lovecraft IV (1932–1934)

Selected Letters V (1934-1937) is a collection of letters by H. P. Lovecraft. It was released in 1976 by Arkham House in an edition of 5,138 copies. It is the fifth of a five volume series of collections of Lovecraft's letters and includes a preface by James Turner.

== Contents ==
Selected Letters V (1934-1937) includes letters to:

- Robert Bloch
- Duane W. Rimel
- F. Lee Baldwin
- R. H. Barlow
- Emil Petaja
- Henry Kuttner
- Richard F. Searight
- C. L. Moore
- Kenneth Sterling
- Willis Conover
