= Coat of arms of Brown University =

- Adopted: September 3, 1833; 191 years ago
- Crest: A demi-sun issuant radiant or through clouds argent
- Torse: Argent and gules
- Shield: Argent, a cross gules between four open books of the first, bound of the second.
- Motto: In Deo Speramus

The Brown University coat of arms is the assumed heraldic achievement of Brown University. The achievement in its current iteration was adopted in 1834.

The blazon of the achievement is

Argent, a cross gules between four open books of the first, bound of the second. Crest: a demi-sun issuant radiant or through clouds argent.

== History ==
=== First seal (1765–1784) ===
Brown's first seal was procured in 1765 by Reverend Samuel Stillman following the second meeting of the University Corporation in Newport. This seal, produced in Boston for a cost of ten pounds thirteen shillings sterling, featured busts of George III and Charlotte of Mecklenburg-Strelitz—then the British monarchs—in profile. The outer edge of this seal read "Sigillum Collegii in Colonia Ins. Rhod. & Provid. Plant". This seal is featured on Marston Hall and a western-facing pendentive of the Sharpe Refectory.

History of the Seal

1765
First Seal

The profiles of George III and Charlotte of Mecklenburg-Strelitz

1784
Second Seal

Temple to knowledge with the names of the seven liberal arts

1805
Current Seal

The coat of arms of Brown University

Present

=== Second seal (1784–1805) ===
In September 1782 the University Corporation resolved to reconcile matters of the charter "inconsistent with our present state of national independence". At this meeting, the Corporation organized a committee, consisting of Jabez Bowen, James Manning, and Henry Ward to break the original seal and produce new heraldry for the college.

The second seal was adopted on September 3, 1784, and may have been designed in part by Solomon Drowne. This design substituted the word "Colonia" with "Republica" and replaced the monarchs' portraits with an image of a domed temple "sacred to knowledge". The building's five front columns and the spaces between them are inscribed with the names of the seven liberal arts. Above the dome a scroll reads "Virtus magis colenda", meaning "virtue is more to be cultivated." The structure's cornice and base are inscribed respectively with the words "Scientiae S[acrum]" and "Patet Omnibus," referring to a temple of learning that is open to all.

=== Current seal ===
In his September 1833 report to the corporation, President Francis Wayland noted that the seal had not been updated to reflect the university's 1804 renaming from Rhode Island College to Brown University. Accordingly, the corporation organized a committee to design a new seal. The third and current seal was adopted on September 3, 1834.

The coat of arms was modernized by Chermayeff & Geismar & Haviv.

== Significance ==
The anthropomorphic sun (with eyes and nose visible) and clouds on the crest represent "learning piercing the clouds of ignorance", while the cross is believed to be a Saint George's Cross. The four open books adorning the escutcheon symbolize learning, and are rumored to represent Harvard, Yale, Cambridge and Oxford–four institutional predecessors of the university.

Brown's motto in God We Hope (Latin: In Deo Speramus) has been purported to be the predecessor of the national motto of the United States, In God We Trust. Salmon P. Chase, the 25th United States Secretary of the Treasury and man responsible for the motto, was a companion of Sprague family, benefactors of the university.

== Gallery ==
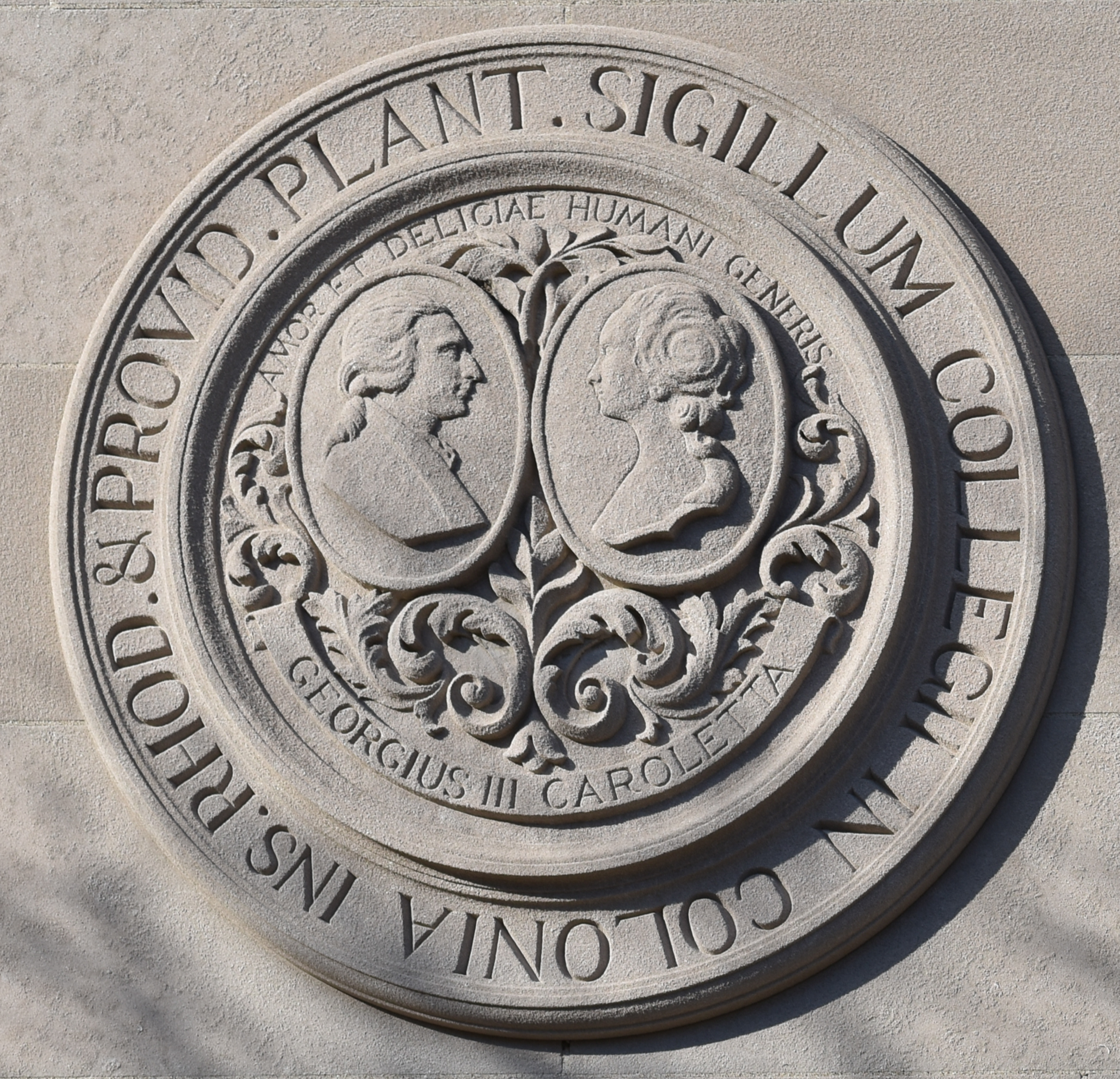
The First Seal on the facade of Marston Hall (1926).

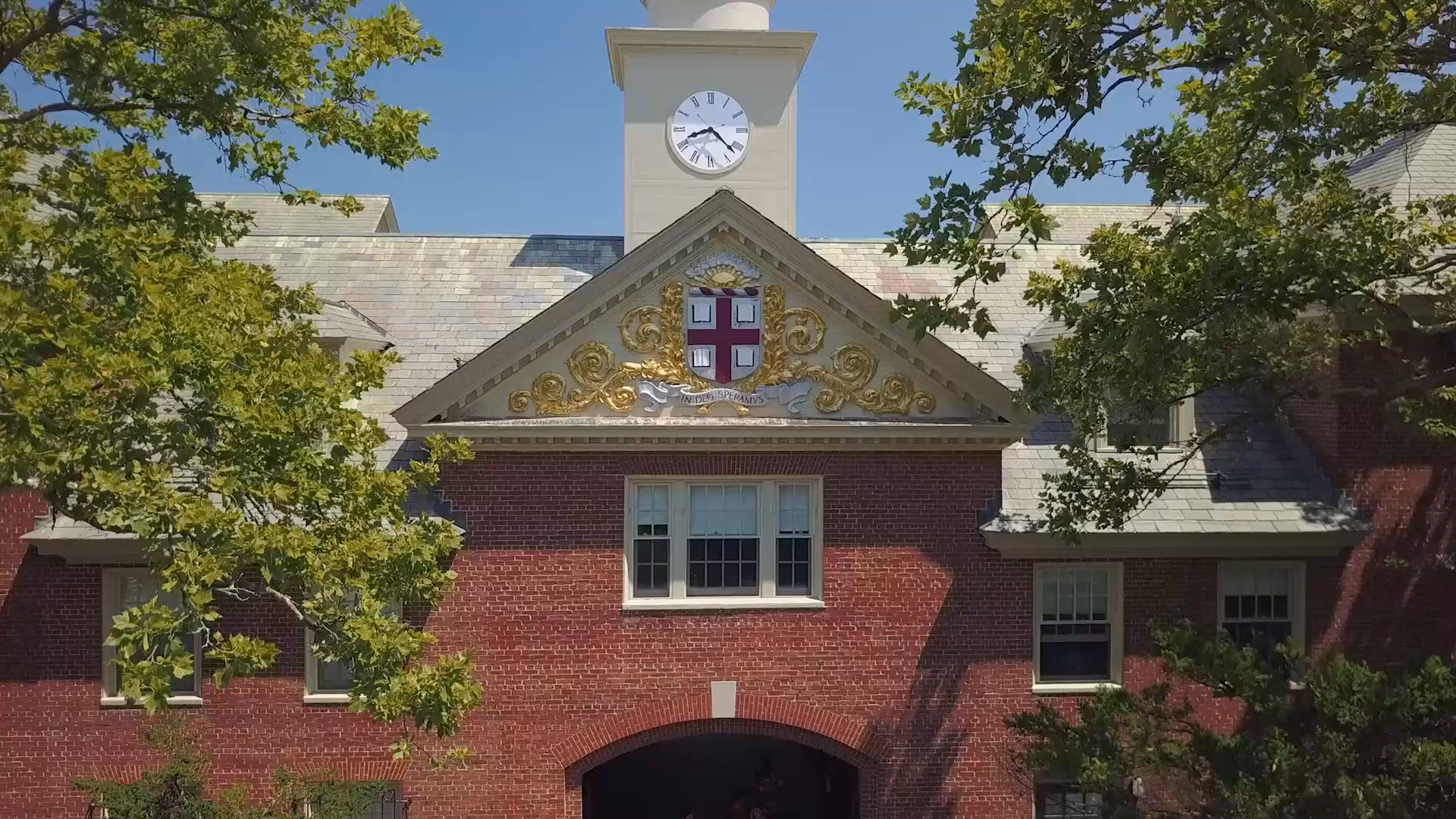
The current seal decorates the pediment above Wayland Arch

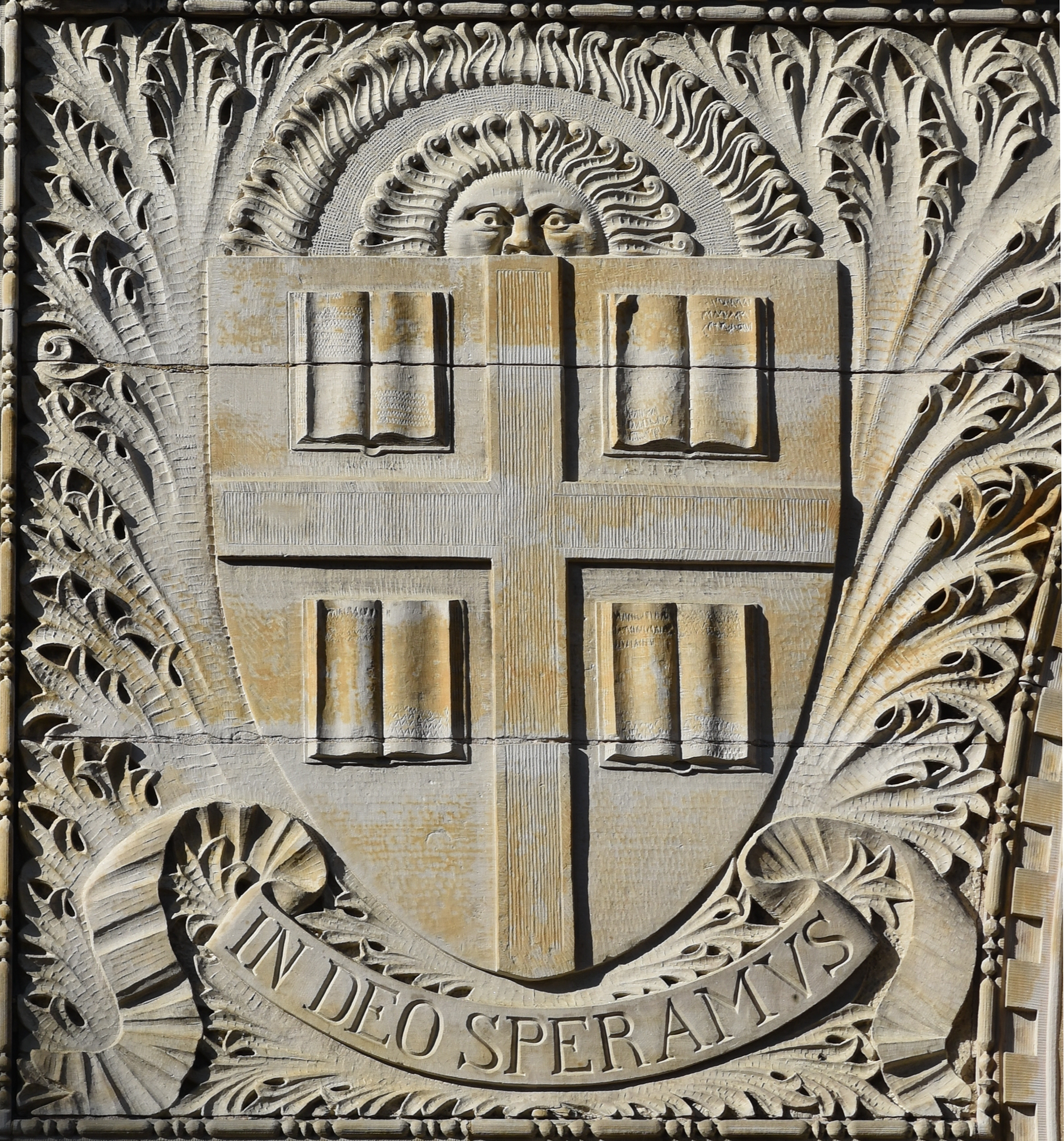
A nonstandard rendition of the seal on Lyman Hall (1891).

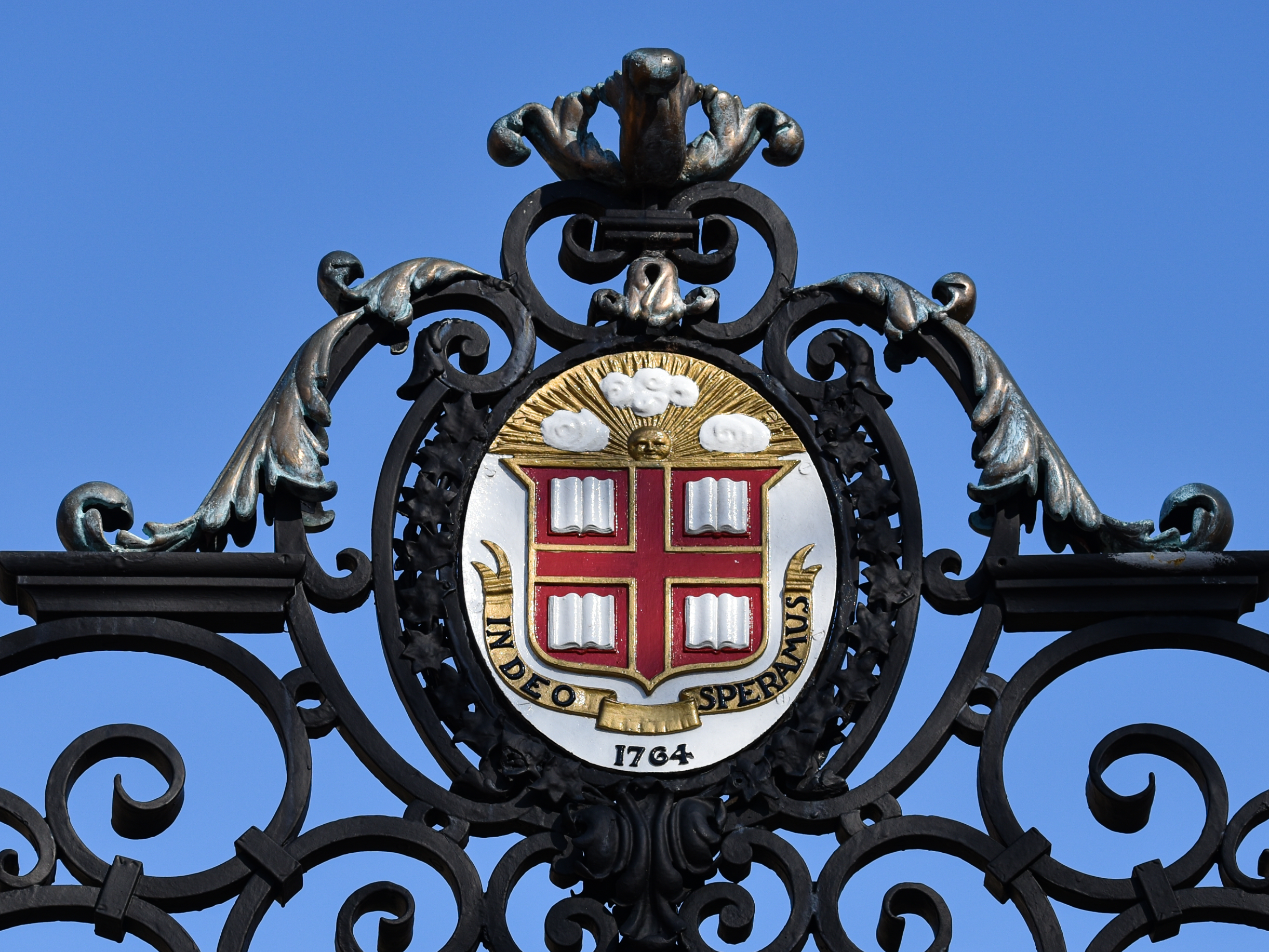
The current seal above the Van Wickle Gates (1901)

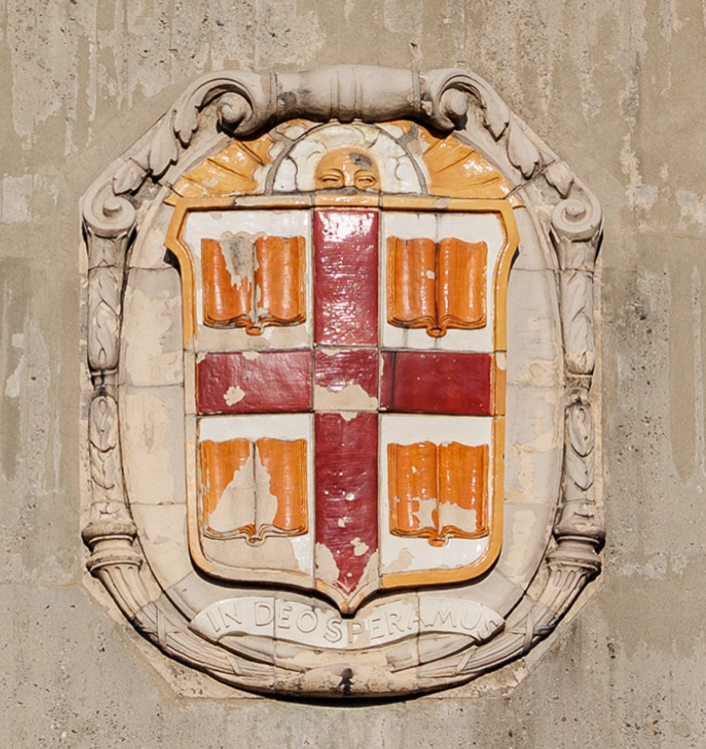
The current seal on the Brown Stadium
