= Selected Letters of H. P. Lovecraft IV (1932–1934) =

Collection of letters by Howard Phillips Lovecraft

Selected Letters IV (1932-1934)
- Dust-jacket by Ronald Rich and Gary Gore for Selected Letters IV (1932-1934)
- Author: H. P. Lovecraft
- Cover artist: Ronald Rich, Virgil Finlay and Gary Gore
- Language: English
- Subject: letters
- Publisher: Arkham House
- Publication date: 1976
- Publication place: United States
- Media type: Print (Hardback)
- Pages: xxxii, 424 pp
- ISBN: 0-87054-035-1
- OCLC: 20590805
- Preceded by: Selected Letters of H. P. Lovecraft III (1929–1931)
- Followed by: Selected Letters of H. P. Lovecraft V (1934-1937)

Selected Letters IV (1932–1934) is a collection of letters by H. P. Lovecraft. It was released in 1976 by Arkham House in an edition of 4,978 copies. It is the fourth of a five volume series of collections of Lovecraft's letters and includes a preface by James Turner.

== Contents ==
Selected Letters IV (1932-1934) includes letters to:

- J. Vernon Shea
- Robert E. Howard
- Helen Sully
- E. Hoffmann Price
