= Selected Letters of H. P. Lovecraft I (1911–1924) =

1964 collection of letters by H. P. Lovecraft

Selected Letters I, 1911-1924
- Dust-jacket by Ronald Rich and Gary Gore for Selected Letters I (1911-1924)
- Author: H. P. Lovecraft
- Cover artist: Ronald Rich, Virgil Finlay and Gary Gore
- Language: English
- Genre: letters
- Publisher: Arkham House
- Publication date: 1964
- Publication place: United States
- Media type: Print (Hardback)
- Pages: xxix, 362 pp
- Followed by: Selected Letters of H. P. Lovecraft II (1925–1929)

Selected Letters I, 1911-1924 is a collection of letters by H. P. Lovecraft. It was released in 1964 by Arkham House in an edition of 2,504 copies. It is the first of a five volume series of collections of Lovecraft's letters and includes a preface by August Derleth and Donald Wandrei.

The five-volume series represents only a fragment of Lovecraft's correspondence.

== Contents ==
Selected Letters I, 1911-1924 includes letters to:

- Rheinhart Kleiner
- Maurice W. Moe
- Frank Belknap Long
- Clark Ashton Smith
- Lillian D. Clark

== Reprints ==
- Sauk City, WI: Arkham House, 1975 (2nd printing of 3,045 copies).
