= Selected Letters of H. P. Lovecraft II (1925–1929) =

1968 collection of letters by H. P. Lovecraft

Selected Letters II, 1925-1929
- Dust-jacket by Ronald Rich and Gary Gore for Selected Letters II, 1925-1929
- Author: H. P. Lovecraft
- Cover artist: Ronald Rich, Virgil Finlay and Gary Gore
- Language: English
- Genre: letters
- Publisher: Arkham House
- Publication date: 1968
- Publication place: United States
- Media type: Print (Hardback)
- Pages: xxiv, 359 pp
- Preceded by: Selected Letters of H. P. Lovecraft I (1911–1924)
- Followed by: Selected Letters of H. P. Lovecraft III (1929–1931)

Selected Letters II, 1925-1929 is a collection of letters by H. P. Lovecraft. It was released in 1968 by Arkham House in an edition of 2,482 copies. It is the second of a five volume series of collections of Lovecraft's letters and includes a preface by August Derleth and Donald Wandrei.

== Contents ==
Selected Letters II, 1925-1929 includes letters to:

- Lillian D. Clark
- Frank Belknap Long
- August Derleth
- Donald Wandrei
- Clark Ashton Smith
- Zealia Bishop
- Woodburn Harris

== Reprints ==
- 2nd printing of 3,041 copies, 1975.
