= Selected Letters of H. P. Lovecraft III (1929–1931) =

1971 collection of letters by H. P. Lovecraft

Selected Letters III (1929-1931)
- Dust-jacket by Ronald Rich and Gary Gore for Selected Letters III (1929-1931)
- Author: H. P. Lovecraft
- Cover artist: Ronald Rich, Virgil Finlay and Gary Gore
- Language: English
- Subject: Letters
- Genre: Non-fiction
- Publisher: Arkham House
- Publication date: 1971
- Publication place: United States
- Media type: Print (Hardback)
- Pages: xxiii, 451 pp
- ISBN: 0-87054-032-7 (reprint)
- OCLC: 228088581
- Preceded by: Selected Letters of H. P. Lovecraft II (1925–1929)
- Followed by: Selected Letters of H. P. Lovecraft IV (1932–1934)

Selected Letters III (1929-1931) is a collection of letters by H. P. Lovecraft. It was released in 1971 by Arkham House in an edition of 2,513 copies. It is the third of a five volume series of collections of Lovecraft's letters and includes a preface by August Derleth and Donald Wandrei.

== Contents ==
Selected Letters III (1929-1931) includes letters to:

- Frank Belknap Long
- Woodburn Harris
- James Ferdinand Morton, Jr.
- Elizabeth Toldridge
- August Derleth
- Robert E. Howard

== Reprints ==
- 2nd printing of 2,531 copies, 1997.
