= Nassau Hall =

Historic place in New Jersey, United States

- Nassau Hall, Princeton University
- U.S. National Register of Historic Places
- U.S. National Historic Landmark
- U.S. Historic district – Contributing property
- New Jersey Register of Historic Places
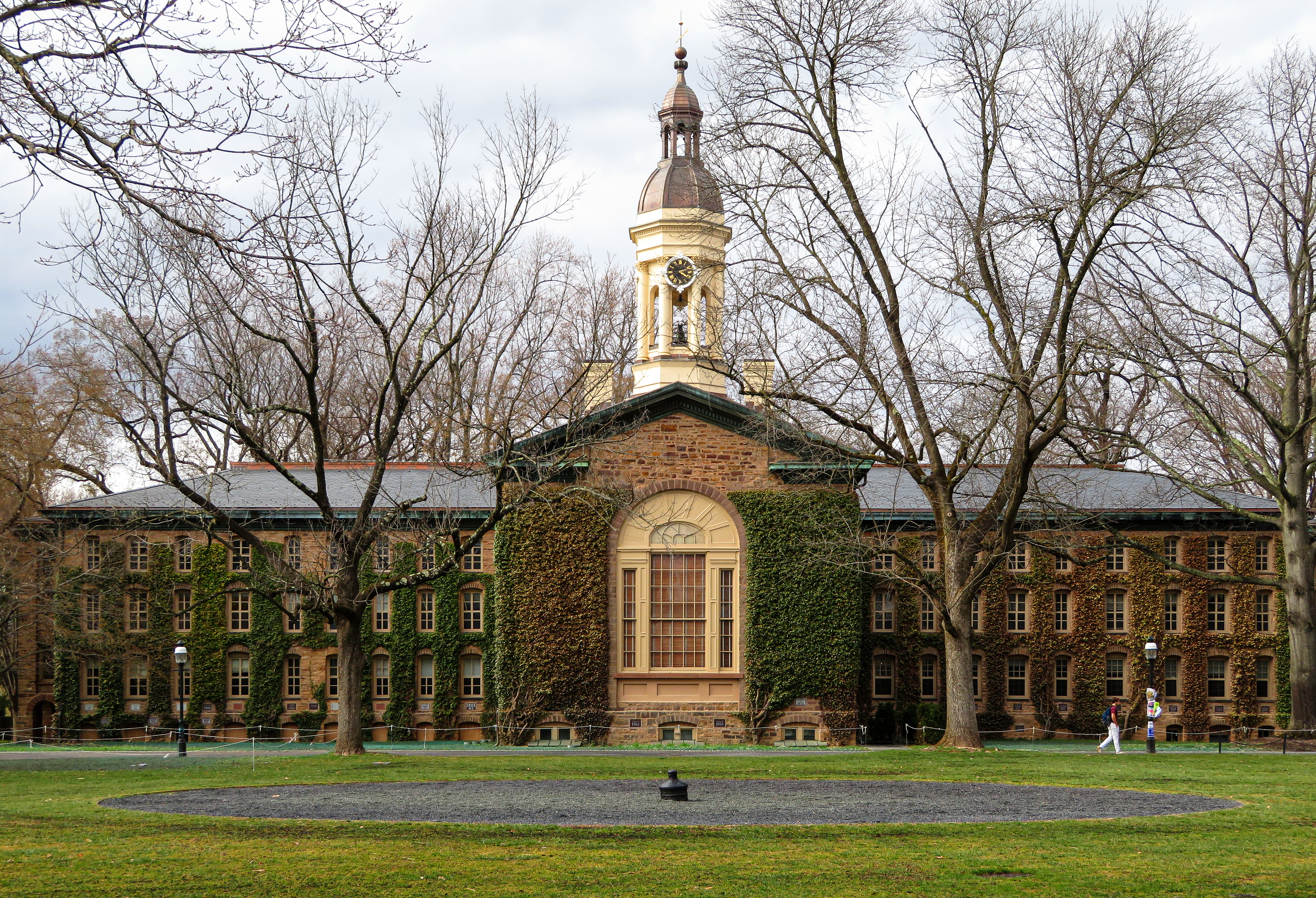

- Location within Mercer County, New Jersey Location within New Jersey Location within the United States
- Location: Princeton, New Jersey
- Coordinates: 40°20′55.46″N 74°39′33.66″W
- Built: 1756
- Architect: Robert Smith (1756), Benjamin Latrobe (1804), John Notman (1855)
- Architectural style: Renaissance
- Part of: Princeton Historic District (ID75001143)
- NRHP reference No.: 66000465
- NJRHP No.: 1739

Significant dates
- Added to NRHP: October 15, 1966
- Designated NHL: October 9, 1960
- Designated NJRHP: May 27, 1971

Nassau Hall, colloquially known as Old Nassau, is the oldest building at Princeton University in Princeton, New Jersey, United States. In 1783 it served as the United States Capitol building for four months. At the time it was built in 1756, Nassau Hall was the largest building in colonial New Jersey and the largest academic building in the American colonies.

The university, originally known as the College of New Jersey, held classes for one year in Elizabeth and nine years in Newark before the hall was completed in 1756. Designed originally by Robert Smith, the building was subsequently remodeled by notable American architects Benjamin Latrobe, after the 1802 fire, and John Notman, after the 1855 fire. In the early years of Princeton University, Nassau Hall accommodated classrooms, a library, a chapel, and residential space for students and faculty. It housed the university's first Department of Psychology.

During the American Revolutionary War, Nassau Hall was possessed by both British and American forces and suffered considerable damage, especially during the Battle of Princeton on January 3, 1777. From June 30 to November 4, 1783, Princeton was the provisional capital of the United States, and Nassau Hall served as its seat of government. The Congress of the Confederation met in the building's library on the second floor. According to Princeton University, "Here Congress congratulated George Washington on his successful termination of the war, received the news of the signing of the definitive treaty of peace with Great Britain, and welcomed the first foreign minister—from the Netherlands—accredited to the United States."

At present, Nassau Hall houses Princeton University's administrative offices, including that of the university's president. Old Nassau refers affectionately to the building and serves as a metonym for the university as a whole. The U.S. Department of the Interior designated Nassau Hall a National Historic Landmark in 1960, "signifying its importance in the Revolutionary War and in the history of the United States."

== Name ==
When the building was constructed in 1754, the college's board wanted to name it after Jonathan Belcher, the royal governor of New Jersey, but he declined, preferring it to be dedicated "to the immortal memory of the glorious King William III," who hailed from the Dutch House of Orange-Nassau. As a result, the building is known as Nassau Hall.

== History ==
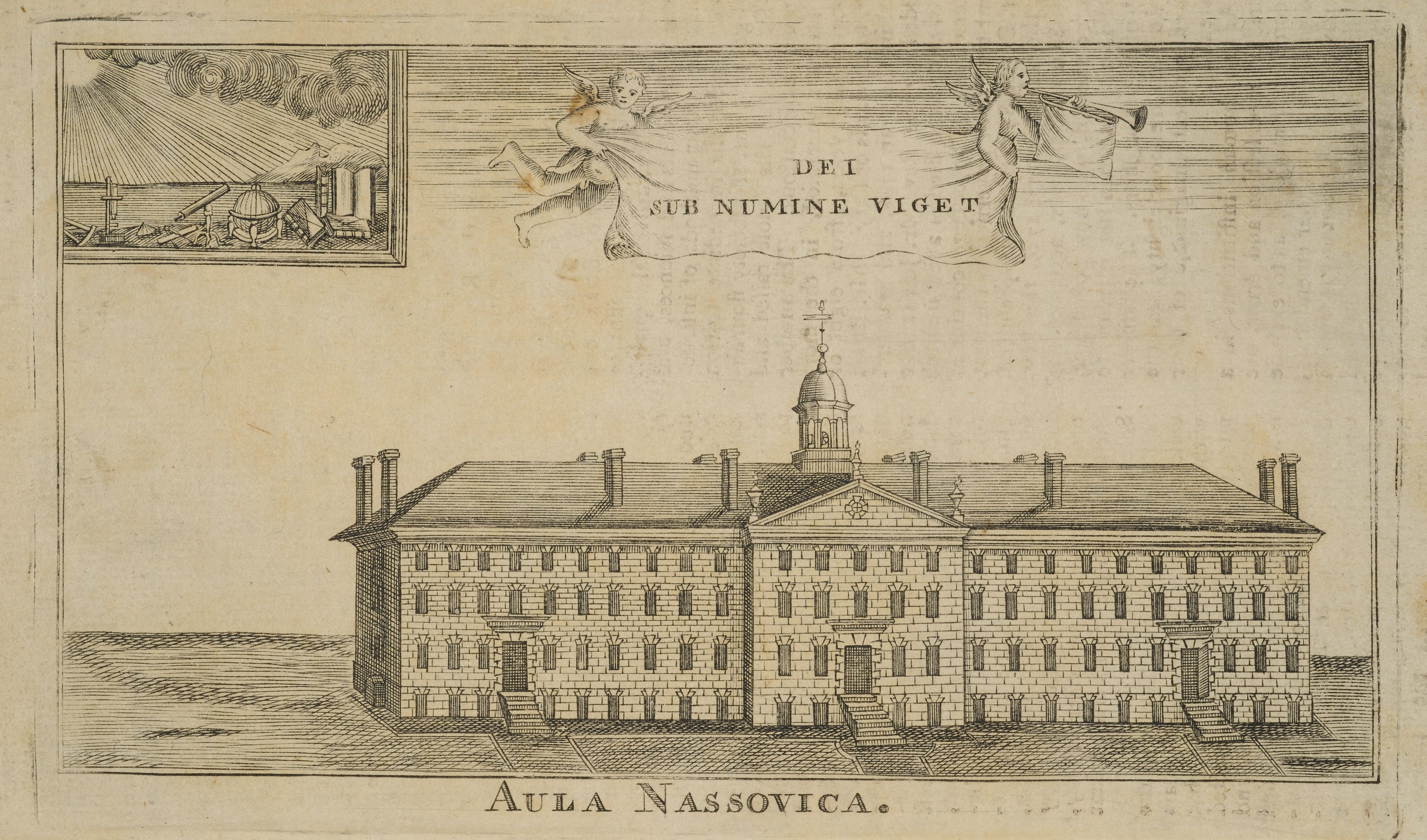
A 1760 engraving of Nassau Hall.

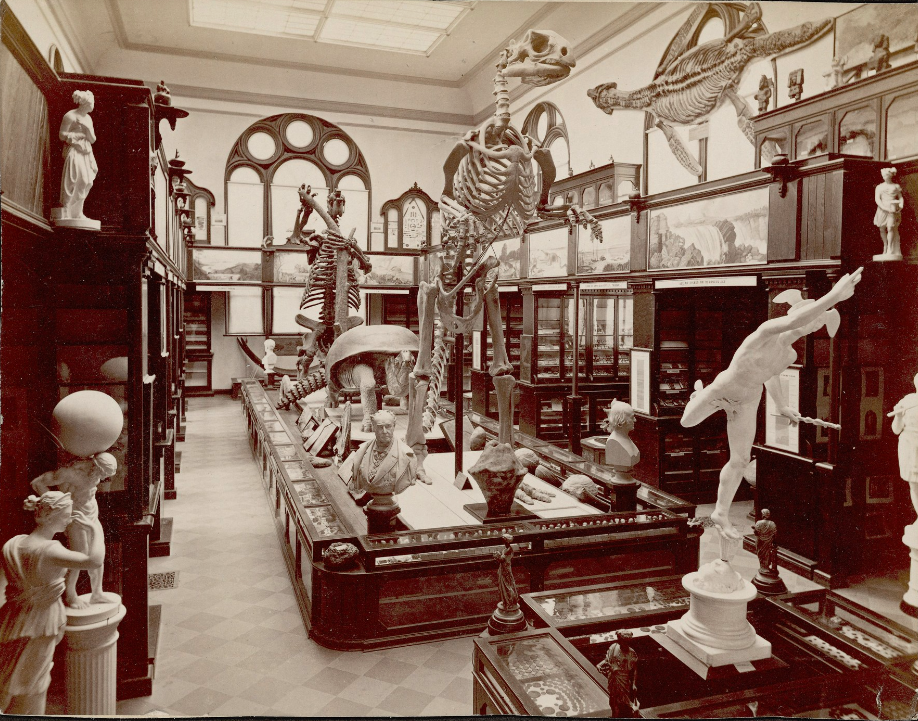
The Faculty Room in 1886, when it served as home to the art and natural history collections

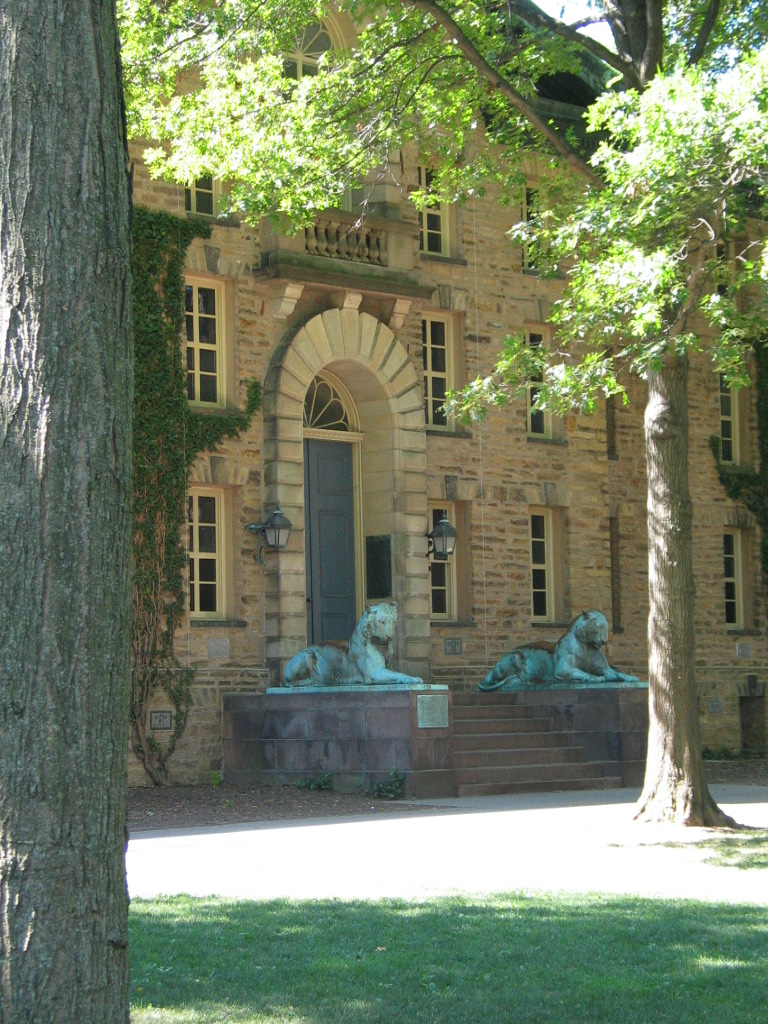
Nassau Hall entrance

The New Jersey Legislature met for the first time in Nassau Hall on August 27, 1776. British forces occupied Nassau Hall in 1776, and the Continental Army attacked the building during the Battle of Princeton on January 3, 1777. Three cannonballs were fired at the building, but only two made contact. One bounced off the south side of the building; the damage can still be seen today. Another cannonball reportedly flew through a window in the faculty room and "decapitated" a portrait of George II of Great Britain. The cannonball was said to have come from a gun in the artillery company commanded by Alexander Hamilton, who had been rejected by Princeton when he first came to the colonies. The result of the battle was a decisive Patriot victory, and Nassau Hall was retaken by the Americans.

The Congress of the Confederation convened in Nassau Hall for a little more than four months (from June 30, 1783, to November 4, 1783). The normal location in Philadelphia, Pennsylvania had to be vacated because of a mutiny by Continental Army soldiers. Starting in 1869, each graduation class adds a new sprig of ivy to grow up the walls of the building. The first U.S. commemorative postage stamp printed on colored paper honored Nassau Hall on its bicentennial. It depicted a front view of Nassau Hall. It was denominated at the first class rate of 3 cents and was on orange paper. It was first issued at Princeton, New Jersey, on September 22, 1956.

== Princeton's alma mater ==
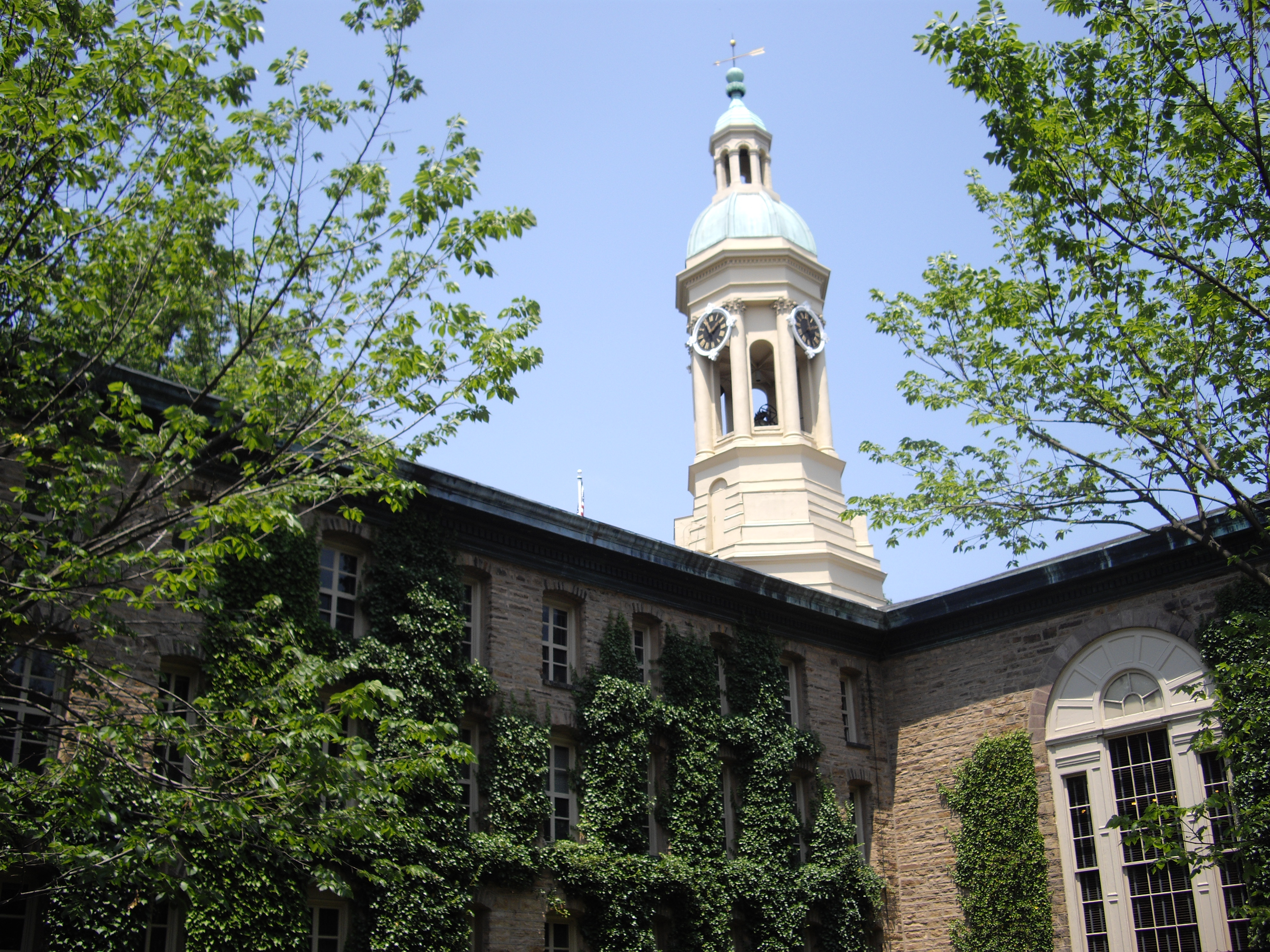
Side view

The song Old Nassau was adopted as Princeton University's alma mater (school song) in 1859. The lyrics were written by Harlan Page Peck, a member of Princeton's class of 1862, and first published in the March 1859 issue of Nassau Literary Magazine. The music, originally to be set to the tune of Auld Lang Syne, proved unworkable, and Karl A. Langlotz, a professor of music at Princeton who had studied composition under Franz Liszt, wrote a new melody for the song's lyrics.

== Architecture ==
As described in 1760 in the New American Magazine, "The simple interior design is shown in the plan, where a central corridor provided communication with the students' chambers and recitation rooms, the entrances, and the common prayer hall; and on the second floor, with the library over the central north entrance. The prayer hall was two stories high, measured 32 by 40 feet, and had a balcony at the north end which could be reached from the second-story entry. Partially below ground level, though dimly lighted by windows, was the cellar, which served as kitchen, dining area (beneath the prayer hall), and storeroom. In all there were probably forty rooms for the students, not including those added later in the cellar when a moat was dug to allow additional light and air into that dungeon."

On March 6, 1802, a fire devastated the interior of the hall, leaving only the exterior walls standing and destroying nearly all contents including 2,900 out of the library's 3,000 books. Benjamin Henry Latrobe, the first architect professionally trained in the United States and known for his work in the Federal style, oversaw the reconstruction and refused his share of the $42,000 that had been raised for the effort. "The horizontal lintels over the three entrances at the front of the building were replaced with triangular pediments, and the circular window in the central pediment rising from the eves (sic) was replaced with a fanlight."

The hall was gutted by fire once again in March 1855. Reconstruction was carried out by John Notman of Philadelphia in his characteristic Italian Renaissance style, adding an often-criticized cupola and towers along with engineering improvements. Many of his architectural flourishes were removed in later renovations.

== See also ==
- National Register of Historic Places listings in Mercer County, New Jersey
- List of the oldest buildings in New Jersey
- FitzRandolph Gate
