= Russian Revolution =

1917–1922 civil war in the Russian Empire

- Part of the opposition to World War I and the revolutions of 1917–1923
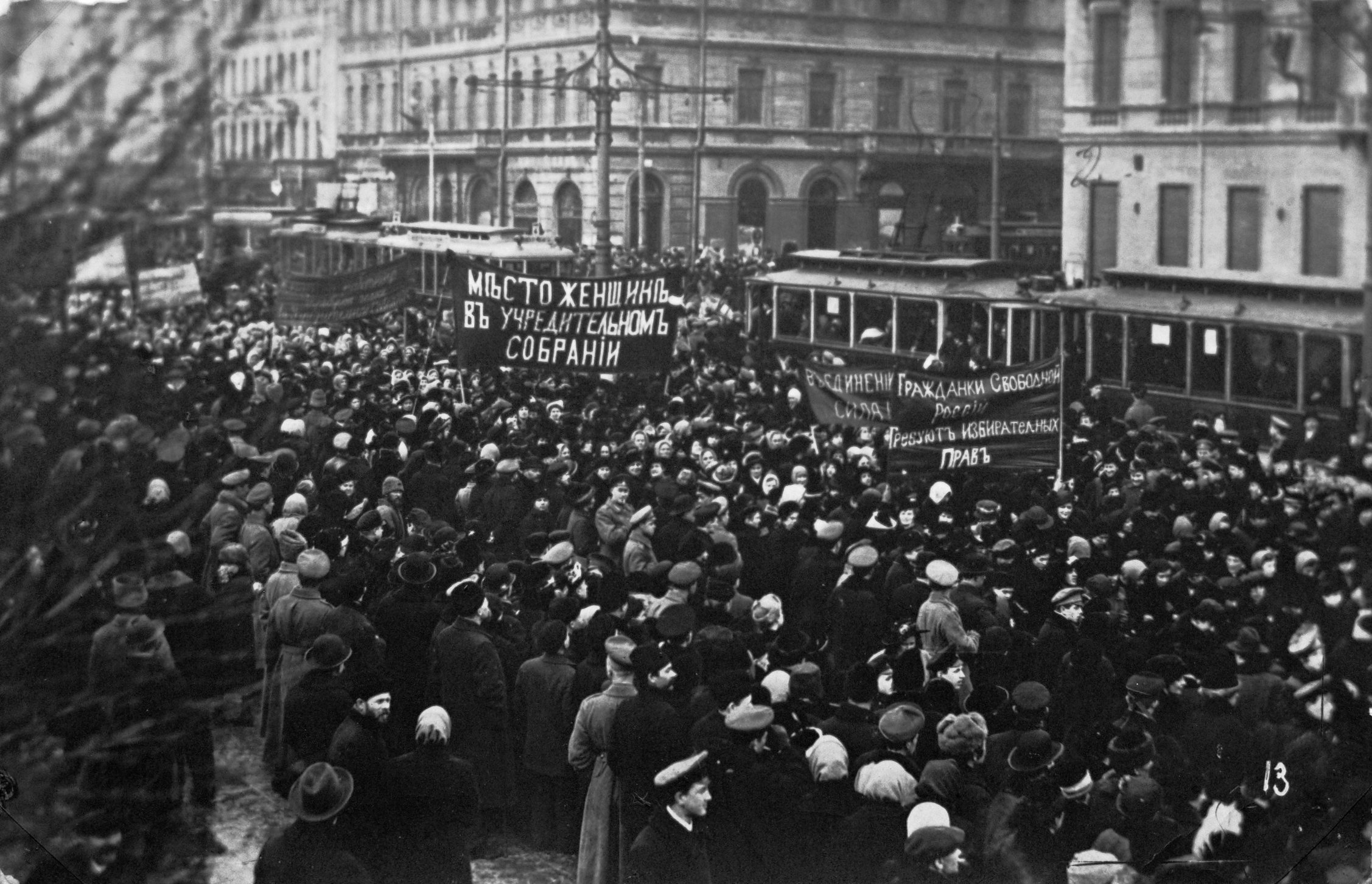
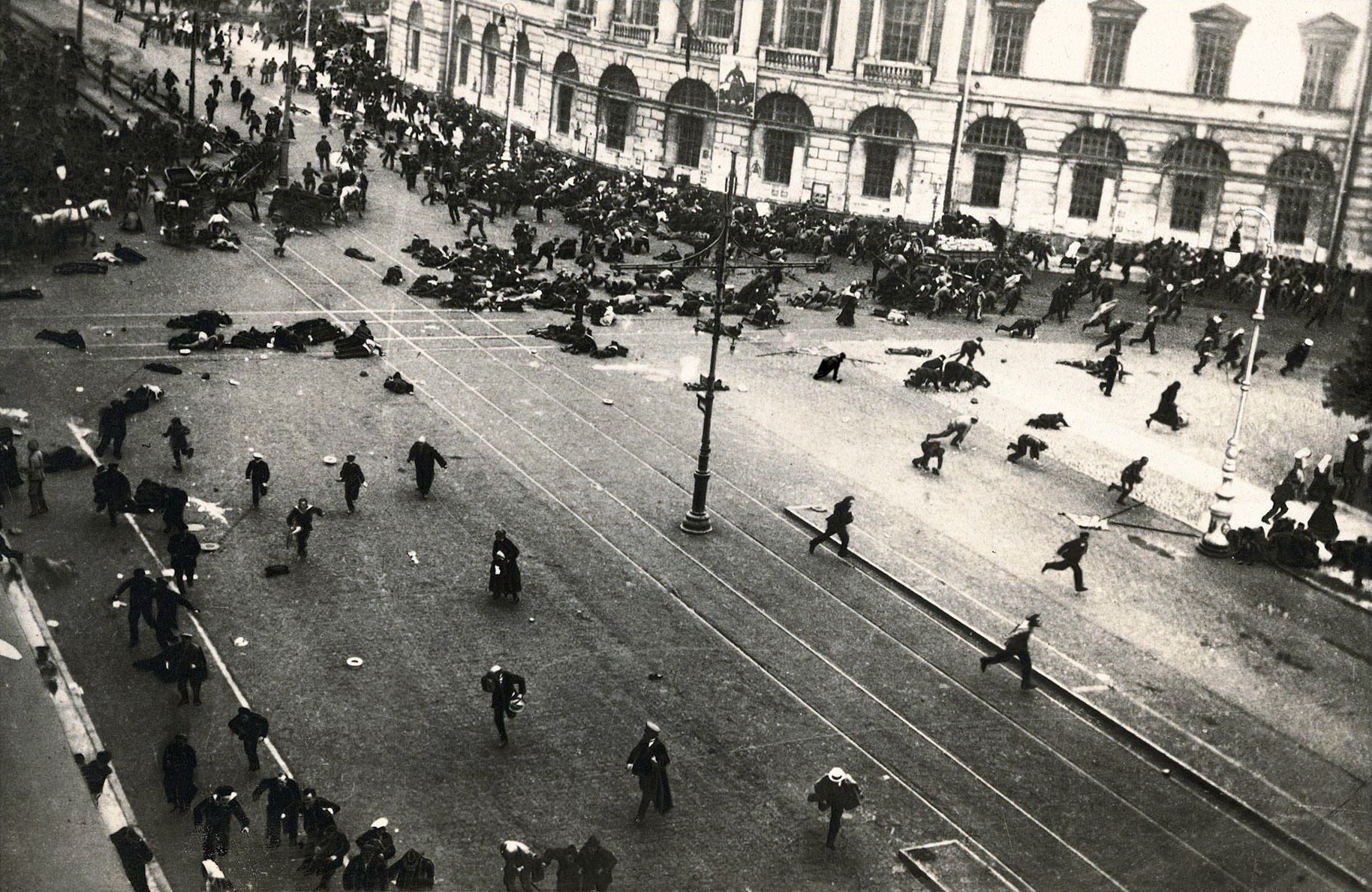
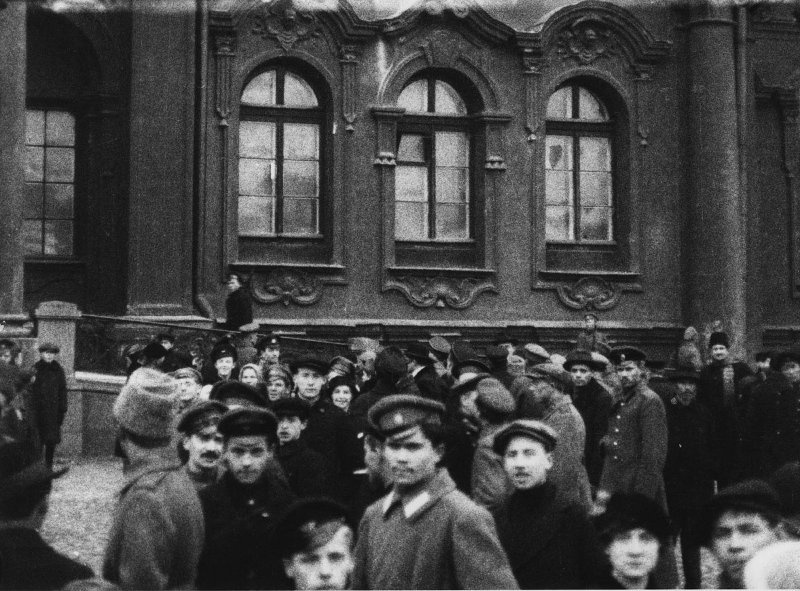
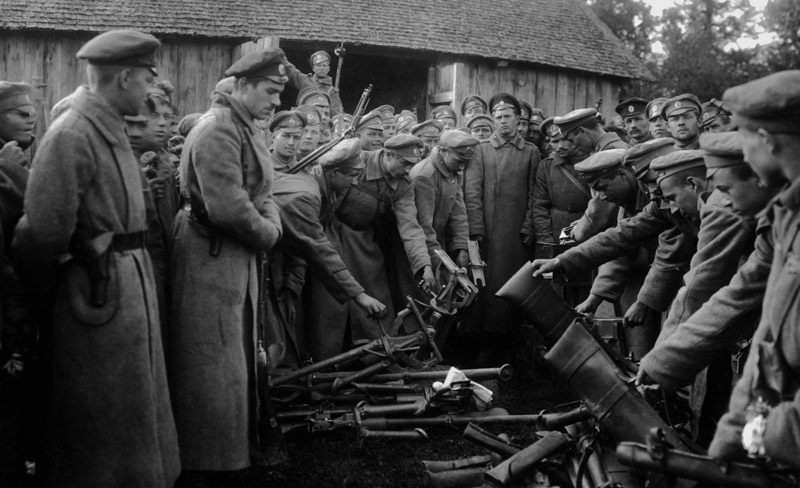
- Clockwise from top left: Protesters holding banners at Nevsky Prospect, February Revolution.; Crowd scattered by gunfire during the July Days in Petrograd.; Rebel troops lay down their weapons after the Kornilov affair.; The Winter Palace stormed, October Revolution.
- Native name: Революция 1917 года (romanisation: Revolyutsiya tysyacha devyat'sot semnadtsatogo goda)
- Date: 8 March 1917 – 25 October 1922 (5 years, 3 months and 8 days)
- Duration: February Revolution (8–16 March 1917); Dual power (16 March – 7 November 1917); October Revolution and Russian Civil War (7 November 1917 – 25 October 1922)
- Location: Russia
- Participants: SRs, Kadets, Bolsheviks, Mensheviks, Provisional Govt., army, nationalists (early); Red Army, White Armies, anarchists, Greens, Allies, Central Powers, separatists, Committee of Members of the Constituent Assembly (later)
- Outcome: End of the Russian monarchy; Dissolution of the Russian Empire; Failure of the short-lived Russian Republic and Russian State; End of Russia's involvement in the First World War; Establishment of Bolshevik Soviet republics in Russia proper, most of Ukraine, Belarus, Central Asia and the Southern Caucasus; Independence of Poland, Finland, Estonia, Latvia, and Lithuania; Establishment of the Soviet Union

The Russian Revolution was a period of political and social change in Russia starting in 1917. This period saw Russia abolish its monarchy and adopt a socialist form of government following two successive revolutions and a civil war. It can be seen as the precursor to other revolutions that occurred in the aftermath of World War I, such as the German Revolution of 1918–1919. The Russian Revolution was a key event of the 20th century.

The Russian Revolution began with the February Revolution in 1917, in the midst of World War I. With the German Empire inflicting defeats on the Eastern Front and increasing logistical problems causing shortages of bread and grain, the Russian Army was losing morale, with large-scale mutiny looming. Officials were convinced that if Tsar Nicholas II abdicated, the unrest would subside. Nicholas stepped down on 15 March [O.S. 2 March], ushering in a provisional government led by the Duma (parliament). During the unrest, locals in Petrograd (now Saint Petersburg) formed Soviet councils. These councils did not initially oppose the new government, but they insisted on having influence over it and control of the militias. By March, Russia had two rival governments. The Provisional Government held state power in military and international affairs, whereas the network of Soviets held domestic power. The working and urban middle classes provided critical support to the Soviets. There were mutinies, protests and strikes. Socialist and other leftist political organizations competed for influence within the Provisional Government and Soviets. Factions included the Mensheviks, Socialist Revolutionaries, Anarchists, and the Bolsheviks, a far-left party led by Vladimir Lenin.

The Bolsheviks won popularity with a program promising peace, land, and bread: an end to the war, land for the peasantry, and ending famine. After assuming power, the Provisional Government continued fighting the war in spite of public opposition. Taking advantage, the Bolsheviks and other factions gained popular support to advance the revolution. Responding to discontent in Petrograd, the Provisional Government repressed protestors, leading to the July Days. The Bolsheviks merged workers' militias loyal to them into the Red Guards. The volatile situation reached its climax with the October Revolution, an armed Bolshevik insurrection in Petrograd beginning 7 November [O.S. 25 October] that overthrew the Provisional Government. The Bolsheviks established their own government and proclaimed the establishment of the Russian Soviet Federative Socialist Republic (RSFSR). Under pressure from German military offensives, the Bolsheviks relocated the capital to Moscow. The RSFSR began reorganizing the empire into the world's first socialist state, practicing soviet democracy on a national and international scale. Their promise to end Russia's participation in World War I was fulfilled when Bolshevik leaders signed the Treaty of Brest-Litovsk with Germany in March 1918. The Bolsheviks also established the Cheka, a secret police and revolutionary security service working to uncover, punish, and eliminate those considered to be "enemies of the people" in a series of campaigns called the Red Terror.

Although the Bolsheviks held large support in urban areas, they had foreign and domestic enemies that refused to recognize their government. Russia erupted into a bloody civil war, which pitted the Reds (Bolsheviks) against an array of enemies, which included nationalist movements, anti-Bolshevik socialist parties, anarchists, monarchists and liberals; the latter two parties strongly supported the Russian White movement which was led mainly by right-leaning officers and seen as fighting for the restoration of the imperial order. The Bolshevik commissar Leon Trotsky began organizing workers' militias loyal to the Bolsheviks into the Red Army. While key events occurred in Moscow and Petrograd, every city in the empire was convulsed, including the provinces of national minorities, and in the rural areas peasants took over and redistributed land.

As the war progressed, the RSFSR established Soviet power in Armenia, Azerbaijan, Byelorussia, Georgia, and Ukraine. Wartime cohesion and intervention from foreign powers prompted the RSFSR to begin unifying these nations under one flag and created the Soviet Union. Historians consider the end of the revolutionary period to be in 1922, when the civil war concluded with the defeat of the White Army and separatist factions, leading to mass emigration from Russia. The victorious Bolshevik Party reconstituted itself into the All-Union Communist Party (Bolsheviks) and remained in power for six decades.

== Background ==
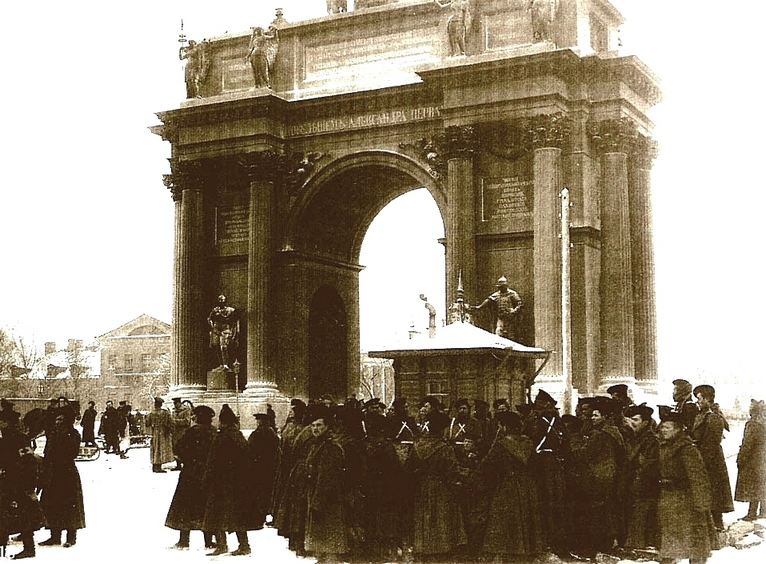
Soldiers blocking Narva Gate on Bloody Sunday

The Russian Revolution of 1905 was a major factor contributing to the cause of the Revolutions of 1917. The events of Bloody Sunday triggered nationwide protests and soldier mutinies. A council of workers called the St. Petersburg Soviet was created in this chaos. While the 1905 Revolution was ultimately crushed and the leaders of the St. Petersburg Soviet arrested, the 1905 Revolution laid the groundwork for the later Petrograd Soviet and other revolutionary movements during the leadup to 1917. The 1905 Revolution also led to the creation of a Duma (parliament) that would later form the Provisional Government after February 1917.

Russia's poor performance in the early years of World War I also prompted growing complaints directed at Tsar Nicholas II and the Romanov family. A short wave of patriotic nationalism ended in the face of defeats and poor conditions on the Eastern Front. The Tsar made the situation worse by taking personal control of the Imperial Russian Army in 1915, a challenge far beyond his skills. He was now held personally responsible for Russia's continuing defeats and losses. In addition, Tsarina Alexandra, left to rule while the Tsar commanded at the front, was German-born, leading to suspicions of collusion. These suspicions were exacerbated by rumors of her relationship with the controversial mystic Grigori Rasputin. Rasputin's influence led to disastrous ministerial appointments and corruption, resulting in a worsening of conditions within Russia.

After the Ottoman Empire's entry on the side of the Central Powers in October 1914, Russia was deprived of a major trade route to the Mediterranean Sea, which worsened the economic crisis and the munitions shortages. Meanwhile, Germany was able to produce great amounts of munitions while constantly fighting on two major battlefronts.

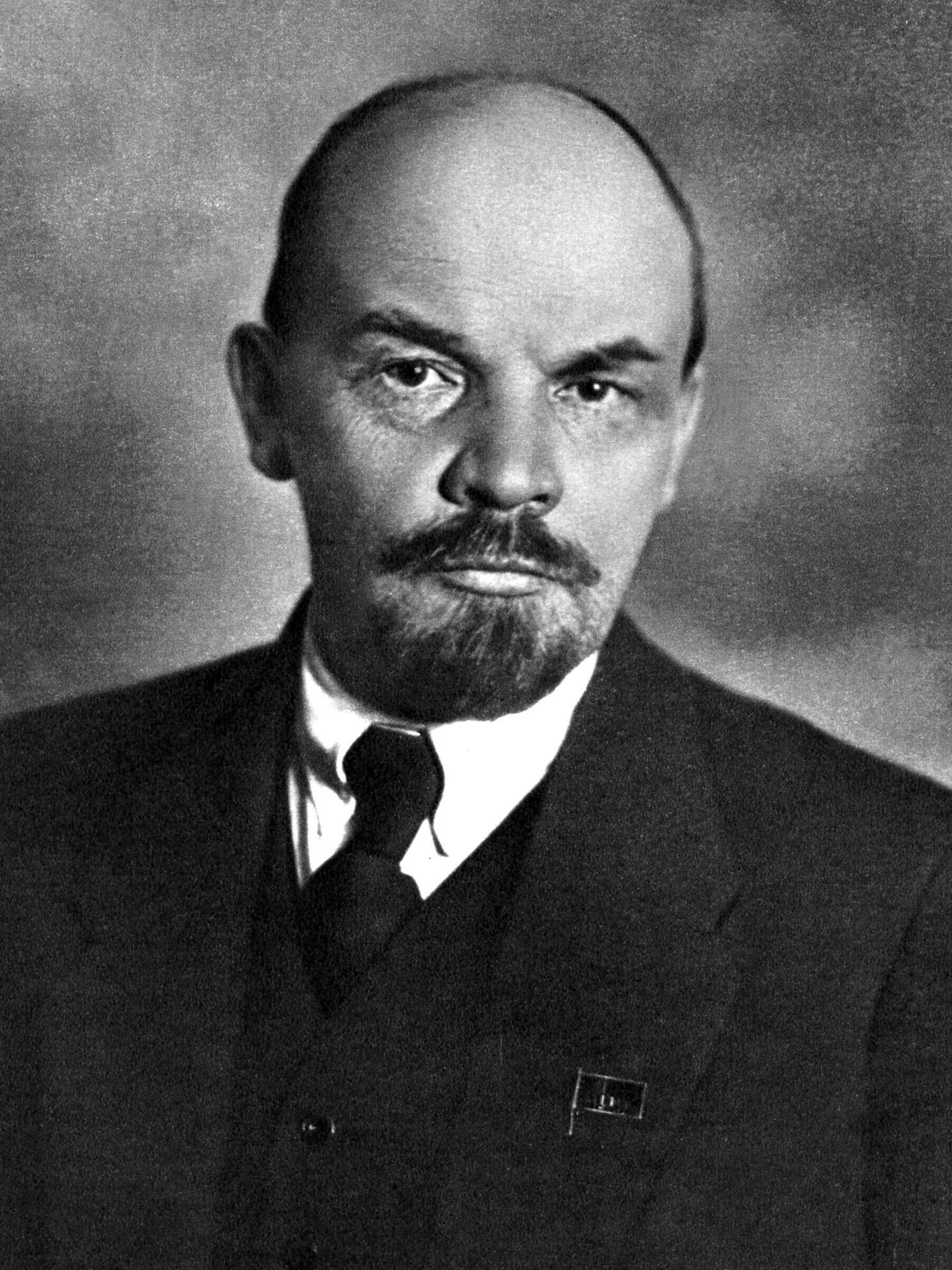
Vladimir Lenin, founder of the Soviet Union and leader of the Bolshevik party.

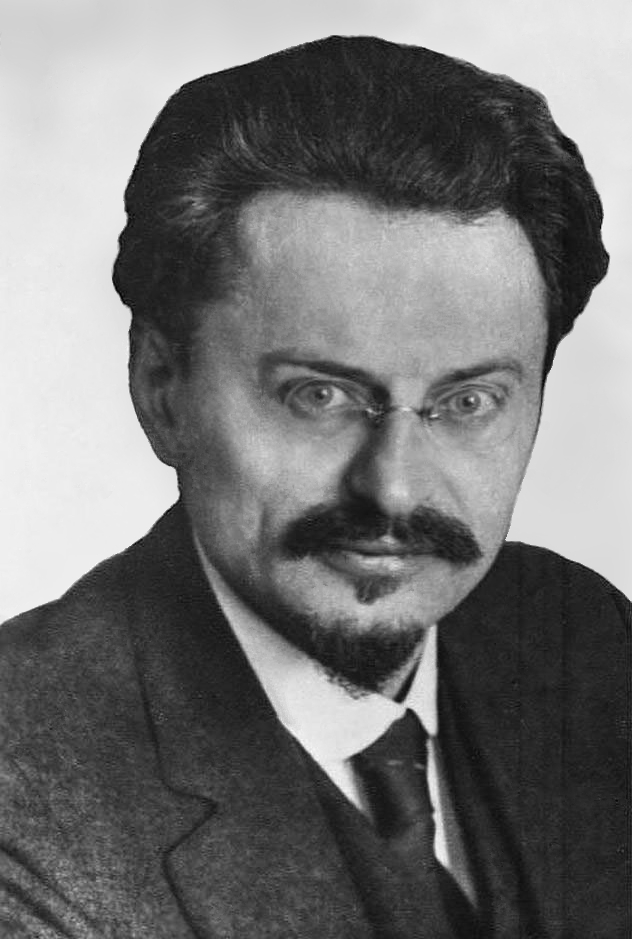
Leon Trotsky, founder of the Red Army and key figure in the October Revolution.

The conditions during the war resulted in a devastating loss of morale within the Russian army and the general population of Russia. This was particularly apparent in the cities, owing to a lack of food in response to the disruption of agriculture. Food scarcity had become a considerable problem in Russia, but the cause of this did not lie in any failure of the harvests, which had not been significantly affected by the war. The indirect reason was that the government, in order to finance the war, printed millions of roubles, and by 1917, inflation had made prices increase up to four times what they had been in 1914. Farmers were consequently faced with a higher cost of living but with little increase in income. As a result, they tended to hoard their grain and to revert to subsistence farming. Thus, the cities were constantly short of food. At the same time, rising prices led to demands for higher wages in the factories, and in January and February 1916, revolutionary propaganda, in part aided by German funds, led to widespread strikes. This resulted in growing criticism of the government, including an increased participation of workers in revolutionary parties.

Liberal parties too had an increased platform to voice their complaints, as the initial fervor of the war resulted in the Tsarist government creating a variety of political organizations. In July 1915, a Central War Industries Committee was established under the chairmanship of prominent Octobrist, Alexander Guchkov (1862–1936), which included ten workers' representatives. The Petrograd Mensheviks agreed to join despite the objections of their leaders abroad. All this activity gave renewed encouragement to political ambitions, and in September 1915, a combination of Octobrists and Kadets in the Duma demanded the forming of a responsible government, which the Tsar rejected.

All these factors gave rise to a sharp loss of confidence in the regime, even within the ruling class. This lack of confidence grew throughout the war. Early in 1916, Guchkov discussed the possibility of a coup to force the abdication of the Tsar with senior army officers and members of the Central War Industries Committee. In December, a small group of nobles assassinated Rasputin, and in January 1917, the Tsar's cousin, Grand Duke Nicholas, was asked indirectly by Prince Lvov whether he would be prepared to take over the throne from his nephew, Tsar Nicholas II. None of these incidents were in themselves the immediate cause of the February Revolution, but they do help to explain why the monarchy survived only a few days after it had broken out.

Meanwhile, Socialist Revolutionary leaders in exile, many of whom lived in Switzerland, had been the glum spectators of the collapse of international socialist solidarity. French and German Social Democrats had voted in favour of their respective governments' war efforts. Influential Russian Marxist Georgi Plekhanov in Paris had adopted a violently anti-German stand, and Marxist theorist Alexander Parvus supported the German war effort as the best means of ensuring a revolution in Russia. The Mensheviks largely maintained that Russia had the right to defend herself against Germany, although Julius Martov (a prominent Menshevik), now on the left of his group, demanded an end to the war and a settlement on the basis of national self-determination with no annexations or indemnities.

It was these views of Martov that predominated in a manifesto drawn up by Leon Trotsky (at the time a Menshevik) at a conference in Zimmerwald, attended by 35 Socialist leaders in September 1915. Vladimir Lenin, supported by Grigory Zinoviev and Karl Radek, strongly contested them. Lenin's faction became known as the Zimmerwald Left. Lenin rejected both the defence of Russia and the cry for peace. Since the autumn of 1914, he had insisted that "from the standpoint of the working class and of the labouring masses the lesser evil would be the defeat of the Tsarist Monarchy". He argued that the war must be turned into a civil war of the proletarian soldiers against their own governments, and if a proletarian victory should emerge from this in Russia, then their duty would be to wage a revolutionary war for the liberation of the masses throughout Europe.

=== Economic and social changes ===
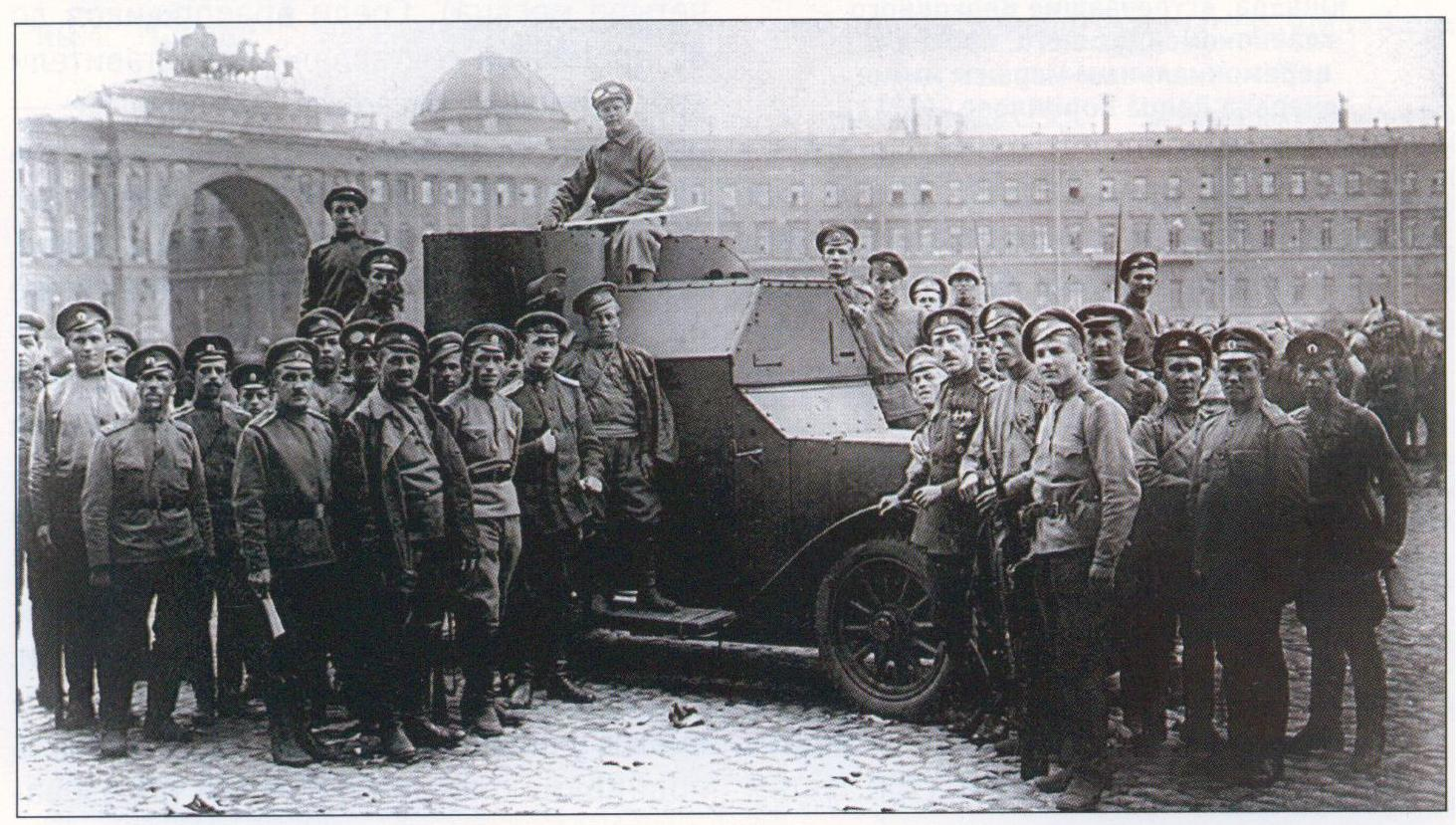
Provisional Government's volunteer soldiers secure Petrograd's Palace Square with the Austin Armoured Car, summer 1917.

An elementary theory of property, believed by many peasants, was that land should belong to those who work on it. At the same time, peasant life and culture was changing constantly. Change was facilitated by the physical movement of growing numbers of peasant villagers who migrated to and from industrial and urban environments, but also by the introduction of city culture into the village through material goods, the press, and word of mouth. (Note: For recent research on peasants, see Worobec, Christine (1955). Peasant Russia: Family and Community in the Post Emancipation Period. Princeton University Press.; Frank, Stephen P.; Steinberg, Mark D., eds. (1994). Cultures in Flux. Princeton University Press.; Engel, Barbara Alpern (1994). Between the Fields and the City: Women, Work, and Family in Russia, 1861–1914. Cambridge.; Burds, Jeffrey (1998). Peasant Dreams and Market Politics. Pittsburgh.; Frank, Stephen (1999). Crime, Cultural Conflict and Justice in Rural Russia, 1856–1914. University of California at Berkeley Press..)

Workers also had good reasons for discontent: overcrowded housing with often deplorable sanitary conditions, long hours at work (on the eve of the war, a 10-hour workday six days a week was the average and many were working 11–12 hours a day by 1916), constant risk of injury and death from poor safety and sanitary conditions, harsh discipline (not only rules and fines, but foremen's fists), and inadequate wages (made worse after 1914 by steep wartime increases in the cost of living). At the same time, urban industrial life had its benefits, though these could be just as dangerous (in terms of social and political stability) as the hardships. There were many encouragements to expect more from life. Acquiring new skills gave many workers a sense of self-respect and confidence, heightening expectations and desires. Living in cities, workers encountered material goods they had never seen in villages. Most importantly, workers living in cities were exposed to new ideas about the social and political order. (Note: For research on Russian workers, see especially Zelnik, Reginald (1971). Labor and Society in Tsarist Russia: The Factory Workers of St. Petersburg, 1855–1870. Stanford University Press.; Bonnell, Victoria (1983). Roots of Rebellion: Workers' Politics and Organizations in St. Petersburg and Moscow, 1900–1914. University of California at Berkeley Press.)

The social causes of the Russian Revolution can be derived from centuries of oppression of the lower classes by the Tsarist regime and Nicholas's failures in World War I. While rural agrarian peasants had been emancipated from serfdom in 1861, they still resented paying redemption payments to the state, and demanded communal tender of the land they worked. The problem was further compounded by the failure of Sergei Witte's land reforms of the early 20th century. Increasing peasant disturbances and sometimes actual revolts occurred, with the goal of securing ownership of the land they worked. Russia consisted mainly of poor farming peasants and substantial inequality of land ownership, with 1.5% of the population owning 25% of the land.

The rapid industrialization of Russia also resulted in urban overcrowding and poor conditions for urban industrial workers (as mentioned above). Between 1890 and 1910, the population of the capital, Saint Petersburg, nearly doubled from 1,033,600 to 1,905,600, with Moscow experiencing similar growth. This created a new 'proletariat' which, due to being crowded together in the cities, was much more likely to protest and go on strike than the peasantry had been in previous times. One 1904 survey found that an average of 16 people shared each apartment in Saint Petersburg, with six people per room. There was also no running water, and piles of human waste were a threat to the health of the workers. The poor conditions only aggravated the situation, with the number of strikes and incidents of public disorder rapidly increasing in the years shortly before World War I. Because of late industrialization, Russia's workers were highly concentrated. By 1914, 40% of Russian workers were employed in factories of 1,000+ workers (32% in 1901). 42% worked in 100–1,000 worker enterprises, 18% in 1–100 worker businesses (in the US, 1914, the figures were 18%, 47% and 35% respectively).

Years	Average annual strikes
1862–1869	6
1870–1884	20
1885–1894	33
1895–1905	176

World War I added to the chaos. Conscription across Russia resulted in unwilling citizens being sent off to war. The vast demand for factory production of war supplies and workers resulted in many more labor riots and strikes. Conscription stripped skilled workers from the cities, who had to be replaced with unskilled peasants. When famine began to hit due to the poor railway system, workers abandoned the cities in droves seeking food. Finally, the soldiers themselves, who suffered from a lack of equipment and protection from the elements, began to turn against the Tsar. This was mainly because, as the war progressed, many of the officers who were loyal to the Tsar were killed, being replaced by discontented conscripts from the major cities who had little loyalty to the Tsar.

=== Political issues ===
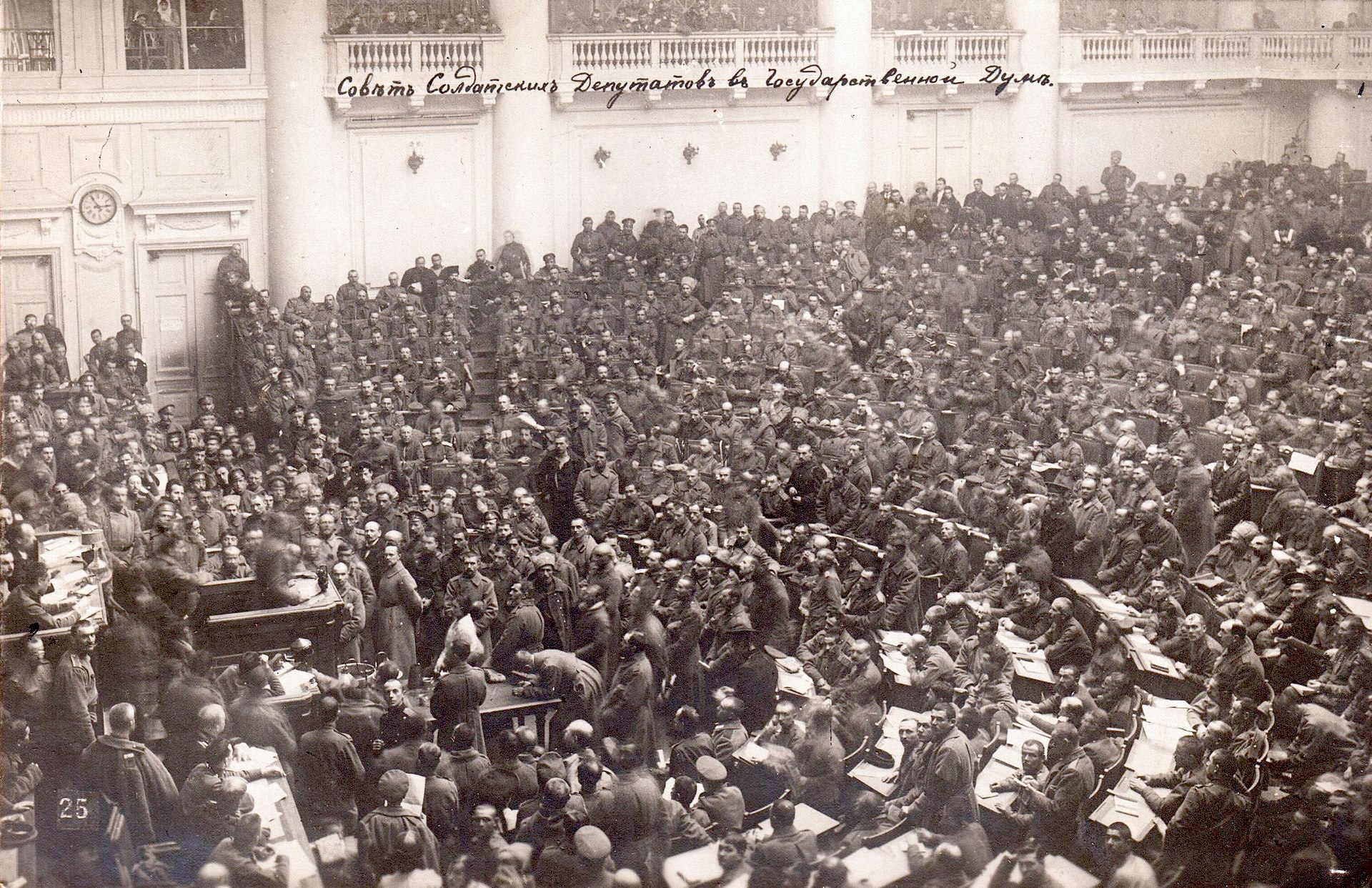
The Petrograd Soviet Assembly meeting in 1917

Many sections of the country had reason to be dissatisfied with the existing autocracy. Nicholas II was a deeply conservative ruler and maintained a strict authoritarian system. Individuals and society in general were expected to show self-restraint, devotion to community, deference to the social hierarchy and a sense of duty to the country. Religious faith helped bind all of these tenets together as a source of comfort and reassurance in the face of difficult conditions and as a means of political authority exercised through the clergy. Perhaps more than any other modern monarch, Nicholas II attached his fate and the future of his dynasty to the notion of the ruler as a saintly and infallible father to his people. (Note: See, especially, Lieven, Dominic (1993). Nicholas II: Emperor of all the Russias. London.; Verner, Andrew (1990). The Crisis of the Russian Autocracy: Nicholas II and the 1905 Revolution. Princeton University Press.; Steinberg, Mark; Khrustalev, Vladimir (1995). The Fall of the Romanovs: Political Dreams and Personal Struggles in a Time of Revolution. New Haven: Yale University Press.; Wortman, Richard (2000). Scenarios of Power. Vol. 2. Princeton University Press.)

This vision of the Romanov monarchy left him unaware of the state of his country. With a firm belief that his power to rule was granted by Divine Right, Nicholas assumed that the Russian people were devoted to him with unquestioning loyalty. This ironclad belief rendered Nicholas unwilling to allow the progressive reforms that might have alleviated the suffering of the Russian people. Even after the 1905 Revolution spurred the Tsar to decree limited civil rights and democratic representation, he worked to limit even these liberties in order to preserve the ultimate authority of the crown.

Despite constant oppression, the desire of the people for democratic participation in government decisions was strong. Since the Age of Enlightenment, Russian intellectuals had promoted Enlightenment ideals such as the dignity of the individual and the rectitude of democratic representation. These ideals were championed most vociferously by Russia's liberals, although populists, Marxists, and anarchists also claimed to support democratic reforms. A growing opposition movement had begun to challenge the Romanov monarchy openly well before the turmoil of World War I.

Dissatisfaction with Russian autocracy culminated in the huge national upheaval that followed the Bloody Sunday massacre of January 1905, in which hundreds of unarmed protesters were shot by the Tsar's troops. Workers responded to the massacre with a crippling general strike, forcing Nicholas to put forth the October Manifesto, which established a democratically elected parliament (the State Duma). Although the Tsar accepted the 1906 Fundamental State Laws one year later, he subsequently dismissed the first two Dumas when they proved uncooperative. Unfulfilled hopes of democracy fueled revolutionary ideas and violent outbursts targeted at the monarchy.

One of the Tsar's principal rationales for risking war in 1914 was his desire to restore the prestige that Russia had lost amid the debacles of the Russo-Japanese War (1904–1905). Nicholas also sought to foster a greater sense of national unity with a war against a common and old enemy. The Russian Empire was an agglomeration of diverse ethnicities that had demonstrated significant signs of disunity in the years before the First World War. Nicholas believed in part that the shared peril and tribulation of a foreign war would mitigate the social unrest over the persistent issues of poverty, inequality, and inhumane working conditions. Instead of restoring Russia's international political and military standing, World War I led to the slaughter of Russian troops and military defeats that undermined both the monarchy and Russian society to the point of collapse.

=== World War I ===
The outbreak of war in August 1914 initially served to quiet the prevalent social and political protests, focusing hostilities against a common external enemy, but this patriotic unity did not last long. As the war dragged on inconclusively, war-weariness gradually took its toll. Although many ordinary Russians joined anti-German demonstrations in the first few weeks of the war, hostility toward the Kaiser and the desire to defend their land and their lives did not necessarily translate into enthusiasm for the Tsar or the government.

Russia's first major battle of the war was a disaster; in the 1914 Battle of Tannenberg, over 30,000 Russian troops were killed or wounded and 90,000 captured, while Germany suffered just 12,000 casualties. However, Austro-Hungarian forces allied to Germany were driven back deep into the Galicia region by the end of the year. In the autumn of 1915, Nicholas had taken direct command of the army, personally overseeing Russia's main theatre of war and leaving his ambitious but incapable wife Alexandra in charge of the government. Reports of corruption and incompetence in the Imperial government began to emerge, and the growing influence of Grigori Rasputin in the Imperial family was widely resented.

In 1915, things took a critical turn for the worse when Germany shifted its focus of attack to the Eastern Front. The superior German Army – better led, better trained, and better supplied – was quite effective against the ill-equipped Russian forces, driving the Russians out of Galicia, as well as Russian Poland during the Gorlice–Tarnów Offensive campaign. By the end of October 1916, Russia had lost between 1,600,000 and 1,800,000 soldiers, with an additional 2,000,000 prisoners of war and 1,000,000 missing, all making up a total of nearly 5,000,000 men.

These staggering losses played a definite role in the mutinies and revolts that began to occur. In 1916, reports of fraternizing with the enemy began to circulate. Soldiers went hungry, lacked shoes, munitions, and even weapons. Rampant discontent lowered morale, which was further undermined by a series of military defeats.

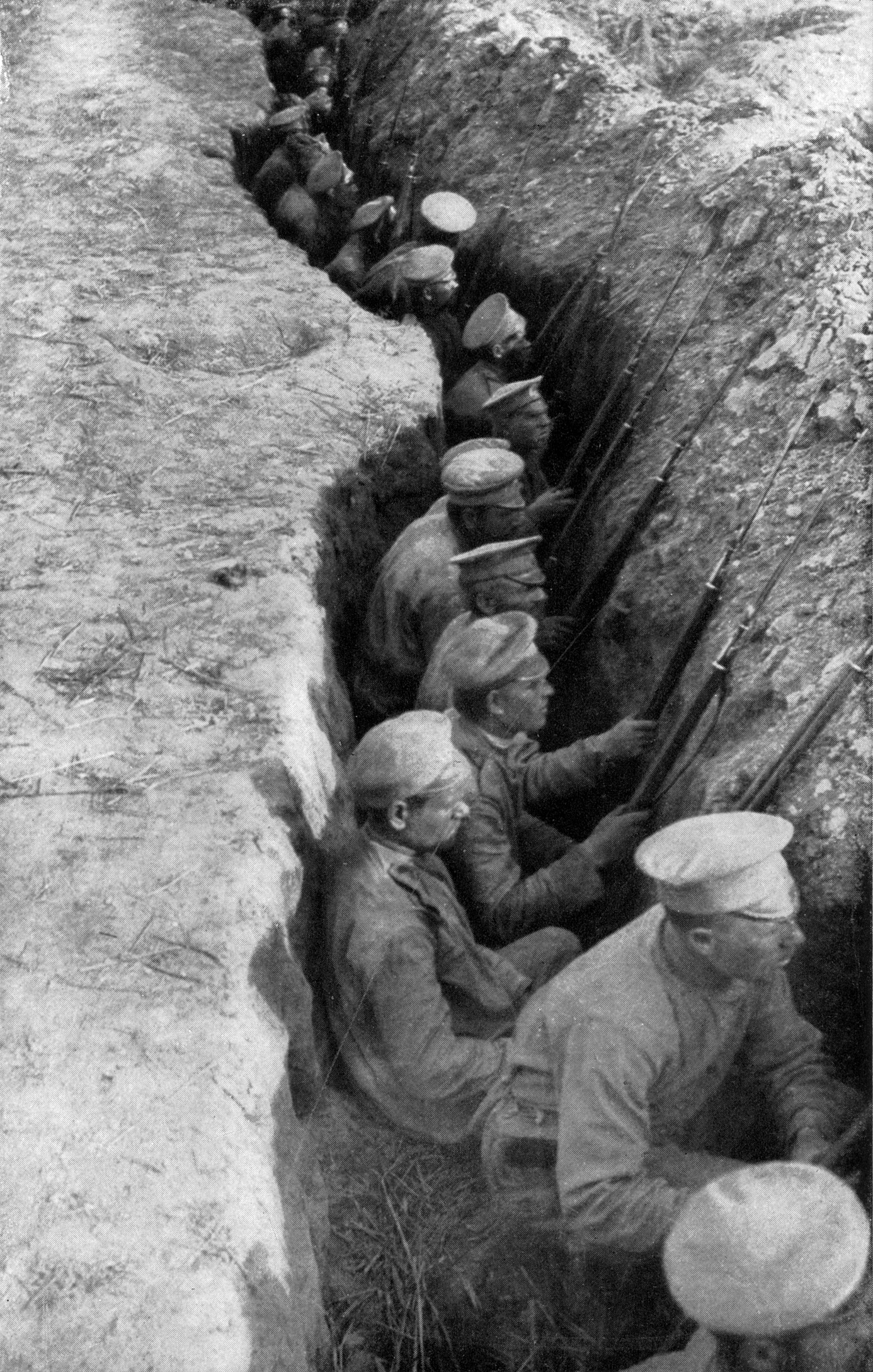
Russian troops in trenches awaiting a German attack

Casualty rates were the most vivid sign of this disaster. By the end of 1914, only five months into the war, around 390,000 Russian men had lost their lives and nearly 1,000,000 were injured. Far sooner than expected, inadequately trained recruits were called for active duty, a process repeated throughout the war as staggering losses continued to mount. The officer class also saw remarkable changes, especially within the lower echelons, which were quickly filled with soldiers rising up through the ranks. These men, usually of peasant or working-class backgrounds, were to play a large role in the politicization of the troops in 1917.

The army quickly ran short of rifles and ammunition (as well as uniforms and food), and by mid-1915, men were being sent to the front bearing no arms. It was hoped that they could equip themselves with arms recovered from fallen soldiers, of both sides, on the battlefields. The soldiers did not feel as if they were valuable, rather they felt as if they were expendable.

By the spring of 1915, the army was in steady retreat, which was not always orderly; desertion, plundering, and chaotic flight were not uncommon. By 1916, however, the situation had improved in many respects. Russian troops stopped retreating, and there were even some modest successes in the offensives that were staged that year, albeit at great loss of life. Also, the problem of shortages was largely solved by a major effort to increase domestic production. Nevertheless, by the end of 1916, morale among soldiers was even worse than it had been during the great retreat of 1915. The fortunes of war may have improved, but the fact of war remained which continually took Russian lives. The crisis in morale (as was argued by Allan Wildman, a leading historian of the Russian army in war and revolution) "was rooted fundamentally in the feeling of utter despair that the slaughter would ever end and that anything resembling victory could be achieved."

The war did not only devastate soldiers. By the end of 1915, there were manifold signs that the economy was breaking down under the heightened strain of wartime demand. The main problems were food shortages and rising prices. Inflation dragged incomes down at an alarmingly rapid rate, and shortages made it difficult for an individual to sustain oneself. These shortages were a problem especially in the capital, St. Petersburg, where distance from supplies and poor transportation networks made matters particularly worse. Shops closed early or entirely for lack of bread, sugar, meat, and other provisions, and lines lengthened massively for what remained. Conditions became increasingly difficult to afford food and physically obtain it.

Strikes increased steadily from the middle of 1915, and so did crime, but, for the most part, people suffered and endured, scouring the city for food. Working-class women in St. Petersburg reportedly spent about forty hours a week in food lines, begging, turning to prostitution or crime, tearing down wooden fences to keep stoves heated for warmth, and continued to resent the rich.

Government officials responsible for public order worried about how long people's patience would last. A report by the St. Petersburg branch of the security police, the Okhrana, in October 1916, warned bluntly of "the possibility in the near future of riots by the lower classes of the empire enraged by the burdens of daily existence."

Tsar Nicholas was blamed for all of these crises, and what little support he had left began to crumble. As discontent grew, the State Duma issued a warning to Nicholas in November 1916, stating that, inevitably, a terrible disaster would grip the country unless a constitutional form of government was put in place. Nicholas ignored these warnings and Russia's Tsarist regime collapsed a few months later during the February Revolution of 1917. One year later, the Tsar and his entire family were executed.

== February Revolution ==
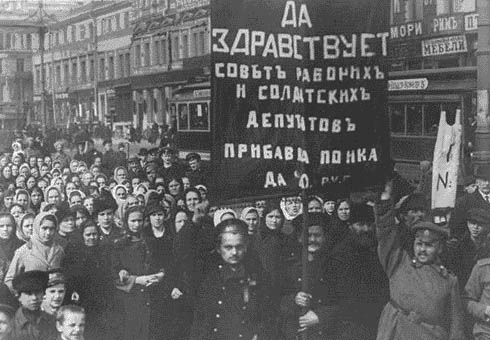
Revolutionaries protesting in February 1917

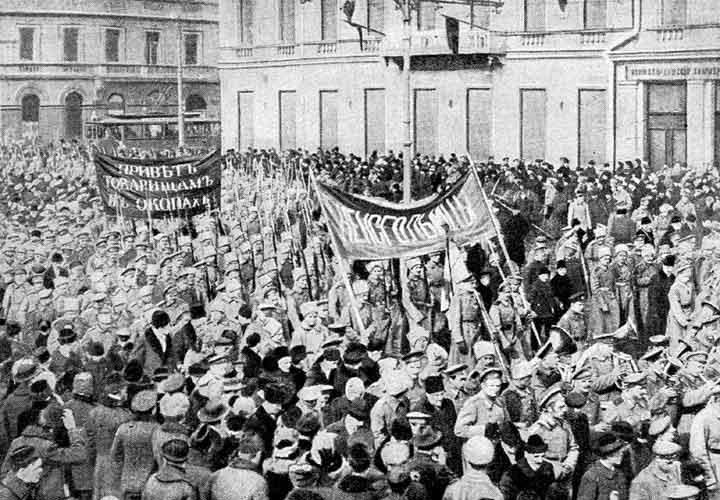
Soldiers marching in Petrograd, March 1917

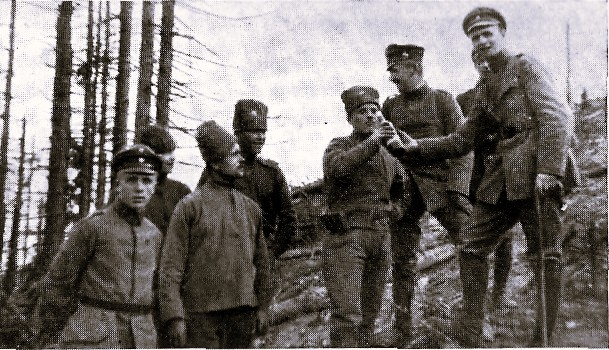
Russian troops meeting German troops in No Man's Land

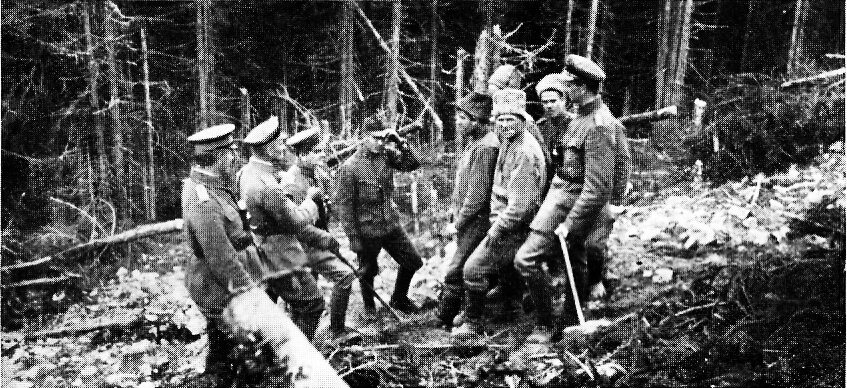
Meeting before the Russian wire entanglements

At the beginning of February, Petrograd workers began several strikes and demonstrations. On 7 March [O.S. 22 February], Putilov, Petrograd's largest industrial plant was closed by a workers' strike. The next day, a series of meetings and rallies were held for International Women's Day, which gradually turned into economic and political gatherings. Demonstrations were organised to demand bread, and these were supported by the industrial working force who considered them a reason for continuing the strikes. The women workers marched to nearby factories bringing out over 50,000 workers on strike. By 10 March [O.S. 25 February], virtually every industrial enterprise in Petrograd had been shut down, together with many commercial and service enterprises. Students, white-collar workers, and teachers joined the workers in the streets and at public meetings.

To quell the riots, the Tsar looked to the army. At least 180,000 troops were available in the capital, but most were either untrained or injured. Historian Ian Beckett suggests around 12,000 could be regarded as reliable, but even these proved reluctant to move in on the crowd, since it included so many women. It was for this reason that on 11 March [O.S. 26 February], when the Tsar ordered the army to suppress the rioting by force, troops began to revolt. Although few actively joined the rioting, many officers were either shot or went into hiding; the ability of the garrison to hold back the protests was all but nullified, symbols of the Tsarist regime were rapidly torn down around the city, and governmental authority in the capital collapsed – not helped by the fact that Nicholas had prorogued the Duma that morning, leaving it with no legal authority to act. The response of the Duma, urged on by the liberal bloc, was to establish a Temporary Committee to restore law and order; meanwhile, the socialist parties established the Petrograd Soviet to represent workers and soldiers. The remaining loyal units switched allegiance the next day.

The Tsar directed the royal train back towards Petrograd, which was stopped on 14 March [O.S. 1 March], by a group of revolutionaries at Malaya Vishera. When the Tsar finally arrived at Pskov, the Army Chief Nikolai Ruzsky, and the Duma deputies Alexander Guchkov and Vasily Shulgin suggested in unison that he abdicate the throne. He did so on 15 March [O.S. 2 March], on behalf of himself, and then, having taken advice on behalf of his son, the Tsarevich. Nicholas nominated his brother, the Grand Duke Michael Alexandrovich, to succeed him. But the Grand Duke realised that he would have little support as ruler, so he declined the crown on 16 March [O.S. 3 March], stating that he would take it only if that was the consensus of democratic action. Six days later, Nicholas, no longer Tsar and addressed with contempt by the sentries as "Nicholas Romanov", was reunited with his family at the Alexander Palace at Tsarskoye Selo. He was placed under house arrest with his family by the Provisional Government.

The immediate effect of the February Revolution was a widespread atmosphere of elation and excitement in Petrograd. On 16 March [O.S. 3 March], a provisional government was announced. The center-left was well represented, and the government was initially chaired by a liberal aristocrat, Prince Georgy Yevgenievich Lvov, a member of the Constitutional Democratic Party (KD). The socialists had formed their rival body, the Petrograd Soviet (or workers' council) four days earlier. The Petrograd Soviet and the Provisional Government competed for power over Russia.

== Dual power: Dvoyevlastiye ==
The effective power of the Provisional Government was challenged by the authority of an institution that claimed to represent the will of workers and soldiers and could, in fact, mobilize and control these groups during the early months of the revolution – the Petrograd Soviet Council of Workers' Deputies. The model for the Soviets were workers' councils that had been established in scores of Russian cities during the 1905 Revolution. In February 1917, striking workers elected deputies to represent them and socialist activists began organizing a citywide council to unite these deputies with representatives of the socialist parties. On 27 February, socialist Duma deputies, mainly Mensheviks and Socialist Revolutionaries, took the lead in organizing a citywide council. The Petrograd Soviet met in the Tauride Palace, room 13, permitted by the Provisional Government.

The leaders of the Petrograd Soviet believed that they represented particular classes of the population, not the whole nation. They also believed Russia was not ready for socialism. They viewed their role as limited to pressuring hesitant "bourgeoisie" to rule and to introduce extensive democratic reforms in Russia (the replacement of the monarchy by a republic, guaranteed civil rights, a democratic police and army, abolition of religious and ethnic discrimination, preparation of elections to a constituent assembly, and so on). They met in the same building as the emerging Provisional Government not to compete with the Duma Committee for state power, but to best exert pressure on the new government, to act, in other words, as a popular democratic lobby.

The relationship between these two major powers was complex from the beginning and would shape the politics of 1917. The representatives of the Provisional Government agreed to "take into account the opinions of the Soviet of Workers' Deputies", though they were also determined to prevent interference which would create an unacceptable situation of dual power. In fact, this was precisely what was being created, though this "dual power" (dvoyevlastiye) was the result less of the actions or attitudes of the leaders of these two institutions than of actions outside their control, especially the ongoing social movement taking place on the streets of Russia's cities, factories, shops, barracks, villages, and in the trenches.

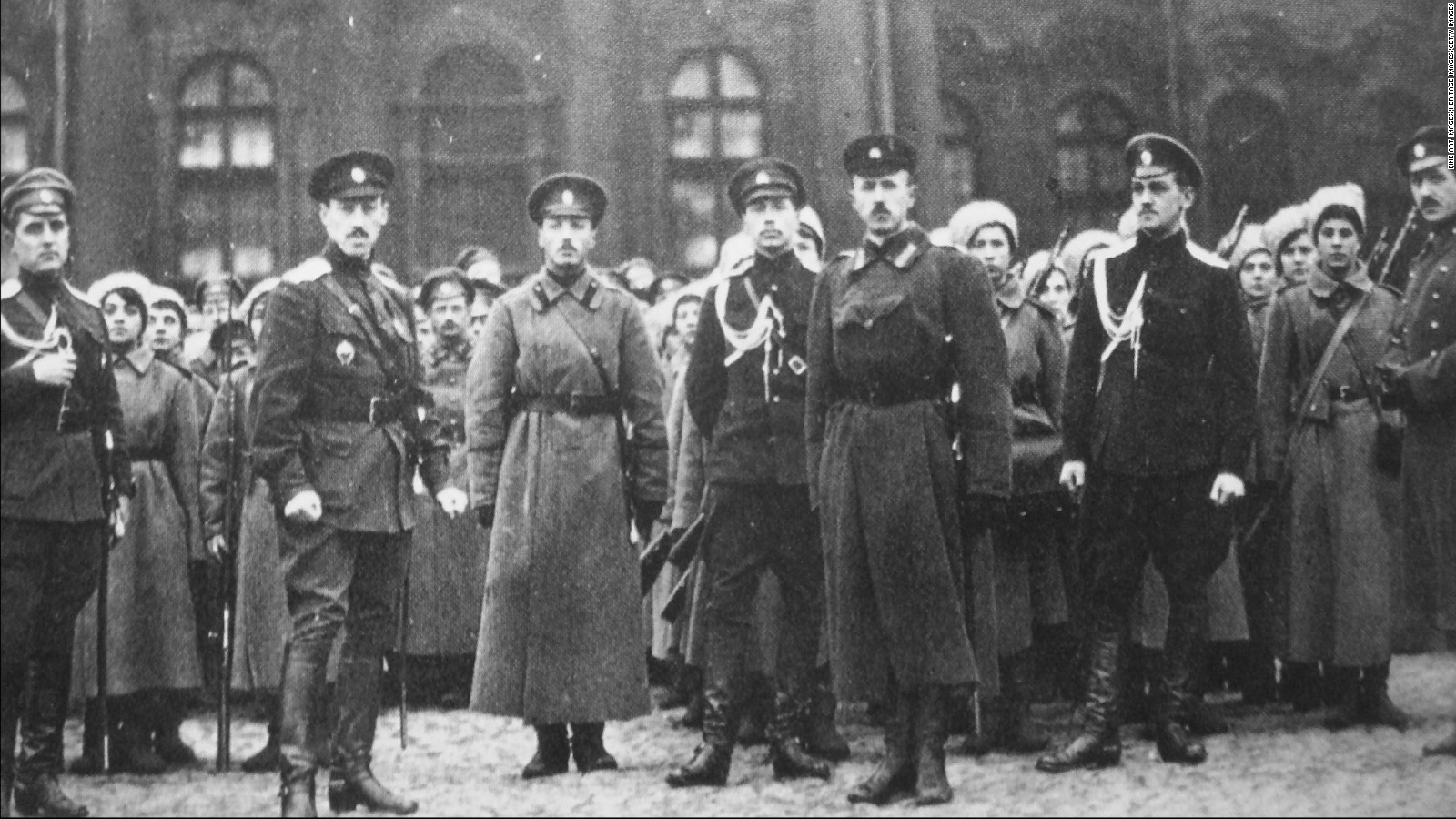
The 2nd Moscow Women Death Battalion protecting the Winter Palace as the last guards of the stronghold

A series of political crises took place in the relationship between the Provisional Government and the Soviets (which developed into a nationwide movement with a national leadership). The All-Russian Central Executive Committee of Soviets (VTsIK) undermined the authority of the Provisional Government but also of the moderate socialist leaders of the Soviets. Although the Soviet leadership initially refused to participate in the "bourgeois" Provisional Government, Alexander Kerensky, a young, popular lawyer and a member of the Socialist Revolutionary Party (SRP), agreed to join the new cabinet, and became an increasingly central figure in the government, eventually taking leadership of the Provisional Government. As minister of war and later Prime Minister, Kerensky promoted freedom of speech, released thousands of political prisoners, continued the war effort, even organizing another offensive (which, however, was no more successful than its predecessors). Nevertheless, Kerensky still faced several great challenges, highlighted by the soldiers, urban workers, and peasants, who claimed that they had gained nothing by the revolution:

- Other political groups were trying to undermine him.
- Heavy military losses were being suffered on the front.
- The soldiers were dissatisfied and demoralised and had started to defect. (On arrival back in Russia, these soldiers were either imprisoned or sent straight back into the front.)
- There was enormous discontent with Russia's involvement in the war, and many were calling for an end to it.
- There were great shortages of food and supplies, which was difficult to remedy because of the wartime economic conditions.

The political group that proved most troublesome for Kerensky, and would eventually overthrow him, was the Bolshevik Party, led by Vladimir Lenin. Lenin had been living in exile in neutral Switzerland and, due to democratization of politics after the February Revolution, which legalized formerly banned political parties, he perceived the opportunity for his Marxist revolution. Although return to Russia had become a possibility, the war made it logistically difficult. Eventually, German officials arranged for Lenin to pass through their territory, hoping that his activities would weaken Russia or even – if the Bolsheviks came to power – lead to Russia's withdrawal from the war. Lenin and his associates, however, had to agree to travel to Russia in a sealed train: Germany would not take the chance that he would foment revolution in Germany. After passing through the front, he arrived in Petrograd in April 1917.

On the way to Russia, Lenin prepared the April Theses, which outlined central Bolshevik policies. These included that the Soviets take power (as seen in the slogan "all power to the Soviets") and denouncing the liberals and social revolutionaries in the Provisional Government, forbidding co-operation with it. Many Bolsheviks, however, had supported the Provisional Government, including Lev Kamenev.

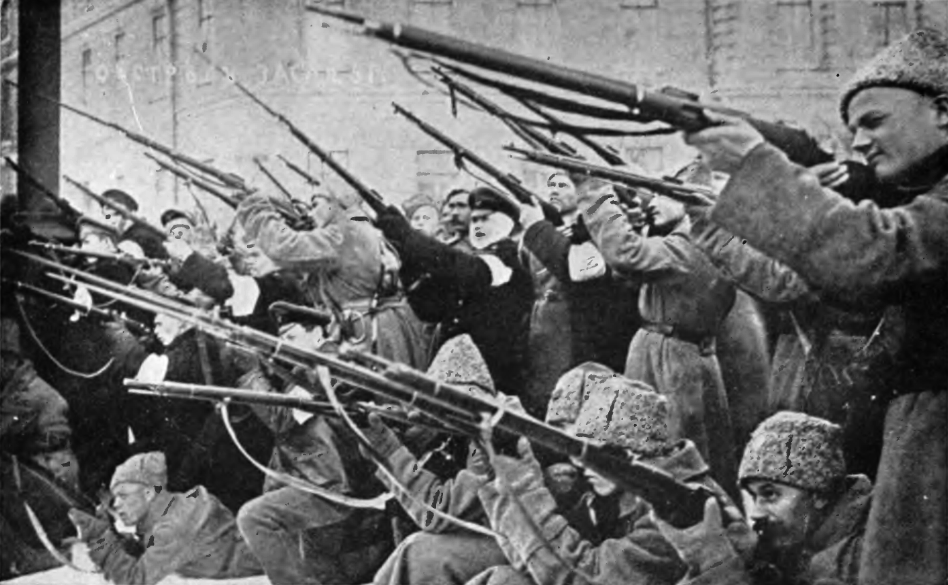
Revolutionaries attacking the tsarist police in the early days of the February Revolution

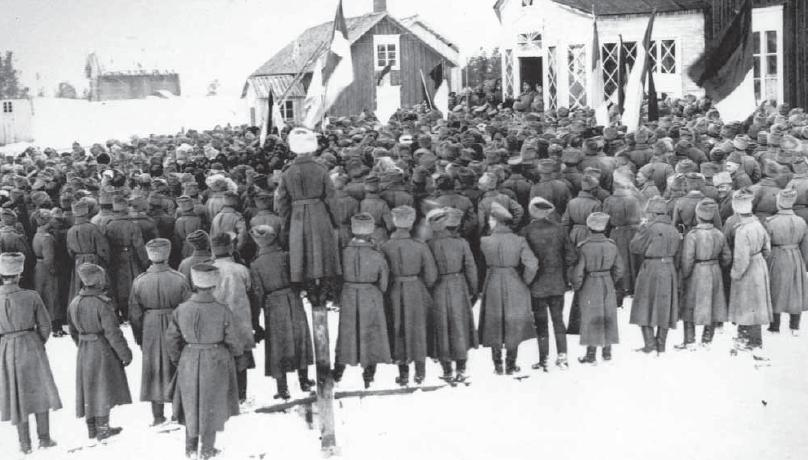
A revolutionary meeting of Russian soldiers in March 1917 in Dalkarby of Jomala, Åland

With Lenin's arrival, the popularity of the Bolsheviks increased steadily. Over the course of the spring, public dissatisfaction with the Provisional Government and the war, in particular among workers, soldiers and peasants, pushed these groups to radical parties. Despite growing support for the Bolsheviks, buoyed by maxims that called most famously for "all power to the Soviets", the party held very little real power in the moderate-dominated Petrograd Soviet. In fact, historians such as Sheila Fitzpatrick have asserted that Lenin's exhortations for the Soviet Council to take power were intended to arouse indignation both with the Provisional Government, whose policies were viewed as conservative, and the Soviets themselves, which were viewed as subservients to the conservative government. By some other historians' accounts, Lenin and his followers were unprepared for how their groundswell of support, especially among influential worker and soldier groups, would translate into real power in the summer of 1917.

On 18 June, the Provisional Government launched an attack against Germany that failed miserably. Soon after, the government ordered soldiers to go to the front, reneging on a promise. The soldiers refused to follow the new orders. The arrival of radical Kronstadt sailors – who had tried and executed many officers, including one admiral – further fueled the growing revolutionary atmosphere. Sailors and soldiers, along with Petrograd workers, took to the streets in violent protest, calling for "all power to the Soviets". The revolt, however, was disowned by Lenin and the Bolshevik leaders and dissipated within a few days. In the aftermath, Lenin fled to Finland under threat of arrest while Trotsky, among other prominent Bolsheviks, was arrested. The July Days confirmed the popularity of the anti-war, radical Bolsheviks, but their unpreparedness at the moment of revolt was an embarrassing gaffe that lost them support among their main constituent groups: soldiers and workers.

The Bolshevik failure in the July Days proved temporary. The Bolsheviks had undergone a spectacular growth in membership. Whereas, in February 1917, the Bolsheviks were limited to only 24,000 members, by September 1917 there were 200,000 members of the Bolshevik faction. Previously, the Bolsheviks had been in the minority in the two leading cities of Russia – St. Petersburg and Moscow behind the Mensheviks and the Socialist Revolutionaries, by September the Bolsheviks were in the majority in both cities. Furthermore, the Bolshevik-controlled Moscow Regional Bureau of the Party also controlled the Party organizations of the 13 provinces around Moscow. These 13 provinces held 37% of Russia's population and 20% of the membership of the Bolshevik faction.

In August, poor and misleading communication led General Lavr Kornilov, the recently appointed Supreme Commander of Russian military forces, to believe that the Petrograd government had already been captured by radicals, or was in serious danger thereof. In response, he ordered troops to Petrograd to pacify the city. To secure his position, Kerensky had to ask for Bolshevik assistance. He also sought help from the Petrograd Soviet, which called upon armed Red Guards to "defend the revolution". The Kornilov Affair failed largely due to the efforts of the Bolsheviks, whose influence over railroad and telegraph workers proved vital in stopping the movement of troops. With his coup failing, Kornilov surrendered and was relieved of his position. The Bolsheviks' role in stopping the attempted coup further strengthened their position.

In early September, the Petrograd Soviet freed all jailed Bolsheviks and Trotsky became chairman of the Petrograd Soviet. Growing numbers of socialists and lower-class Russians viewed the government less as a force in support of their needs and interests. The Bolsheviks benefited as the only major organized opposition party that had refused to compromise with the Provisional Government, and they benefited from growing frustration and even disgust with other parties, such as the Mensheviks and Socialist Revolutionaries, who stubbornly refused to break with the idea of national unity across all classes.

In Finland, Lenin had worked on his book State and Revolution and continued to lead his party, writing newspaper articles and policy decrees. By October, he returned to Petrograd (present-day St. Petersburg), aware that the increasingly radical city presented him no legal danger and a second opportunity for revolution. Recognising the strength of the Bolsheviks, Lenin began pressing for the immediate overthrow of the Kerensky government by the Bolsheviks. Lenin was of the opinion that taking power should occur in both St. Petersburg and Moscow simultaneously, parenthetically stating that it made no difference which city rose up first. The Bolshevik Central Committee drafted a resolution, calling for the dissolution of the Provisional Government in favor of the Petrograd Soviet. The resolution was passed 10–2 (Lev Kamenev and Grigory Zinoviev prominently dissenting) promoting the October Revolution.

== October Revolution ==
The October Revolution, which unfolded on 7 November [O.S. 25 October] 1917, was organized by the Bolshevik party. Lenin did not have any direct role in the revolution and he was hiding for his personal safety. However, in late October, Lenin secretly and at great personal risk entered Petrograd and attended a private gathering of the Bolshevik Central Committee on the evening of 23 October. The Revolutionary Military Committee established by the Bolshevik party was organizing the insurrection and Leon Trotsky was the chairman. 50,000 workers had passed a resolution in favour of Bolshevik demand for transfer of power to the soviets. However, Lenin played a crucial role in the debate in the leadership of the Bolshevik party for a revolutionary insurrection as the party in the autumn of 1917 received a majority in the soviets. An ally in the left fraction of the Revolutionary-Socialist Party, with huge support among the peasants who opposed Russia's participation in the war, supported the slogan 'All power to the Soviets'. The initial stage of the October Revolution which involved the assault on Petrograd occurred largely without any human casualties.

Liberal and monarchist forces, loosely organized into the White Army, immediately went to war against the Bolsheviks' Red Army, in a series of battles that would become known as the Russian Civil War. The Civil War began in early 1918 with domestic anti-Bolshevik forces confronting the nascent Red Army. In autumn of 1918 Allied countries needed to block German access to Russian supplies. They sent troops to support the "Whites" with supplies of weapons, ammunition and logistic equipment being sent from the main Western countries but this was not at all coordinated. Germany did not participate in the civil war as it surrendered to the Allies.

The provisional government with its second and third coalition was led by a right wing fraction of the Socialist-Revolutionary party, SR. This non-elected provisional government faced the revolutionary situation and the growing mood against the war by avoiding elections to the state Duma. However, the October revolution forced the political parties behind the newly dissolved provisional government to move and move fast for immediate elections. All happened so fast that the left SR fraction did not have time to reach out and be represented in ballots of the SR party which was part of the coalition in the provisional government. This non-elected government supported continuation of the war on the side of the allied forces. The elections to the State Duma 25 November 1917 therefore did not mirror the true political situation among peasants even if we don't know how the outcome would be if the anti-war left SR fraction had a fair chance to challenge the party leaders. In the elections, the Bolshevik party received 25% of the votes and the Socialist-Revolutionaries as much as 58%. It is possible the left SR had a good chance to reach more than 25% of the votes and thereby legitimate the October revolution but we can only guess.

After the majority of the petrograd Soviet passed into the hands of the Bolsheviks, [Trotsky] was elected its chairman and in that position organized and led the insurrection of October 25.

— Lenin on the organization of the October Revolution, Vol.XIV of the Collected Works.

Lenin did not believe that a socialist revolution necessarily presupposed a fully developed capitalist economy. A semi-capitalist country would suffice and Russia had a working class base of 5% of the population.

Though Lenin was the leader of the Bolshevik Party, it has been argued that since Lenin was not present during the actual takeover of the Winter Palace, it was really Trotsky's organization and direction that led the revolution, merely spurred by the motivation Lenin instigated within his party. Bolshevik figures such as Anatoly Lunacharsky, Moisei Uritsky and Dmitry Manuilsky agreed that Lenin's influence on the Bolshevik party was decisive but the October insurrection was carried out according to Trotsky's, not to Lenin's plan.

Critics on the Right have long argued that the financial and logistical assistance of German intelligence via their key agent, Alexander Parvus was a key component as well, though historians are divided, since there is little evidence supporting that claim.

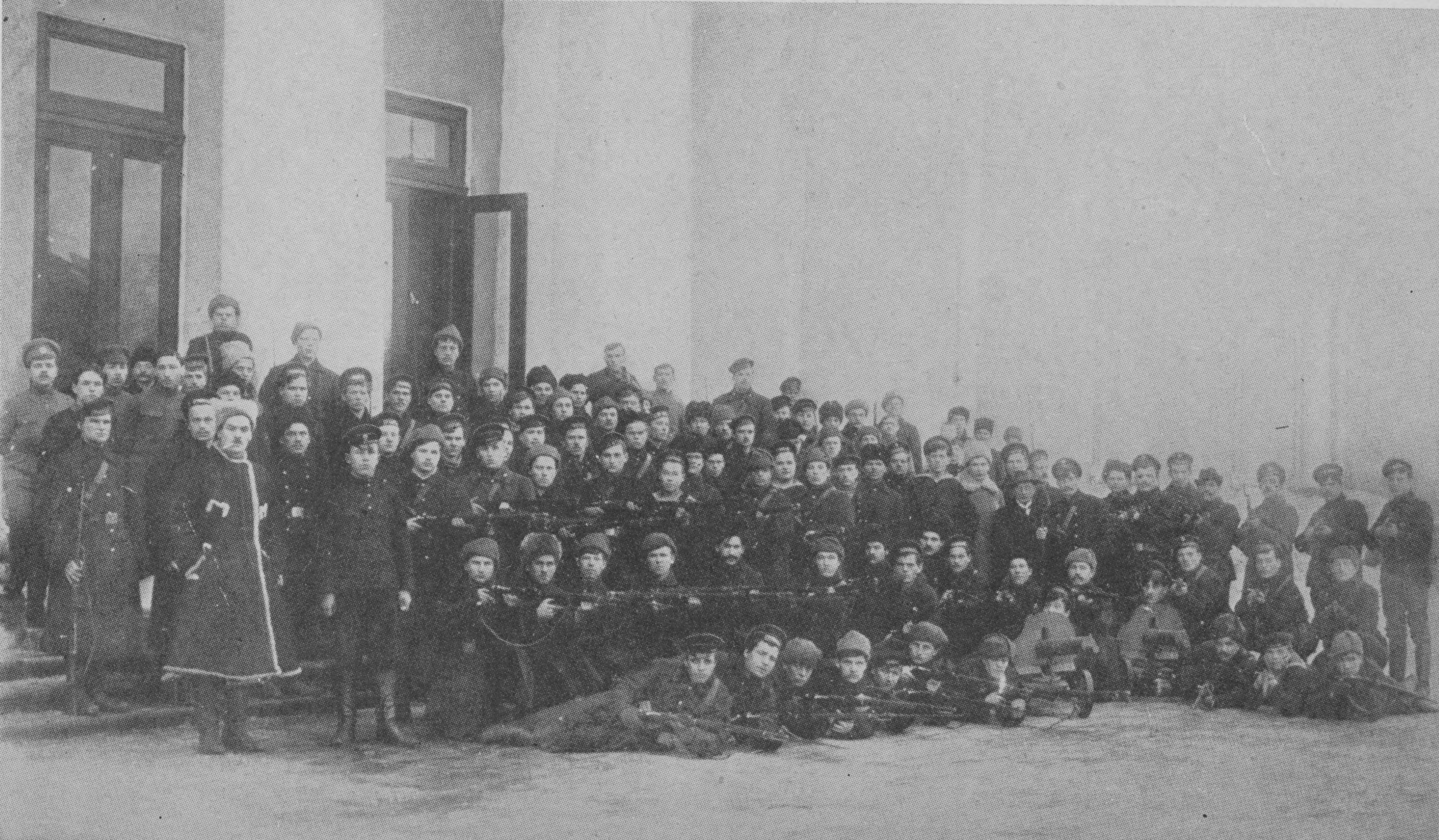
A detachment of Red Guard sailors who dissolved the Constituent Assembly

Soviet membership was initially freely elected, but many members of the Socialist Revolutionary Party, anarchists, and other leftists created opposition to the Bolsheviks through the Soviets themselves. The elections to the Russian Constituent Assembly took place 25 November 1917. The Bolsheviks gained 25% of the vote. When it became clear that the Bolsheviks had little support outside of the industrialized areas of Saint Petersburg and Moscow, they simply barred non-Bolsheviks from membership in the Soviets. The Bolsheviks dissolved the Constituent Assembly in January 1918.

== Russian Civil War ==
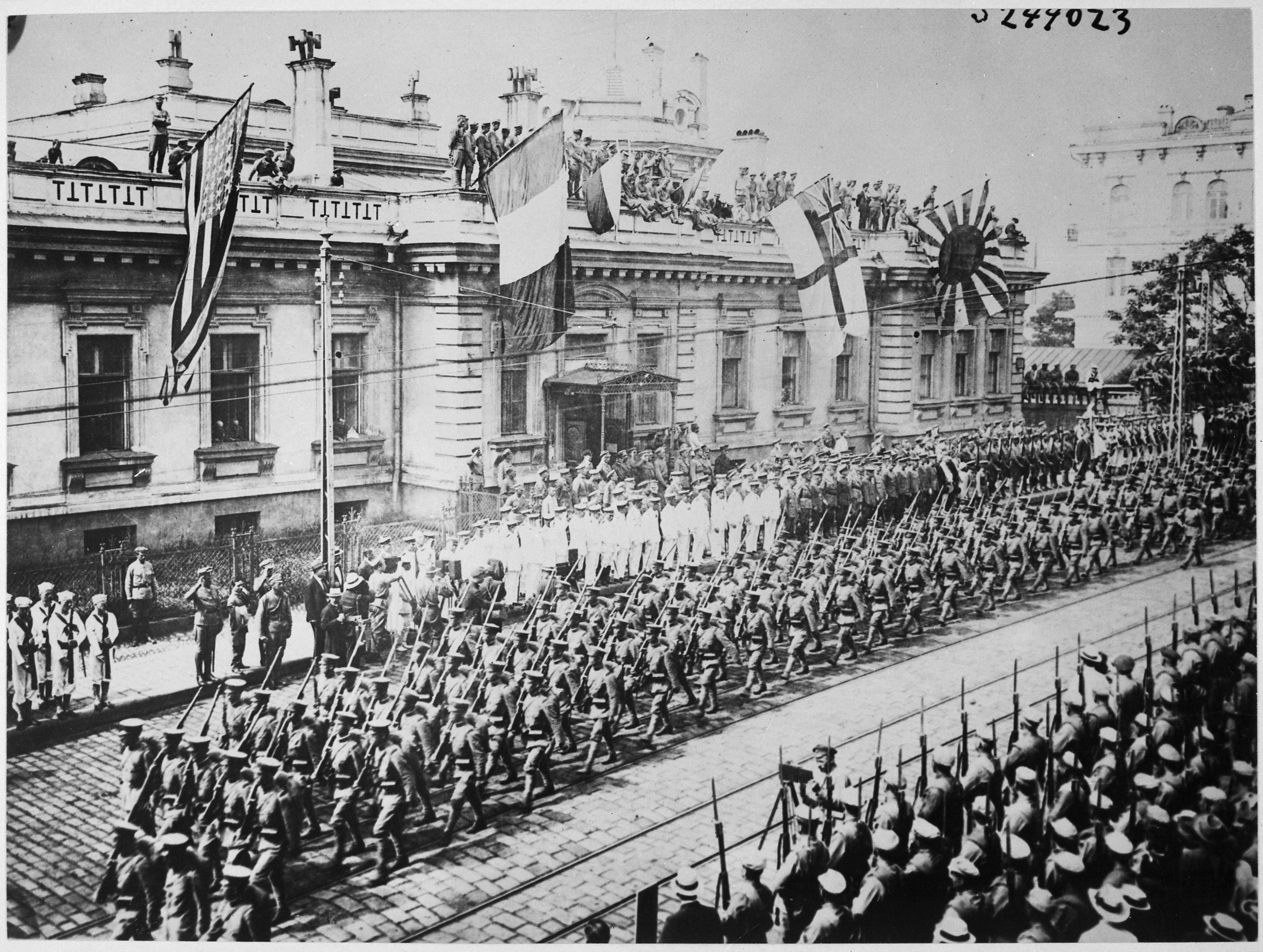
American, British, and Japanese Troops parade through Vladivostok in armed support to the White Army.

The October Revolution led by the Bolsheviks was not recognized by a variety of social and political groups, including army officers and cossacks, the "bourgeoisie" and the landowners, and political groups ranging from the far Right to the moderate socialists, the Socialist Revolutionaries and the Mensheviks, who opposed the drastic restructuring championed by the Bolsheviks following the collapse of the Provisional Government.

The Russian Civil War, which broke out in the months following the revolution, resulted in the deaths and suffering of millions of people regardless of their political orientation. The war was fought mainly between the Red Army ("Reds"), consisting of the Bolsheviks and the supporters of the Soviets, and the White movement ("Whites"), and their loosely allied "White Armies" led mainly by the right-leaning and conservative officers of the Russian Empire and the Cossacks and supported by the classes which lost their power and privileges with the Bolshevik revolution; the Civil War also included armed conflicts with nationalist movements for independence, armed struggle and terrorism by anti-Bolshevik socialists and anarchists, and uprisings of the peasants who organized themselves into the "Green armies". Although the views within the Russian Whites ranged from monarchism to socialism, the Whites generally preferred the Russian Empire to the revolution, and they were commonly seen as restorers of the old order as they fought the movements of the non-Russian nationalities in favour of "indivisible Russia" and opposed the land reform and defended the property rights of the upper classes; the socialists who opposed both factions saw the rule of the Whites (a military dictatorship headed by Alexander Kolchak and by the commanders of the White forces) as a right-wing dictatorship. The Russian Whites had backing from other countries such as the United Kingdom, France, the United States, and Japan, while the Reds possessed internal support, proving to be much more effective. Though the Allied nations, using external interference, provided substantial military aid to the Whites, they were ultimately defeated.

The Bolsheviks firstly assumed power in Petrograd, expanding their rule outwards. They eventually reached the Easterly Siberian Russian coast in Vladivostok, four years after the war began, an occupation that is believed to have ended all significant military campaigns in the nation. Less than one year later, the last area controlled by the White Army, the Ayano-Maysky District, directly to the north of the Krai containing Vladivostok, was given up when General Anatoly Pepelyayev capitulated in 1923.

Several revolts were initiated against the Bolsheviks and their army near the end of the war, notably the Kronstadt Rebellion. This was a naval mutiny engineered by Soviet Baltic sailors, former Red Army soldiers, and the people of Kronstadt. This armed uprising was fought against the antagonizing Bolshevik economic policies that farmers were subjected to, including seizures of grain crops by the Communists. This all amounted to large-scale discontent. When delegates representing the Kronstadt sailors arrived at Petrograd for negotiations, they raised 15 demands primarily pertaining to the Russian right to freedom. The Government firmly denounced the rebellions and labelled the requests as a reminder of the Social Revolutionaries, a political party that was popular among Soviets before Lenin, but refused to cooperate with the Bolshevik Army. The Government then responded with an armed suppression of these revolts and suffered ten thousand casualties before entering the city of Kronstadt. This ended the rebellions fairly quickly, causing many of the rebels to flee seeking political exile.

During the Civil War, Nestor Makhno led a Ukrainian anarchist movement. Makhno's Insurgent Army allied to the Bolsheviks thrice, with one of the powers ending the alliance each time. However, a Bolshevik force under Mikhail Frunze destroyed the Makhnovshchina, when the Makhnovists refused to merge into the Red Army. In addition, the so-called "Green Army" (peasants defending their property against the opposing forces) played a secondary role in the war, mainly in Ukraine.

=== Revolutionary tribunals ===
Revolutionary tribunals were present during both the Revolution and the Civil War, intended for the purpose of combatting forces of counter-revolution. At the Civil War's zenith, it is reported that upwards of 200,000 cases were investigated by approximately 200 tribunals. These tribunals established themselves more so from the Cheka as a more moderate force that acted under the banner of revolutionary justice, rather than a utilizer of strict brute force as the former did. However, these tribunals did come with their own set of inefficiencies, such as responding to cases in a matter of months and not having a concrete definition of "counter-revolution" that was determined on a case-by-case basis. The "Decree on Revolutionary Tribunals" used by the People's Commissar of Justice, states in article 2 that "In fixing the penalty, the Revolutionary Tribunal shall be guided by the circumstances of the case and the dictates of the revolutionary conscience." Revolutionary tribunals ultimately demonstrated that a form of justice was still prevalent in Russian society where the Russian Provisional Government failed. This, in part, triggered the political transition of the October Revolution and the Civil War that followed in its aftermath.

== Murder of the imperial family ==
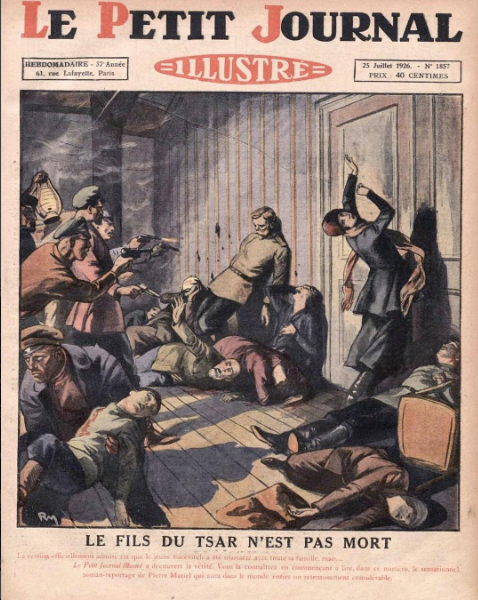
Murder of the Romanov family, Le Petit Journal

The Bolsheviks murdered the Tsar and his family on 16 July 1918. In early March 1917, the Provisional Government had placed Nicholas and his family under house arrest in the Alexander Palace at Tsarskoye Selo, 24 kilometres (15 mi) south of Petrograd. But in August 1917, they evacuated the Romanovs to Tobolsk in the Urals to protect them from the rising tide of revolution. After the Bolsheviks came to power in October 1917, the conditions of their imprisonment grew stricter and talk of putting Nicholas on trial increased. In April and May 1918, the looming civil war led the Bolsheviks to move the family to the stronghold of Yekaterinburg.

During the early morning of 16 July, Nicholas, Alexandra, their children, their physician, and several servants were taken into the basement and shot. According to Edvard Radzinsky and Dmitrii Volkogonov, the order came directly from Lenin and Yakov Sverdlov in Moscow. However, this claim has never been confirmed. The murder may have been carried out on the initiative of local Bolshevik officials, or it may have been an option pre-approved in Moscow as White troops were rapidly approaching Yekaterinburg. Radzinsky noted that Lenin's bodyguard personally delivered the telegram ordering the killing and that he was ordered to destroy the evidence.

== Symbolism ==
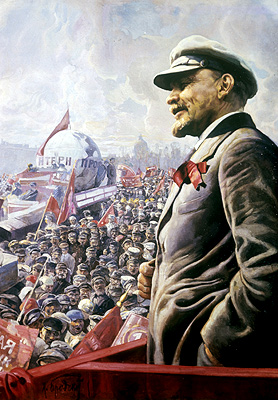
Soviet painting Vladimir Lenin, by Isaac Brodsky

The Russian Revolution became the site for many instances of symbolism, both physical and non-physical. Communist symbolism is perhaps the most notable of this time period, such as the debut of the iconic hammer and sickle as a representation of the October Revolution in 1917, eventually becoming the official symbol of the USSR in 1924, and later the symbol of Communism as a whole. Although the Bolsheviks did not have extensive political experience, their portrayal of the revolution itself as both a political and symbolic order resulted in Communism's portrayal as a messianic faith, formally known as communist messianism. Portrayals of notable revolutionary figures such as Lenin were done in iconographic methods, equating them similarly to religious figures, though religion itself was banned in the USSR and groups such as the Russian Orthodox Church were persecuted.

== The revolution and the world ==
The revolution ultimately led to the establishment of the future Soviet Union as an ideocracy; however, the establishment of such a state came as an ideological paradox, as Marx's ideals of how a socialist state ought to be created were based on the formation being natural and not artificially incited (i.e. by means of revolution). Leon Trotsky said that the goal of socialism in Russia would not be realized without the success of the world revolution. A revolutionary wave caused by the Russian Revolution lasted until 1923, but despite initial hopes for success in the German Revolution of 1918–19, the short-lived Hungarian Soviet Republic, and others like it, only the Mongolian Revolution of 1921 saw a Marxist movement at the time succeed in keeping power in its hands.

This issue is subject to conflicting views on communist history by various Marxist groups and parties. Joseph Stalin later rejected this concept, stating that socialism was possible in one country. The confusion regarding Stalin's position on the issue stems from the fact that, after Lenin's death in 1924, he successfully used Lenin's argument – the argument that socialism's success needs the support of workers of other countries in order to happen – to defeat his competitors within the party by accusing them of betraying Lenin and, therefore, the ideals of the October Revolution.

The Russian Revolution was perceived as a rupture with imperialism for various civil rights and decolonization struggles and providing a space for oppressed groups across the world. This was given further credence with the Soviet Union supporting many anti-colonial third world movements with financial funds against European colonial powers.

== Historiography ==
Few events in historical research have been as conditioned by political influences as the October Revolution. The historiography of the Revolution generally divides into three schools of thought: the Soviet-Marxist (Marxist-Leninist) view, the Western 'totalitarian' view, and the 'revisionist' view. The 'totalitarian' historians are also referred to as 'traditionalists' and 'Cold War historians' for relying on interpretations rooted in the early years of the Cold War and described as a conservative direction; the Western Revisionists have lacked a full-fledged doctrine or philosophy of history, but were distinguished in the 1960s-1970s by their criticism of the 'traditionalist' bias towards the USSR and the left in general and their focus on "history from below" and social perspectives. While the 'totalitarian' historians described the Bolshevik revolution as a coup carried out by a minority which turned Russia into a totalitarian dictatorship, the 'revisionists' opposed such description and stressed the genuinely 'popular' nature of the Revolution. Since the Revolutions of 1989 and the dissolution of the Soviet Union in 1991, the Western-Totalitarian view has again become dominant and the Soviet-Marxist view has practically vanished in mainstream political analysis. The 'revisionists' achieved some success in challenging the 'traditionalists' and became accepted in academic circles, while 'totalitarian' historians retained popularity and influence in politics and public spheres.

Following the death of Vladimir Lenin, the Bolshevik government was thrown into a crisis. Lenin failed to designate who his successor would be or how they would be chosen. A power struggle broke out in the party between Leon Trotsky and his enemies. Trotsky was defeated by the anti-Trotsky bloc by the mid-1920s and his hopes for party leadership were dashed. Among Trotsky's opponents, Joseph Stalin would rise to assume unchallenged party leadership by 1928. In 1927, Trotsky was expelled from the party and in 1929 he lost his citizenship and was sent into exile. While in exile he began honing his own interpretation of Marxism called Trotskyism. The schism between Trotsky and Stalin is the focal point where the Revisionist view comes into existence. Trotsky traveled across the world denouncing Stalin and the Soviet Union under his leadership. He specifically focused his criticism on Stalin's doctrine, Socialism in One Country, claiming that it was incongruent with the ideology of the revolution. Eventually, Trotsky settled in Mexico City and founded a base of operations for him and his supporters. In 1937 at the height of the Great Purge, he published The Revolution Betrayed which outlined his ideological contradictions with Stalin, and how Stalin was guilty of subverting and debasing the 1917 revolution. He continued to vocally criticize Stalin and Stalinism until his assassination in 1940 on Stalin's orders.

The Soviet-Marxist interpretation is the belief that the Russian Revolution under the Bolsheviks was a proud and glorious effort of the working class which saw the removal of the Tsar, nobility, and capitalists from positions of power. The Bolsheviks and later the Communist Party took the first steps in liberating the proletariat and building a workers' state that practiced equality. Outside of Eastern Europe this view was heavily criticized as following the death of Lenin the Soviet Union became more authoritarian. Even though the Soviet Union no longer exists, the Soviet-Marxist view is still used as an interpretation in academia today. Both academics and Soviet supporters argue this view is supported by several events. First, the RSFSR made substantial advances to women's rights. It was the first country to decriminalize abortion and allowed women to be educated, which was forbidden under the Tsar. Furthermore, the RSFSR decriminalized homosexuality between consenting adults, which was seen as radical for the time period. The Bolshevik government also actively recruited working class citizens into positions of party leadership, thereby ensuring the proletariat was represented in policymaking. One of the most important aspects to this view was the Bolshevik victory in the Russian Civil War. On paper, the Bolsheviks should have been defeated in part due to the broad international support their enemies were receiving. Britain, France, the United States, Japan, and other countries sent aid to the White Army and expedition forces against the Bolsheviks. The Bolsheviks were further at a disadvantage due to factors such as: the small land area under their control, lack of professional officers, and supply shortages. In spite of this, the Red Army prevailed. The Red Army unlike many White factions maintained a high morale among their troops and civilians throughout the duration of the civil war. This was in part due to their skillful use of propaganda. Bolshevik propaganda portrayed the Red Army as liberators and stewards of the poor and downtrodden. Bolshevik support was further elevated by Lenin's initiatives to distribute land to the peasantry, and ending the war with Germany. During the civil war, the Bolsheviks were able to raise an army numbering around five million active soldiers. Domestic support and patriotism played a decisive role in the Russian Civil War. By 1923 the Bolsheviks had controlled the last of the White Army holdouts and the Russian Civil War concluded with a Bolshevik victory. This victory ultimately influenced how the Soviet Union interpreted its own ideology and the October Revolution itself. Starting in 1919, the Soviets would commemorate the event with a military parade and a public holiday. This tradition lasted up until the collapse of the Soviet Union. As time went on the Soviet-Marxist interpretation evolved with an "anti-Stalinist" version of it. This subsection attempts to draw a distinction between the "Lenin period" (1917–24) and the "Stalin period" (1928–53).

Nikita Khrushchev, Stalin's successor, argued that Stalin's regime differed greatly from the leadership of Lenin in his "Secret Speech", delivered in 1956. He was critical of the cult of the individual which was constructed around Stalin whereas Lenin stressed "the role of the people as the creator of history". He also emphasized that Lenin favored a collective leadership which relied on personal persuasion and recommended the removal of Stalin from the position of General Secretary. Khrushchev contrasted this with the "despotism" of Stalin which require absolute submission to his position and also highlighted that many of the people who were later annihilated as "enemies of the party", "had worked with Lenin during his life". He also contrasted the "severe methods" used by Lenin in the "most necessary cases" as a "struggle for survival" during the Civil War with the extreme methods and mass repressions used by Stalin even when the Revolution was "already victorious".

Views from the west were mixed. Socialists and labor organizations tended to support the October Revolution and the Bolshevik seizure of power. On the other hand, western governments were mortified. Western leaders, and later some academics concluded that the Russian Revolution only replaced one form of tyranny (Tsarism), with another (communism). Initially, the Bolsheviks were tolerant of opposing political factions. Upon seizing state power, they organized a parliament, the Russian Constituent Assembly. On 25 November, an election was held. Despite the Bolsheviks being the party that overthrew the Provisional Government and organizing the assembly, they lost the election. Rather than govern as a coalition, the Bolsheviks banned all political opposition. Historians point to this as the start of communist authoritarianism. Conservative historian Robert Service states, "he (Lenin) aided the foundations of dictatorship and lawlessness. He had consolidated the principle of state penetration of the whole society, its economy and its culture. Lenin had practiced terror and advocated revolutionary amoralism." Lenin allowed for certain disagreement and debate but only within the highest organs of the Bolshevik party, and practicing democratic centralism. The RSFSR and later the Soviet Union continued to practice political repression until its dissolution in 1991.

Trotskyist theoreticians have disputed the view that a one-party state was a natural outgrowth of the Bolsheviks' actions. George Novack stressed the initial efforts by the Bolsheviks to form a government with the Left Socialist Revolutionaries and bring other parties such as the Mensheviks into political legality. Tony Cliff argued the Bolshevik–Left Socialist Revolutionary coalition government dissolved the Constituent Assembly due to a number of reasons. They cited the outdated voter-rolls which did not acknowledge the split among the Socialist Revolutionary party and the assemblies conflict with the Congress of the Soviets as an alternative democratic structure. Trotskyist historian Vadim Rogovin believed Stalinism had "discredited the idea of socialism in the eyes of millions of people throughout the world". Rogovin also argued that the Left Opposition, led by Leon Trotsky, was a political movement "which offered a real alternative to Stalinism, and that to crush this movement was the primary function of the Stalinist terror".

== Cultural portrayal ==
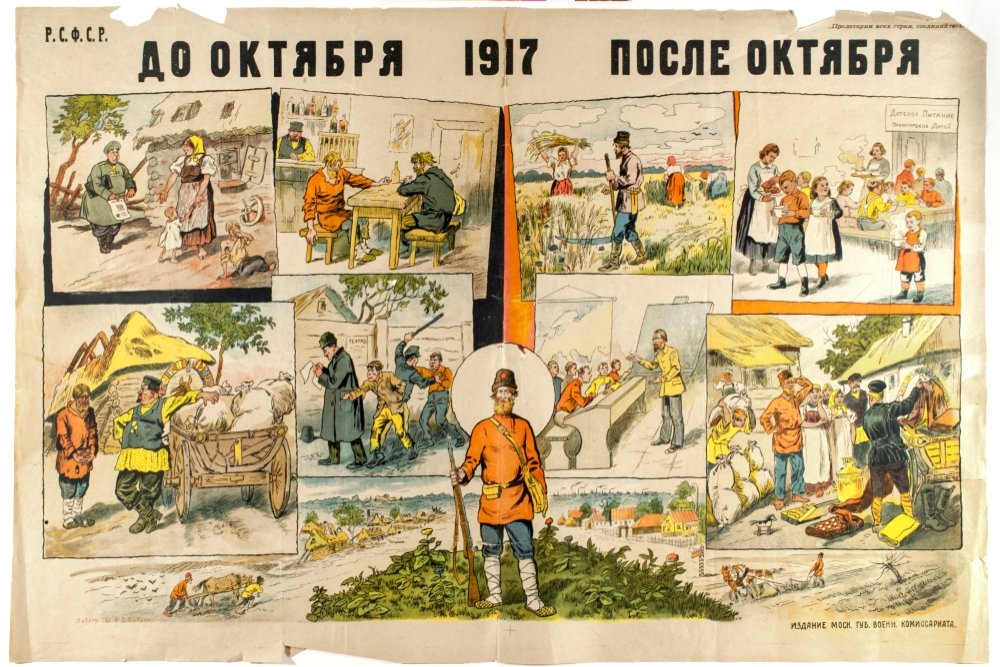
A poster depicting the effect of the Revolution on the life of a peasant, 1920. From the collections of RGASPI

=== Literature ===
- The Twelve (1918) by the Symbolist poet Aleksandr Blok and Mystery-Bouffe (1918) and 150 000 000 by the Futurist poet Vladimir Mayakovsky were among the first poetic responses to the Revolution.
- The White Guard by Mikhail Bulgakov (1925), partially autobiographical novel, portraying the life of one family torn apart by uncertainty of the Civil War times; his short novel Heart of a Dog (1925) has been interpreted as a satirical allegory of the Revolution.
- The Life of Klim Samgin (1927–1936) by Maxim Gorky, a novel with a controversial reputation sometimes described as an example of Modernist literature, portrays the decline of Russian intelligentsia from the early 1870s to the Revolution as seen by a middle class intellectual during the course of his life.
- Chevengur (1929) by Andrei Platonov depicts the Revolution and the Civil War in a grotesque way in a form of a Modernist parable, as a struggle between the Utopia and the Dystopia that confounds the both, and as associated by the motifs of death and apocalypse.
- Mikhail Sholokhov's novel Quiet Flows the Don (1928–1940) describes the lives of Don Cossacks during World War I, the Revolution, and the Civil War.
- George Orwell's classic novella Animal Farm (1945) is an allegory of the Russian Revolution and its aftermath. It describes the dictator Joseph Stalin as a big Berkshire boar named, "Napoleon". Trotsky is represented by a pig called Snowball who is a brilliant talker and makes magnificent speeches. However, Napoleon overthrows Snowball as Stalin overthrew Trotsky and Napoleon takes over the farm the animals live on. Napoleon becomes a tyrant and uses force and propaganda to oppress the animals, while culturally teaching them that they are free.
- Doctor Zhivago (1957) by Boris Pasternak describes the fate of Russian intelligentsia; the events take place between the Revolution of 1905 and World War II.
- The Red Wheel (1984–1991) by Aleksandr Solzhenitsyn, a cycle of novels that describes the fall of the Russian Empire and the establishment of the Soviet Union.

=== Film ===
The Russian Revolution has been portrayed in or served as backdrop for many films. Among them, in order of release date:

- The End of Saint Petersburg. 1927. Directed by Vsevolod Pudovkin and Mikhail Doller, USSR
- October: Ten Days That Shook the World. 1927. Directed by Sergei Eisenstein and Grigori Aleksandrov. Soviet Union. Black and white. Silent.
- Scarlet Dawn, a 1932 Pre-Code American romantic drama starring Douglas Fairbanks, Jr. and Nancy Carroll caught up in the fallout of the Russian Revolution.
- Knight Without Armour. 1937. A British historical drama starring Marlene Dietrich and Robert Donat, with Dietrich as an imperiled aristocrat on the eve of the Russian Revolution.
- Lenin in 1918. 1939. Directed by Mikhail Romm, E. Aron, and I. Simkov. Historical-revolutionary film about Lenin's activities in the first years of Soviet power.
- Doctor Zhivago. 1965. A drama-romance-war film directed by David Lean, filmed in Europe with a largely European cast, loosely based on the famous novel of the same name by Boris Pasternak.
- Reds. 1981. Directed by Warren Beatty, it is based on the book Ten Days that Shook the World.
- Anastasia. 1997. An American animated feature, directed by Don Bluth and Gary Goldman.

== See also ==
- Bibliography of the Russian Revolution and Civil War
- Outline of the Russian Revolution and Civil War
- Index of articles related to the Russian Revolution and Civil War
- April Crisis
- Foreign relations of the Soviet Union
- Iranian Revolution
- Arthur Ransome
- Paris Commune
- Preference falsification
- Ten Days That Shook the World
