= Judge Casey =

Judge Casey may refer to:

- Joseph Casey (congressman) (1814–1879), judge of the United States Court of Claims
- Richard C. Casey (1933–2007), judge of the United States District Court for the Southern District of New York
