= Handschu agreement =

Political guidelines in New York City

The Handschu agreement is a set of guidelines that regulate police behavior in New York City with regard to political activity.

== Background ==
In 1971, members of the Black Panther Party known as the Panther 21 were tried for conspiracy to blow up police stations and department stores. They were acquitted of all charges after only 90 minutes of jury deliberation. The trial revealed the extent to which the NYPD had infiltrated and kept dossiers on not only the Black Panthers and other radical groups, but also on anti-war groups, gay rights activists, educational reform advocates, religious groups, and civic organizations.

The Handschu agreement, or decree, was the result of a class-action lawsuit filed against the City of New York, its Police Commissioner and the Intelligence Division of the New York City Police Department (NYPD) on behalf of Barbara Handschu and fifteen other plaintiffs affiliated with various political or ideological associations and organizations, known as Handschu v. Special Services Division, 605 F.Supp. 1384, affirmed 787 F.2d 828. The plaintiffs claimed that "informers and infiltrators provoked, solicited and induced members of lawful political and social groups to engage in unlawful activities"; that files were maintained with respect to "persons, places, and activities entirely unrelated to legitimate law enforcement purposes, such as those attending meetings of lawful organizations"; and that information from these files was made available to academic institutions, prospective employers, licensing agencies and others. In addition, plaintiffs protested seven types of police misconduct: (1) the use of informers; (2) infiltration; (3) interrogation; (4) overt surveillance; (5) summary punishment; (6) intelligence gathering; and (7) electronic surveillance, and alleged that these police practices which punished and repressed lawful dissent had had a "chilling effect" upon the exercise of freedom of speech, assembly and association, that they violated constitutional prohibitions against unreasonable searches and seizures, and that they abridged rights of privacy and due process.

In 1985, the court found that police surveillance of political activity violated constitutional protections of free speech. This ruling resulted in a consent decree which prohibited the NYPD from engaging "in any investigation of political activity except through the … Intelligence Division [of the Police Department]" and required that any "such investigations shall be conducted" only in accordance with the Guidelines incorporated into the Decree. The Guidelines further prohibited the Intelligence Division from "commencing an investigation" into the political, ideological or religious activities of an individual or group unless "specific information has been received by the Police Department that a person or group engaged in political activity is engaged in, about to engage in or has threatened to engage in conduct which constitutes a crime…."

== Provisions ==
According to the terms of the agreement, purely political activity can only be investigated by the Public Security Section (PSS) of the NYPD's Intelligence Division, and then only when the Section suspects criminal activity. When the PSS does suspect criminal activity on the part of political groups, it must obtain a warrant from the three-person Handschu Authority, a commission made up of two deputy commissioners and a mayor-appointed civilian.

The agreement also prohibits indiscriminate police videorecording and photographing of public gatherings when there is no indication that unlawful activity is occurring.

The department is also prohibited from sharing information pertaining to political activity with other law enforcement agencies unless those agencies agree to abide by the terms of the Handschu agreement.

The court order mandates the compiling of annual, publicly available reports listing the surveillance requests made by the NYPD and the number of such requests granted.

== In the 21st century ==
In 2002, the NYPD asked federal judge Charles S. Haight Jr., the judge who presided over the original case, to abrogate numerous provisions of the agreement, claiming that they inhibited the department's ability to prevent future terrorist attacks. The requests, if granted, would allow any branch of the department to investigate any political activity, even without suspicion of criminal activity, but only by accessing publicly available meetings and information "as members of the public." It would further allow the department to perform any type of surveillance of public gatherings deemed Constitutional, which is likely to include videorecording. The department also requested that the function of the Handschu authority be changed to investigating complaints of constitutional violations, which would take away the authority's power to oversee political investigations.

In regards to the requested changes, Police Commissioner Raymond W. Kelly said, "Today we live in a more dangerous, constantly changing world, one with challenges and threats that were never envisioned when the Handschu guidelines were written."

Chris Dunn of the New York Civil Liberties Union, called the proposal "troubling," stating that the NYPD "has no legitimate reason to spy on lawful political activity."

Former New York City mayor Ed Koch, previously a critic of police surveillance, agreed with the proposal to rescind large portions of the Handschu agreement. "That's the necessary cost of protecting the public in these times where we're dealing with terrorism," he said.

On February 11, 2003, Haight ruled that the NYPD should be permitted to modify the 1985 Decree, but not to the extent originally requested by the City. The judge instructed the city to adapt the U.S. Attorney General's Guidelines on General Crimes, Racketeering Enterprise and Terrorism Enterprise Investigations, issued by Attorney General John Ashcroft in May, 2002. This weakened the original decree in that a preliminary inquiry could be initiated when there is "information … which indicates the possibility of criminal activity."

In February 2007, Judge Haight ruled that the NYPD had violated the terms of the agreement by videotaping two demonstrations by advocates of the homeless, one in Harlem in March 2005, the other in front of New York City Mayor Michael Bloomberg's house in December 2005. On June 13, 2007, Haight reversed the ruling, saying that attorneys for the city had provided new evidence indicating that the protestors may have been "disorderly." Lawyers for the demonstrators vowed to continue fighting to prove that the action was legal and peaceful.

== See also ==
- Red Squad
