= Paul R. Hays =

American judge (1903–1980)

Senior Judge of the United States Court of Appeals for the Second Circuit
- In office September 11, 1974 – February 13, 1980

Judge of the United States Court of Appeals for the Second Circuit
- In office October 5, 1961 – September 11, 1974
- Appointed by: John F. Kennedy
- Preceded by: Seat established by 75 Stat. 80
- Succeeded by: Murray Gurfein

Personal details
- Born: Paul Raymond Hays; April 2, 1903 Des Moines, Iowa
- Died: February 13, 1980 (aged 76)
- Spouse: Elinor Rice Hays
- Education: Columbia University (AB, MA); Columbia Law School (LLB)

Paul Raymond Hays (April 2, 1903 – February 13, 1980) was a United States circuit judge of the United States Court of Appeals for the Second Circuit.

== Education and career ==
Born in Des Moines, Iowa, Hays received an Artium Baccalaureus degree from Columbia University in 1924. He received a Master of Arts from the same institution in 1927. He received a Bachelor of Laws from Columbia Law School in 1933. He was in private practice of law in New York City, New York from 1933 to 1936. He was legal counsel for the National Industrial Recovery and Resettlement Administration from 1934 to 1935. He was faculty at Columbia University from 1936 to 1961, as an assistant professor of law from 1936 to 1943, and as a professor of law from 1943 to 1961. He was legal consultant for the New York State Banking Department from 1936 to 1945. He was a member of the United States Board of Legal Examiners from 1941 to 1944.

== Federal judicial service ==
Hays received a recess appointment from President John F. Kennedy on October 5, 1961, to the United States Court of Appeals for the Second Circuit, to a new seat authorized by 75 Stat. 80. He was nominated to the same position by President Kennedy on January 15, 1962. He was confirmed by the United States Senate on March 16, 1962, and received his commission on March 17, 1962. He assumed senior status on September 11, 1974. His service terminated on February 13, 1980, due to his death.

== Sources ==
Legal offices
Preceded by Seat established by 75 Stat. 80	Judge of the United States Court of Appeals for the Second Circuit; 1962–1974	Succeeded by Murray Gurfein
