= Murray Gurfein =

American judge (1907–1979)

Judge of the United States Court of Appeals for the Second Circuit
- In office August 27, 1974 – December 16, 1979
- Nominated by: Richard Nixon
- Appointed by: Gerald Ford
- Preceded by: Paul R. Hays
- Succeeded by: Lawrence W. Pierce

Judge of the United States District Court for the Southern District of New York
- In office May 20, 1971 – September 11, 1974
- Appointed by: Richard Nixon
- Preceded by: Thomas Francis Murphy
- Succeeded by: Charles S. Haight Jr.

Personal details
- Born: Murray Irwin Gurfein; November 17, 1907 New York City, U.S.
- Died: December 16, 1979 (aged 72) New York City, U.S.
- Spouse: Eva Hadas (m. 1931)
- Children: 2
- Education: Columbia University (BA); Harvard University (LLB)

Murray Irwin Gurfein (November 17, 1907 – December 16, 1979) was a United States circuit judge of the United States Court of Appeals for the Second Circuit and prior to that a United States District Judge of the United States District Court for the Southern District of New York.

== Early life and career ==
Born on November 17, 1907, in New York City, Gurfein received a Bachelor of Arts degree from Columbia College in 1926. He received a Bachelor of Laws from Harvard Law School in 1930. He served as a law clerk for Judge Julian Mack of the United States Court of Appeals for the Seventh Circuit, from 1930 to 1931. He was an Assistant United States Attorney for the Southern District of New York, from 1931 to 1933. He was in private practice of law in New York City from 1933 to 1935. He was a deputy assistant district attorney of New York County, from 1935 to 1938. He was an assistant district attorney of New York County, from 1938 to 1942. He was in the United States Army as a lieutenant colonel, in the Office of Strategic Services, from 1942 to 1946. He was an assistant to Justice Robert H. Jackson, the United States Chief Counsel at the Nuremberg trials in 1945. He was in private practice of law in New York City from 1946 to 1971.

Gurfein was elected president of HIAS (Hebrew Immigrant Aid Society) from 1956 to 1957 and from 1960 to 1967.

== Federal judicial service ==
Gurfein was nominated by President Richard Nixon on April 14, 1971, to a seat on the United States District Court for the Southern District of New York vacated by Judge Thomas Francis Murphy. He was confirmed by the United States Senate on May 20, 1971, and received his commission the same day. His service was terminated on September 11, 1974, due to elevation to the Second Circuit.

Gurfein was nominated by President Nixon on July 11, 1974, to a seat on the United States Court of Appeals for the Second Circuit vacated by Judge Paul R. Hays. He was confirmed by the United States Senate on August 22, 1974, and received his commission on August 27, 1974, from President Gerald Ford. His service was terminated on December 16, 1979, due to death.

== Pentagon Papers case ==
During his first week as a United States District Judge, Gurfein was assigned the Pentagon Papers case and gained national prominence when he refused the government's motion to enjoin publication of the documents. Gurfein's ruling was initially reversed by the Court of Appeals, but ultimately reinstated by the Supreme Court. Gurfein wrote: "The security of the Nation is not at the ramparts alone. Security also lies in the value of our free institutions. A cantankerous press, an obstinate press, an ubiquitous press must be suffered by those in authority in order to preserve the even greater values of freedom of expression and the right of the people to know."

== Personal life ==
In 1931, he married Eva Hadas. The couple had two daughters: Abigail and Susan Hadas.

Gurfein died in New York City on December 16, 1979.

== See also ==
- List of Jewish American jurists

Legal offices
Preceded by Thomas Francis Murphy	Judge of the United States District Court for the Southern District of New York; 1971–1974	Succeeded by Charles S. Haight Jr.
Preceded by Paul R. Hays	Judge of the United States Court of Appeals for the Second Circuit; 1974–1979	Succeeded by Lawrence W. Pierce
