= Elinor Rice Hays =

American biographer and novelist

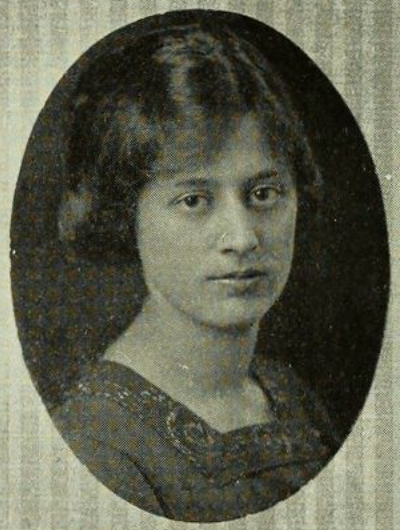
- Elinor Rice, from the 1923 yearbook of Barnard College
- Born: Elinor Rice; October 12, 1901; New York City
- Died: March 21, 1994 (aged 92); New York City
- Occupations: Biographer, novelist
- Spouse(s): George Novack (div. 1942); Paul R. Hays (married 1949)

Elinor S. Rice Hays (October 12, 1901 – March 21, 1994) was an American biographer and novelist.

== Early life ==
Elinor S. Rice was born in New York City as the daughter of Jacques Bernard Rice and Rose Frankfeld Rice. All of her grandparents were from Bavaria. Her father was a silver merchant. She graduated from Barnard College in 1923.

== Career ==
During her first marriage, Rice ran a bookshop and wrote three novels. She was a member of the Communist League of America. During the 1960s, she wrote two biographies, one of suffragist Lucy Stone, and one of the Blackwell family, especially the physician sisters Elizabeth Blackwell and Emily Blackwell.

== Publications ==
- The Best Butter (1938, novel)
- Action in Havana (1940, novel)
- Mirror, Mirror (1946, novel)
- Morning Star: A Biography of Lucy Stone, 1818-1893 (1961, biography)
- Those Extraordinary Blackwells (1967, biography)

== Personal life ==
Elinor Rice married twice. Her first husband was George Novack, a Marxist writer. With Novack, she was friends with writers Lionel and Diana Trilling. The Novacks divorced in 1942. Her second husband was judge Paul R. Hays. They married in 1949, and he died in 1980. In New York City, she died in 1994 at age 92. Some of her personal papers and research materials about the Blackwells are in the collection of Columbia University Libraries.
