= Barbara Handschu =

American lawyer and civil libertarian

Barbara Ellen Handschu (born June 28, 1942) is an American political activist and lawyer, whose surname was memorialized on a set of federal guidelines "[ordering] restrictions on police surveillance ... signed by the city [of New York] in 1985", which became known as the Handschu decree.

== Early life and education ==
Handschu completed her undergraduate studies at New York University. She later earned her law degree at the University of Michigan Law School in 1963. She began her career as a law secretary to Justice Hilda Schwartz until her 1969 arrest at a squatters' demonstration in Manhattan caused her to switch careers to criminal defense lawyer.

== Career ==
Handschu was an activist lawyer, representing, among others, the Young Lords of Spanish Harlem (to one of whom, Robert Lemus, she was briefly married), the Black Panthers, the Chicago Seven, and participants in the Attica Prison riots.

She had been a resident of Buffalo, New York, and now is exclusively practicing matrimonial and custody law in New York City; she no longer practices criminal law. She served as the first female president of the New York chapter of the American Academy of Matrimonial Lawyers in the mid-1990s and served as president of the American Academy of Matrimonial Lawyers from 2002-2003. As of 2016, she worked in New York as a divorce attorney.

Handschu has appeared in court multiple times regarding the original lawsuit filed against the New York Police Department in 1971 (over how the department spied on protestors during the Vietnam War era), including in 2013, when the department came under scrutiny for targeting Muslim communities following a rollback of the Handschu guidelines by a judge in 2003.

== Personal life ==
Handschu lives in Manhattan, returning to the city in 2013 after living in Buffalo for decades. Handschu participated in political and non-political protests over issues like Vietnam, women's rights, and race.

== Handschu Decree ==
For a more detailed history see Handschu decree main page.

Barbara Handschu’s name was first on the list of plaintiffs in a May 1971 lawsuit challenging “how New York City police officers conducted surveillance of political activities.” The results of this lawsuit led to a consent decree which was signed by Federal Judge Charles S. Haight, Jr. in 1985 and became known as the Handschu Decree.

In 2019, the New York City Municipal Archives “digitized more than 140 hours of 16mm surveillance-film footage created by the New York City Police Department (NYPD)’s photography unit between 1960 and 1980” and is “closely related to the historical paper records, often referred to as the “Handschu” files.”

== See also ==
- Police Surveillance of Political Activity -- The History and Current State of the Handschu Decree. Testimony of Arthur N. Eisenberg Presented to the New York Advisory Committee to the U.S. Commission on Civil Rights. New York Civil Liberties Union (May 21, 2003).
