= Cathy Seibel =

American judge (born 1960)

Senior Judge of the United States District Court for the Southern District of New York
- Incumbent
- Assumed office November 3, 2025

Judge of the United States District Court for the Southern District of New York
- In office July 30, 2008 – November 3, 2025
- Appointed by: George W. Bush
- Preceded by: Richard C. Casey
- Succeeded by: vacant

Personal details
- Born: 1960 (age 65–66) West Islip, New York, U.S.
- Spouse: Barron H. Lerner (m. 1990)
- Education: Princeton University (AB); Fordham University (JD)

Cathy Seibel (born 1960) is a senior United States district judge of the United States District Court for the Southern District of New York.

== Early life and education ==
Born in West Islip, New York, Seibel graduated from Princeton University with her Artium Baccalaureus degree in 1982 and later from Fordham University School of Law with a Juris Doctor in 1985. At Fordham, Seibel served as Editor-in-Chief of the Fordham Law Review.

== Career ==
Following law school graduation, Seibel worked as a law clerk for United States District Judge Joseph M. McLaughlin of the United States District Court for the Eastern District of New York from 1985 to 1987. From 1987 to 1991, Seibel was an assistant United States attorney for the Southern District of New York with the U.S. Attorney's Office.

Seibel was assigned to serve as special assistant United States attorney for the United States District Court for the Western District of Washington from 1991 to 1993. From 1993 to 1997, Seibel was assistant United States attorney for the Southern District of New York before serving as AUSA-in-Charge of the White Plains branch from 1997 to 1999. Seibel was a senior trial counsel with the United States Attorney's Office from 1999 to 2005. She was appointed deputy U.S. attorney for the Southern District of New York, where she served from 2005 to 2008.

=== Federal judicial career ===
Seibel was nominated to the United States District Court for the Southern District of New York by President George W. Bush on March 11, 2008 to a seat vacated by the death of Judge Richard C. Casey. Seibel was confirmed by the Senate on July 22, 2008 and received her commission on July 30, 2008. She assumed senior status on November 3, 2025.

Legal offices
Preceded by Richard C. Casey	Judge of the United States District Court for the Southern District of New York; 2008–2025	Vacant
