= Coeducation at Princeton University =

Mixed-sex education at Princeton University

Coeducation at Princeton University refers to the transition of Princeton University from being a single-sex education university which only admitted males to being a mixed-sex education university.

In 1967 Princeton University president Robert F. Goheen announced in The Daily Princetonian that "It is inevitable that, at some point in the future, Princeton is going to move into the education of women." Women were first accepted in 1969: 40 members of the class of 1973 and 90 transfer students.

In 1887, the university actually maintained and staffed a sister college, Evelyn College for Women, in the town of Princeton on Evelyn and Nassau streets. It was closed after roughly a decade of operation. After abortive discussions with Sarah Lawrence College to relocate the women's college to Princeton and merge it with the University in 1967, the administration decided to admit women and turned to the issue of transforming the school's operations and facilities into a female-friendly campus. The administration had barely finished these plans in April 1969 when the admissions office began mailing out its acceptance letters. Its five-year coeducation plan provided $7.8 million for the development of new facilities that would eventually house and educate 650 women students at Princeton by 1974. Ultimately, 148 women, consisting of 100 freshmen and transfer students of other years, entered Princeton on September 6, 1969 amidst much media attention. Princeton enrolled its first female graduate student, Sabra Follett Meservey, as a PhD candidate in Turkish history in 1961. A handful of undergraduate women had studied at Princeton from 1963 on, spending their junior year there to study "critical languages" in which Princeton's offerings surpassed those of their home institutions. They were considered regular students for their year on campus, but were not candidates for a Princeton degree.

As a result of a 1979 lawsuit by Sally Frank, Princeton's eating clubs were required to go coeducational in 1991, after Tiger Inn's appeal to the U.S. Supreme Court was denied. In 1987, the university changed the gendered lyrics of “Old Nassau” to reflect the school's co-educational student body. In 2009-11, Professor Nannerl O. Keohane chaired a committee on undergraduate women's leadership at Princeton, appointed by President Shirley M. Tilghman.

== Women in World War II Defense Courses ==
In 1942, Princeton started allowing women in some US-government funded defense courses on topics such as photogrammetry and map-making. According to the student newspaper, the reason for this change was a great need by the government for map-makers and other "sub-professional engineering" positions, which were open to women. The course was offered free of charge but required multiple years of college training or equivalent experience as a pre-requisite and everyone who completed the program was eligible for immediate employment with the National Defense Mapping program. There were 23 women in the very first class. 87 classes followed, with a total of 482 women out of 3619 students overall in the courses in the Engineering, Science, and Management War Training program sponsored by the US Department of Education.

== Cooperative Program in Critical Languages ==
In 1963 Princeton began hosting the Cooperative Program in Critical Languages, which was a project to admit students from 32 participating schools for 2-4 semesters starting after their sophomore year at their home university. The students in the program were expected to return to graduate at their home universities after completion of the program. The project was supported with a Ford Foundation grant. The program offered language and cultural studies in Chinese, Japanese, Arabic, Russian, Persian, and Turkish.

In the first year 35 students applied and 10 were female. Of those, 14 were admitted to the program and 5 were women. Soon after the program started girls began making requests to transfer into the program as seniors rather than after their sophomore year. The girls "requested, begged, and pleaded" to be able to transfer during senior years, and "after discussing among themselves plans for a nude-in in Nassau Hall the administrators decided to reverse decisions" to disallow this practice.

== Female Faculty during Early Coeducation ==
A number of female faculty were hired during the coeducation period.

- Joan S. Girgus
- Carol K. Hall
- Darcy B. Kelley
- Jane E. Menken
- Nancy Weiss Malkiel (née Nancy Weiss)
