= Barbara Engel (historian) =

American historian of Russia

Barbara Alpern Engel
- Born: 28 June 1943 (age 82); New York City, New York
- Education: Valley Stream Central High School; City College of New York (B.A.); Harvard University (M.A.); Columbia University (Ph.D)
- Occupation: Historian

Barbara Alpern Engel (born 28 June 1943) is an American historian of Russia.

== Life ==
Barbara Alpern Engel was born in New York City on 28 June 1943 and graduated from Valley Stream Central High School in 1961. Enrolled in the City College of New York (CUNY), she was one of five women accepted into Princeton University's Cooperative Program in Critical Languages in 1963–64, the first female undergraduates there. Engel graduated from CUNY with a Bachelor of Arts in Russian area studies in 1965 and was awarded a Master of Arts in the same subject two years later by Harvard University. After graduation, she worked for two years as a bilingual secretary and part-time translator for the Smithsonian Astrophysical Observatory in Cambridge, Massachusetts, but felt frustrated as women were not getting promoted there despite possessing the same credentials. Engels enrolled in Columbia University, receiving her Ph.D. in Russian history in 1975. She was appointed assistant professor at Sarah Lawrence College in 1973 and moved to the University of Colorado three years later, where she has remained ever since. She was promoted to associate professor in 1982 and full professor a decade later. Engel was the director of the Central and East European Studies Program from 1993 to 1995 and has also served as the chair of the Department of History.

== Work ==
Engel has written two monographs, most recently Between the Fields and the City: Women, Work and Family in Russia, 1861–1914. She is the recipient of the Chancellor’s Writing Award from the University of Colorado, a winner of the Elizabeth Gee Award for Excellence, a Boulder Faculty Assembly Award Winner for Excellence in Research and Creative Work, and the recipient of a Mortar Board Senior Honor Society Excellence in Teaching Award." She co-edited with Clifford N. Rosenthal, Five Sisters: Women Against the Tsar (1975), the memoirs of five female revolutionaries of the 1870s.
