= Charles S. Haight Jr. =

American judge (born 1930)

Senior Judge of the United States District Court for the Southern District of New York
- Incumbent
- Assumed office September 23, 1995

Judge of the United States District Court for the Southern District of New York
- In office March 29, 1976 – September 23, 1995
- Appointed by: Gerald Ford
- Preceded by: Murray Gurfein
- Succeeded by: Richard C. Casey

Personal details
- Born: Charles Sherman Haight Jr. September 23, 1930 (age 96) New York City, U.S.
- Education: Yale University (BA, LLB)

Charles Sherman Haight Jr. (born September 23, 1930) is an American lawyer who serves as a senior United States district judge of the United States District Court for the Southern District of New York. He has sat by designation in the District of Connecticut since he took senior status.

== Education and career ==
Born in New York City, New York, Haight graduated from Yale University in 1952, where he was a member of Skull and Bones, with a Bachelor of Arts degree and entered Yale Law School the following year, graduating in 1955 with a Bachelor of Laws. Haight gained admission to the New York State bar and in the same year joined the Admiralty and Shipping Department of the Department of Justice as a district court trial attorney. Haight got this job on recommendation from his father Charles Sherman Haight Sr., who was heavily involved in shipping affairs. He left the United States Department of Justice in 1957 to join his father at Haight, Gardner, Poor & Havens as an associate. Haight became a partner of the firm on the death of his father in 1968 and continued the practice of law with them until 1976.

=== Federal judicial service ===
Haight was nominated by President Gerald Ford on March 2, 1976, to a seat on the United States District Court for the Southern District of New York vacated by Judge Murray Gurfein. He was confirmed by the United States Senate on March 26, 1976, and received his commission on March 29, 1976. He assumed senior status on September 23, 1995. Since assuming senior status, he has sat by designation with the United States District Court for the District of Connecticut. Haight took inactive senior status on May 19, 2025.

== Notable cases ==
Haight put Mutulu Shakur in prison for his involvement in a 1981 bank robbery that led to three deaths. In 2020, he denied him compassionate release despite Shakur's terminal cancer and record as a prisoner and mentor. Haight told Shakur — the stepfather of rapper Tupac Shakur — that he was not sick enough. He told Shakur to come back when he was closer to death.

In senior status, a case that spanned from 2002 to 2003 reduced restrictions in police surveillance, which he had imposed himself in 1985 under the Handschu guidelines, even when there is no evidence of criminal offence (). Since March 2007, Haight has revisited his 2003 order, which was made in the antiterrorism climate after 9/11.

== Other service ==
Haight was a director of the Kennedy Child Study Center; advisory trustee of the American-Scandinavian Foundation (Chairman, 1970–1976); manager of the Havens Fund; member of the Journal of Maritime Law and Commerce's editorial board; and a White House Fellow (1991–92).

== See also ==
- List of United States federal judges by longevity of service

== Sources ==
Legal offices
Preceded by Murray Gurfein	Judge of the United States District Court for the Southern District of New York; 1976–1995	Succeeded by Richard C. Casey
