= Darcy Kelley =

American neurobiologist

Darcy B. Kelley
- Born: November 29, 1948 (age 77); New York, NY
- Education: Barnard College (BA); Rockefeller University (PhD)
- Scientific career
- Fields: Neuroscience
- Workplaces: Columbia University

Darcy Brisbane Kelley (born November 29, 1948), is an American neurobiologist and currently a Weintraub and HHMI Professor in the Department of Biological Sciences at Columbia University. She is also Co-Director of Columbia’s Graduate Program in Neurobiology and Behavior and Editor of Developmental Neurobiology, and well known for her contributions to neuroethology, particularly the neural control of vocalization in Xenopus and the cellular and molecular mechanisms of sexually differentiated acoustic communication.

== Early life ==
Darcy Kelley was born in New York City to Elinor S. Brisbane and Solon C. Kelley III and grew up off of East End Ave; she graduated from the Chapin School in 1966. Kelley spent her summers on Cape Small in Maine acquiring a life-long interest in drama until 1964 when she participated in an NSF summer program on the biological basis of behavior at Grinnell College in Iowa. She has said the summer was “determinative event; before that I wanted to be in medicine and after that I wanted to be a scientist.”

== Education and positions ==
Kelley received her B.A. in Psychology and Biology from Barnard College in 1970 and her Ph.D. from Rockefeller University (D.W. Pfaff) in 1975 where she held NSF and ARCS Foundation fellowships. Kelley then joined Fernando Nottebohm’s laboratory as an NIH postdoctoral fellow to investigate the neural underpinnings of song in canaries from 1975–1977. After a brief stint as Assistant Professor at Rockefeller, she moved to Princeton University as a faculty member in Psychology. She then joined the faculty of Biological Sciences at Columbia University as a tenured Associate Professor in 1982 and was appointed Professor in 1987. She is a Howard Hughes Medical Institute Professor (2002) and holds the Harold Weintraub chair in Biological Sciences (2010). Kelley co-directed the Neural Systems and Behavior course at the Marine Biological Laboratory (1985 – 1989) and has served as Trustee of the Marine Biological Laboratory (MBL), the Wenner-Gren Foundation, and the American Association of Colleges and Universities. She is currently Scientific Advisor to the Sloan Foundation Ensemble Theater program, the University of the People and the graduate program in Neuroscience of the Champalimaud Institute in Lisbon, Portugal.

== Research ==
The Kelley Lab studies the anuran Xenopus laevis and other species in this genus, to understand how the nervous system processes and produces acoustic communication, how sex differences in the production and reception of vocal signals arise and how auditory and vocal circuits evolve. This research program was supported by long-term funding from the NIH (NS23684), including two Javits awards. Current research focuses on the genetic basis for species differences in vocal communication (in collaboration with the Bendesky lab) and is supported by a Columbia RISE grant. Research from the Kelley lab has shown that the vocal motor circuit in the hindbrain is sexually differentiated due to the action of testicular androgens, that these hormones control myogenesis and chondrogenesis in the vocal organ, the larynx, and that the greater sensitivity of females to the dominant frequencies in calls of male conspecifics arises, at least in part, from the action of their own androgens on primary auditory neurons. Her laboratory and those of former trainees/collaborators developed two ex vivo preparations (brain and larynx) that “sing in the dish”, facilitating cellular and molecular analyses of the origins of sex, species differences in vocal signaling and the ability to study the evolution of sensory and motor circuits that support behaviors that contribute to speciation.

== Awards and honors ==
- Member, American Academy of Arts and Sciences 2017
- Fellow, International Society for Neuroethology 2014
- Harold Weintraub Chair in Biological Sciences, 2010
- HHMI Professor, 2002
- Society for Neuroethology, Plenary Lecturer 2001
- University of Arizona, Dist. Lecturer in Developmental Neuroscience 1999
- Scholar-in-Residence, Smithsonian Tropical Research Station, BCI, Panama 1999
- Javits Neuroscience Investigator Award, NIH 1995 - 2002
- Phi Beta Kappa Visiting Scholar 1996-97
- Society for Neuroscience, Special Lecturer 1995
- Society for Developmental Psychobiology, Wiley Distinguished Lecturer 1992
- Fellow, American Association for the Advancement of Science 1989
- Columbia University Director of Doctoral Program in Neurobiology and Behavior 1995
- Javits Neuroscience Investigator Award, NIH 1988 - 1995
- Research Career Development Award, NIH 1981 - 1986
- Alfred P. Sloan Foundation Research Fellowship in Neuroscience 1978 - 1981
- Rockefeller Scholar, the ARCS Foundation 1974
- National Science Foundation Graduate Fellowship 1970 - 1973
- Danforth Foundation Graduate Fellowship 1970
- Grace Potter Rice Graduate Fellowship, Barnard College 1970
- A.B. magna cum laude, Phi Beta Kappa 1970

== Key papers ==
- Kwong-Brown, U., Tobias, M., Elias, D., Hall, I., Elemans, C., Kelley, D.B. (2019) The return to water in ancestral Xenopus was accompanied by a novel mechanism for producing and shaping vocal signals.
- Barkan, C.L, Kelley, D.B. and Zornik, E. (2018). Premotor neuron evolution reflects divergent vocal behaviors, Journal of Neuroscience, 38, 5325 – 5327.
- Leininger, E.C. and Kelley, D.B. 2013. Distinct neural and neuromuscular strategies underlie independent evolution of simplified advertisement calls. Proc. R. Soc. B, 280 no. 1756: 20122639.
- Yang, E-J., Nasipak, B.Y. and Kelley, D.B. 2007. Direct action of gonadotropin in brain integrates behavioral and reproductive functions. PNAS, 104, 2477 - 2482.
- Tobias, M.L., Viswanathan, S. and Kelley, D.B. 1998. Rapping, a female receptive call, initiates male/female duets in the South African clawed frog, Proc. Natl. Acad. Sci., 95:1870 - 1875.
- Kelley, D.B. 1980. Auditory and vocal nuclei of frog brain concentrate sex hormones. Science 207. 553 -555.

== Other selected publications ==
- Darcy B. Kelley, Irene H. Ballagh, Charlotte L. Barkan, Andres Bendesky, Taffeta M. Elliott, Ben J. Evans, Ian C. Hall, Ursula Kwong-Brown, Young Mi Kwon, Emilie Perez, Heather Rhodes, Avelyne Villain, Ayako Yamaguchi, Erik Zornik 2020. Generation, coordination and evolution of neural circuits for vocal communication. Journal of Neuroscience, 40, 22 – 36.
- Hall, I.C., Kwong-Brown, U., Woolley, S.M.N and Kelley, D.B. 2016. Sex differences and endocrine regulation of auditory-evoked, neural responses in African clawed frogs (Xenopus). J. Comp. Physiol. A, 202, 17-34.
- Tobias, M.L., Korsh, J. and Kelley, D.B. 2014. Evolution of male and female release calls in Xenopus, Behaviour, 148, 519 - 549.
- Hall, I., Ballagh, I. and Kelley, D.B. 2013. The Xenopus amygdala mediates socially appropriate vocal communication signals. J. Neurosci. 33: 14543 - 14548
- Elliott, T.M., Christensen-Dalsgaard, J., and Kelley, D.B. 2011. Temporally selective processing of communication signals by auditory midbrain neurons, J. Neurophysiol., 105, 1620 – 1632.
- Zornik, E. and Kelley, D.B. 2008. Regulation of respiratory and vocal motor pools in the isolated brain of Xenopus laevis J. Neurosci., 28, 612 - 621.
- Vignal, C. and Kelley, D. 2007. Significance of temporal and spectral acoustic cues for sexual recognition in Xenopus laevis. Proceedings of the Royal Society B, 274, 479 - 488.
- Tobias, M.L., O'Hagan, R., Horng, S.H. and Kelley, D.B. 2004. Vocal communication between male Xenopus laevis; behavioral context and sexual state. Animal Behaviour. 67, 353 – 365.
- Brahic, C.J. and Kelley, D.B. 2003. Vocal circuitry in Xenopus laevis; telencephalon to laryngeal motor neurons. J. Comp. Neurol. 464:115-130.
- Yamaguchi, A. and Kelley, D.B. 2000. Generating sexually differentiated vocal patterns: laryngeal nerve and EMG recordings from vocalizing male and female African clawed frogs (Xenopus laevis). J. Neurosci., 20: 1559 - 1567.
- Thornton, J. and Kelley, D.B. 1998. Evolution of the androgen receptor: structure-function implications. BioEssays, 20, 860 - 869.
- Pérez, J. and Kelley, D. 1996. Trophic effects of androgen: receptor expression and the survival of laryngeal motor neurons after axotomy, J. Neurosci. 16: 6625 - 6633.
- Robertson, J. and Kelley, D. 1996. Thyroid hormone controls the onset of androgen sensitivity in the developing larynx of Xenopus laevis, Dev. Biol.,176, 108 - 123.
- Catz, D., Fischer, L. and Kelley, D. 1995. Androgen regulation of a laryngeal-specific myosin heavy chain isoform whose expression is sexually differentiated, Dev. Biol., 171, 448 - 457.
- Tobias, M., Marin, M. and Kelley, D. 1993. The roles of sex, innervation and androgen in laryngeal muscle fibers of Xenopus laevis, J. Neurosci. 13, 324 - 331.
- Fischer, L., Catz, D. and Kelley, D. 1993. An androgen receptor mRNA isoform associated with hormone-induced cell proliferation, PNAS, 90, 8254 - 8258.
- Sassoon, D., Segil, N. and Kelley, D.B. 1986. Androgen-induced myogenesis and chondrogenesis in the larynx of Xenopus laevis . Dev. Biol. 113, 135 -145.
- Tobias, M. and Kelley, D. 1987. Vocalizations of a sexually dimorphic isolated larynx: Peripheral constraints on behavioral expression. J. Neurosci. 7, 3191 -3197.
