= George Novack =

American Marxist theoretician, editor, and activist

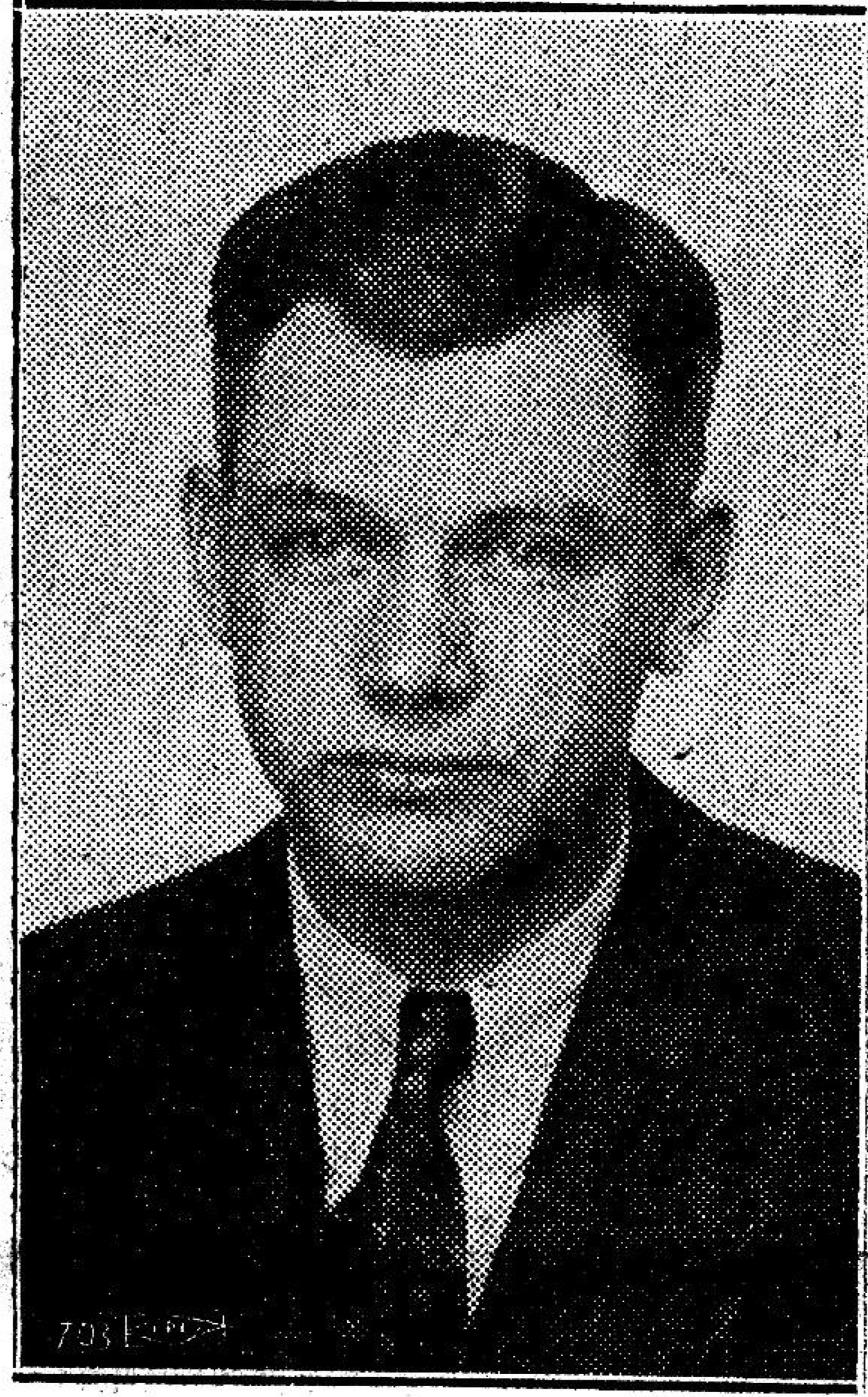
Novack in 1949

George Novack (August 5, 1905, Boston, Massachusetts – July 30, 1992, New York City) was an American Marxist theoretician, editor, and activist.

== Biography ==
Novack attended Harvard University for five years, though without earning a degree, and was on a successful track in the publishing business when the beginning of the Great Depression radicalized him. He joined the Trotskyist movement (Communist League of America) in 1933, along with his first wife Elinor Rice, and was an elected member of the National Committee of the Socialist Workers Party (SWP) from 1940 to 1973.

In 1937-40, Novack served as the secretary of the American Committee for the Defence of Leon Trotsky. This body initiated the celebrated 1937 Dewey Commission that inquired into the charges made against Trotsky in the Moscow show trials, and found them to have been a complete frame-up. He played a major role in the defense campaign for the 18 SWP leaders imprisoned in World War II under the Smith Act.

Novack remained a member of the SWP until his death, although he withdrew from regular political activity after the death of his second wife, Evelyn Reed, in 1979, living quietly in a New York senior citizens' home.

== Work ==
Novack produced a number of books on various aspects of Marxism. His work largely focused on presenting Marxist concepts in an accessible fashion, with major works on Dialectics, Historical materialism, and alienation. He also wrote a number of volumes explaining the intersections and differences between Marxism and other schools of Philosophy, including Analytic philosophy, Empiricism, Humanism, Existentialism, and Pragmatism.

== Bibliography ==
- Novack, George (1942), Introduction to the Logic Of Marxism, New York: Pathfinder Press
- Novack, George (1965), The Origins of Materialism, New York: Pathfinder Press
- Novack, George (1969), Empiricism and its Evolution: A Marxist View, New York: Pathfinder Press
- Novack, George (1969), Revolutionary Dynamics of Women's Liberation, New York: Pathfinder Press
- Novack, George (1970), Genocide Against the Indians, New York: Pathfinder Press
- Novack, George (1971), Democracy and Revolution, New York: Pathfinder Press
- Novack, George (1972), Understanding History: Marxist Essays, New York: Pathfinder Press
- Novack, George (1973), Humanism and Socialism, New York: Pathfinder Press
- Novack, George and Mandel, Ernest (1973), The Marxist Theory of Alienation, 2nd ed., New York: Pathfinder Press
- Novack, George (1975), Pragmatism versus Marxism: An appraisal of John Dewey's philosophy, New York: Pathfinder Press
- Novack, George (1976), America's Revolutionary Heritage, New York: Pathfinder Press
- Novack, George (1978), Polemics in Marxist Philosophy, New York: Pathfinder Press
