= Richard C. Casey =

American judge (1933–2007)

Richard Conway Casey

Judge of the United States District Court for the Southern District of New York
- In office October 24, 1997 – March 22, 2007
- Appointed by: Bill Clinton
- Preceded by: Charles S. Haight Jr.
- Succeeded by: Cathy Seibel

Personal details
- Born: Richard Conway Casey; January 19, 1933 Ithaca, New York, U.S.
- Died: March 22, 2007 (aged 74)
- Education: College of the Holy Cross (BS); Georgetown University (LLB)

Richard Conway Casey (January 19, 1933 – March 22, 2007) was an American lawyer who served as a United States district judge of the United States District Court for the Southern District of New York from 1997 to 2007. Casey gained national prominence for his unusual personal characteristics, such as being completely blind throughout his federal service and for his aggressive questioning during a 2004 trial considering the constitutionality of the Partial-Birth Abortion Ban Act of 2003.

== Early life and education ==
Casey was born on January 19, 1933, in Ithaca, New York. He graduated from the College of the Holy Cross in Worcester, Massachusetts, with a Bachelor of Science in political science in 1955. As an undergraduate at Holy Cross, he was a member of the Knights of Columbus and wrote a senior thesis on the judicial philosophy of Chief Justice Fred Vinson. He was also in the Naval Reserve Officers Training Corps (ROTC) while at Holy Cross.

After graduation, Casey earned his Bachelor of Laws from the Georgetown University Law Center in 1958. He then joined the United States Army (1958; 1961–1962) and the New York Army National Guard (1958–61). He went to basic training at Fort Dix, New Jersey as a private and then served in the New York National Guard at the 142nd Tank Battalion in Freeport, New York. At Georgetown, Casey was particularly influenced by prominent lawyer Edward Bennett Williams.

After law school, Casey worked as a legal investigator for the New York County District Attorney's office before becoming an Assistant United States Attorney for the Southern District of New York (1959–1963). From 1963 to 1964, he served as counsel for the Special Commission of the State of New York where he helped prosecute public corruption cases. From 1964 until his nomination in 1997, Casey worked in private practice with the New York City law firm of Brown & Wood.

== Federal judicial service ==
Casey was a United States District Judge of the United States District Court for the Southern District of New York. Casey was nominated by President Bill Clinton on July 16, 1997, to a seat vacated by Charles S. Haight, Jr. He was confirmed by the United States Senate on October 21, 1997, and received commission on October 24, 1997. He died on March 22, 2007.

== Blindness ==
In 1964, Casey was diagnosed with retinitis pigmentosa. His condition deteriorated into total blindness in 1987. His blindness does not seem to have slowed his career or personal ambition. At his Senate confirmation hearing, Casey expressed confidence in his ability to effectively judge the credibility of witnesses despite his loss of sight. He used a guide dog in court, and he was assisted by computers that read documents aloud.

A Catholic, Casey initially struggled with his blindness and was inspired by a pilgrimage to the Sanctuary of Our Lady of Lourdes. In 1999, Casey travelled to Rome to meet Pope John Paul II and accept the Blessed Hyacinth Cormier, O.P., Medal for "outstanding leadership in the promotion of Gospel Values in the field of justice and ethics".

== Notable cases ==
Casey sentenced Gambino crime family boss Peter Gotti to 25 years in prison on July 28, 2005, seven months after a federal jury found Gotti guilty of conspiring to murder government informant and former Gambino underboss Sammy Gravano. Gotti had earlier been convicted by United States District Court for the Eastern District of New York judge Frederic Block for money laundering and racketeering.

=== NAF v. Ashcroft ===
Casey presided over one of the three constitutional challenges to the 2003 Partial-Birth Abortion Ban Act, National Abortion Federation v. Ashcroft. A coalition led by NAF argued that the statute was unconstitutional under the Supreme Court's 2000 decision in Stenberg v. Carhart because the Act explicitly excluded a "health exception". The Bush administration argued that the courts should defer to a congressional finding of fact that this particular abortion procedure is never medically necessary to protect the health of a mother.

Casey had granted a temporary restraining order prohibiting enforcement of the Act on November 6, 2003, the day after it was signed into law. The trial began on March 29, 2004, and lasted 16 days.

Casey made headlines throughout the trial by his aggressive questioning. He repeatedly asked witnesses—mostly doctors who perform abortions—about the possibility that fetuses feel pain during abortion, and whether patients are truly informed of that possibility. For example, the following is from an exchange during the redirect examination of Dr. Timothy Johnson:

THE COURT: When you describe the possibilities available to a woman do you describe in detail what the intact D&E or the partial birth abortion involves?

THE WITNESS: Since I don't do that procedure I wouldn't have described it.
THE COURT: Did you ever participate with another doctor describing it to a woman considering such an abortion?
THE WITNESS: Yes. And the description would be, I would think, descriptive of what was going to be, what was going to happen; the description.
THE COURT: Including sucking the brain out of the skull?
THE WITNESS: I don't think we would use those terms. I think we would probably use a term like 'decompression of the skull' or 'reducing the contents of the skull'.

THE COURT: Make it nice and palatable so that they wouldn't understand what it's all about?

— Exchange between Judge Richard Casey and Dr. Timothy Johnson, NAF v. Ashcroft trial transcript, pp. 514-515.

On August 26, 2004, Casey entered a judgment declaring the Partial-Birth Abortion Ban Act unconstitutional, in deference to Supreme Court precedent, but also condemning the procedure as "gruesome, brutal, barbaric and uncivilized".

The Bush administration appealed to the Second Circuit Court of Appeals, which affirmed the judgment. In a related case, Gonzales v. Carhart, the Supreme Court reversed a similar Eighth Circuit Court of Appeals decision and upheld the federal Partial-Birth Abortion Ban Act as constitutional, at least on a facial challenge.

== See also ==
- List of first minority male lawyers and judges in the United States
- List of first minority male lawyers and judges in New York

Legal offices
Preceded by Charles S. Haight Jr.	Judge of the United States District Court for the Southern District of New York; 1997–2007	Succeeded by Cathy Seibel
