= List of Jewish American jurists =

This is a list of notable Jewish American jurists. For other famous Jewish Americans, see Lists of American Jews.

== Supreme Court of the United States ==
Justice		State (Note: State of residence at the time of appointment. For example, in 1971, Rehnquist was appointed from Arizona, but in 1986, when elevated to chief justice, he was appointed from Virginia.)	Position	Succeeded	Date confirmed (vote)	Tenure	Tenure length (Note: The start date given for each justice is the day the justice took the prescribed judicial oath of office, with the end date being the date of the justice's death, resignation, or retirement.)	Nominated by
67	Louis Brandeis (1856–1941)	MA	Associate justice	J. Lamar	June 1, 1916 (47–22)	June 5, 1916 – February 13, 1939 (retired)	22 years, 253 days	Woodrow Wilson
75	Benjamin N. Cardozo (1870–1938)	NY	Associate justice	Holmes	February 24, 1932 (acclamation)	March 14, 1932 – July 9, 1938 (died)	6 years, 117 days	Herbert Hoover
78	Felix Frankfurter (1882–1965)	MA	Associate justice	Cardozo	January 17, 1939 (acclamation)	January 30, 1939 – August 28, 1962 (retired)	23 years, 210 days	Franklin D. Roosevelt
94	Arthur Goldberg (1908–1990)	IL	Associate justice	Frankfurter	September 25, 1962 (acclamation)	October 1, 1962 – July 25, 1965 (Resigned)	2 years, 300 days	John F. Kennedy
95	Abe Fortas (1910–1982)	TN	Associate justice	Goldberg	August 11, 1965 (acclamation)	October 4, 1965 – May 14, 1969 (Resigned)	3 years, 222 days	Lyndon B. Johnson
107	Ruth Bader Ginsburg (1933–2020)	NY	Associate justice	B. White	August 3, 1993 (96–3)	August 10, 1993 – September 18, 2020 (died)	27 years, 39 days	Bill Clinton
108	Stephen Breyer (born 1938)	MA	Associate justice	Blackmun	July 29, 1994 (87–9)	August 3, 1994 – June 30, 2022 (retired)	27 years, 331 days	Bill Clinton
112	Elena Kagan (born 1960)	MA	Associate justice	Stevens	August 5, 2010 (63–37)	August 7, 2010 – Incumbent	16 years, 100 days (Note: As of November 15, 2026.)	Barack Obama

== United States courts of appeals ==
#	Judge	Circuit	State	Began active service	Ended active service	Ended senior status	Reason for termination	Appointed by
1	Julian Mack	Second	IL	July 1, 1929	September 6, 1940	September 5, 1943	death	Taft
1	Julian Mack	Sixth	IL	July 1, 1929	June 30, 1930	—	reassigned solely to Second Cir.	Taft
1	Julian Mack	Seventh	IL	January 31, 1911	July 1, 1929	—	reassigned to Second Cir. and Sixth Cir.	Taft
2	Julius Marshuetz Mayer	Second	NY	October 5, 1921	July 31, 1924	—	resignation	Harding
3	Jerome Frank	Second	NY	March 27, 1941	January 13, 1957	—	death	F. Roosevelt
4	Harry Ellis Kalodner	Third	PA	July 27, 1946	October 3, 1969	March 15, 1977	death	Truman
5	David L. Bazelon	D.C.	DC	October 21, 1949	June 30, 1979	February 19, 1993	death	Truman
6	Simon Sobeloff	Fourth	MD	July 18, 1956	December 31, 1970	July 11, 1973	death	Eisenhower
7	Phillip Forman	Third	NJ	September 10, 1959	March 31, 1961	August 17, 1978	death	Eisenhower
8	Irving Kaufman	Second	NY	September 22, 1961	July 1, 1987	February 1, 1992	death	Kennedy
9	Abraham Lincoln Freedman	Third	PA	July 2, 1964	March 13, 1971	—	death	Johnson
10	Harold Leventhal	D.C.	DC	April 7, 1965	November 20, 1979	—	death	Johnson
11	Wilfred Feinberg	Second	NY	March 7, 1966	January 31, 1991	July 31, 2014	death	Johnson
12	Irving Loeb Goldberg	Fifth	TX	July 22, 1966	January 31, 1980	February 11, 1995	death	Johnson
13	Leonard I. Garth	Third	NJ	August 6, 1973	June 30, 1986	September 22, 2016	death	Nixon
14	Murray Gurfein	Second	NY	August 27, 1974	December 16, 1979	—	death	Ford
15	Alvin Benjamin Rubin	Fifth	LA	September 19, 1977	July 1, 1989	June 11, 1991	death	Carter
16	Phyllis A. Kravitch	Fifth	GA	March 23, 1979	October 1, 1981	—	reassigned to Eleventh Cir.	Carter
16	Phyllis A. Kravitch	Eleventh	GA	October 1, 1981	December 31, 1996	June 15, 2017	death	Carter
17	Jon O. Newman	Second	CT	June 12, 1979	July 1, 1997	—	—	Carter
18	Dolores Sloviter	Third	PA	June 21, 1979	June 21, 2013	October 12, 2022	death	Carter
19	Abner Mikva	D.C.	DC	September 26, 1979	September 19, 1994	—	resignation	Carter
20	Harry Pregerson	Ninth	CA	November 2, 1979	December 11, 2015	November 25, 2017	death	Carter
21	Ruth Bader Ginsburg	D.C.	DC	June 30, 1980	August 9, 1993	—	elevation to Supreme Court	Carter
22	Stephen Breyer	First	MA	December 10, 1980	August 3, 1994	—	elevation to Supreme Court	Carter
23	Richard Posner	Seventh	IL	December 1, 1981	September 2, 2017	—	retirement	Reagan
24	Edward R. Becker	Third	PA	December 3, 1981	May 4, 2003	May 19, 2006	death	Reagan
25	Joel Flaum	Seventh	IL	May 5, 1983	November 30, 2020	December 4, 2024	death	Reagan
27	Roger Miner	Second	NY	July 22, 1985	January 1, 1997	February 18, 2012	death	Reagan
28	Laurence Silberman	D.C.	DC	October 28, 1985	November 1, 2000	October 2, 2022	death	Reagan
29	Alex Kozinski	Ninth	CA	November 7, 1985	December 18, 2017	—	resignation	Reagan
30	Douglas H. Ginsburg	D.C.	DC	October 14, 1986	October 14, 2011	—	—	Reagan
31	Bruce M. Selya	First	RI	October 14, 1986	December 31, 2006	February 22, 2025	death	Reagan
32	Morton Ira Greenberg	Third	NJ	March 23, 1987	June 30, 2000	January 28, 2021	death	Reagan
34	Robert Cowen	Third	NJ	November 9, 1987	September 4, 1998	—	—	Reagan
35	Jacques L. Wiener Jr.	Fifth	LA	March 12, 1990	September 30, 2010	—	—	G.H.W. Bush
36	Andrew Kleinfeld	Ninth	AK	September 16, 1991	June 12, 2010	November 7, 2025	death	G.H.W. Bush
37	Michael Boudin	First	MA	May 26, 1992	June 1, 2013	December 15, 2021	retirement	G.H.W. Bush
38	Norman H. Stahl	First	NH	June 30, 1992	April 16, 2001	April 8, 2023	death	G.H.W. Bush
39	Ilana Rovner	Seventh	IL	August 17, 1992	Incumbent	—	—	G.H.W. Bush
40	Guido Calabresi	Second	CT	July 21, 1994	July 21, 2009	—	—	Clinton
41	Merrick Garland	D.C.	DC	March 20, 1997	March 11, 2021	—	resignation	Clinton
42	Barry G. Silverman	Ninth	AZ	February 4, 1998	October 11, 2016	—	—	Clinton
43	Susan P. Graber	Ninth	OR	April 1, 1998	December 15, 2021	—	—	Clinton
44	Rosemary S. Pooler	Second	NY	June 3, 1998	March 23, 2022	August 10, 2023	death	Clinton
45	Robert D. Sack	Second	NY	June 16, 1998	August 6, 2009	—	—	Clinton
46	Robert Katzmann	Second	NY	July 14, 1999	January 21, 2021	June 9, 2021	death	Clinton
47	Ronald M. Gould	Ninth	WA	November 22, 1999	Incumbent	—	—	Clinton
48	Sharon Prost	Federal	DC	September 24, 2001	Incumbent	—	—	G.W. Bush
49	Harris Hartz	Tenth	NM	December 10, 2001	Incumbent	—	—	G.W. Bush
50	Michael Chertoff	Third	NJ	June 10, 2003	February 15, 2005	—	resignation	G.W. Bush
51	Sandra Segal Ikuta	Ninth	CA	June 23, 2006	Incumbent	—	—	G.W. Bush
52	Helene White	Sixth	MI	August 8, 2008	June 13, 2022	—	—	G.W. Bush
53	Evan Wallach	Federal	DC	November 18, 2011	May 31, 2021	—	—	Obama
54	Andrew D. Hurwitz	Ninth	AZ	June 27, 2012	October 3, 2022	—	—	Obama
55	Robert E. Bacharach	Tenth	OK	February 28, 2013	Incumbent	—	—	Obama
56	Patty Shwartz	Third	NJ	April 10, 2013	Incumbent	—	—	Obama
57	Michelle Friedland	Ninth	CA	April 29, 2014	Incumbent	—	—	Obama
58	David J. Barron	First	MA	May 23, 2014	Incumbent	—	—	Obama
59	Robin S. Rosenbaum	Eleventh	FL	June 2, 2014	Incumbent	—	—	Obama
60	Pamela Harris	Fourth	MD	July 29, 2014	Incumbent	—	—	Obama
61	David Stras	Eighth	MN	January 31, 2018	Incumbent	—	—	Trump
62	Neomi Rao	D.C.	DC	March 18, 2019	Incumbent	—	—	Trump
63	Daniel Bress	Ninth	CA	July 26, 2019	Incumbent	—	—	Trump
64	Steven Menashi	Second	NY	November 14, 2019	Incumbent	—	—	Trump
65	Robert J. Luck	Eleventh	FL	November 19, 2019	Incumbent	—	—	Trump
66	Veronica S. Rossman	Tenth	CO	September 28, 2021	Incumbent	—	—	Biden
67	Alison Nathan	Second	NY	March 30, 2022	Incumbent	—	—	Biden
68	Maria Araújo Kahn	Second	CT	March 10, 2023	Incumbent	—	—	Biden
69	Julie Rikelman	First	MA	June 23, 2023	Incumbent	—	—	Biden
70	Rachel Bloomekatz	Sixth	OH	July 20, 2023	Incumbent	—	—	Biden
71	Nicole Berner	Fourth	MD	March 19, 2024	Incumbent	—	—	Biden
72	Rebecca Taibleson	Seventh	WI	November 3, 2025	Incumbent	—	—	Trump
73	Matthew Schwartz	Second	NY	July 24, 2026	Incumbent	—	—	Trump

== United States district courts ==
- Ronnie Abrams, judge of the United States District Court for the Southern District of New York (2012–present)
- Harold A. Ackerman, senior judge of the United States District Court for the District of New Jersey (1994–2009), judge of the United States District Court for the District of New Jersey (1979–1994)
- Lynn S. Adelman, judge of the United States District Court for the Eastern District of Wisconsin (1997–present)
- Roy Altman, judge of the United States District Court for the Southern District of Florida (2019–present)
- Sidney Aronovitz, senior judge of the United States District Court for the Southern District of Florida (1988–1997), judge of the United States District Court for the Southern District of Florida (1976–1988)
- Marvin Aspen, senior judge of the United States District Court for the Northern District of Illinois (2002–present), chief judge of the United States District Court for the Northern District of Illinois (1995–2002), judge of the United States District Court for the Northern District of Illinois (1979–2002)
- Nancy Atlas, senior judge of the United States District Court for the Southern District of Texas (2014–2022), judge of the United States District Court for the Southern District of Texas (1994–2014)
- Harold Baer Jr., senior judge of the United States District Court for the Southern District of New York (2004–2014), judge of the United States District Court for the Southern District of New York (1994–2004)
- Peter Beer, senior judge of the United States District Court for the Eastern District of Louisiana (1994–2018), judge of the United States District Court for the Eastern District of Louisiana (1979–1994)
- Richard M. Berman, senior judge of the United States District Court for the Southern District of New York (2011–present), judge of the United States District Court for the Southern District of New York (1998–2011)
- Alexander Bicks, judge of the United States District Court for the Southern District of New York (1954–1963)
- Norman William Black, senior judge of the United States District Court for the Southern District of Texas (1996–1997), chief judge of the United States District Court for the Southern District of Texas (1992–1996), judge of the United States District Court for the Southern District of Texas (1979–1996)
- Alan N. Bloch, senior judge of the United States District Court for the Western District of Pennsylvania (1997–2024), judge of the United States District Court for the Western District of Pennsylvania (1979–1997)
- Frederic Block, senior judge of the United States District Court for the Eastern District of New York (2005–present), judge of the United States District Court for the Eastern District of New York (1994–2005)
- Beth Bloom, judge of the United States District Court for the Southern District of Florida (2014–present)
- Mosher Joseph Blumenfeld, senior judge of the United States District Court for the District of Connecticut (1977–1988), chief judge of the United States District Court for the District of Connecticut (1971–1974), district judge of the United States District Court for the District of Connecticut (1961–1977)
- Stanley Blumenfeld, Judge of the United States District Court for the Central District of California (2020–present)
- Charles Breyer, senior judge of the United States District Court for the Northern District of California (2011–present), judge of the United States District Court for the Northern District of California (1997–2011)
- Stanley Brotman, senior judge of the United States District Court for the District of New Jersey (1990–2014), judge of the United States District Court for the District of New Jersey (1975–1990)
- Naomi Reice Buchwald, senior judge of the United States District Court for the Southern District of New York (2012–present), judge of the United States District Court for the Southern District of New York (1999–2012)
- Allison D. Burroughs, district judge of the United States District Court for the District of Massachusetts (2014–present)
- Deborah K. Chasanow, senior judge of the United States District Court for the District of Maryland (2014–present), chief judge of the United States District Court for the District of Maryland (2010–2014), judge of the United States District Court for the District of Maryland (1993–2014)
- Robert N. Chatigny, senior judge of the United States District Court for the District of Connecticut (2017–present), chief judge of the United States District Court for the District of Connecticut (2003–2009), judge of the United States District Court for the District of Connecticut (1994–2017)
- Brian Cogan, senior judge of the United States District Court for the Eastern District of New York (2020–present), judge of the United States District Court for the Eastern District of New York (2006–2020)
- Mark Howard Cohen, judge of the United States District Court for the Northern District of Georgia (2014–present)
- Avern Cohn, senior judge of the United States District Court for the Eastern District of Michigan (1999–2022), judge of the United States District Court for the Eastern District of Michigan (1979–1999)
- James I. Cohn, senior judge of the United States District Court for the Southern District of Florida (2016–present), judge of the United States District Court for the Southern District of Florida (2003–2016)
- Florence-Marie Cooper, judge of the United States District Court for the Central District of California (1999–2010)
- Irving Ben Cooper, senior judge of the United States District Court for the Southern District of New York (1972–1996), judge of the United States District Court for the Southern District of New York (1961–1972)
- Susan J. Dlott, senior judge of the United States District Court for the Southern District of Ohio (2018–present), chief judge of the United States District Court for the Southern District of Ohio (2009–2015), judge of the United States District Court for the Southern District of Ohio (1995–2018)
- Jan E. DuBois, senior judge of the United States District Court for the Eastern District of Pennsylvania (2002–2026), judge of the United States District Court for the Eastern District of Pennsylvania (1988–2002)
- David Norton Edelstein, senior judge of the United States District Court for the Southern District of New York (1994–2000), chief judge of the United States District Court for the Southern District of New York (1971–1980), judge of the United States District Court for the Southern District of New York (1951–1994)
- Paul A. Engelmayer, judge of the United States District Court for the Southern District of New York (2011–present)
- Gary Feinerman, judge of the United States District Court for the Northern District of Illinois (2010–present)
- Martin Leach-Cross Feldman, judge of the United States District Court for the Eastern District of Louisiana (1983–2022)
- Sandra J. Feuerstein, senior judge of the United States District Court for the Eastern District of New York (2015–2021), judge of the United States District Court for the Eastern District of New York (2003–2015)
- Sherman Glenn Finesilver, senior judge of the United States District Court for the District of Colorado (1994), chief judge of the United States District Court for the District of Colorado (1982–1994), judge of the United States District Court for the District of Colorado (1971–1974)
- Herbert Allan Fogel, judge of the United States District Court for the Eastern District of Pennsylvania (1973–1978)
- Jeremy Fogel, senior judge of the United States District Court for the Northern District of California (2014–2018), judge of the United States District Court for the Northern District of California (1998–2014)
- Marvin E. Frankel, judge of the United States District Court for the Southern District of New York (1965–1978)
- Emerich B. Freed, district judge of the United States District Court for the Northern District of Ohio (1941–1955)
- Frank Harlan Freedman, senior judge of the United States District Court for the District of Massachusetts (1992–2003), chief judge of the United States District Court for the District of Massachusetts (1986–1992), judge of the United States District Court for the District of Massachusetts (1972–1992)
- Beth Labson Freeman, judge of the United States District Court for the Northern District of California (2014–present)
- Jerome B. Friedman, senior judge of the United States District Court for the Eastern District of Virginia (2010–2011), judge of the United States District Court for the Eastern District of Virginia (1997–2010)
- Paul L. Friedman, senior judge of the United States District Court for the District of Columbia (2010–2011), judge of the United States District Court for the District of Columbia (1997–2010)
- Jesse M. Furman, district judge of the United States District Court for the Southern District of New York (2014–present)
- Nina Gershon, senior judge of the United States District Court for the Eastern District of New York (2008–present), judge of the United States District Court for the Eastern District of New York (1996–2008)
- Nancy Gertner, senior judge of the United States District Court for the District of Massachusetts (2011), judge of the United States District Court for the District of Massachusetts (1994–2011)
- Robert Gettleman, senior judge of the United States District Court for the Northern District of Illinois (2009–present), judge of the United States District Court for the Northern District of Illinois (1994–2009)
- I. Leo Glasser, senior judge of the United States District Court for the Eastern District of New York (1993–present), judge of the United States District Court for the Eastern District of New York (1981–1993)
- Alan Stephen Gold, senior judge of the United States District Court for the Southern District of Florida (2011–present), judge of the United States District Court for the Southern District of Florida (1997–2011)
- Mitchell S. Goldberg, judge of the United States District Court for the Eastern District of Pennsylvania (2008–present)
- Mark A. Goldsmith, judge of the United States District Court for the Eastern District of Michigan (2010–present)
- Louis Earl Goodman, chief judge of the United States District Court for the Northern District of California (1958–1961), judge of the United States District Court for the Northern District of California (1942–1961)
- Harold H. Greene, senior judge of the United States District Court for the District of Columbia (1995–2000), judge of the United States District Court for the District of Columbia (1978–1995)
- Steven D. Grimberg, judge of the United States District Court for the Northern District of Georgia (2019–present)
- Lawrence Gubow, judge of the United States District Court for the Eastern District of Michigan (1968–1978)
- Alvin Hellerstein, senior judge of the United States District Court for the Southern District of New York (2011–present), judge of the United States District Court for the Southern District of New York (1998–2011)
- William Bernard Herlands, judge of the United States District Court for the Southern District of New York (1995–1969)
- Irving Hill, senior judge of the United States District Court for the Central District of California (1980–1998), judge of the United States District Court for the Central District of California (1979–1980), judge of the United States District Court for the Central District of California (1966–1980)
- Faith S. Hochberg, judge of the United States District Court for the District of New Jersey (1999–2015)
- Julius Hoffman, senior judge of the United States District Court for the Northern District of Illinois (1972–1982), judge of the United States District Court for the Northern District of Illinois (1953–1972)
- Ellen Lipton Hollander, senior judge of the United States District Court for the District of Maryland (2022–present), judge of the United States District Court for the District of Maryland (2010–2022)
- Alexander Holtzoff, senior judge of the United States District Court for the District of Columbia (1967–1969), judge of the United States District Court for the District of Columbia (1945–1967)
- Beryl Howell, senior judge of the United States District Court for the District of Columbia (2024–present), chief judge of the United States District Court for the District of Columbia (2016–2023), judge of the United States District Court for the District of Columbia (2010–2024)
- Amy Berman Jackson, senior judge of the United States District Court for the District of Columbia (2023–present), judge of the United States District Court for the District of Columbia (2011–2023)
- Lewis A. Kaplan, senior judge of the United States District Court for the Southern District of New York (2011–present), judge of the United States District Court for the Southern District of New York (1994–2011)
- Lawrence K. Karlton, senior judge of the United States District Court for the Eastern District of California (2000–2015), chief judge of the United States District Court for the Eastern District of California (1983–1990), judge of the United States District Court for the Eastern District of California (1979–200)
- David A. Katz, senior judge of the United States District Court for the Northern District of Ohio (2005–2016), judge of the United States District Court for the Northern District of Ohio (1994–2005)
- Bruce William Kauffman, senior judge of the United States District Court for the Eastern District of Pennsylvania (2008–2009), judge of the United States District Court for the Eastern District of Pennsylvania (1997–2008)
- Frank Albert Kaufman, senior judge of the United States District Court for the District of Maryland (1986–1997), chief judge of the United States District Court for the District of Maryland (1981–1986), judge of the United States District Court for the District of Maryland (1966–1986)
- Samuel H. Kaufman, senior judge of the United States District Court for the Southern District of New York (1955–1960), judge of the United States District Court for the Southern District of New York (1948–1955)
- Gladys Kessler, senior judge of the United States District Court for the District of Columbia (2007–present), judge of the United States District Court for the District of Columbia (1994–2007)
- Eric R. Komitee, judge of the United States District Court for the Eastern District of New York (2020–present)
- Edward R. Korman, senior judge of the United States District Court for the Eastern District of New York (2007–present), chief judge of the United States District Court for the Eastern District of New York (2000–2007), judge of the United States District Court for the Eastern District of New York (1985–2007)
- Mark Kravitz, judge of the United States District Court for the District of Connecticut (2003–2012)
- Morris E. Lasker, senior judge of the United States District Court for the Southern District of New York (1983–2009), judge of the United States District Court for the Southern District of New York (1968–1983)
- Robert S. Lasnik, senior judge of the United States District Court for the Western District of Washington (2016–present), chief judge of the United States District Court for the Western District of Washington (2004–2011), judge of the United States District Court for the Western District of Washington (1998–2016)
- Joan A. Lenard, senior judge of the United States District Court for the Southern District of Florida (2017–present), judge of the United States District Court for the Southern District of Florida (1995–2017)
- David F. Levi, chief judge of the United States District Court for the Eastern District of California (2003–2007), judge of the United States District Court for the Eastern District of California (1983–2007)
- Gerald Sanford Levin, judge of the United States District Court for the Northern District of California (1969–1971)
- Theodore Levin, chief judge of the United States District Court for the Eastern District of Michigan (1959–1967), judge of the United States District Court for the Eastern District of Michigan (1946–1970)
- Jon D. Levy, senior judge of the United States District Court for the District of Maine (2024–present), chief judge of the United States District Court for the District of Maine (2019–2024), judge of the United States District Court for the District of Maine (2014–2024)
- Judith E. Levy, judge of the United States District Court for the Eastern District of Michigan (2014–present)
- Lewis J. Liman, judge of the United States District Court for the Southern District of New York (2019–present)
- Sheryl H. Lipman, chief judge of the United States District Court for the Western District of Tennessee (2023–present), judge of the United States District Court for the Western District of Tennessee (2014–present)
- Barbara M. Lynn, senior judge of the United States District Court for the Northern District of Texas (2023–present), chief judge of the United States District Court for the Northern District of Texas (2016–2022), judge of the United States District Court for the Northern District of Texas (1999–2023)
- Samuel Mandelbaum, judge of the United States District Court for the Southern District of New York (1936–1946)
- Abraham Lincoln Marovitz, senior judge of the United States District Court for the Northern District of Illinois (1975–2001), judge of the United States District Court for the Northern District of Illinois (1963–1975)
- Howard Matz, senior judge of the United States District Court for the Central District of California (2011–2013), judge of the United States District Court for the Central District of California (1998–2011)
- Roslynn R. Mauskopf, chief judge of the United States District Court for the Eastern District of New York (2020–2021), judge of the United States District Court for the Eastern District of New York (2007–2024)
- Peter J. Messitte, senior judge of the United States District Court for the District of Maryland (2008–2025), judge of the United States District Court for the District of Maryland (1993–2008)
- Charles Miller Metzner, judge of the United States District Court for the Southern District of New York (1977–2009), judge of the United States District Court for the Southern District of New York (1959–1977)
- Jacob Mishler, senior judge of the United States District Court for the Eastern District of New York (1980–2004), chief judge of the United States District Court for the Eastern District of New York (1969–1980), judge of the United States District Court for the Eastern District of New York (1960–1980)
- Mendon Morrill, judge of the United States District Court for the District of New Jersey (1958–1961)
- Grover M. Moscowitz, district judge of the United States District Court for the Eastern District of New York (1925–1947)
- Barry Ted Moskowitz, senior judge of the United States District Court for the Southern District of California (2019–present), chief Judge of the United States District Court for the Southern District of California (2012–2019), judge of the United States District Court for the Southern District of California (1995–2019)
- Randolph Moss, judge of the United States District Court for the District of Columbia (2014–present)
- Michael S. Nachmanoff, judge of the United States District Court for the Eastern District of Virginia (2021–present)
- Stewart Albert Newblatt, senior judge of the United States District Court for the Eastern District of Michigan (1993–2022), judge of the United States District Court for the Eastern District of Michigan (1979–1993)
- Casper Platt, judge of the United States District Court for the Eastern District of Illinois (1949–1965), chief judge of the United States District Court for the Eastern District of Illinois (1956–1965)
- Milton Pollack, senior judge of the United States District Court for the Southern District of New York (1983–2004), judge of the United States District Court for the Southern District of New York (1967–1983)
- Dan A. Polster, senior judge of the United States District Court for the Northern District of Ohio (2021–present), judge of the United States District Court for the Northern District of Ohio (1998–2021)
- Edmund Port, senior judge of the United States District Court for the Northern District of New York (1976–1986), judge of the United States District Court for the Northern District of New York (1964–1976)
- Dean Pregerson, senior judge of the United States District Court for the Central District of California (2016–present), judge of the United States District Court for the Central District of California (1996–2016)
- Jed S. Rakoff, senior judge of the United States District Court for the Southern District of New York (2010–present), judge of the United States District Court for the Southern District of New York (1996–2010)
- Leo F. Rayfiel, senior judge of the United States District Court for the Eastern District of New York (1966–1978), judge of the United States District Court for the Eastern District of New York (1947–1966)
- Simon H. Rifkind, district judge of the United States District Court for the Southern District of New York (1941–1950)
- Louis Rosenberg, senior judge of the United States District Court for the Western District of Pennsylvania (1976–1999), judge of the United States District Court for the Western District of Pennsylvania (1961–1976)
- Robin L. Rosenberg, judge of the United States District Court for the Southern District of Florida (2014–present)
- Max Rosenn, senior judge of the United States Court of Appeals for the Third Circuit (1981–2006), judge of the United States Court of Appeals for the Third Circuit (1970–1981)
- David Hittner, senior judge of the United States District Court for the Southern District of Texas (2004–present), judge of the United States District Court for the Southern District of Texas (1986–2004)
- Lee H. Rosenthal, senior judge of the United States District Court for the Southern District of Texas (2024–present), chief judge of the United States District Court for the Southern District of Texas (2016–2022), judge of the United States District Court for the Southern District of Texas (1992–2024)
- George Rosling, judge of the United States District Court for the Eastern District of New York (1961–1973)
- Allyne R. Ross, senior judge of the United States District Court for the Eastern District of New York (2011–present), judge of the United States District Court for the Eastern District of New York (1994–2011)
- Barbara Jacobs Rothstein, senior judge of the United States District Court for the Western District of Washington (2011–present), chief judge of the United States District Court for the Western District of Washington (1987–1994), judge of the United States District Court for the Western District of Washington (1980–2011)
- Carl Bernard Rubin, chief judge of the United States District Court for the Southern District of Ohio (1979–1990), judge of the United States District Court for the Southern District of Ohio (1971–1995)
- Julie Rubin, judge of the United States District Court for the District of Maryland (2022–present)
- Lee Rudofsky, judge of the United States District Court for the Eastern District of Arkansas (2019–present)
- Patti B. Saris, senior judge of the United States District Court for the District of Massachusetts (2024–present), chief judge of the United States District Court for the District of Massachusetts (2013–2019), judge of the United States District Court for the District of Massachusetts (1993–2024)
- Shira Scheindlin, senior judge of the United States District Court for the Southern District of New York (2011–2016), judge of the United States District Court for the Southern District of New York (1994–2011)
- Berle M. Schiller, senior judge of the United States District Court for the Eastern District of Pennsylvania (2012–2025), judge of the United States District Court for the Eastern District of Pennsylvania (2000–2012)
- Harvey E. Schlesinger, senior judge of the United States District Court for the Middle District of Florida (2006–present), judge of the United States District Court for the Middle District of Florida (1991–2006)
- Allen G. Schwartz, judge of the United States District Court for the Southern District of New York (1993–2003)
- Charles Schwartz Jr., senior judge of the United States District Court for the Eastern District of Louisiana (1991–2012), judge of the United States District Court for the Eastern District of Louisiana (1976–1991)
- Edward Joseph Schwartz, Senior judge of the United States District Court for the Southern District of California (1982–2000), chief judge of the United States District Court for the Southern District of California (1969–1982), judge of the United States District Court for the Southern District of California (1968–1982)
- Murray Merle Schwartz, senior judge of the United States District Court for the District of Delaware (1989–2013), chief judge of the United States District Court for the District of Delaware (1985–1989), judge of the United States District Court for the District of Delaware (1974–1989)
- Morey Leonard Sear, senior judge of the United States District Court for the Eastern District of Louisiana (2000–2004), chief judge of the United States District Court for the Eastern District of Louisiana (1992–1999), judge of the United States District Court for the Eastern District of Louisiana (1976–2000)
- Norma Levy Shapiro, senior judge of the United States District Court for the Eastern District of Pennsylvania (1998–2016), judge of the United States District Court for the Eastern District of Pennsylvania (1978–1998)
- Michael H. Simon, judge of the United States District Court for the District of Oregon (2011–present)
- George Z. Singal, senior judge of the United States District Court for the District of Maine (2013–present), chief judge of the United States District Court for the District of Maine (2003–2009), judge of the United States District Court for the District of Maine (2000–2013)
- Joel Harvey Slomsky, senior judge of the United States District Court for the Eastern District of Pennsylvania (2018–present), judge of the United States District Court for the Eastern District of Pennsylvania (2008–2018)
- Christina A. Snyder, senior judge of the United States District Court for the Central District of California (2016–present), judge of the United States District Court for the Central District of California (1997–2016)
- Gus J. Solomon, judge of the United States District Court for the District of Oregon (1971–1987), chief judge of the United States District Court for the District of Oregon (1958–1971), judge of the United States District Court for the District of Oregon (1949–1971)
- Arthur Spatt, senior judge of the United States District Court for the Eastern District of New York (2004–2020), judge of the United States District Court for the Eastern District of New York (1989–2004)
- Sidney H. Stein, senior judge of the United States District Court for the Southern District of New York (2010–present), judge of the United States District Court for the Southern District of New York (1995–2010)
- Herbert Jay Stern, judge of the United States District Court for the District of New Jersey (1973–1987)
- Sidney Sugarman, senior judge of the United States District Court for the Southern District of New York (1971–1974), chief judge of the United States District Court for the Southern District of New York (1966–1971), judge of the United States District Court for the Southern District of New York (1949–1971)
- Hubert Irving Teitelbaum, judge of the United States District Court for the Western District of Pennsylvania (1985–1995), chief judge of the United States District Court for the Western District of Pennsylvania (1982–1985), judge of the United States District Court for the Western District of Pennsylvania (1970–1985)
- Amy Totenberg, judge of the United States District Court for the Northern District of Georgia (2011–2021)
- David G. Trager, senior judge of the United States District Court for the Eastern District of New York (2006–2011), judge of the United States District Court for the Eastern District of New York (1993–2006)
- Jacob Trieber, judge of the United States District Court for the Eastern District of Arkansas (1900–1927)
- Robert Joseph Ward, judge of the United States District Court for the Southern District of New York (1991–2003), judge of the United States District Court for the Southern District of New York (1972–1991)
- Jacob Weinberger, senior judge of the United States District Court for the Southern District of California (1958–1974), judge of the United States District Court for the Southern District of California (1946–1958)
- Charles R. Weiner, judge of the United States District Court for the Eastern District of Pennsylvania (1988–2005), judge of the United States District Court for the Eastern District of Pennsylvania (1967–1988)
- Edward Weinfeld, judge of the United States District Court for the Southern District of New York (1950–1988)
- Jack B. Weinstein, senior judge of the United States District Court for the Eastern District of New York (1993–2021), chief judge of the United States District Court for the Eastern District of New York (1980–1988), judge of the United States District Court for the Eastern District of New York (1967–1993)
- Albert Charles Wollenberg, judge of the United States District Court for the Northern District of California (1975–1981), judge of the United States District Court for the Northern District of California (1958–1975)
- Joshua Wolson, judge of the United States District Court for the Eastern District of Pennsylvania (2019–present)
- Charles Edward Wyzanski Jr., judge of the United States District Court for the District of Massachusetts (1971–1986), chief judge of the United States District Court for the District of Massachusetts (1965–1971), judge of the United States District Court for the District of Massachusetts (1941–1971)
- Rya W. Zobel, senior judge of the United States District Court for the District of Massachusetts (2014–present), judge of the United States District Court for the District of Massachusetts (1979–2014)

== Solicitors general ==
- Charles Fried, solicitor general of the United States (1985–1989)
- Daniel Mortimer Friedman, acting solicitor general of the United States (1977)
- Elena Kagan, solicitor general of the United States (2009–2010)
- Philip Perlman, solicitor general of the United States (1947–1952)
- Simon Sobeloff, solicitor general of the United States (1954–1956)
- Barbara Underwood, acting solicitor general of the United States (2001)
- Seth P. Waxman, solicitor general of the United States (1997–2001)

== U.S. attorneys general ==
- Merrick Garland, United States attorney general (2021–2025)
- Edward H. Levi, United States attorney general (1975–1977)
- Michael Mukasey, United States attorney general (2007–2009)
- Jeffrey A. Rosen, acting United States attorney general (2020–2021)

== Confederate attorneys general ==
- Judah P. Benjamin, Confederate States attorney general (1861)

== U.S. attorneys ==
- Geoffrey Berman, United States attorney for the Southern District of New York (2018–2020)
- Richard Blumenthal, United States attorney for the District of Connecticut (1977–1981)
- Adam L. Braverman, United States attorney for the Southern District of California (2017–2019)
- Lev Dassin, acting United States attorney for the Southern District of New York (2008–2009)
- Steve Dettelbach, United States attorney for the Northern District of Ohio (2009–2016)
- David B. Fein, United States attorney for the District of Connecticut (2010–2013)
- Paul J. Fishman, United States attorney for the District of New Jersey (2009–2017)
- Carla B. Freedman, U.S. attorney for the Northern District of New York (2021–2025)
- Rachael A. Honig, acting United States attorney for the District of New Jersey (2021)
- Joel Klein, chancellor of New York City Schools (2002–2011), United States assistant attorney general for the Antitrust Division (1996–2000), law clerk for U.S. Supreme Court Justice Lewis F. Powell Jr.
- David Kustoff, United States attorney for the Western District of Tennessee (2006–2008)
- Mark Lesko, acting U.S. attorney for the Eastern District of New York (2021)
- Harry Litman, U.S. attorney for the Western District of Pennsylvania (1998–2001)
- Robert Morganthau, United States attorney for the Southern District of New York (1961–1970)
- Rod Rosenstein, U.S. attorney for the District of Maryland (2005–2017), United States deputy attorney general (2017–2019)
- Irving Saypol, United States attorney for the Southern District of New York (1941–1951)
- Philip R. Sellinger, U.S. attorney for the District of New Jersey (2021–2025)
- Michael R. Sherwin, acting U.S. attorney for the District of Columbia (2020–2021)
- Audrey Strauss, United States attorney for the Southern District of New York (2020–2021)
- Joyce Vance, United States attorney for the Northern District of Alabama (2009–2017)
- Kenneth L. Wainstein, United States attorney for the District of Columbia (2004–2006)
- Aaron L. Weisman, United States attorney for the District of Rhode Island (2019–2021)
- David C. Weiss, United States attorney for the District of Delaware (2018–present)

== White House counsel ==
- Robert Bauer, White House counsel (2010–2011)
- Myer Feldman, White House counsel (1964–1965)
- Robert Lipshutz, White House counsel (1977–1979)
- Bernard Nussbaum, White House counsel (1993–1994)
- Samuel Rosenman, White House counsel (1943–1946)
- Ed Siskel, White House counsel (2023–2025)
- Ted Sorensen, White House counsel (1961–1964)

== State supreme court justices ==
- Ruth Abrams, associate justice of the Massachusetts Supreme Judicial Court (1978–2000)
- Shirley Abrahamson, chief justice of the Wisconsin Supreme Court (1996–2015), associate justice of the Wisconsin Supreme Court (1976–2019)
- Henry E. Ackerson Jr., associate justice of the Supreme Court of New Jersey (1948–1952)
- Max Baer, chief justice of the Pennsylvania Supreme Court (2021–2022), associate justice of Supreme Court of Pennsylvania (2004–2021)
- Nancy A. Becker, associate justice of the Nevada Supreme Court (1999–2007)
- Carolyn Berger, associate justice of the Delaware Supreme Court (1994–2014)
- Charles C. Bernstein, chief justice of the Arizona Supreme Court (1962–1963, 1967), associate justice of the Arizona Supreme Court (1959–1969)
- Richard H. Bernstein, associate justice of the Michigan Supreme Court (2015–present)
- Charles Breitel, chief judge of the New York Court of Appeals (1974–1978)
- Elissa F. Cadish, associate justice of the Nevada Supreme Court (2019–present)
- Michael Cherry, chief justice of the Nevada Supreme Court (2012–2013, 2017–2018), associate justice of the Nevada Supreme Court (2007–2009)
- Herbert B. Cohen, associate justice of the Pennsylvania Supreme Court (1957–1970)
- William D. Cohen, associate justice of the Vermont Supreme Court (2019–present)
- Raymond Ehrlich, associate justice of the Florida Supreme Court (1981–1990)
- Arthur J. England Jr., chief justice of the Florida Supreme Court (1978–1980), associate justice of the Florida Supreme Court (1975–1981)
- Paul Feinman, associate judge of the New York Court of Appeals (2017–2021)
- Stanley G. Feldman, chief justice of the Arizona Supreme Court (1992–1997), justice of the Arizona Supreme Court (1982–2002)
- Jacob Fuchsberg, associate judge of the New York Court of Appeals (1975–1983)
- Stanley Fuld, chief judge of the New York Court of Appeals (1967–1973), associate judge of the New York Court of Appeals (1946–1966)
- Ralph Gants, chief justice of the Massachusetts Supreme Judicial Court (2014–2020), associate justice of the Massachusetts Supreme Judicial Court (2009–2014)
- Maureen McKenna Goldberg, associate justice of the Rhode Island Supreme Court (1997–present)
- Andrew Gould, associate justice of the Arizona Supreme Court (2016–2021)
- Joshua Groban, associate justice of the Supreme Court of California (2019–present)
- Hattie Leah Henenberg, associate justice of the Supreme Court of Texas (1925)
- Daniel L. Herrmann, associate justice of the Delaware Supreme Court (1965–1968)
- Solomon Heydenfeldt, associate justice of the California Supreme Court (1852–1857)
- Nathan L. Jacobs, associate justice of the New Jersey Supreme Court (1948, 1952–1975)
- Benjamin Kaplan, associate justice of the Massachusetts Supreme Judicial Court (1972–1981)
- Jill Karofsky, associate justice of the Wisconsin Supreme Court (2020–present)
- Joette Katz, associate justice of the Connecticut Supreme Court (1992–2011)
- Judith Kaye, chief judge of the New York Court of Appeals (1993–2008), associate judge of the New York Court of Appeals (1983–1993)
- Robert G. Klein, associate justice of the Supreme Court of Hawaii (1992–2000)
- Gerald Kogan, chief justice of the Florida Supreme Court (1996–1998), associate justice of the Florida Supreme Court (1987–1998)
- Leondra Kruger, associate justice of the California Supreme Court (2015–present)
- Irving Lehman, chief judge of the New York Court of Appeals (1940–1945), associate judge of the New York Court of Appeals (1924–1939)
- Barbara Lenk, acting chief justice of the Massachusetts Supreme Judicial Court (2020), associate justice of the Massachusetts Supreme Judicial Court (2011–2020)
- Jonathan Lippman, chief judge of the New York Court of Appeals (2009–2015)
- David A. Lowy, associate justice of the Massachusetts Supreme Judicial Court (2016–2024)
- Henry A. Lyons, chief justice of California (1852), associate justice of the California Supreme Court (1849–1851)
- Stephen Markman, chief justice of the Michigan Supreme Court (2017–2019), associate justice of the Michigan Supreme Court (1999–2020)
- Bernard Meyer, associate judge of the New York Court of Appeals (1979–1986)
- Lindsey Miller-Lerman, justice of the Nebraska Supreme Court, 2nd Judicial District (1998–present)
- Franklin J. Moses Sr., chief justice of the South Carolina Supreme Court (1868–1877)
- Stanley Mosk, associate justice of the California Supreme Court (1964–2001)
- Barbara Pariente, chief justice of the Supreme Court of Florida (2004–2006), associate justice of the Supreme Court of Florida (1997–2019)
- Morris Pashman, associate justice of the New Jersey Supreme Court (1973–1982)
- Jay Rabinowitz, chief justice of Alaska Supreme Court (1972–1992), associate justice of the Alaska Supreme Court (1965–1997)
- Stuart Rabner, chief justice of the New Jersey Supreme Court (2007–present)
- Eric S. Rosen, associate justice of the Kansas Supreme Court (2003–present)
- Albert Rosenblatt, associate judge of the New York Court of Appeals (1998–2007)
- Sidney M. Schreiber, associate justice of the New Jersey Supreme Court (1975–1984)
- Abbi Silver, associate justice of the Nevada Supreme Court (2019–present)
- Lee Solomon, associate justice of the Supreme Court of New Jersey (2014–2024)
- Leslie Stein, associate judge of the New York Court of Appeals (2015–present)
- Melissa Standridge, associate justice of the Kansas Supreme Court (2020–present)
- Gary Saul Stein, associate justice of the New Jersey Supreme Court (1985–2002)
- Samuel Steinfeld, chief justice of the Supreme Court of Kentucky (1972–1975)
- Jacob Tanzer, associate justice of the Oregon Supreme Court (1980–1982)
- Richard B. Teitelman, chief justice of the Supreme Court of Missouri (2011–2013), associate judge of the Supreme Court of Missouri (2002–2016)
- Mathew Tobriner, associate justice of the California Supreme Court (1962–1982)
- Sol Wachtler, chief judge of the New York Court of Appeals (1985–1992), associate judge of the New York Court of Appeals (1973–1985)
- David Wecht, associate justice of the Supreme Court of Pennsylvania (2016–present)
- Joseph Weintraub, chief justice of the New Jersey Supreme Court (1957–1973)
- Robert Wilentz, chief justice of the New Jersey Supreme Court (1979–1996)

== State attorneys general ==
State	Attorney general	Name	Party	Assumed office	Term expires
New York		Simon W. Rosendale	Democratic	January 1, 1892	December 31, 1893
Maryland		Isidor Rayner	Democratic	1899	1903
Maryland		Isaac Lobe Straus	Democratic	1907	1911
New York		Carl Sherman	Democratic	January 1, 1923	December 31, 1924
New York		Albert Ottinger	Republican	January 1, 1925	December 31, 1928
Ohio		Gilbert Bettman	Republican	January 14, 1929	January 12, 1933
New Jersey		David T. Wilentz	Democratic	February 4, 1934	February 4, 1944
New York		Nathaniel L. Goldstein	Republican	January 1, 1943	December 31, 1954
Delaware		H. Albert Young	Independent	1951	1955
Massachusetts		George Fingold	Republican	January 8, 1953	August 31, 1958
New York		Jacob Javits	Republican	January 1, 1955	January 9, 1957
New York		Louis J. Lefkowitz	Republican	January 10, 1957	December 31, 1978
California		Stanley Mosk	Democratic	January 5, 1959	August 31, 1964
New Hampshire		Warren Rudman	Republican	December 3, 1970	July 17, 1976
Rhode Island		Richard J. Israel	Republican	January 5, 1971	January 7, 1975
Florida		Robert Shevin	Democratic	January 5, 1971	January 2, 1979
Vermont		M. Jerome Diamond	Democratic	1975	1981
Rhode Island		Julius C. Michaelson	Democratic	January 7, 1975	January 2, 1979
New York		Robert Abrams	Democratic	January 1, 1979	December 31, 1993
Maryland		Stephen H. Sachs	Democratic	January 17, 1979	January 21, 1987
Connecticut		Joe Lieberman	Democratic	January 5, 1983	January 3, 1989
Connecticut		Richard Blumenthal	Democratic	January 9, 1991	January 5, 2011
Ohio		Lee Fisher	Democratic	January 14, 1991	January 9, 1995
New York		Oliver Koppell	Democratic	January 1, 1993	December 31, 1994
Rhode Island		Jeffrey B. Pine	Republican	January 5, 1993	January 2, 1999
New Jersey		Deborah Poritz	Republican	January 18, 1994	July 10, 1996
New York		Eliot Spitzer	Democratic	January 1, 1999	December 31, 2006
New Jersey		David Sampson	Unaffiliated	January 15, 2002	February 15, 2003
New Jersey		Stuart Rabner	Democratic	September 26, 2006	June 26, 2007
Maryland		Doug Gansler	Democratic	January 17, 2007	January 21, 2015
Louisiana		Buddy Caldwell	Democratic	January 14, 2008	February 2, 2011
Louisiana		Buddy Caldwell	Republican	February 2, 2011	January 11, 2016
New York		Eric Schneiderman	Democratic	January 1, 2011	May 8, 2018
Arizona		Tom Horne	Republican	January 3, 2011	January 5, 2015
Georgia		Sam Olens	Republican	January 10, 2011	November 1, 2016
Oregon		Ellen Rosenblum	Democratic	June 29, 2012	December 31, 2024
Delaware		Matthew Denn	Democratic	January 6, 2015	January 1, 2019
Maryland		Brian Frosh	Democratic	January 21, 2015	January 3, 2023
North Carolina		Josh Stein	Democratic	January 1, 2017	January 1, 2025
Pennsylvania		Josh Shapiro	Democratic	January 17, 2017	January 17, 2023
Michigan		Dana Nessel	Democratic	January 1, 2019	Incumbent
Colorado		Phil Weiser	Democratic	January 8, 2019	Incumbent
District of Columbia		Brian Schwalb	Democratic	January 2, 2023	Incumbent

== Scholars ==
- Floyd Abrams, William J. Brennan Jr. visiting professor at the Columbia University Graduate School of Journalism, expert on constitutional law, has argued in front of the Supreme Court on 13 occasions
- Mitchell N. Berman, Leon Meltzer Professor of Law at the University of Pennsylvania Law School, Professor of Philosophy at the University of Pennsylvania
- Anita Bernstein, Anita and Stuart Subotnick Professor of Law at Brooklyn Law School
- Alexander Bickel, legal scholar and expert on the United States Constitution
- Erwin Chemerinsky, legal scholar known for his studies of United States constitutional law and federal civil procedure; dean of the UC Berkeley School of Law
- Alan Dershowitz, former Felix Frankfurter Professor of Law at Harvard Law School, author
- Ronald Dworkin, former Frank Henry Sommer Professor of Law and Philosophy at New York University, former chair of Jurisprudence at University of Oxford, legal scholar, philosopher
- Richard Epstein, legal scholar and Laurence A. Tisch Professor of Law at New York University
- Noah Feldman, author and Felix Frankfurter Professor of Law at Harvard Law School
- Jill Fisch, Saul A. Fox Distinguished Professor of Business Law at the University of Pennsylvania Law School
- Michael Gerhardt, Samuel Ashe Distinguished Professor of Constitutional Law at the University of North Carolina School of Law
- Abraham S. Goldstein, dean of Yale Law School (1970–1975)
- Tom Goldstein, lawyer known for his advocacy and blogging about the Supreme Court of the United States
- Risa L. Goluboff, dean of the University of Virginia School of Law
- Arthur Lehman Goodhart, professor of Jurisprudence at the University of Oxford
- Irving L. Gornstein, executive director of the Supreme Court Institute; visiting professor at Georgetown University Law Center
- Jack Greenberg, lawyer for the Brown v. Board of Education case, worked for the NAACP Legal Defense and Educational Fund, and helped establish the Mexican American Legal Defense and Educational Fund with Pete Tijerina
- Alan Gura, litigator who successfully argued two landmark constitutional cases before the United States Supreme Court, District of Columbia v. Heller and McDonald v. Chicago
- Pamela Karlan, professor of law at Stanford Law School
- Michael Klarman, Kirkland & Ellis Professor at Harvard Law School
- David Leebron, dean of Columbia Law School (1996–2004)
- Nathan Lewin, lawyer for the Zivotofsky v. Clinton case, visiting professor, professor and First Amendment advocate
- Lance Liebman, director of the American Law Institute (1999–2014), dean of Columbia Law School (1991–1996)
- Martha Minow, dean of Harvard Law School (2009–2017)
- Jamie Raskin, U.S. representative for Maryland's 8th congressional district and former law professor at Washington College of Law
- Jeffrey Rosen, constitutional scholar; president and CEO of the National Constitution Center
- Albert J. Rosenthal, dean of Columbia Law School (1979–1984)
- Eugene V. Rostow, dean of Yale Law School (1955–1965)
- Jed Rubenfeld, Robert R. Slaughter Professor of Law at Yale Law School
- David Rudovsky, senior fellow at the University of Pennsylvania Law School, MacArthur Fellow
- Albert Sacks, dean of Harvard Law School (1971–1981)
- David Schizer, dean of Columbia Law School (2004–2014)
- Michael I. Sovern, dean of Columbia Law School (1970–1979)
- Robert A. Stein, Everett Fraser Professor of Law at the University of Minnesota
- Cass Sunstein, legal scholar, particularly in the fields of constitutional law, administrative law, environmental law, and law and behavioral economics
- Larry Tribe, Carl M. Loeb University Professor at Harvard Law School
- Steve Vladeck, Charles Alan Wright Chair in Federal Courts at the University of Texas School of Law
- Eugene Volokh, Gary T. Schwartz Professor of Law at the UCLA School of Law
- Michael Waldman, president of the Brennan Center for Justice at NYU School of Law
- Amy Wax, Robert Mundheim Professor of Law at the University of Pennsylvania Law School

== Public figures ==
- Elliott Abrams, politician and lawyer, has served in foreign policy positions for Presidents Ronald Reagan, George W. Bush, and Donald Trump
- Leslie Abramson, lawyer known for her role in the legal defense of Lyle and Erik Menendez
- Gloria Allred, lawyer and radio talk show host
- Ben Brafman, criminal defense attorney
- Marcia Clark, prosecutor and television correspondent known for being the lead prosecutor in the O. J. Simpson murder trial
- Roy Cohn, lawyer, chief-council for the Army–McCarthy hearings
- Lanny Davis, political operative, lawyer, consultant, lobbyist, author, and television commentator
- Marc Elias, election law and voting rights attorney, general counsel for Hillary Clinton 2016 presidential campaign and John Kerry 2004 presidential campaign, founder of Elias Law Group
- Doug Emhoff, entertainment lawyer, distinguished visiting professor at Georgetown University Law Center
- Ed Fagan, reparations lawyer, disbarred in New York and New Jersey for stealing money from Holocaust survivors
- Russ Feingold, U.S. senator from Wisconsin (1993–2011), president of the American Constitution Society (2020–2025)
- Geoffrey Fieger, attorney and occasional legal commentator for NBC and MSNBC
- Bertram Fields, Harvard-trained lawyer, famous for his work in the field of entertainment law
- Richard L. Fox, tax attorney
- Benjamin Ginsberg, Republican election lawyer
- Jane C. Ginsburg, Morton L. Janklow Professor of Literary and Artistic Property Law at Columbia Law School
- Martin D. Ginsburg, lawyer who specialized in tax law
- Daniel S. Goldman, majority counsel in the first impeachment inquiry against Donald Trump
- Stephen Harmelin, lawyer who specializes in corporate and transactional law
- Elie Honig, CNN senior legal analyst
- Ed Koch, politician, lawyer, political commentator, film critic, and television personality
- William Kunstler, U.S. lawyer famous for defending controversial "radical" clients such as the "Chicago Seven" protesters of the 1968 Democratic National Convention
- Samuel Leibowitz, defense attorney for the Scottsboro Boys
- Ari Melber, chief legal correspondent for MSNBC
- Peter Neufeld, founding partner in the civil rights law firm Neufeld Scheck & Brustinco, founder of the Innocence Project and defense lawyer for O. J. Simpson
- Louis Nizer, civil trial attorney and best-seller author
- Dean Preston, member of San Francisco Board of Supervisors, civil rights attorney, democratic-socialist activist
- Mimi Rocah, Westchester County district attorney
- David Rubenstein, billionaire businessman, philanthropist, former financial analyst and lawyer
- Barry Scheck, co-founder of the Innocence Project and defense lawyer for O. J. Simpson
- David Schoen, attorney specializing in federal criminal defense and civil rights law and counsel representing former president Donald Trump during his second impeachment trial
- Ben Shapiro, conservative political commentator, author, and attorney
- Robert Shapiro, lawyer and defense lawyer for O. J. Simpson
- Judy Sheindlin, star of Judge Judy, author, television personality, former Manhattan family court judge, civil court judge, and prosecutor
- Jerome J. Shestack, president of the American Bar Association (1997–1998)
- Adam Silver, commissioner of the National Basketball Association, lawyer
- Arlen Specter, lawyer, author, and U.S. senator from Pennsylvania
- David Stern, former commissioner of the National Basketball Association, lawyer
- Jeffrey Toobin, lawyer, author and legal analyst for CNN and The New Yorker
- Joseph Wapner, presiding judge of the ongoing reality court show The People's Court
