= Naomi Reice Buchwald =

American judge (born 1944)

Senior Judge of the United States District Court for the Southern District of New York
- Incumbent
- Assumed office March 21, 2012

Judge of the United States District Court for the Southern District of New York
- In office September 22, 1999 – March 21, 2012
- Appointed by: Bill Clinton
- Preceded by: Miriam G. Cedarbaum
- Succeeded by: Analisa Torres

Magistrate Judge of the United States District Court for the Southern District of New York
- In office 1980–1999

Personal details
- Born: Naomi Lynn Reice; February 14, 1944 (age 82) Kingston, New York, U.S.
- Children: David Buchwald
- Education: Brandeis University (BA); Columbia University (LLB)

Naomi Lynn Reice Buchwald (born February 14, 1944) is a senior United States district judge of the United States District Court for the Southern District of New York.

== Early life and education ==
Naomi Reice was born in 1944 in Kingston, New York, to Mr. and Mrs. Albert Reice. She graduated Phi Beta Kappa from Brandeis University in 1965 and then cum laude from Columbia Law School in 1968.

== Career ==
Naomi Reice, as she was then known, practiced law in New York City from 1968 until 1973, when she became an Assistant United States Attorney in the Southern District of New York, rising to the position of Chief of the Civil Division. She held this position until she was named a United States magistrate judge in the same district in 1980. She served as chief United States magistrate judge from 1994 until 1999.

=== Federal judicial service ===
On February 12, 1999, Buchwald was nominated by President Bill Clinton to a seat on the United States District Court for the Southern District of New York vacated by Miriam G. Cedarbaum. Buchwald was confirmed by the Senate on September 13, 1999, and received her commission on September 22, 1999. She assumed senior status (a form of semi-retirement) on March 21, 2012.

== Notable cases ==
=== SEC v. Dorozhko ===
In a 2008 civil case concerning insider trading, Buchwald ordered the U.S. Securities and Exchange Commission (SEC) to unfreeze the ill-gotten profits of Ukrainian resident Oleksandr Dorozhko. Dorozhko was accused of hacking into a company database to access a then-unreleased earnings announcement. Based upon the undisclosed information, Dorozhko invested $41,671 in put options, which he sold the following day for $328,571. The SEC froze the profits, but the judge ruled against the SEC, finding that while Dorozhko's conduct almost certainly was criminal, it did not fall within the relevant civil statute. Buchwald stayed her order pending appeal.

The United States Court of Appeals for the Second Circuit reversed the judge's ruling. When Dorozhko later stopped participating in his defense, Buchwald granted the SEC summary judgement and ordered Dorozhko to pay nearly $580,000 in disgorgement, prejudgment interest, and a civil penalty. The SEC managed to seize $296,456 of this amount.

=== Organic Seed Growers & Trade Ass'n v. Monsanto Co. ===
On February 24, 2012, Buchwald dismissed a lawsuit brought by a consortium of U.S. organic farmers and seed dealers aggrieved by Monsanto's genetically modified organism seeds. Monsanto denied that it had harmed anyone. After extensive briefing and oral argument, she held that the plaintiffs had no standing to sue, calling the case a "transparent effort to create a controversy where none exists." The decision was appealed to the United States Court of Appeals for the Federal Circuit on March 28, 2012. The Supreme Court declined to hear an appeal by the organic farmers in January 2014.

=== In re LIBOR-Based Financial Instruments Antitrust Litigation ===
In March 2013, Buchwald dismissed much, though not all, of a class-action lawsuit directed at the banks that allegedly manipulated the London Interbank Offered Rate (LIBOR).

In a 161-page memorandum of decision, she held that U.S. antitrust law did not apply. She said that since the LIBOR-setting process was never meant to be competitive, the suppression of that process was not anti-competitive.

In May 2016, the U.S. Court of Appeals for the Second Circuit reversed the dismissal order, reinstating the lawsuit.

=== Knight First Amendment Institute v. Donald J. Trump ===
On May 23, 2018, Buchwald held that President Trump's blocking of the plaintiffs from his Twitter account @realDonaldTrump was "because of their expressed political views violates the First Amendment." Buchwald differentiated between Twitter's muting and blocking functions, explaining that muting "vindicates the President's right to ignore certain speakers and to selectively amplify the voices of certain others . . . without restricting the right of the ignored to speak." Buchwald declined, however, to issue an injunction against the president and instead issued a declaratory judgment with the statement that "we must assume that the President and Scavino [ Dan Scavino, the White House director of social media] will remedy the blocking we have held to be unconstitutional."

This decision stands in conflict with similar cases from other courts. For example, earlier in 2018, a Kentucky judge upheld a governor's decision to block commenters from his Twitter and Facebook feeds in Morgan v. Bevin (E.D. Ky. 2018). Another example is Florida Democratic gubernatorial candidate Philip Levine, who is fighting a lawsuit for blocking Democratic activist and radio personality Grant Stern.

Buchwald's ruling was affirmed by the 2nd circuit on July 9, 2019, and the 2nd circuit denied en banc rehearing on March 23, 2020 Then, on April 5, 2021, the Supreme Court ordered the case to be dismissed as moot.

=== Chung v. Trump ===
On March 25, 2025, Buchwald granted a temporary restraining order blocking immigration officials from detaining or deporting Yunseo Chung, a 21-year old green card holder at Columbia University who participated in a pro-Palestine protest at Barnard College.

=== Recent Cases Heard ===
United States v. Batista (1:25-cr-00396), September 2, 2025

Paulynne, Inc. v. Paramount Global (1:25-cv-05206), September 22, 2025

Affiliated FM Insurance Company v. Maersk A/S (1:25-cv-05172), August 11, 2025

Johnson v. Fiverr Inc. (1:25-cv-05079), August 11, 2025

Arrow Electronics, Inc. v. Energy Wall, LLC (1:25-cv-04875), September 11, 2025

== Criticism by Preet Bharara ==
At a July 2014 roast for a departing prosecutor in his office, Preet Bharara, then the U.S. Attorney for the Southern District of New York, referred to Buchwald, who had just presided over his office’s first loss of a major insider trading case, as “the worst federal judge” he’d ever encountered.

== Personal life ==
She was married on January 19, 1974, to Don David Buchwald of Jericho, New York. They have a son, David Evan Buchwald, a New York state assemblyman.

== See also ==
- List of Jewish American jurists

Legal offices
Preceded by Miriam G. Cedarbaum	Judge of the United States District Court for the Southern District of New York; 1999–2012	Succeeded by Analisa Torres
