= Miriam Goldman Cedarbaum =

American judge (1929–2016)

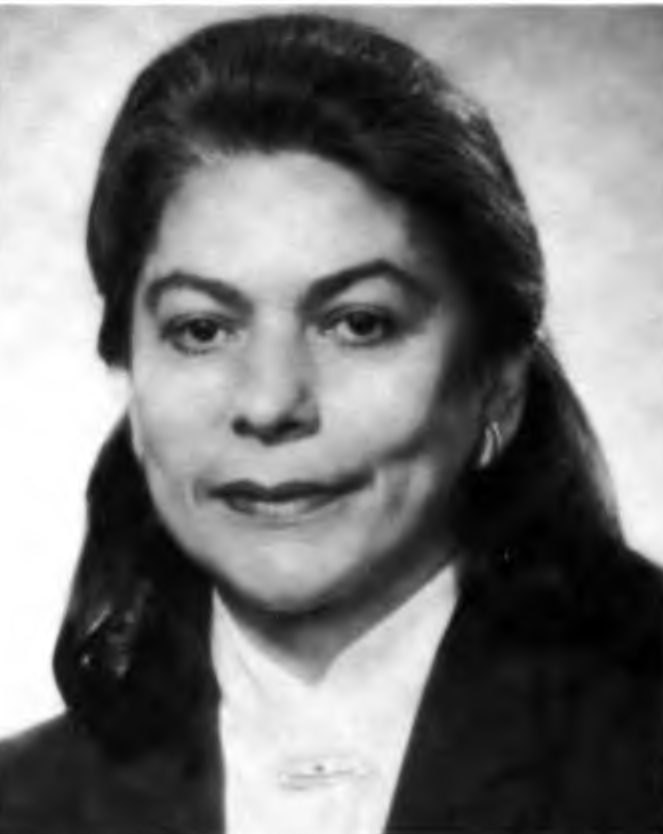

Senior Judge of the United States District Court for the Southern District of New York
- In office March 31, 1998 – February 5, 2016

Judge of the United States District Court for the Southern District of New York
- In office March 4, 1986 – March 31, 1998
- Appointed by: Ronald Reagan
- Preceded by: Charles E. Stewart Jr.
- Succeeded by: Naomi Reice Buchwald

Personal details
- Born: Miriam R. Goldman; September 16, 1929 Crown Heights, New York, U.S.
- Died: February 5, 2016 (aged 86) Manhattan, New York, U.S.
- Education: Barnard College (BA); Columbia University (LLB)

Miriam Goldman Cedarbaum (September 16, 1929 – February 5, 2016) was a United States district judge of the United States District Court for the Southern District of New York.

== Education ==
Born into a Jewish family, Cedarbaum grew up in the Crown Heights section of Brooklyn. She graduated from Erasmus Hall High School in Flatbush, Brooklyn. Cedarbaum received her Bachelor of Arts (B.A.) degree from Barnard College in 1950, and then her Bachelor of Laws (LL.B.) from Columbia Law School in 1953.

== Professional career ==
She began her career as a law clerk for Judge Edward Jordan Dimock of the United States District Court for the Southern District of New York from 1953 to 1954. She served as an assistant United States attorney for the Southern District of New York from 1954 to 1957. She served as an attorney of the Court of Claims Section of the Office of the Deputy United States Attorney General for the United States Department of Justice in Washington, D.C., from 1958 to 1959. She then served as a part-time legal consultant for New York City from 1959 to 1962. She served as first assistant counsel of the New York State Moreland Commission on the Alcoholic Beverage Control Law from 1963 to 1964. She was associate counsel of the Museum of Modern Art in New York City from 1965 to 1979. She was Acting Village Justice of the Village of Scarsdale, New York, from 1978 to 1982 and then was Village Justice of the same municipality from 1982 to 1986. She was in private practice with the law firm of Davis Polk & Wardwell in New York City from 1979 to 1986.

== Federal judicial service ==
Cedarbaum was nominated by President Ronald Reagan on February 3, 1986, to a seat vacated by Judge Charles E. Stewart Jr. She was confirmed by the United States Senate on March 3, 1986, and received her commission on March 4, 1986. Cedarbaum assumed senior status on March 31, 1998, serving in that status until her death.

== Notable cases ==
Cedarbaum oversaw the case against the would-be Times Square bomber Faisal Shahzad, who was sentenced to life in prison without parole on Tuesday, October 5, 2010. She also presided over the Martha Stewart case.

On 28 November 1988, she froze George Koskotas' United States assets (estimated to be between 30 and 35 million dollars) after the Bank of Crete filed in Manhattan a lawsuit accusing Koskotas of having embezzled hundreds of millions of dollars; later on Koskotas scandal overthrew the Greek government of Andreas Papandreou in 1989.

== Personal ==
Cedarbaum was married on August 25, 1957, to the late Bernard Cedarbaum, long-time partner at Carter Ledyard & Milburn, and has two children, Daniel, a lawyer and leader of Reconstructionist Judaism in Chicago, and Jonathan, a lawyer in D.C. who clerked for Associate Justice David Souter of the Supreme Court.

== Sources ==
- "'Retirement' Missing From Vocabulary Of NY Judges". Salon.
- The Federal Judge With Terror On Her Docket
- Judge Rules City Owns The Name Tavern On The Green
- Project Continuum: In Chambers with Miriam Goldman Cedarbaum '50
- Wall Street Journal article discussing Judge Cedarbaum in the context of Judge Sotomayor's Supreme Court nomination

Legal offices
Preceded by Charles E. Stewart Jr.	Judge of the United States District Court for the Southern District of New York; 1986–1998	Succeeded by Naomi Reice Buchwald
