= Sidney Sugarman =

American judge (1904–1974)

Senior Judge of the United States District Court for the Southern District of New York
- In office June 30, 1971 – August 9, 1974

Chief Judge of the United States District Court for the Southern District of New York
- In office 1966–1971
- Preceded by: Sylvester J. Ryan
- Succeeded by: David Norton Edelstein

Judge of the United States District Court for the Southern District of New York
- In office October 21, 1949 – June 30, 1971
- Appointed by: Harry S. Truman
- Preceded by: Seat established by 63 Stat. 493
- Succeeded by: Charles E. Stewart Jr.

Personal details
- Born: Sidney Sugarman; September 4, 1904 Boston, Massachusetts
- Died: August 9, 1974 (aged 69) Hallandale, Florida
- Education: Boston University School of Law (LL.B.)

Sidney Sugarman (September 4, 1904 – August 9, 1974) was a United States district judge of the United States District Court for the Southern District of New York from 1949 to 1974 and its Chief Judge from 1966 to 1971.

== Education and career ==
Born in Boston, Massachusetts, Sugarman received a Bachelor of Laws from Boston University School of Law in 1925. He was in private practice in New York City, New York, from 1927 to 1946. He was counsel for the Bronx County Clerk's Office in New York from 1939 to 1946. He was special deputy comptroller for New York City from 1946 to 1949.

== Federal judicial service ==
Sugarman received a recess appointment from President Harry S. Truman on October 21, 1949, to the United States District Court for the Southern District of New York, to a new seat created by 63 Stat. 493. He was nominated to the same seat by President Truman on January 5, 1950. He was confirmed by the United States Senate on April 28, 1950, and received his commission on May 1, 1950. He served as Chief Judge from 1966 to 1971. He was a member of the Judicial Conference of the United States from 1968 to 1971. He assumed senior status on June 30, 1971. Sugarman served in that capacity until his death on August 9, 1974, in Hallandale, Florida.

== See also ==
- List of Jewish American jurists

== Sources ==
Legal offices
Preceded by Seat established by 63 Stat. 493	Judge of the United States District Court for the Southern District of New York; 1949–1971	Succeeded by Charles E. Stewart Jr.
Preceded by Sylvester J. Ryan	Chief Judge of the United States District Court for the Southern District of New York; 1966–1971	Succeeded by David Norton Edelstein
