= Lloyd Francis MacMahon =

American judge (1912–1989)

Judge of the United States Foreign Intelligence Surveillance Court
- In office July 5, 1985 – April 8, 1989
- Appointed by: Warren Burger
- Preceded by: Frederick Bernard Lacey
- Succeeded by: Sidney Aronovitz

Senior Judge of the United States District Court for the Southern District of New York
- In office May 31, 1982 – April 8, 1989

Chief Judge of the United States District Court for the Southern District of New York
- In office 1980–1982
- Preceded by: David Norton Edelstein
- Succeeded by: Constance Baker Motley

Judge of the United States District Court for the Southern District of New York
- In office September 10, 1959 – May 31, 1982
- Appointed by: Dwight D. Eisenhower
- Preceded by: Lawrence Walsh
- Succeeded by: John F. Keenan

United States Attorney for the Southern District of New York Interim
- In office July 11, 1955 – September 1, 1955
- President: Dwight Eisenhower
- Preceded by: J. Edward Lumbard
- Succeeded by: Paul W. Williams

Personal details
- Born: Lloyd Francis MacMahon; August 12, 1912 Elmira, New York, U.S.
- Died: April 8, 1989 (aged 76) White Plains, New York, U.S.
- Education: Cornell University (AB, LLB)

Lloyd Francis MacMahon (August 12, 1912 – April 8, 1989) was a United States district judge of the United States District Court for the Southern District of New York from 1959 to 1989 and its Chief Judge from 1980 to 1982.

== Education and career ==
Born on August 12, 1912, in Elmira, New York, MacMahon received an Artium Baccalaureus degree in 1936 from Cornell University and a Bachelor of Laws in 1938 from Cornell Law School. He was a lieutenant in the United States Naval Reserve during World War II from 1944 to 1945. He was in private practice in New York City from 1942 to 1953 and again from 1955 to 1959. He was the Chief Assistant United States Attorney for the Southern District of New York from 1953 to 1955. He was the United States Attorney for the Southern District of New York in 1955.

=== Federal judicial service ===
MacMahon was nominated by President Dwight D. Eisenhower on March 10, 1959, to a seat on the United States District Court for the Southern District of New York vacated by Judge Lawrence Walsh. He was confirmed by the United States Senate on September 9, 1959, and received his commission on September 10, 1959. He served as Chief Judge and as a member of the Judicial Conference of the United States from 1980 to 1982. He assumed senior status on May 31, 1982. He served as a Judge of the United States Foreign Intelligence Surveillance Court from 1985 to 1989. His served on the bench until his death on April 8, 1989, due to a cerebral hemorrhage in White Plains, New York. Rudy Giuliani was one of his law clerks.

== Sources ==
Legal offices
Preceded by Lawrence Walsh	Judge of the United States District Court for the Southern District of New York; 1959–1982	Succeeded by John F. Keenan
Preceded by David Norton Edelstein	Chief Judge of the United States District Court for the Southern District of New York; 1980–1982	Succeeded by Constance Baker Motley
Preceded by Frederick Bernard Lacey	Judge of the United States Foreign Intelligence Surveillance Court; 1985–1989	Succeeded by Sidney Aronovitz
