= Charles E. Stewart Jr. =

American judge

Senior Judge of the United States District Court for the Southern District of New York
- In office January 2, 1985 – October 28, 1994

Judge of the United States District Court for the Southern District of New York
- In office June 30, 1972 – January 2, 1985
- Appointed by: Richard Nixon
- Preceded by: Sidney Sugarman
- Succeeded by: Miriam Goldman Cedarbaum

Personal details
- Born: September 1, 1916 Glen Ridge, New Jersey, U.S.
- Died: October 28, 1994 (aged 78) Poughkeepsie, New York, U.S.
- Education: Harvard University (BA, LLB)

Charles Edward Stewart Jr. (September 1, 1916 – October 28, 1994) was a United States district judge of the United States District Court for the Southern District of New York.

== Early life and education ==
Born September 1, 1916, in Glen Ridge, New Jersey, Stewart received a Bachelor of Arts degree from Harvard University in 1938 and a Bachelor of Laws from Harvard Law School in 1948. During World War II, he served as an Army Captain in General George S. Patton's tank corps, and won the Bronze Star. He was in private practice in New York City, New York from 1948 to 1972.

== Federal judicial service ==
Stewart was nominated by President Richard Nixon on June 15, 1972, to a seat on the United States District Court for the Southern District of New York vacated by Judge Sidney Sugarman. He was confirmed by the United States Senate on June 28, 1972, and received his commission on June 30, 1972. He assumed senior status on January 2, 1985. His service terminated on October 28, 1994, due to his death in Poughkeepsie, New York.

== Sources ==
Legal offices
Preceded by Sidney Sugarman	Judge of the United States District Court for the Southern District of New York; 1972–1985	Succeeded by Miriam Goldman Cedarbaum
