= Alfred Conkling Coxe Jr. =

American judge (1880–1957)

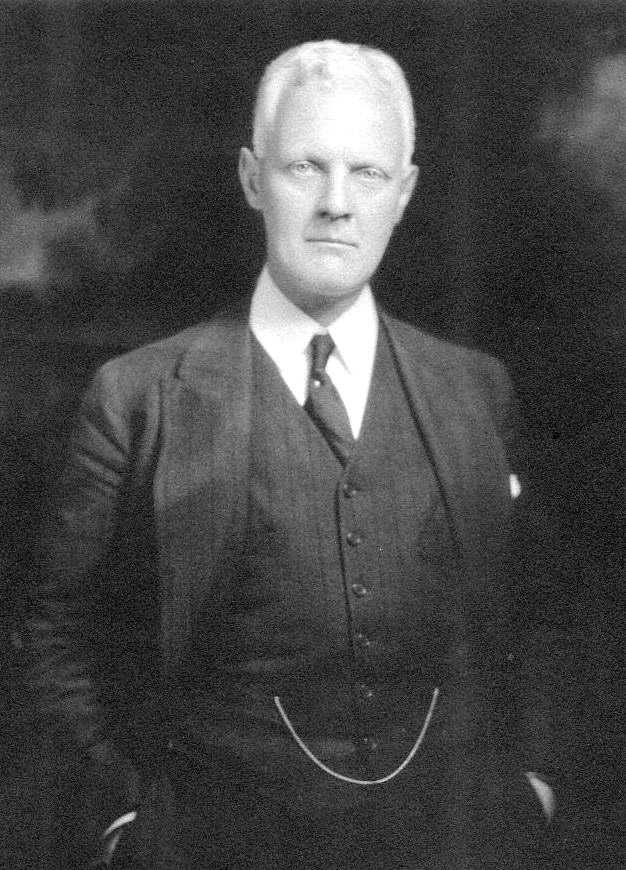

Senior Judge of the United States District Court for the Southern District of New York
- In office January 31, 1951 – December 21, 1957

Judge of the United States District Court for the Southern District of New York
- In office May 1, 1929 – January 31, 1951
- Appointed by: Herbert Hoover
- Preceded by: Seat established by 45 Stat. 1317
- Succeeded by: David Norton Edelstein

Personal details
- Born: Alfred Conkling Coxe Jr. May 7, 1880 Utica, New York, US
- Died: December 21, 1957 (aged 77) Old Lyme, Connecticut, US
- Resting place: Forest Hill Cemetery; Utica, New York
- Parent: Alfred Conkling Coxe Sr. (father)
- Relatives: Alfred Conkling; Roscoe Conkling; Samuel Hanson Cox
- Education: Yale University (A.B.); Cornell Law School

Alfred Conkling Coxe Jr. (May 7, 1880 – December 21, 1957) was a United States district judge of the United States District Court for the Southern District of New York.

== Education and career ==
Born in Utica, New York, on May 7, 1880, Coxe received an Artium Baccalaureus degree from Yale University in 1901 then attended Cornell Law School. He was in private practice in Utica from 1903 to 1905, and in New York City from 1905 to 1929. In 1911 he helped found The New York Young Republican Club.

== Federal judicial service ==
Coxe was nominated by President Herbert Hoover on April 18, 1929, to the United States District Court for the Southern District of New York, to a new seat authorized by 45 Stat. 1317. He was confirmed by the United States Senate on April 29, 1929, and received his commission on May 1, 1929. He assumed senior status on January 31, 1951. His service terminated on December 21, 1957, due to his death in Old Lyme, Connecticut. He was interred in Forest Hill Cemetery in Utica, New York.

== Family ==
Coxe was the son of Alfred Conkling Coxe Sr., who was a judge on the United States Court of Appeals for the Second Circuit, and the great-grandson of Alfred Conkling, who served as a United States representative from upstate New York and a judge on the United States District Court for the Northern District of New York. He was also a grand nephew of Roscoe Conkling, who was a Congressman and Senator from New York and boss of the state's Republican political machine. Coxe's great-grandfather was abolitionist minister Samuel Hanson Cox.

== Sources ==
Legal offices
Preceded by Seat established by 45 Stat. 1317	Judge of the United States District Court for the Southern District of New York; 1929–1951	Succeeded by David Norton Edelstein
