= Jed S. Rakoff =

American federal judge (born 1943)

Senior Judge of the United States District Court for the Southern District of New York
- Incumbent
- Assumed office December 31, 2010

Judge of the United States District Court for the Southern District of New York
- In office March 1, 1996 – December 31, 2010
- Appointed by: Bill Clinton
- Preceded by: David Norton Edelstein
- Succeeded by: Katherine B. Forrest

Personal details
- Born: Jed Saul Rakoff; August 1, 1943 (age 83) Philadelphia, Pennsylvania, U.S.
- Relatives: Todd Rakoff (brother)
- Education: Swarthmore College (BA); Balliol College, Oxford (MPhil); Harvard University (JD)

Jed Saul Rakoff (born August 1, 1943) is an American lawyer and jurist serving as a senior United States district judge of the U.S. District Court for the Southern District of New York. He was appointed in 1996 by President Bill Clinton, and assumed senior status in 2010.

== Early life and education ==
Rakoff is Jewish and was born in Philadelphia, Pennsylvania, on August 1, 1943. He grew up in the Germantown section of Philadelphia and attended Central High School of Philadelphia. Rakoff received his Bachelor of Arts in English literature from Swarthmore College in 1964, where he was student council president and editor-in-chief of the newspaper. He earned his Master of Philosophy (M.Phil.) in Indian history in 1966 from Balliol College at Oxford University, and received a Juris Doctor, cum laude, from Harvard Law School in 1969, where he was a member of the Harvard Legal Aid Bureau. He has received honorary degrees from Saint Francis University and from Swarthmore.

== Career ==
After graduating from law school, he served as a law clerk for Judge Abraham Lincoln Freedman of the United States Court of Appeals for the Third Circuit from 1969 to 1970. Then, Rakoff spent two years in private practice at Debevoise & Plimpton before spending seven years as a federal prosecutor with the United States Attorney for the Southern District of New York. For the last two of those years, he was Chief of the Business and Securities Fraud Prosecutions Unit. He then returned to private practice, as a partner with Mudge, Rose, Guthrie, Alexander & Ferdon (1980–90) and then with Fried, Frank, Harris, Shriver & Jacobson (1990–96). He headed both firms' criminal defense and civil Racketeer Influenced and Corrupt Organizations Act (RICO) sections.

== Federal judicial service ==
On October 11, 1995, President Bill Clinton nominated Rakoff to fill a seat on the United States District Court for the Southern District of New York vacated by David Norton Edelstein. He was confirmed by the Senate on December 29, 1995, received his commission on January 4, 1996, and entered on duty on March 1, 1996. On December 31, 2010, he assumed senior status, although he continues to take the full load of cases.

Rakoff has been a major feeder judge, sending more clerks to the Supreme Court than any other district court judge from 2011 to 2015 and numerous clerks thereafter.

== Academic and foundation service ==
Rakoff is adjunct professor of law at Columbia Law School. He has taught there since 1988, teaching the first-year class in Criminal Law and seminars on White-Collar Crime, the Interplay of Civil and Criminal Law, Class Actions, and Science and the Courts. He is an adjunct professor at NYU Law School, where he teaches seminars on Class Actions and on Science and the Courts, and also teaches annual one-week seminars at The University of California, Berkeley, School of Law and the University of Virginia School of Law. He previously served on the Board of Managers of Swarthmore College and on the Governing Board of the MacArthur Foundation's Law & Neuroscience Project. Rakoff was elected to the American Law Institute in 2009 and to the American Academy of Arts and Sciences in 2013. He is a fellow of the American College of Trial Lawyers. Rakoff represented the federal judiciary on the National Commission on Forensic Science (2013–17) and co-chaired the National Academies of Science's Committee on Eyewitness Identification. He served on the New York City Bar Association's Executive Committee and was chair of the Association's Nomination, Honors, and Criminal Law Committees. He chaired the Second Circuit's Bankruptcy Committee and the Southern District of New York's Grievance Committee and Criminal Justice Advisory Board. He participated in the development of the third and fourth editions of the federal judiciary's Manual on Scientific Evidence and co-edited The Judge's Guide to Neuroscience. He has assisted the U.S. government in training foreign judges in Azerbaijan, Bahrain, Bangladesh, Bosnia, Dubai, Egypt, Iraq, Kuwait, the Maldives, Morocco, Saudi Arabia, Sir Lanka, Tunisia, and Turkey. He was a senior advisor to the President's Council of Advisors on Science and Technology's Advisory Group on Forensic Science and served as an adviser on the ALI project to revise the sentencing provisions of the Model Penal Code.

Since 2009, Rakoff has been a trustee of the William Nelson Cromwell Foundation, which sponsors research in U.S. legal history. Since 2020, he has been a member of the Board of Directors of the Touro Synagogue Foundation.

Rakoff's younger brother, Todd, is a longtime professor at Harvard Law School.

== Visiting judicial service ==
Throughout his judicial career, Rakoff has sat regularly by designation on the U.S. Court of Appeals for the Second Circuit. In addition, since 2011, he has regularly sat by designation on the Ninth Circuit, as well as occasionally on the Third Circuit. He has also occasionally sat by designation in the federal district courts of the Eastern District of California, the Middle District of Florida, and the Northern District of Oklahoma.

== Travel ban ==
On April 13, 2013, Rakoff was on a list released by the Russian Ministry of Foreign Affairs (MID) of Americans banned from entering the Russian Federation. The list was a direct response to the so-called Magnitsky list issued by the United States the day before.

== Recognition ==
In 2011, Matt Taibbi wrote in Rolling Stone magazine, "Federal judge Jed Rakoff, a former prosecutor with the U.S. Attorney's office here in New York, is fast becoming a sort of legal hero of our time."

In 2014, Fortune Magazine listed Rakoff as one of the World's 50 Greatest Leaders.

In 2017, Pulitzer Prize-winning journalist Jessie Eisinger devoted two chapters of his book The Chickenshit Club to Rakoff, concluding that "Rakoff has cried out about the injustice of the [criminal law] system. He has played a role to change the way the country addresses corporate criminals."

In 2025, Rakoff was one of three judges profiled in Reynolds Holding's book Better Judgment: How Three Judges Are Bringing Justice Back to the Courts.

Among other awards, Rakoff has received the Federal Bar Council's Learned Hand Award for Excellence in Federal Jurisprudence (2018), the American College of Trial Lawyers' Leon Silverman Award for Distinguished Public Service (2021), and the World Jurist Association's Medal of Honor (2023).

== Legal expertise ==
Speaking about the federal mail fraud statute while still a prosecutor, Rakoff wrote, "To federal prosecutors of white-collar crime, the mail fraud statute is our Stradivarius, our Colt .45, our Louisville Slugger, our Cuisinart—and our true love. We may flirt with RICO, show off with 10b-5, and call the conspiracy law 'darling,' but we always come home to the virtues of [mail fraud], with its simplicity, adaptability, and comfortable familiarity. It understands us and, like many a foolish spouse, we like to think we understand it." Judge Rakoff also co-authored the civil volumes of Modern Federal Jury Instructions.

In addition to pushing back against what he has called the SEC's superficial punishment of companies accused of fraud and the failure of the Department of Justice to prosecute those responsible, Rakoff has held the federal death penalty unconstitutional, sharply criticized U.S. sentencing guidelines, inserted himself into corporate governance reform at WorldCom, pushed for public release of documents, and written several of the leading decisions on insider trading.

Swarthmore, in conferring his honorary degree, noted that Rakoff is "broadly recognized as a legal thinker, scholar and judge who not only elucidates and enforces the law, but interprets, defends and challenges it in light of the principles of ethics and social justice that it is designed to serve" and that his opinions "are cited as models of intellectual clarity and judicial vision by lawyers and judges throughout this nation."

Rakoff is well known among lawyers for showing little patience with delays and moving cases along rapidly. He has said he feels bad taking lawyers and others to task, but he saw in private practice how delays and gamesmanship made the American legal system too slow and expensive for the average person. "The price of being a nice guy is too high—much too high—in terms of the system of justice", Rakoff added.

== Notable cases ==
=== United States v. Quinones ===
In 2002, Rakoff declared the federal death penalty unconstitutional, writing:

The best available evidence indicates that, on the one hand, innocent people are sentenced to death with materially greater frequency than was previously supposed and that, on the other hand, convincing proof of their innocence often does not emerge until long after their convictions. It is therefore fully foreseeable that in enforcing the death penalty a meaningful number of innocent people will be executed who otherwise would eventually be able to prove their innocence. It follows that implementation of the Federal Death Penalty Act not only deprives innocent people of a significant opportunity to prove their innocence, and thereby violates procedural due process, but also creates an undue risk of executing innocent people, and thereby violates substantive due process.

Opponents of capital punishment heralded his ruling. The New York Times called it "a cogent, powerful argument that all members of Congress—indeed, all Americans—should contemplate". But the decision was reversed by the United States Court of Appeals for the Second Circuit, United States v. Quinones, 313 F.3d 49 (2d Cir. 2002). Before he found the death penalty unconstitutional in 2002, Rakoff says he suspected his ruling would be reversed because he knew a majority of the Second Circuit would interpret a Supreme Court decision on the issue, Herrera v. Collins, differently than he did.

=== Aguinda v. Texaco ===
Rakoff presided over a class-action lawsuit against Texaco, brought under the Alien Tort Claims Act, by a class of Ecuadoreans, including several indigenous tribes, claiming that Texaco caused extensive destruction to the Oriente rainforest. He dismissed the case on forum non conveniens grounds, writing: "While reserving final decision on this motion, the Court is tentatively of the view that, if Ecuador provides an adequate alternative forum, it is the proper place to try these cases, with the Peruvian plaintiffs afforded the alternative of a Peruvian forum if they so prefer. Indeed, the voluminous record before the Court demonstrates that these cases... have everything to do with Ecuador and very little to do with the United States. Moreover, the notion that a New York jury (which plaintiffs have demanded) applying Ecuadorian law (which likely governs the claims here made) could meaningfully assess what occurred in the Amazonian rainforests of Ecuador in the late 1960s and early 1970s is problematic on its face". Rakoff's decision was affirmed on appeal, 303 F.3d 470 (2d Cir. 2002).

=== Motorola Credit Corp. v. Uzan ===
Motorola Credit Corporation and Nokia brought suit against the Uzan family of Turkey. Rakoff found that the Uzans perpetrated multi-billion-dollar fraud in connivance with various corporate defendants, involving the making of numerous false statements designed to induce Motorola and Nokia to extend the loans in issue, diluting the collateral pledged to secure the loans, and filing false criminal charges in Turkey against plaintiffs' senior executives, claiming the executives engaged in "explicit and armed threat[s] to kill", blackmail, and kidnap members of the Uzan family. Rakoff awarded over $2.1 billion in compensatory damages and an equal amount in punitive damages.

=== SEC v. WorldCom ===
Rakoff presided over the SEC's accounting fraud suit against Worldcom, and on July 7, 2003, approved a settlement between them. He appointed former SEC chair Richard C. Breeden to serve as Corporate Monitor. Breeden actively involved himself in the company's management and prepared a report for Rakoff, "Restoring Trust", in which he proposed extensive corporate governance reforms, as part of an effort to "cast the new MCI into what he hoped would become a model of how shareholders should be protected and how companies should be run." The reforms were implemented, and Rakoff later credited Breeden with "helping to transform a fraud-ridden company into an honest, well-governed, economically viable entity, MCI, Inc." Verizon purchased WorldCom in January 2006.

=== Associated Press v. Dept. of Defense ===
In November 2004, the Associated Press submitted a request under the Freedom of Information Act seeking unredacted transcripts of the Department of Defense's Combatant Status Review Tribunals' proceedings and related documentation. In response, the Government invoked FOIA's Exemption 6, claiming that it redacted identifying information to protect the detainees' personal privacy. Rakoff's rulings highlighted what he viewed as the hypocrisy of the Government's position; he wrote, "one might well wonder whether the detainees share the view that keeping their identities secret is in their own best interests" and held that, in any case, the detainees had no reasonable expectation of privacy in the information at issue. He therefore ordered the Defense Department to release the unredacted transcripts (including the detainees' names) and related documentation (AP v. United States DOD, 2006 U.S. Dist. LEXIS 211, 410 F. Supp. 2d 147 (S.D.N.Y. January 4, 2006); AP v. United States DOD, 2006 U.S. Dist. LEXIS 2456 S.D.N.Y. January 23, 2006.)

The Defense Department complied with the order, releasing the unredacted transcripts and related documents relating to those 317 detainees (of the approximately 500 at Guantanamo) who participated in Combatant Status Review Tribunals. The released records provided "the most comprehensive view to date of the Guantanamo prison population, as well as an exhaustive catalog of the U.S. government's charges against detainees who—in page after page of tribunal proceeding transcripts—protest their treatment and proclaim their innocence."

After the Defense Department complied with most of Rakoff's order, the Bush administration appealed the remainder of it on May 5, 2008. The United States Court of Appeals, Second Circuit reversed the remainder of Rakoff's decision, holding that detainees and their family members had a measurable privacy interest and the AP had failed to show how the public interest would be served by disclosure.

=== Bailey v. Pataki ===
In 2005, Governor George Pataki of New York promulgated an executive order that allowed state-employed psychiatrists to effectuate the involuntary civil commitment—without any prior hearing or judicial determination—of sex offenders approaching the end of their prison terms. Under Pataki's rule, the state's psychiatrists simply had to deem such inmates "mentally ill and in need of involuntary care and treatment" and they were then committed to a mental institution without any pre-commitment due process. In an opinion and order dated July 8, 2010, Rakoff found that the government's actions "rather blatantly violated plaintiffs' constitutional rights" (Bailey v. Pataki, 722 F.Supp.2d 443, 445 (S.D.N.Y. July 6, 2010)). He explained: "pre-deprivation procedural safeguards must be provided when it is feasible to do so—and there is nothing in the record here, taken most favorably to plaintiffs, that suggests any reason why it was infeasible for the plaintiffs here to be given pre-deprivation notice, pre-deprivation appointment of court-appointed physicians, or a pre-deprivation hearing. Indeed, it would have been the simplest thing in the world to have all the required procedures undertaken before a given plaintiff completed his prison term" (Bailey, 722 F.Supp.2d at 450). The Second Circuit upheld Rakoff's ruling, agreeing that an official in the defendants' position would have known that the process by which plaintiffs were committed did not satisfy basic constitutional requirements (Bailey v. Pataki, 708 F.3d 391 (2d Cir. 2013)).

=== United States v. Adelson ===
A jury convicted Richard Adelson, as Chief Operating Officer and (eventually) president of Impath, Inc.—a public company specializing in cancer diagnosis testing—of conspiracy, securities fraud, and three false filing counts related to filings made in the latter half of 2002, but acquitted him of all seven counts that related to earlier filings. The gist of the indictment was that Adelson joined a conspiracy, initially concocted by others, to materially overstate Impath's financial results, thereby artificially inflating its stock price. At sentencing, Rakoff said, "as a practical matter, a sentence of life imprisonment was effectively available here, for the statutory maximum sentence for the combined five counts of which Adelson had been convicted was 85 years, which, given his current age of 40, would have led to his imprisonment until the age of 125. Even the Government [prosecutors] blinked at this barbarity." The court actually sentenced Adelson to three and a half years in prison and restitution of $50 million, $12 million of which would be paid by the immediate forfeiture of most of his assets and the rest by payments of 15% of his monthly gross income.

To put this matter in broad perspective, it is obvious that sentencing is the most sensitive, and difficult, task that any judge is called upon to undertake. Where the Sentencing Guidelines provide reasonable guidance, they are of considerable help to any judge in fashioning a sentence that is fair, just, and reasonable. But where, as here, the calculations under the guidelines have run so amok that they are patently absurd on their face, a Court is forced to place greater reliance on the more general considerations set forth in section 3553(a), as carefully applied to the particular circumstances of the case and of the human being who will bear the consequences.

The Second Circuit affirmed Rakoff on appeal (United States v. Adelson, 441 F.Supp.2d 506 (S.D.N.Y. 2006), affirmed, 37 Fed.Appx. 713 (2d Cir. 2007)).

=== Securities and Exchange Commission v. Bank of America ===
On August 3, 2009, Bank of America agreed to pay the SEC a $33 million fine, without admission or denial of charges, over the non-disclosure of an agreement to pay up to $5.8 billion of bonuses at Merrill. In an unusual action, Rakoff refused to approve the settlement on August 5 and then, on September 14, after at least one hearing, rejected the settlement outright and told the parties to prepare for trial to begin no later than February 1, 2010:

Overall, indeed, the parties' submissions, when carefully read, leave the distinct impression that the proposed Consent Judgment was a contrivance designed to provide the S.E.C. with the facade of enforcement and the management of the Bank with a quick resolution of an embarrassing inquiry – all at the expense of the sole alleged victims, the shareholders. Even under the most deferential review, this proposed Consent Judgment cannot remotely be called fair . . . . The fine, if looked at from the standpoint of the violation, is also inadequate, in that $33 million is a trivial penalty for a false statement that materially infected a multi-billion-dollar merger. But since the fine is imposed, not on the individuals putatively responsible, but on the shareholders, it is worse than pointless: it further victimizes the victims. Oscar Wilde once famously said that a cynic is someone "who knows the price of everything and the value of nothing." Oscar Wilde, Lady Windermere's Fan (1892). The proposed Consent Judgment in this case suggests a rather cynical relationship between the parties: the S.E.C. gets to claim that it is exposing wrongdoing on the part of the Bank of America in a high-profile merger; the Bank's management gets to claim that they have been coerced into an onerous settlement by overzealous regulators. And all this is done at the expense, not only of the shareholders, but also of the truth.

Rakoff forced Bank of America and the SEC to come back with a 35-page statement about what happened—and a higher penalty. He reluctantly approved the revised deal, calling the revised settlement "half-baked justice at best" and quoting "the great American philosopher Yogi Berra" in his ruling. Washington Post columnist Steven Pearlstein commented approvingly, "maybe Rakoff is exactly the kind of activist judge we need more of."

=== Securities and Exchange Commission v. Citigroup ===
The New York Times reported that "Taking a broad swipe at the Securities and Exchange Commission's practice of allowing companies to settle cases without admitting that they had done anything wrong, a federal judge on Monday rejected a $285 million settlement between Citigroup and the agency. The judge, Jed S. Rakoff of United States District Court in Manhattan, said that he could not determine whether the agency's settlement with Citigroup was 'fair, reasonable, adequate and in the public interest', as required by law, because the agency had claimed, but had not proved, that Citigroup committed fraud."

Rakoff wrote: "The SEC's long-standing policy—hallowed by history, but not by reason—of allowing defendants to enter into consent judgments without admitting or denying the underlying allegations, deprives the court of even the most minimal assurance that the substantial injunctive relief it is being asked to impose has any basis in fact." He added that the agency's settlement policy creates substantial potential for abuse because it "asks the court to employ its power and assert its authority when it does not know the facts."

The SEC appealed his decision to the Second Circuit, which, in June 2014, vacated it, saying Rakoff had overstepped his authority and sending the case back to district court. Circuit Judge Rosemary Pooler, writing for the unanimous panel, "found that Rakoff has showed too little deference to the SEC in rejecting the pact."

=== Arce v. Douglas ===
In 2010, Arizona enacted a so-called "ethnic studies" ban, which prevented students in predominantly Latino school districts from participating in a program that incorporated "historical and contemporary Mexican American contributions into coursework and classroom studies." A group of plaintiffs challenged the law in federal court. When the case went up on appeal, Rakoff, sitting by designation on the Ninth Circuit, wrote an opinion reversing the district court's grant of summary judgment for defendants and remanding plaintiffs' equal protection claim for trial (Arce v. Douglas, 793 F.3d 968, 977 (9th Cir. 2015)). He wrote that parts of the Arizona law, while not facially discriminatory, raised constitutional issues, citing in particular legislative and other evidence of the laws' discriminatory purpose. The case went to trial in July 2017.

=== United States v. Gupta ===
In 2012, Rakoff presided over the landmark insider trading trial of Rajat Gupta, one of the most prominent business executives to be tried and convicted in recent decades. Gupta, the former managing partner of McKinsey, served as a director on the boards of many major American businesses, including Goldman Sachs and Procter & Gamble.

At trial, prosecutors showed that Gupta, at the height of the financial crisis, leaked information about Warren Buffett's $5 billion investment in Goldman Sachs to his friend Raj Rajaratnam, a hedge-fund billionaire. Indeed, within a minute of finishing a Goldman Sachs Board of Directors teleconference about the investment, Gupta phoned Rajaratnam at his Galleon Group office in New York. Minutes later, Rajaratnam ordered his traders to buy as much as $40 million in Goldman Sachs stock.

Gupta was found guilty on three counts of security fraud and one count of conspiracy. Rakoff sentenced him to two years, saying: "The heart of Mr. Gupta's offenses here, it bears repeating, is his egregious breach of trust." Rakoff critiqued the U.S. Sentencing Guidelines, which base levels of punishment on the amount of illicit trading gains accrued in an insider trading case. Since the underlying crime in a case like Gupta's is breach of a fiduciary duty, not fraud on the market, the amount of illicit gains, Rakoff argued, is a poor proxy for the amount of harm the defendant inflicted (United States v. Gupta, 904 F. Supp. 2d 349, 352 (S.D.N.Y. 2012)). On direct appeal, the conviction and sentence were affirmed (747 F.3d 111 (2d Cir. 2014)).

=== United States v. Salman ===
In 2015, while sitting by designation on the Ninth Circuit Court of Appeals, Rakoff—whose decisions are normally subject to review by the Second Circuit—created a circuit split with the Second Circuit on the "devilishly complex" issue of what constitutes insider trading. In what has been called "the stuff of legend" and "delicious irony", Rakoff's opinion in the case, United States v. Salman, prompted the Supreme Court to review and unanimously affirm it, thereby overturning the Second Circuit's conflicting doctrine (United States v. Salman, 792 F.3d 1087, 1088 (9th Cir. 2015), cert. granted in part, 136 S. Ct. 899, 193 L. Ed. 2d 788 (2016), and aff'd, 137 S. Ct. 420, 196 L. Ed. 2d 351 (2016)).

Specifically, in Salman, Rakoff, considered one of the judiciary's "leading experts on insider trading and white-collar crime", held that any insider who disclosed confidential inside information to his relatives without receiving anything in return was guilty of insider trading, as were his tippees. His holding ran counter to the Second Circuit's controversial decision in United States v. Newman, 773 F.3d 438 (2d Cir. 2014), which had narrowed the definition of insider trading to situations where the government could prove that the tipper had received a direct financial benefit from the tippee in return for disclosing the information.

=== United States v. Cesar Altieri Sayoc ===
In August 2019, Rakoff sentenced Cesar Sayoc, nicknamed "The MAGA Bomber", to 20 years prison for the October 2018 United States mail bombing attempts. Sayoc sent bombs specifically to critics of President Donald Trump, including President Barack Obama, former Vice President Joe Biden, former Secretary of State Hillary Clinton, U.S. Representative Maxine Waters, U.S. Senators Kamala Harris and Cory Booker, former U.S. Attorney General Eric Holder, two former intelligence chiefs (ex-CIA Director John O. Brennan and ex-Director of National Intelligence James Clapper), billionaire Democratic donors and activists George Soros and Tom Steyer, and actor Robert De Niro.

Sayoc had a history of threatening people. Ilya Somin, a law professor at George Mason University and a scholar at the Cato Institute, reported that he was the subject of death threats Sayoc made on Facebook in April 2018. Sayoc threatened to kill Somin and his family and "feed the bodies to Florida alligators". Democratic strategist Rochelle Ritchie had also received a threatening tweet from Sayoc on October 11 that said: "Hug your loved ones real close every time you leave you home."

Sayoc pleaded guilty to 65 felony counts. He said he did not intend for the bombs to explode, but "I was aware of the risk that it would explode." Of the sentencing, Rakoff said, "No one can pretend this is not, in real terms, substantial punishment; but in the Court’s view, it is no more, and no less, than [what] he deserves".

=== State of New York v. U.S. Immigration and Customs Enforcement ===
In September 2019, the State of New York and the Brooklyn District Attorney filed a lawsuit against U.S. Immigration and Customs Enforcement (ICE), challenging its decision to greatly increase the number of immigration arrests conducted in and around New York State courthouses. Before 2017, ICE generally required its officers to avoid enforcement actions at courthouses, with limited exceptions for high-priority removal targets. But beginning in 2017, ICE began conducting immigration arrests at courthouses with much greater frequency. ICE officers began following this new policy on an informal basis after President Trump issued a January 25, 2017, executive order directing federal agencies "to employ all lawful means to ensure the faithful execution of the immigration laws of the United States against all removable aliens." ICE formally set forth its expanded courthouse arrest authority in a January 2018 directive.

This policy proved controversial. After discovery and motion practice, Rakoff granted summary judgment to plaintiffs and enjoined ICE "from conducting any civil arrests on the premises or grounds of New York State courthouses, as well as such arrests of anyone required to travel to a New York State courthouse as a party or witness to a lawsuit." His ruling explained that a longstanding common-law privilege, dating at least to 18th-century England, bars the civil arrest of anyone present at a courthouse, or on courthouse grounds, or necessarily traveling to or from a court proceeding. This privilege was recognized by various U.S. state and federal courts in the 19th and 20th centuries and was presumptively incorporated into the Immigration and Nationality Act. Rakoff held that ICE violated the Administrative Procedure Act by exceeding its statutory authority and acting arbitrarily and capriciously when it conducted such arrests.

=== League of United Latin American Citizens v. Michael Regan ===
In 2021, sitting by designation on the Ninth Circuit, Rakoff wrote an opinion ordering the EPA either to ban the pesticide chlorpyrifos or to modify chlorpyrifos "tolerances" to levels that the agency could affirmatively find safe. Chlorpyrifos was patented by Dow in 1966, and as of 2017 was “the most widely used conventional insecticide in the country.” After the court's ruling, the EPA revoked all tolerances for the pesticide.

Rakoff's opinion ended a 14-year dispute between various nonprofit organizations advocating for conservation, farmworkers' rights, and public health and the EPA. The nonprofits argued that chlorpyrifos posed health risks to infants and children, especially those who were exposed to it in utero. In August 2015, the Ninth Circuit found the EPA's delay in responding to the petition "egregious" and issued a writ of mandamus ordering it "to issue a full and final response to the petition no later than October 31, 2015." Although the EPA missed the initial deadline but published a proposed rule indicating its intent to revoke all chlorpyrifos tolerances, it reversed course after Trump took office, abandoning the proposed rule and denying the nonprofits' petition. The nonprofits objected, and the EPA failed to rule on those objections for another two years. When the EPA finally denied the nonprofits' objections in July 2019, the organizations petitioned for review in the Ninth Circuit.

Rakoff's opinion granting that petition, which has been called "a withering attack on the Trump administration E.P.A." and "an overwhelming victory" for the nonprofits, criticized the EPA on both procedural and substantive grounds. Rakoff wrote, "the EPA has sought to evade, through one delaying tactic after another, its plain statutory duties." The court also found that the EPA's denial of the 2007 petition was substantively unsound or, in the language of administrative law, "arbitrary and capricious."

Notably, the court held that, regardless of the evidence before the agency, the EPA violated its statutory duties by denying the petition without weighing in on chlorpyrifos's safety. The court clarified the standard applicable to cases in which the EPA rules on a petition to revoke a tolerance, explaining that the Federal Food, Drug, and Cosmetic Act "imposes a continuous duty upon the EPA by permitting it to leave in effect a tolerance only if it finds it is safe." Environmental groups expressed "relief" at the court’s ruling.

After the court's ruling, on August 18, 2021, the EPA announced a final rule "revoking all tolerances for residues of chlorpyrifos." Rakoff was joined in the majority by Judge Jacqueline Nguyen. Judge Jay Bybee dissented.

=== United States v. Schultz ===
Frederick Schultz, a New York City art dealer, was convicted of conspiring to receive stolen antiquities, including an ancient Egyptian sculpture of the head of Pharaoh Amenhotep III. Schultz and one of his co-conspirators, Jonathan Tokeley-Parry, had arranged for the antiquities to be smuggled out of Egypt, created false provenances for them, and attempted to sell them to private collectors. In 1992, Egyptian authorities began investigating the duo, which resulted in Tokeley-Parry’s arrest in Great Britain and Schultz's arrest in the United States.

In 2002, Rakoff presided over Schultz's jury trial, which lasted ten days. The jury convicted Schultz, and Rakoff sentenced him to 33 months' imprisonment.

The primary legal issue in the case was whether the National Stolen Property Act, a federal statute that outlaws trafficking in stolen merchandise that has crossed state lines or the U.S. border, could be applied to antiquities that belonged to the government of Egypt under that country's patrimony law. In 1983, Egypt enacted a statute declaring that antiquities are public property, may not be privately possessed, and may not be traded. Schultz moved to dismiss the indictment against him primarily on the ground that Egypt's patrimony statute was a mere regulatory provision, not a true assertion of state ownership of antiquities. Rakoff rejected this argument, holding that the statute indeed transferred ownership of Egypt's antiquities to the state. Moreover, Rakoff held, there was no reason to conclude that U.S. law does not recognize property interests created by foreign patrimony statutes such as Egypt's.

The U.S. Court of Appeals for the Second Circuit unanimously affirmed Rakoff's ruling, concluding that U.S. courts "are capable of evaluating foreign patrimony laws" and that Rakoff had "carefully evaluated" the Egyptian statute at issue. Many books about art theft have cited the ruling as a benchmark.

=== United States v. Al Kassar ===
In 2008, Rakoff presided over the jury trial of Monzer al Kassar, then one of the world's leading private purveyors of arms, and the trials of two of his associates. Al Kassar, a Syrian national sometimes known as the "Prince of Marbella", was arrested after undercover Drug Enforcement Administration agents set up a sting operation in which they posed as members of the international terrorist organization Fuerzas Armadas Revolucionarias de Colombia (FARC) and attempted to purchase millions of dollars of anti-aircraft missiles from al Kassar. The indictment charged that al Kassar and his associates had conspired to kill nationals, officers, and employees of the United States; acquire and use anti-aircraft missiles; and provide material support and resources to FARC. After a ten-day trial, the jury convicted al Kassar on all counts, and Rakoff sentenced him to 30 years in prison.

Before trial, al Kassar argued that federal agents had improperly attempted to entrap him and that prosecuting him in the U.S. violated his due process rights because there was an insufficiently strong connection between his conduct and the U.S. Rakoff rejected these and other challenges to the indictment. He held that, far from entrapping al Kassar, the DEA agents at most created an opportunity for him to engage in criminal conduct that he was already willing to commit. Rakoff also held that, because al Kassar agreed to sell weapons to a terrorist organization with the express purpose of killing innocent U.S. nationals, U.S. jurisdiction was appropriate.

The Second Circuit Court of Appeals affirmed al Kassar's conviction and Rakoff's reasoning, evidentiary rulings, and jury instructions. Al Kassar subsequently filed four motions for a reduction in his sentence, all of which Rakoff denied.

=== Epstein litigation ===
Rakoff presided over several streams of litigation related to the sex trafficking operation masterminded by Jeffrey Epstein. The cases before Rakoff were among the first in which financiers of serial sexual predators were brought to justice. An anonymous woman, "Jane Doe", and the Government of the United States Virgin Islands both filed civil lawsuits against JPMorgan Chase, alleging that the bank played a role in facilitating Epstein's crimes. Another anonymous woman separately sued Deutsche Bank on a similar theory.

The JPMorgan plaintiffs alleged that the bank and its subsidiaries enabled Epstein to access the cash necessary to fuel his sex-trafficking operation, failed to file "suspicious activity reports", and provided a private jet that transported young women and girls to Epstein's home in New York. The plaintiffs contended that JPMorgan knew or should have known that Epstein was a sexual predator, and alleged that a senior bank executive who serviced Epstein's account, James (“Jes”) Staley, exercised his influence to ensure that JPMorgan kept Epstein as a client. (JPMorgan, in turn, sued Staley, claiming that he had concealed the truth about Epstein from the bank. Rakoff denied Staley's motion to dismiss the bank's lawsuit; it later settled.)

After JPMorgan terminated its client relationship with Epstein, Deutsche Bank took him on as a client in 2013. In the litigation against Deutsche Bank, the plaintiff alleged that, despite receiving red flags about Epstein's behavior, the bank helped him evade authorities' notice.

In a detailed May 2023 opinion, Rakoff granted in part and denied in part the banks' motions to dismiss. Among other things, he left intact the plaintiffs' core claims under the Trafficking Victims Protection Act but dismissed their claims under federal and territorial racketeering statutes. Soon after Rakoff issued his ruling, the cases settled. JPMorgan Chase agreed to pay $290 million to Epstein's victims and $75 million to the Virgin Islands, and Deutsche Bank agreed to pay $75 million to Epstein's victims. "This is, in the Court's view, a terrific settlement", Rakoff said in court.

=== SEC v. Terraform Labs Pte. Ltd. ===
In a major cryptocurrency case, Rakoff held that crypto assets can be securities for purposes of U.S. securities laws.

SEC v. Terraform arose out of the collapse of Terraform, which created and marketed such crypto assets as LUNA and UST. Terraform advertised several of its coins, including UST, by claiming that they were governed by a secret, sophisticated algorithmic trading mechanism that operated to prevent the trading price of a stablecoin purchased for $1 from ever falling below that price. Terraform's proposition was that a purchaser could make a lot of money if the demand for tokens to which a stablecoin was linked increased, but that the purchaser would never lose money because the trading price would never fall below the purchase price. One morning in 2021, the price of a Terraform token fell to about 90 cents but immediately rebounded to above $1, and investors began to believe Terraform's hype.

The Securities and Exchange Commission alleged Terraform had engaged in fraud. It contended that the price rebounded so swiftly because Terraform co-founder and CEO Do Kwon arranged for a huge secret investment in the tokens. When the SEC's allegations became public, the price of the tokens fell to as low as 11 cents and investors lost more than $40 billion.

The key legal issue in the case was whether Terraform's crypto assets were securities. Rakoff held that they were. He applied a test that the U.S. Supreme Court established in SEC v. W. J. Howey Co., concluding that the tokens, as Terraform had structured and marketed them, were investment contracts because they represented an "investment of money ... in a common enterprise ... with profits to be derived solely from the efforts of others". Because he held that the crypto assets were securities, Rakoff also concluded, as a matter of law, that Terraform violated U.S. securities laws by offering and selling unregistered securities. He sent the SEC's separate fraud claims to trial, at which the jury found Terraform liable for fraud in April 2024. In June 2024, Terraform and Kwon agreed to settle the case by paying more than $4.5 billion in disgorgement, penalties, and interest. In 2025, Kwon pleaded guilty to federal fraud charges.

Because the parties settled, Rakoff's ruling that Terraform's tokens were securities was not reviewed on appeal. Not every court addressing crypto assets has agreed with his reasoning, and the question remains unresolved.

=== United States v. Ramsay ===
Rakoff's interest in neuroscience and related fields has shaped his approach to criminal law. In 2021, he granted a sentence reduction to Andrew Ramsay, who was convicted of murder in aid of racketeering in connection with a 1992 gang-related shooting. Ramsay, then 18 years old, and his co-defendants shot up a Labor Day block party in the Bronx. Under the First Step Act, Rakoff reduced Ramsay's sentence from life imprisonment to 30 years.

Rakoff's opinion, which has since been cited by more than 80 federal courts, explored why "youth matters in sentencing". Rakoff collected insights from neuroscientific, psychological, and sociological research about such adolescent attributes as immaturity, susceptibility, salvageability, and dependence. He said these attributes merit careful consideration by sentencing judges because, among other things, "Adolescents' immaturity, their susceptibility to peer influence, and their dependence mean their irresponsible conduct is not as morally reprehensible as that of an adult." In addition, because adolescents slowly but steadily develop self-control, rehabilitation and reintegration into society may be more likely for them than for older defendants.

Applying these principles, Rakoff held that Ramsay's youth, upbringing, and rehabilitation were all "highly relevant" to his culpability for the 1992 shooting. Moreover, Rakoff noted that a sentence of life in prison was mandatory at the time Ramsay was sentenced and argued that, in light of Ramsay's circumstances, the mandatory life sentence was also a compelling reason to reduce his sentence.

== Writings ==
Rakoff has regularly contributed to The New York Review of Books since 2014. He has also written over 200 published articles, delivered more than 900 speeches, and published several satirical poems. He is the author of Why the Innocent Plead Guilty and the Guilty Go Free: And Other Paradoxes of Our Broken Legal System (Farrar, Straus and Giroux, 2021), and he is co-author of five other books.

=== Articles ===
- Jed S. Rakoff, "It's a Racket!", The New York Review of Books, vol.LXXII, no. 20 (December 18, 2025), pp. 61–62. "Cryptocurrency ... has often become a vehicle for fraud and criminality. ... The only way a cryptocurrency investor could make money was by selling his tokens when their price rose. And such selling, untethered to any underlying economic reality, could cause the price of Bitcoin to fall rapidly, as it did ... in 2022, leading to billions of dollars in losses." (p. 61.)

== Personal ==
Rakoff has been married since 1974 to Dr. Ann R. Rakoff, a child development specialist. They have three daughters and three grandchildren. Their hobby is ballroom dancing. He is Jewish.

His older brother was murdered in 1985.

Rakoff is a longstanding fan of the New York Yankees, and keeps a baseball signed by Mariano Rivera in a glass case on his desk.

== See also ==
- List of Jewish American jurists

Legal offices
| Preceded by David Norton Edelstein | Judge of the United States District Court for the Southern District of New York; 1996–2010 | Succeeded by Katherine B. Forrest |
