= David Norton Edelstein =

American judge (1910–2000)

Senior Judge of the United States District Court for the Southern District of New York
- In office November 1, 1994 – August 19, 2000

Chief Judge of the United States District Court for the Southern District of New York
- In office 1971–1980
- Preceded by: Sidney Sugarman
- Succeeded by: Lloyd Francis MacMahon

Judge of the United States District Court for the Southern District of New York
- In office November 1, 1951 – November 1, 1994
- Appointed by: Harry S. Truman
- Preceded by: Alfred Conkling Coxe Jr.
- Succeeded by: Jed S. Rakoff

Personal details
- Born: David Norton Edelstein; February 16, 1910 New York City, US
- Died: August 19, 2000 (aged 90) New York City, US
- Education: Fordham University (B.S., M.A.); Fordham University School of Law (LL.B.)

David Norton Edelstein (February 16, 1910 – August 19, 2000) was a United States district judge of the United States District Court for the Southern District of New York from 1951 to 2000 and its Chief Judge from 1971 to 1980.

== Education and career ==
Born in New York City, New York, Edelstein received a Bachelor of Science degree and a Master of Arts degree from Fordham University, and a Bachelor of Laws from Fordham University School of Law. He entered private practice in New York City. He was an attorney in the Claims Division of the United States Department of Justice in 1944. He was an Assistant United States Attorney for the Southern District of New York from 1945 to 1947. He was a Special Assistant to the United States Attorney General of the Lands Division from 1947 to 1948, and an Assistant United States Attorney General of the Customs Division from 1948 to 1951.

== Federal judicial service ==
Edelstein received a recess appointment from President Harry S. Truman on November 1, 1951, to a seat on the United States District Court for the Southern District of New York vacated by Judge Alfred Conkling Coxe Jr. He was nominated to the same position by President Truman on January 30, 1952. He was confirmed by the United States Senate on April 7, 1952, and received his commission on April 8, 1952. He served as Chief Judge from 1971 to 1980. He was a member of the Judicial Conference of the United States from 1971 to 1974. He assumed senior status on November 1, 1994. He was the last federal judge in active service to have been appointed by President Truman. His service terminated on August 19, 2000, due to his death in New York City.

== See also ==
- List of Jewish American jurists
- List of United States federal judges by longevity of service

== Sources ==
Legal offices
| Preceded by Alfred Conkling Coxe Jr. | Judge of the United States District Court for the Southern District of New York; 1951–1994 | Succeeded by Jed S. Rakoff |
| Preceded by Sidney Sugarman | Chief Judge of the United States District Court for the Southern District of New York; 1971–1980 | Succeeded by Lloyd Francis MacMahon |
