= United States District Court for the Southern District of New York =

United States federal district court

Coordinates: 40°42′49″N 74°00′03″W

- (S.D.N.Y.)

- Geographic boundaries of the district
- Location: Daniel Patrick Moynihan U.S. Courthouse (Manhattan) More locations: Thurgood Marshall U.S. Courthouse (Manhattan); Charles L. Brieant Jr. Federal Building and Courthouse (White Plains); Middletown
- Appeals to: Second Circuit
- Established: April 9, 1814
- Judges: 28
- Chief Judge: Laura Taylor Swain

Officers of the court
- U.S. Attorney: James M. McDonald (acting)
- U.S. Marshal: Ricky J. Patel
- nysd.uscourts.gov

The United States District Court for the Southern District of New York (in case citations, S.D.N.Y.) is a federal trial court whose geographic jurisdiction encompasses eight counties of the state of New York. Two of these are in New York City: New York (Manhattan) and the Bronx; six are in the Hudson Valley: Westchester, Putnam, Rockland, Orange, Dutchess, and Sullivan. Appeals from the Southern District of New York are taken to the United States Court of Appeals for the Second Circuit (except for patent claims and claims against the U.S. government under the Tucker Act, which are appealed to the Federal Circuit).

Because it covers Manhattan, the Southern District of New York has long been one of the most prestigious and influential federal trial courts in the United States. It often has jurisdiction over America's largest financial institutions and prosecution of white-collar crime and other federal crimes. Because of its age (being the oldest federal court in the history of the United States) and great influence (described as "the preeminent trial court in the nation"), it is colloquially called the "Mother Court".

The district itself has had several prominent judges on its bench, including Learned Hand, Michael Mukasey, and Sonia Sotomayor, and many of the U.S. attorneys for the district have been prominent American legal and political figures, such as Elihu Root, Henry L. Stimson, Robert Morgenthau, Rudy Giuliani, James Comey, Michael J. Garcia, and Preet Bharara.

== Jurisdiction ==
The United States District Court for the Southern District of New York encompasses the counties of New York, Bronx, Westchester, Rockland, Putnam, Orange, Dutchess, and Sullivan and draws jurors from those counties. The Court also shares concurrent jurisdiction over the waters of the counties of Kings, Nassau, Queens, Richmond, and Suffolk with the United States District Court for the Eastern District of New York. The Court hears cases in Manhattan, White Plains, and Poughkeepsie, New York.

The United States Attorney's Office for the Southern District of New York represents the United States in civil and criminal litigation in the Court. As of February 13, 2025, the United States Attorney is Matthew Podolsky.

The court sits in the Thurgood Marshall United States Courthouse and Daniel Patrick Moynihan United States Courthouse, both in Manhattan, and in the Charles L. Brieant Jr. Federal Building and Courthouse in White Plains.

== History ==
The United States District Court for the District of New York was one of the original 13 courts established by the Judiciary Act of 1789, 1 Stat. 73, on September 24, 1789. It first sat at the old Merchants Exchange on Broad Street in November 1789, the first federal court to do so. The Act of April 9, 1814, 3 Stat. 120, divided the District of New York into Northern and Southern Districts.

The subdivision of the district was reportedly instigated by Matthias B. Tallmadge, out of antipathy for fellow district judge William P. Van Ness. These Districts were later further subdivided with the creation of the Eastern District on February 25, 1865, by 13 Stat. 438, and the Western District on May 12, 1900, by 31 Stat. 175. Public Law 95-408 (enacted October 2, 1978) transferred Columbia, Greene, and Ulster counties from the Southern to the Northern district.

For the first hundred years of its existence, the case load of the district was dominated first by admiralty cases, and then by a mix of admiralty and bankruptcy cases. The primary responsibility for hearing bankruptcy cases has since been transferred to the United States Bankruptcy Court for the Southern District of New York, with the District Court only reviewing cases already decided by a bankruptcy judge.

Since its creation, the Southern District of New York has had over 150 judges, more than any other District. Twenty-one judges from the Southern District of New York have been elevated to the United States Court of Appeals for the Second Circuit—Samuel Blatchford, Charles Merrill Hough, Learned Hand, Julius Marshuetz Mayer, Augustus Noble Hand, Martin Thomas Manton, Robert P. Patterson, Harold Medina, Irving Kaufman, Wilfred Feinberg, Walter R. Mansfield, Murray Gurfein, Lawrence W. Pierce, Pierre N. Leval, John M. Walker Jr., Sonia Sotomayor, Denny Chin, Barrington Daniels Parker Jr., Gerard E. Lynch, Richard J. Sullivan, and Alison Nathan. Blatchford and Sotomayor, after being elevated from the Southern District of New York to serve as Circuit Judges for the Second Circuit, were later elevated to the Supreme Court of the United States. The longest serving judge, David Norton Edelstein, served as an active judge for 43 years to the day, and in senior status for an additional six years.

Judges of the court have gone on to other high governmental positions. Robert P. Patterson served as Under Secretary of War under President Franklin Roosevelt and was Secretary of War under President Harry S. Truman. Louis Freeh served as Director of the Federal Bureau of Investigation from September 1993 to June 2001. Michael Mukasey served as the 81st United States Attorney General under President George W. Bush.

== Notable cases ==
- The injury and loss of life claims from the 1912 sinking of the Titanic, the 1915 torpedo attack on the Lusitania and the 1904 fire aboard the General Slocum were heard in the S.D.N.Y.
- The 1949 perjury trial of Alger Hiss was heard in the S.D.N.Y Court.
- The 1951 espionage trial of Julius and Ethel Rosenberg was heard in the S.D.N.Y.
- Judge John M. Woolsey of the S.D.N.Y. rejected government efforts to censor on obscenity grounds the distribution of James Joyce's Ulysses in 1933.
- Judge Murray Gurfein of the Court rejected government efforts to enjoin The New York Times from publishing the Pentagon Papers in 1971.
- Defamation suits were heard in the S.D.N.Y. against CBS and Time magazine by General William Westmoreland and Israeli General Ariel Sharon.
- Two former Attorneys General of the United States were indicted and tried in the S.D.N.Y. for crimes while in office – Harry Daugherty of the Teapot Dome era and John Mitchell of the Watergate era. Juries were unable to reach verdicts in the two trials against Daugherty in 1926; John Mitchell was acquitted in 1974.
- Financial frauds have been prosecuted in the S.D.N.Y., among them the cases against Bernard Madoff, Ivan Boesky, Michael Milken, and Sam Bankman-Fried.
- The 1990 trial of Imelda Marcos, who was the former First Lady of the Philippines, and who was indicted on charges of fraud, racketeering, conspiracy, and obstruction of justice.
- Bombings: the trials of those accused of the 1998 United States embassy bombings in East Africa; those alleged to have been responsible for the 1993 World Trade Center bombing; Omar Abdel Rahman (known in the press as "The Blind Sheikh"); and those who conspired to carry out the Bojinka plot occurred in the District. More recently, the prosecution arising out of the 2010 Times Square car bombing attempt were each heard in the S.D.N.Y.
- Bridgeman v. Corel (1999) established that exact reproductions of public domain paintings were not subject to copyright protection.
- Viacom Inc. v. YouTube Inc., a $1 billion lawsuit against Google and YouTube in 2012 on the grounds of alleged copyright infringement. The DMCA safe harbor law became the main argument in the case.
- Prosecution of Abduwali Muse, the so-called "Somali Pirate", was heard in the Court in 2010.
- The criminal cases against Bess Myerson, Leona Helmsley and Martha Stewart were heard in the S.D.N.Y. as well.
- The Deflategate controversy concerning the National Football League's Tom Brady was heard in the S.D.N.Y. in 2015.
- In 2017, Hosseinzadeh v. Klein, concerning the practice of fair use in online video content, was heard in the S.D.N.Y.
- On December 12, 2018, Judge William H. Pauley III sentenced Michael Cohen – who had served as personal legal counsel to U.S. president Donald Trump for more than a decade – to "three years in prison and millions in forfeitures, restitution and fines", after pleading guilty to charges including campaign finance violations, tax evasion and committing perjury while under oath before Congress.
- Patrick Ho, former Hong Kong Secretary for Home Affairs, bribery And money laundering offenses to Sam Kutesa, former Minister of Foreign Affairs in Uganda and Idriss Déby, former Chad President on behalf of CEFC China Energy.
- Criminal cases against rapper and record producer Sean Combs, and Ghislaine Maxwell, a sex trafficker and confidant of Jeffrey Epstein.
- The E. Jean Carroll v. Donald J. Trump trial, presided over by Senior Judge Lewis A. Kaplan, was held in April and May 2023 in which the jury reached a unanimous decision, after deliberating for less than three hours, that Donald Trump was liable for sexual abuse via forcible digital penetration and defamation. Carroll was awarded a total of $5 million in damages.
- Luigi Mangione, suspect in the killing of UnitedHealthcare CEO Brian Thompson, has a federal case that is being heard in the S.D.N.Y.
- The federal prosecution of former Venezuelan president Nicolas Maduro and his wife, Cilia Flores, on narco-terrorism and drug trafficking charges following their capture by U.S. forces is being heard in the S.D.N.Y, with a trial scheduled for June 2027.

== Current judges ==
As of October 28, 2026:

#	Title	Judge	Duty station	Born	Term of service			Appointed by
#	Title	Judge	Duty station	Born	Active	Chief	Senior	Appointed by
125	Chief Judge	Laura Taylor Swain	Manhattan	1958	2000–present	2021–present	—	Clinton
110	District Judge	John G. Koeltl	Manhattan	1945	1994–present	—	—	Clinton
129	District Judge	Kenneth M. Karas	White Plains	1964	2004–present	—	—	G.W. Bush
135	District Judge	J. Paul Oetken	Manhattan	1965	2011–present	—	—	Obama
136	District Judge	Paul A. Engelmayer	Manhattan	1961	2011–present	—	—	Obama
139	District Judge	Edgardo Ramos	Manhattan	1960	2011–present	—	—	Obama
140	District Judge	Andrew L. Carter Jr.	Manhattan	1969	2011–present	—	—	Obama
141	District Judge	Jesse M. Furman	Manhattan	1972	2012–present	—	—	Obama
142	District Judge	Ronnie Abrams	Manhattan	1968	2012–present	—	—	Obama
144	District Judge	Katherine Polk Failla	Manhattan	1969	2013–present	—	—	Obama
145	District Judge	Analisa Torres	Manhattan	1959	2013–present	—	—	Obama
146	District Judge	Nelson S. Román	White Plains	1960	2013–present	—	—	Obama
147	District Judge	Vernon S. Broderick	Manhattan	1963	2013–present	—	—	Obama
148	District Judge	Gregory H. Woods	Manhattan	1969	2013–present	—	—	Obama
150	District Judge	Mary Kay Vyskocil	Manhattan	1958	2019–present	—	—	Trump
151	District Judge	Lewis J. Liman	Manhattan	1960	2019–present	—	—	Trump
152	District Judge	Philip M. Halpern	White Plains	1956	2020–present	—	—	Trump
153	District Judge	John P. Cronan	Manhattan	1976	2020–present	—	—	Trump
154	District Judge	Jennifer L. Rochon	Manhattan	1970	2022–present	—	—	Biden
155	District Judge	Jennifer H. Rearden	Manhattan	1970	2022–present	—	—	Biden
156	District Judge	Arun Subramanian	Manhattan	1979	2023–present	—	—	Biden
157	District Judge	Jessica G. L. Clarke	Manhattan	1983	2023–present	—	—	Biden
158	District Judge	Dale Ho	Manhattan	1977	2023–present	—	—	Biden
159	District Judge	Margaret Garnett	Manhattan	1971	2024–present	—	—	Biden
160	District Judge	Jeannette Vargas	Manhattan	1973	2024–present	—	—	Biden
161	District Judge	vacant	—	—	—	—	—	—
162	District Judge	vacant	—	—	—	—	—	—
163	District Judge	vacant	—	—	—	—	—	—
79	Senior Judge	Charles S. Haight Jr.	inactive (Note: Judge Haight sat with the District of Connecticut since taking senior status until he went inactive on May 19, 2025.)	1930	1976–1995	—	1995–present	Ford
91	Senior Judge	Louis L. Stanton	Manhattan	1927	1985–1996	—	1996–present	Reagan
97	Senior Judge	Kimba Wood	Manhattan	1944	1988–2009	2006–2009	2009–present	Reagan
102	Senior Judge	Loretta Preska	Manhattan	1949	1992–2017	2009–2016	2017–present	G.H.W. Bush
108	Senior Judge	Denise Cote	Manhattan	1946	1994–2011	—	2011–present	Clinton
109	Senior Judge	Lewis A. Kaplan	Manhattan	1944	1994–2011	—	2011–present	Clinton
113	Senior Judge	Sidney H. Stein	Manhattan	1945	1995–2010	—	2010–present	Clinton
115	Senior Judge	Jed S. Rakoff	Manhattan	1943	1996–2010	—	2010–present	Clinton
117	Senior Judge	Richard M. Berman	Manhattan	1943	1998–2011	—	2011–present	Clinton
119	Senior Judge	Colleen McMahon	Manhattan	1951	1998–2021	2016–2021	2021–present	Clinton
121	Senior Judge	Naomi Reice Buchwald	Manhattan	1944	1999–2012	—	2012–present	Clinton
122	Senior Judge	Victor Marrero	Manhattan	1941	1999–2010	—	2010–present	Clinton
123	Senior Judge	George B. Daniels	Manhattan	1953	2000–2021	—	2021–present	Clinton
126	Senior Judge	P. Kevin Castel	Manhattan	1950	2003–2017	—	2017–present	G.W. Bush
130	Senior Judge	Paul A. Crotty	Manhattan	1941	2005–2015	—	2015–present	G.W. Bush
132	Senior Judge	Cathy Seibel	White Plains	1960	2008–2025	—	2025–present	G.W. Bush
133	Senior Judge	Paul G. Gardephe	Manhattan	1957	2008–2023	—	2023–present	G.W. Bush
134	Senior Judge	Vincent L. Briccetti	White Plains	1954	2011–2023	—	2023–present	Obama
143	Senior Judge	Lorna G. Schofield	Manhattan	1956	2012–2025	—	2025–present	Obama
149	Senior Judge	Valerie E. Caproni	Manhattan	1955	2013–2025	—	2025–present	Obama

== Vacancies and pending nominations ==
Seat	Prior judge's duty station	Seat last held by	Vacancy reason	Date of vacancy	Nominee	Date of nomination
27	Manhattan	Lorna G. Schofield	Senior status	January 1, 2025	—	—
10	Manhattan	Valerie E. Caproni	Senior status	January 7, 2025	—	—
11	White Plains	Cathy Seibel	Senior status	November 3, 2025	—	—

== Former judges ==
#	Judge	Born–died	Active service	Chief Judge	Senior status	Appointed by	Reason for termination
1	William P. Van Ness	1778–1826	1814–1826	—	—	Madison/Operation of law (Note: Initially appointed to the District of New York, reassigned by operation of law to the Southern District of New York on April 9, 1814.)	death
2	Samuel Rossiter Betts	1786–1868	1826–1867	—	—	J.Q. Adams	resignation
3	Samuel Blatchford	1820–1893	1867–1878 (Note: Recess appointment; formally nominated on July 13, 1867, confirmed by the United States Senate on July 16, 1867, and received commission the same day.)	—	—	A. Johnson	elevation
4	William Gardner Choate	1830–1920	1878–1881	—	—	Hayes	resignation
5	Addison Brown	1830–1913	1881–1901 (Note: Recess appointment; formally nominated on October 12, 1881, confirmed by the Senate on October 14, 1881, and received commission the same day.)	—	—	Garfield	retirement
6	George Bethune Adams	1845–1911	1901–1911 (Note: Recess appointment; formally nominated on December 5, 1901, confirmed by the Senate on December 17, 1901, and received commission the same day.)	—	—	McKinley	death
7	George Chandler Holt	1843–1931	1903–1914	—	—	T. Roosevelt	retirement
8	Charles Merrill Hough	1858–1927	1906–1916	—	—	T. Roosevelt	elevation
9	Learned Hand	1872–1961	1909–1924	—	—	Taft	elevation
10	Julius Marshuetz Mayer	1865–1925	1912–1921	—	—	Taft	elevation
11	Augustus Noble Hand	1869–1954	1914–1927	—	—	Wilson	elevation
12	Martin Thomas Manton	1880–1946	1916–1918	—	—	Wilson	elevation
13	John C. Knox	1881–1966	1918–1955	1948–1955	1955–1966	Wilson	death
14	Henry W. Goddard	1876–1955	1923–1954	—	1954–1955	Harding	death
15	Francis A. Winslow	1866–1932	1923–1929	—	—	Harding	resignation
16	William Bondy	1870–1964	1923–1956	1955–1956	1956–1964	Harding	death
17	Thomas D. Thacher	1881–1950	1925–1930	—	—	Coolidge	resignation
18	Frank Joseph Coleman	1886–1934	1927–1934 (Note: Recess appointment; formally nominated on December 6, 1927, confirmed by the Senate on December 19, 1927, and received commission the same day.)	—	—	Coolidge	death
19	John M. Woolsey	1877–1945	1929–1943	—	1943–1945	Hoover	death
20	Francis Gordon Caffey	1868–1951	1929–1947	—	1947–1951	Hoover	death
21	Alfred Conkling Coxe Jr.	1880–1957	1929–1951	—	1951–1957	Hoover	death
22	Robert P. Patterson	1891–1952	1930–1939	—	—	Hoover	elevation
23	George Murray Hulbert	1881–1950	1934–1950	—	—	F. Roosevelt	death
24	Vincent L. Leibell	1883–1968	1936–1954	—	1954–1968	F. Roosevelt	death
25	John William Clancy	1888–1969	1936–1959	1956–1959	1959–1969	F. Roosevelt	death
26	Samuel Mandelbaum	1884–1946	1936–1946	—	—	F. Roosevelt	death
27	Edward Augustus Conger	1882–1963	1938–1954	—	1954–1963	F. Roosevelt	death
28	John Bright	1884–1948	1941–1948	—	—	F. Roosevelt	death
29	Simon H. Rifkind	1901–1995	1941–1950	—	—	F. Roosevelt	resignation
30	Harold Medina	1888–1990	1947–1951	—	—	Truman	elevation
31	Sylvester J. Ryan	1896–1981	1947–1973 (Note: Recess appointment; formally nominated on November 24, 1947, confirmed by the Senate on December 18, 1947, and received commission on December 20, 1947.)	1959–1966	1973–1981	Truman	death
32	Samuel H. Kaufman	1893–1960	1948–1955 (Note: Recess appointment; formally nominated on January 13, 1949, confirmed by the Senate on January 31, 1949, and received commission on February 2, 1949.)	—	1955–1960	Truman	death
33	Irving Kaufman	1910–1992	1949–1961 (Note: Recess appointment; formally nominated on January 5, 1950, confirmed by the Senate on April 4, 1950, and received commission on April 7, 1950.)	—	—	Truman	elevation
34	John F. X. McGohey	1894–1972	1949–1970 (Note: Recess appointment; formally nominated on January 5, 1950, confirmed by the Senate on March 8, 1950, and received commission on March 9, 1950.)	—	1970–1972	Truman	death
35	Gregory Francis Noonan	1906–1964	1949–1964 (Note: Recess appointment; formally nominated on January 5, 1950, confirmed by the Senate on April 25, 1950, and received commission on April 26, 1950.)	—	—	Truman	death
36	Sidney Sugarman	1904–1974	1949–1971 (Note: Recess appointment; formally nominated on January 5, 1950, confirmed by the Senate on April 28, 1950, and received commission on May 1, 1950.)	1966–1971	1971–1974	Truman	death
37	Edward Weinfeld	1901–1988	1950–1988	—	—	Truman	death
38	Thomas Francis Murphy	1905–1995	1951–1970	—	1970–1995	Truman	death
39	Edward Jordan Dimock	1890–1986	1951–1961	—	1961–1986	Truman	death
40	David Norton Edelstein	1910–2000	1951–1994 (Note: Recess appointment; formally nominated on January 30, 1952, confirmed by the Senate on April 7, 1952, and received commission on April 8, 1952.)	1971–1980	1994–2000	Truman	death
41	Archie Owen Dawson	1898–1964	1954–1964	—	—	Eisenhower	death
42	Lawrence Walsh	1912–2014	1954–1957	—	—	Eisenhower	resignation
43	Alexander Bicks	1901–1963	1954–1963	—	—	Eisenhower	death
44	Edmund Louis Palmieri	1907–1989	1954–1972	—	1972–1989	Eisenhower	death
45	William Bernard Herlands	1905–1969	1955–1969 (Note: Recess appointment; formally nominated on January 12, 1956, confirmed by the Senate on June 26, 1956, and received commission on June 27, 1956.)	—	—	Eisenhower	death
46	John M. Cashin	1892–1970	1955–1965 (Note: Recess appointment; formally nominated on January 12, 1956, confirmed by the Senate on March 1, 1956, and received commission on March 2, 1956.)	—	1965–1970	Eisenhower	death
47	Richard Harrington Levet	1894–1980	1956–1966	—	1966–1976	Eisenhower	retirement
48	Frederick van Pelt Bryan	1904–1978	1956–1972	—	1972–1978	Eisenhower	death
49	Lloyd Francis MacMahon	1912–1989	1959–1982	1980–1982	1982–1989	Eisenhower	death
50	Charles Miller Metzner	1912–2009	1959–1977	—	1977–2009	Eisenhower	death
51	Thomas Francis Croake	1902–1978	1961–1972	—	1972–1978	Kennedy	death
52	Dudley Baldwin Bonsal	1906–1995	1961–1976 (Note: Recess appointment; formally nominated on January 15, 1962, confirmed by the Senate on March 16, 1962, and received commission on March 17, 1962.)	—	1976–1995	Kennedy	death
53	Irving Ben Cooper	1902–1996	1961–1972 (Note: Recess appointment; formally nominated on January 15, 1962, confirmed by the Senate on September 20, 1962, and received commission on September 28, 1962.)	—	1972–1996	Kennedy	death
54	Wilfred Feinberg	1920–2014	1961–1966	—	—	Kennedy	elevation
55	Harold R. Tyler Jr.	1922–2005	1962–1975	—	—	Kennedy	resignation
56	Edward Cochrane McLean	1903–1972	1962–1972	—	—	Kennedy	death
57	Inzer Bass Wyatt	1907–1990	1962–1977	—	1977–1990	Kennedy	death
58	John Matthew Cannella	1908–1996	1963–1977	—	1977–1996	Kennedy	death
59	Charles Henry Tenney	1911–1994	1963–1979	—	1979–1994	L. Johnson (Note: Judge Tenney was nominated by President Kennedy but was appointed to the Court by (i.e., received his commission from) President Johnson.)	death
60	Marvin E. Frankel	1920–2002	1965–1978	—	—	L. Johnson	resignation
61	Walter R. Mansfield	1911–1987	1966–1971	—	—	L. Johnson	elevation
62	Constance Baker Motley	1921–2005	1966–1986	1982–1986	1986–2005	L. Johnson	death
63	Milton Pollack	1906–2004	1967–1983	—	1983–2004	L. Johnson	death
64	Morris E. Lasker	1917–2009	1968–1983	—	1983–2009	L. Johnson	death
65	Murray Gurfein	1907–1979	1971–1974	—	—	Nixon	elevation
66	Lawrence W. Pierce	1924–2020	1971–1981	—	—	Nixon	elevation
67	Charles L. Brieant	1923–2008	1971–2007	1986–1993	2007–2008	Nixon	death
68	Arnold Bauman	1914–1989	1971–1974	—	—	Nixon	resignation
69	Lee Parsons Gagliardi	1918–1998	1971–1985	—	1985–1998	Nixon	death
70	Thomas P. Griesa	1930–2017	1972–2000	1993–2000	2000–2017	Nixon	death
71	Whitman Knapp	1909–2004	1972–1987	—	1987–2004	Nixon	death
72	Charles E. Stewart Jr.	1916–1994	1972–1985	—	1985–1994	Nixon	death
73	Robert L. Carter	1917–2012	1972–1986	—	1986–2012	Nixon	death
74	Kevin Duffy	1933–2020	1972–1998	—	1998–2016	Nixon	retirement
75	Robert Joseph Ward	1926–2003	1972–1991	—	1991–2003	Nixon	death
76	William C. Conner	1920–2009	1973–1987	—	1987–2009	Nixon	death
77	Richard Owen	1922–2015	1973–1989	—	1989–2015	Nixon	death
78	Henry Frederick Werker	1920–1984	1974–1984	—	—	Nixon	death
80	Gerard Louis Goettel	1928–2011	1976–1993	—	1993–2011	Ford	death
81	Vincent Lyons Broderick	1920–1995	1976–1988	—	1988–1995	Ford	death
82	Pierre N. Leval	1936–present	1977–1993	—	—	Carter	elevation
83	Robert W. Sweet	1922–2019	1978–1991	—	1991–2019	Carter	death
84	Leonard B. Sand	1928–2016	1978–1993	—	1993–2016	Carter	death
85	Mary Johnson Lowe	1924–1999	1978–1991	—	1991–1999	Carter	death
86	Abraham David Sofaer	1938–present	1979–1985	—	—	Carter	resignation
87	John E. Sprizzo	1934–2008	1981–2000	—	2000–2008	Reagan	death
88	Shirley Wohl Kram	1922–2009	1983–1993	—	1993–2009	Reagan	death
89	John F. Keenan	1929–2024	1983–1996	—	1996–2024	Reagan	death
90	Peter K. Leisure	1929–2013	1984–1997	—	1997–2013	Reagan	death
92	John M. Walker Jr.	1940–present	1985–1989	—	—	Reagan	elevation
93	Miriam Cedarbaum	1929–2016	1986–1998	—	1998–2016	Reagan	death
94	Richard J. Daronco	1931–1988	1987–1988	—	—	Reagan	death
95	Michael Mukasey	1941–present	1987–2006	2000–2006	2006	Reagan	retirement
96	Kenneth Conboy	1938–present	1987–1993	—	—	Reagan	resignation
98	Robert P. Patterson Jr.	1923–2015	1988–1998	—	1998–2015	Reagan	death
99	John S. Martin Jr.	1935–present	1990–2003	—	2003	G.H.W. Bush	retirement
100	Lawrence M. McKenna	1933–2023	1990–2002	—	2002–2023	G.H.W. Bush	death
101	Louis Freeh	1950–present	1991–1993	—	—	G.H.W. Bush	resignation
103	Sonia Sotomayor	1954–present	1992–1998	—	—	G.H.W. Bush	elevation
104	Allen G. Schwartz	1934–2003	1993–2003	—	—	Clinton	death
105	Deborah Batts	1947–2020	1994–2012	—	2012–2020	Clinton	death
106	Harold Baer Jr.	1933–2014	1994–2004	—	2004–2014	Clinton	death
107	Denny Chin	1954–present	1994–2010	—	—	Clinton	elevation
111	Barrington D. Parker Jr.	1944–present	1994–2001	—	—	Clinton	elevation
112	Shira Scheindlin	1946–present	1994–2011	—	2011–2016	Clinton	retirement
114	Barbara S. Jones	1947–present	1995–2012	—	2012–2013	Clinton	retirement
116	Richard C. Casey	1933–2007	1997–2007	—	—	Clinton	death
118	Alvin Hellerstein	1933–2026	1998–2011	—	2011–2026	Clinton	death
120	William H. Pauley III	1952–2021	1998–2018	—	2018–2021	Clinton	death
124	Gerard E. Lynch	1951–present	2000–2009	—	—	Clinton	elevation
127	Richard J. Holwell	1946–present	2003–2012	—	—	G.W. Bush	resignation
128	Stephen C. Robinson	1957–present	2003–2010	—	—	G.W. Bush	resignation
131	Richard J. Sullivan	1964–present	2007–2018	—	—	G.W. Bush	elevation
137	Katherine B. Forrest	1964–present	2011–2018	—	—	Obama	resignation
138	Alison Nathan	1972–present	2011–2022	—	—	Obama	elevation

== Chief judges ==
Chief Judge
Knox	1948–1955
Bondy	1955–1956
Clancy	1956–1959
Ryan	1959–1966
Sugarman	1966–1971
Edelstein	1971–1980
MacMahon	1980–1982
Motley	1982–1986
Brieant	1986–1993
Griesa	1993–2000
Mukasey	2000–2006
Wood	2006–2009
Preska	2009–2016
McMahon	2016–2021
Swain	2021–present

Chief judges have administrative responsibilities with respect to their district court. Unlike the Supreme Court, where one justice is specifically nominated to be chief, the office of chief judge rotates among the district court judges. To be chief, a judge must have been in active service on the court for at least one year, be under the age of 65, and have not previously served as chief judge.

A vacancy is filled by the judge highest in seniority among the group of qualified judges. The chief judge serves for a term of seven years, or until age 70, whichever occurs first. The age restrictions are waived if no members of the court would otherwise be qualified for the position.

When the office was created in 1948, the chief judge was the longest-serving judge who had not elected to retire, on what has since 1958 been known as senior status, or declined to serve as chief judge. After August 6, 1959, judges could not become or remain chief after turning 70 years old. The current rules have been in operation since October 1, 1982.

== Succession of seats ==
Seat 1
Seat reassigned from the District of New York on April 9, 1814
Van Ness	1814–1826
Betts	1826–1867
Blatchford	1867–1878
Choate	1878–1881
Brown	1881–1901
Adams	1901–1911
Mayer	1912–1921
Bondy	1923–1956
Bryan	1956–1972
Ward	1972–1991
Preska	1992–2017
Vyskocil	2019–present

Seat 2
Seat established on February 9, 1903 by 32 Stat. 805
Holt	1903–1914
A. Hand	1914–1927
Coleman	1927–1934
Hulbert	1934–1950
Dimock	1951–1961
McLean	1962–1972
Owen	1973–1989
Batts	1994–2012
Broderick	2013–present

Seat 3
Seat established on May 26, 1906 by 34 Stat. 202
Hough	1906–1916
Manton	1916–1918
Knox	1918–1955
Levet	1956–1966
Lasker	1968–1983
Walker, Jr.	1985–1989
Sotomayor	1992–1998
Marrero	1999–2010
A. Carter, Jr.	2011–present

Seat 4
Seat established on March 2, 1909 by 35 Stat. 685
L. Hand	1909–1924
Thacher	1925–1930
R. Patterson, Sr.	1930–1939
Rifkind	1941–1950
Weinfeld	1950–1988
Martin, Jr.	1990–2003
Robinson	2003–2010
Ramos	2011–present

Seat 5
Seat established on September 14, 1922 by 42 Stat. 837 (temporary)
Seat made permanent on August 19, 1935 by 49 Stat. 659
Goddard	1923–1954
Dawson	1954–1964
Motley	1966–1986
Wood	1988–2009
Briccetti	2011–2023
Garnett	2024–present

Seat 6
Seat established on September 14, 1922 by 42 Stat. 837 (temporary)
Winslow	1923–1929
Seat made permanent on August 19, 1935 by 49 Stat. 659
Leibell	1936–1954
Bicks	1954–1963
Tenney	1963–1979
Sprizzo	1981–2000
Lynch	2000–2009
Engelmayer	2011–present

Seat 7
Seat established on February 26, 1929 by 45 Stat. 1317
Woolsey	1929–1943
Seat abolished on December 31, 1943 (temporary judgeship expired)

Seat 8
Seat established on February 26, 1929 by 45 Stat. 1317
Caffey	1929–1947
Ryan	1947–1973
Werker	1974–1984
Stanton	1985–1996
Hellerstein	1998–2011
Furman	2012–present

Seat 9
Seat established on February 26, 1929 by 45 Stat. 1317
Coxe, Jr.	1929–1951
Edelstein	1952–1994
Rakoff	1996–2010
Forrest	2011–2018
Ho	2023–present

Seat 10
Seat established on June 15, 1936 by 49 Stat. 1491
Clancy	1936–1959
Metzner	1959–1977
Sand	1978–1993
Parker Jr.	1994–2001
Holwell	2003–2012
Caproni	2013–2025
vacant	2025–present

Seat 11
Seat established on June 15, 1936 by 49 Stat. 1491
Mandelbaum	1936–1946
Medina	1947–1951
Murphy	1951–1970
Gurfein	1971–1974
Haight, Jr.	1976–1995
Casey	1997–2007
Seibel	2008–2025
vacant	2025–present

Seat 12
Seat established on May 31, 1938 by 52 Stat. 585 (temporary)
Seat made permanent on June 8, 1940 by 54 Stat. 253
Conger	1938–1954
Herlands	1955–1969
Pierce	1971–1981
Kram	1983–1993
Koeltl	1994–present

Seat 13
Seat established on March 24, 1940 by 54 Stat. 219 (temporary)
Seat became permanent upon the abolition of Seat 7 on December 31, 1943
Bright	1941–1948
S. Kaufman	1948–1955
Cashin	1955–1965
Mansfield	1966–1971
Knapp	1972–1987
R. Patterson, Jr.	1988–1998
Daniels	2000–2021
Rochon	2022–present

Seat 14
Seat established on August 3, 1949 by 63 Stat. 493
I. Kaufman	1949–1961
Cannella	1963–1977
Lowe	1978–1991
Cote	1994–2011
Failla	2013–present

Seat 15
Seat established on August 3, 1949 by 63 Stat. 493
McGohey	1950–1970
Brieant, Jr.	1971–2007
Gardephe	2008–2023
Vargas	2024–present

Seat 16
Seat established on August 3, 1949 by 63 Stat. 493
Noonan	1950–1964
Frankel	1965–1978
Sofaer	1979–1985
Mukasey	1987–2006
Sullivan	2007–2018
Rearden	2022–present

Seat 17
Seat established on August 3, 1949 by 63 Stat. 493
Sugarman	1950–1971
Stewart, Jr.	1972–1985
Cedarbaum	1986–1998
Buchwald	1999–2012
Torres	2013–present

Seat 18
Seat established on February 10, 1954 by 68 Stat. 8
Walsh	1954–1957
MacMahon	1959–1982
Keenan	1983–1996
McMahon	1998–2021
Clarke	2023–present

Seat 19
Seat established on February 10, 1954 by 68 Stat. 8
Palmieri	1954–1972
Conner	1973–1987
McKenna	1990–2002
Castel	2003–2017
Halpern	2020–present

Seat 20
Seat established on May 19, 1961 by 75 Stat. 80
Croake	1961–1972
R. Carter	1972–1986
Conboy	1987–1993
Jones	1995–2013
Woods III	2013–present

Seat 21
Seat established on May 19, 1961 by 75 Stat. 80
Bonsal	1962–1976
Leval	1977–1993
Stein	1995–2010
Nathan	2011–2022
Subramanian	2023–present

Seat 22
Seat established on May 19, 1961 by 75 Stat. 80
Cooper	1962–1972
Duffy	1972–1998
Berman	1998–2011
Román	2013–present

Seat 23
Seat established on May 19, 1961 by 75 Stat. 80
Feinberg	1961–1966
Pollack	1967–1983
Leisure	1984–1997
Pauley III	1998–2018
Cronan	2020–present

Seat 24
Seat established on May 19, 1961 by 75 Stat. 80
Tyler, Jr.	1962–1975
Broderick	1976–1988
Schwartz	1993–2003
Karas	2004–present

Seat 25
Seat established on May 19, 1961 by 75 Stat. 80
Wyatt	1962–1977
Sweet	1978–1991
Baer, Jr.	1994–2004
Crotty	2005–2015
Liman	2019–present

Seat 26
Seat established on June 2, 1970 by 84 Stat. 294
Bauman	1971–1974
Goettel	1976–1993
Kaplan	1994–2011
Abrams	2012–present

Seat 27
Seat established on June 2, 1970 by 84 Stat. 294
Gagliardi	1971–1985
Daronco	1987–1988
Freeh	1991–1993
Scheindlin	1994–2011
Schofield	2012–2025
vacant	2025–present

Seat 28
Seat established on June 2, 1970 by 84 Stat. 294
Griesa	1972–2000
Swain	2000–present

Seat 29
Seat established on December 1, 1990 by 104 Stat. 5089
Chin	1994–2010
Oetken	2011–present

== See also ==
- Courts of New York
- For the People, a 2018 fictional television drama about the lawyers and judges of the Southern District
- List of current United States district judges
- List of judges of the United States Bankruptcy Court for the Southern District of New York
- Legal affairs of Donald Trump (disambiguation)
- List of United States federal courthouses in New York
