= Rivlin =

Rivlin (Hebrew: ריבלין) is an illustrous Jewish family originating from Shklov in the Polish-Lithuanian Commonwealth. The family belonged to the Litvak Jewish intellectual tradition. In early 19th century several family members relocated to Palestine in the Ottoman Empire (now Israel) and held major positions in the local Ashkenazi community. The family has branches in Israel and in several other countries.

== The family ==
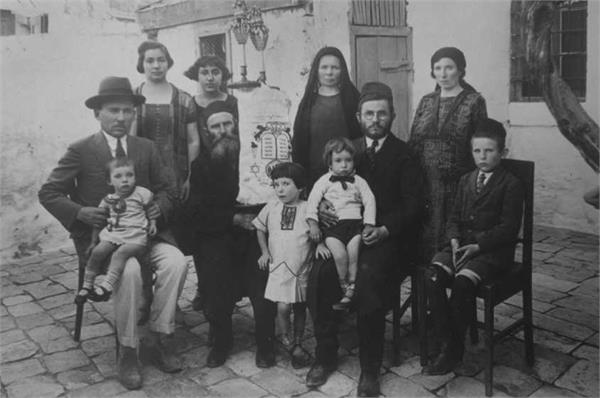
Moshe Rivlin and Rivlin and Eisenman (Rivlin's mother) families, Even Yisrael, Jerusalem (1927)

The Rivlin family has held major reunions in Jerusalem in 1980 and 2009. These reunions drew thousands of family members to Jerusalem. A film, The Tribe, was made about the 1980 reunion by Lilly Rivlin.

== Notable Rivlins ==
Chronologically:

- Hillel Rivlin (1758–1838), rabbi and student of the Vilna Gaon, revitalized the Ashkenazi community in Palestine
- Yosef Rivlin (1836–1896), rabbi and secretary of the Jerusalem-based Central Committee of Knesseth Israel under Jerusalem Chief Rabbi Shmuel Salant
- Yosef Yoel Rivlin (1889–1971), Oriental studies scholar, Hebrew U. professor and translator
- Ronald Rivlin (1915–2005), Anglo-American physicist, developer of the Mooney-Rivlin model for calculating the mechanical behaviour of rubber and similar materials
- Jule Rivlin (1917–2002), American college men's basketball coach and professional basketball player
- Theodore J. Rivlin (1926–2006), American mathematician
- Leanne Rivlin (born 1929), an originator of the Environmental Psychology Doctoral Program at the CUNY Graduate Center, USA
- Alice Rivlin (1931–2019), American economist and budget official
- Lilly Rivlin, (born 1936), Israeli filmmaker
- Reuven Rivlin (born 1939), President of Israel
  - Nechama Rivlin (1945–2019), First Lady of Israel
- Eliezer Rivlin (1942–2013), deputy-president of the Supreme Court of Israel and chairman of the Central Elections Committee
- Liora Rivlin (born 1944), Israeli actress
- Sefi Rivlin (1947–2013), Israeli actor and comedian
- Gary Rivlin (born 1958), American journalist and author
- Michal Rivlin-Etzion, Israeli neuroscientist (graduated from the Hebrew University in 2001)

== See also ==
- Related surnames
  - Rifkind
  - Rivkin
  - Rivkind
