= Rifkind =

Surname

Rifkind is a surname. Notable people with the surname include:

- Carole Rifkind (1935–2019), American architectural critic, historian and educator
- Gabrielle Rifkind (born 1953), British psychotherapist and group analyst working in conflict resolution in the Middle East
- Hugo Rifkind (born 1977), writer for The Times, son of Malcolm
- Malcolm Rifkind (born 1946), British Conservative MP and government minister
- Richard Rifkind (1930–2019), American cancer researcher
- Simon H. Rifkind (1901–1995), United States federal judge and trial lawyer
  - Paul, Weiss, Rifkind, Wharton & Garrison, US law firm S. H. Rifkind was a partner in
- Steve Rifkind (born 1962), American music entrepreneur, founder and chairman of Loud Records and of SRC Records

== See also ==
- Related surnames
  - Rifkin
  - Rivkin
- Gary Ruvkun (born 1952), American molecular biologist and Nobel laureate
