= John S. Martin Jr. =

American judge (born 1935)

Senior Judge of the United States District Court for the Southern District of New York
- In office May 31, 2003 – September 30, 2003

Judge of the United States District Court for the Southern District of New York
- In office April 6, 1990 – May 31, 2003
- Appointed by: George H. W. Bush
- Preceded by: Edward Weinfeld
- Succeeded by: Stephen C. Robinson

United States Attorney for the Southern District of New York
- In office May 22, 1980 – June 3, 1983
- President: Jimmy Carter; Ronald Reagan
- Preceded by: William M. Tendy
- Succeeded by: Rudy Giuliani

Personal details
- Born: John S. Martin Jr. May 31, 1935 (age 91) Brooklyn, New York, U.S.
- Education: Manhattan College (BA); Columbia University (LLB)

John S. Martin Jr. (born May 31, 1935) is a former United States district judge of the United States District Court for the Southern District of New York.

== Education and career ==
Born in Brooklyn, New York, Martin received a Bachelor of Arts degree from Manhattan College in 1957 and a Bachelor of Laws from Columbia Law School in 1961. He was a law clerk for Judge Leonard P. Moore of the United States Court of Appeals for the Second Circuit from 1961 to 1962. He was an Assistant United States Attorney of the Southern District of New York from 1962 to 1966. He was in private practice in Nyack, New York from 1966 to 1967. He was an Assistant to the Solicitor General of the United States from 1967 to 1969. He was in private practice in New York City from 1969 to 1980. He was the United States Attorney for the Southern District of New York from 1980 to 1983. He was in private practice in New York City from 1983 to 1990.

== Federal judicial service ==
Martin was a United States District Judge of the United States District Court for the Southern District of New York. Martin was nominated by President George H. W. Bush on January 24, 1990, to a seat vacated by Edward Weinfeld. He was confirmed by the United States Senate on April 5, 1990, and received his commission on April 6, 1990. He assumed senior status on May 31, 2003. Martin served in that capacity until September 30, 2003, due to retirement.

== Post-judicial career ==
After retiring as a US District Judge, he joined Debevoise & Plimpton LLP as of counsel from 2003 to November 2006. In December 2004, amidst growing concerns about Vioxx's cardiovascular risks, Merck paid $21 million for Martin Jr. and his colleagues at Debevoise & Plimpton to investigate. In September 2006, "The Martin Report" was released and found no evidence of wrongdoing by senior management, though it noted errors such as a statistician changing a methodology used to analyze trial results. Merck was satisfied with the report; however, the report faced criticism from some in the press as self-serving. In 2006, Martin joined the firm Martin & Obermaier after leaving Debevoise & Plimpton. He retired from regular practice in September 2020, but continues to perform arbitration and consult on complex litigation.

Legal offices
Preceded by Edward Weinfeld	Judge of the United States District Court for the Southern District of New York; 1990–2003	Succeeded by Stephen C. Robinson
