= Richard Rifkind =

American cancer researcher (1930–2019)

Richard Allen Rifkind
- Born: October 26, 1930; Manhattan, New York
- Died: January 1, 2019 (aged 88); Manhattan, New York
- Education: Yale University (B.S., 1951); Columbia University College of Physicians and Surgeons (M.D., 1955)
- Employer: Memorial Sloan Kettering Cancer Center
- Known for: Cancer research
- Spouse: Carole Rifkind
- Parent(s): Simon H. Rifkind, Adele S. Rifkind

Richard Rifkind (October 26, 1930 – January 1, 2019) was an American cancer researcher.

Rifkind was born in Manhattan, New York, the son of Simon H. Rifkind and his wife Adele (Singer). He graduated from the Loomis School (high school) in 1948. He graduated from Yale University with a Bachelor of Science degree in 1951. The same year he commenced medical school at Columbia University College of Physicians and Surgeons, graduating in 1955. He served as an intern (1956–1957) then as a resident (1957–1961) at Presbyterian Hospital. During 1957–59 he also served in the United States Air Force.

== At Columbia ==
Returning to Columbia University College of Physicians and surgeons, he served as assistant professor 1963–1967, associate professor from 1967 to 1970, and full professor of medicine and of human genetics, 1970–1981. While at Columbia, he "led a broad revision of the medical school curriculum designed to increase the students' understanding of the scientific and research bases that underlay the practice of medicine." He also was director of hematology at Presbyterian Hospital New York City from 1972 to 1981.

== At Memorial Sloan Kettering Cancer Center ==
In 1980 he left Columbia for Memorial Sloan Kettering Cancer Center (hereafter MSKCC), starting out as the department chairman of the Cancer Center. The following year he was appointed director of the MSKCC's graduate school. In 1983 he was appointed chairman and chief scientific officer of the Sloan-Kettering Institute, the experimental research arm of MSKCC. Similar to the restructuring of curriculum which he had led at Columbia, at MSKCC "he presided over a complete overhaul and diversification of the Institute's research faculty towards making the organization 'more advanced and adventurous.'" His personal research was concerned with the control of malignant cell growth, leading to a new class of chemotherapy. He held the positions of director of the graduate school and chairman of the institute until his retirement in 2003, upon which he received the title of chairman emeritus.

In 1993 he was recruited to serve on the board of governors of the New York Academy of Sciences. Academy President Ellis Rubinstein said of Rifkind: "The Academy is incredibly fortunate to have been able to draw upon someone of his stature, who could bring to the role not only a profound understanding of the scientific process, but also the accumulated wisdom of years of experience in leading complex global organizations."

Rifkind also served on the boards of the New York Academy of Medicine and the New York Hall of Science. Having been awarded a John Simon Guggenheim Memorial Foundation fellow in Medicine and Health in 1965, he later served on the foundation's board from 1981 to 2016.

== New York Structural Biology Center ==
With numerous important medical institutions located in Manhattan, Rifkind recognized the possibility of making New York City a leader in medical science. Along with others he was able to convince colleagues and administration of MSKCC to collaborate with other New York institutions in creating the New York Structural Biology Center which embodied his vision of a "shared research enterprise." "The idea of a center owned and operated collectively by nine highly competitive academic institutions was a pioneering social experiment that many viewed as unrealistic. Its overwhelming success created a model that was subsequently replicated...[Rifkind's] vision, his strength and steadfastness of purpose formed the bedrock on which the Center was built." He served as the center's first chairman of the board from 1999 to 2005.

== Filmmaking ==
In 2004 he and his wife made The Venetian Dilemma, a film which explored the conflict between long- and short-term urban interests in Venice. The film observed how through gentrification, native Venetians were being forced to move while the city is being transformed primarily into a tourist destination, while the city's continual sinking contributes to the problems facing the city.

Shortly thereafter, the Rifkinds embarked on a project to document the training of scientists. "It amazed me to learn that making a film is very like doing science...It's a continuous process of asking questions and solving problems. You can't let yourself give up." He spent several years documenting on film the experiences of three young scientists in training in a laboratory at Columbia University, not knowing if the students would fail or succeed in their projects. The resulting film, Naturally Obsessed, received an award from the National Academy of Sciences, was broadcast around the world, and is used as a teaching tool in dozens of universities. One message of the film is that "Failure is an essential step in the pathway to success."

== Personal ==
Rifkind married Carole Lewis on June 24, 1956. They have two children. He died on January 1, 2019, at the age of 88.

== Selected list of works ==
=== Books ===
- Fundamentals of Hematology Chicago: Year Book Medical Publishers, 1986. ISBN 9780815173373

=== Selected articles ===
Rifkind is the author of over 250 articles. The following, in reverse chronological order, are a small selection.

- D.L. Marrocco, W.D. Tilley, T. Bianco-Miotto, A. Evdokiou, H.I. Scher, R.A. Rifkind, P.A. Marks, V.M. Richon, L.M. Butler, "Suberoylanilide hydroxamic acid (vorinostat) represses androgen receptor expression and acts synergistically with an androgen receptor antagonist to inhibit prostate cancer cell proliferation," Molecular Cancer Therapeutics 6, no. 1 (Jan. 2007), p. 51-60.
- M.C. Kutko, R.D. Glick, L.M. Butler, D.C. Coffey, R.A. Rifkind, P.A. Marks, V.M. Richon, M.P. LaQuaglia, "Histone deacetylase inhibitors induce growth suppression and cell death in human rhabdomyosarcoma in vitro," Clinical Cancer Research: An Official Journal Of The American Association For Cancer Research 9, no. 15 (2003), p. 5749-55.
- W.K. Kelly, V.M. Richon, O. O'Connor, T. Curley, B. MacGregor-Curtelli, W. Tong, M. Klang, L. Schwartz, S. Richardson, E. Rosa, M. Drobnjak, C. Cordon-Cordo, J.H. Chiao, R. Rifkind, P.A. Marks, H. Scher, "Phase I clinical trial of histone deacetylase inhibitor: suberoylanilide hydroxamic acid administered intravenously," Clinical Cancer Research: An Official Journal Of The American Association For Cancer Research Sep 1, 2003; vol. 9 (10 Pt 1), pp. 3578-88.
- L.M. Butler, X. Zhou, W.S. Xu, H.I. Scher, R.A. Rifkind, P.A. Marks, V.M. Richon, "The histone deacetylase inhibitor SAHA arrests cancer cell growth, up-regulates thioredoxin-binding protein-2, and down-regulates thioredoxin," Proceedings Of The National Academy Of Sciences Of The United States Of America 99, no. 18 (Sept. 3, 2002), p. 11700-5.
- L.A. Cohen, P.A. Marks, R.A. Rifkind, S. Amin, D. Desai, B. Pittman, V.M. Richon, "Suberoylanilide hydroxamic acid (SAHA), a histone deacetylase inhibitor, suppresses the growth of carcinogen-induced mammary tumors," Anticancer Research 22 no. 3 (May-Jun. 2002), p. 1497-504.
- Paul A. Marks, Richard A. Rifkind, Victoria M. Richon, Ronald Breslow, Thomas Miller & William K. Kelly, "Histone deacetylases and cancer: causes and therapies" Nature Reviews Cancer volume 1 (2001), p. 194-202.
- Lisa M. Butler, David B. Agus, Howard I. Scher, Brian Higgins, Adam Rose, Carlos Cordon-Cardo, Howard T. Thaler, Richard A. Rifkind, Paul A. *Marks and Victoria M. Richon, "Suberoylanilide Hydroxamic Acid, an Inhibitor of Histone Deacetylase, Suppresses the Growth of Prostate Cancer Cells in Vitro and in Vivo," Cancer Research 60 (September 15, 2000)
- Victoria M. Richon, Todd W. Sandhoff, Richard A. Rifkind, and Paul A. Marks, "Histone deacetylase inhibitor selectively induces p21WAF1 expression and gene-associated histone acetylation," PNAS 97, no. 18 (August 29, 2000), p. 10014-10019; https://doi.org/10.1073/pnas.180316197
- Paul A. Marks Victoria M. Richon Richard A. Rifkind, "Histone Deacetylase Inhibitors: Inducers of Differentiation or Apoptosis of Transformed Cells," JNCI: Journal of the National Cancer Institute 92, Issue 15 (2 August 2000), p. 1210–1216. https://doi.org/10.1093/jnci/92.15.1210
- Michael S. Finnin, Jill R. Donigian, Alona Cohen, Victoria M. Richon, Richard A. Rifkind, Paul A. Marks, Ronald Breslow & Nikola P. Pavletich, "Structures of a histone deacetylase homologue bound to the TSA and SAHA inhibitors," Nature 401 (9 September 1999), p. 188-193.
- Victoria M. Richon, Stephane Emiliani, Eric Verdin, Yael Webb, Ronald Breslow, Richard A. Rifkind, and Paul A. Marks, "A class of hybrid polar inducers of transformed cell differentiation inhibits histone deacetylases," PNAS 95, no. 6 (March 17, 1998), p. 3003-3007. https://doi.org/10.1073/pnas.95.6.3003
- Paul A. Marks, Victoria M. Richon, Ronald Breslow, Richard A. Rifkind, "Histone deacetylase inhibitors as new cancer drugs," Current Opinion in Oncology 13, no. 6 (November 2001), p. 477-483.
- R. C. Reuben, R. L. Wife, R. Breslow, R. A. Rifkind, and P. A. Marks, "A new group of potent inducers of differentiation in murine erythroleukemia cells," PNAS 73, no. 3 (March 1, 1976), p. 862-866. https://doi.org/10.1073/pnas.73.3.862

== See also ==
- Naturally Obsessed
