= Rivkin =

Rivkin is a Slavic language-influenced Jewish surname, of matronymic derivation literally meaning "Rivka's", where Rivka is the Hebrew form of the name Rebecca. Other forms include Rifkin (as a recording of a devoiced pronunciation) and Ryvkin (from the Russian-language variant Рывкин; Polish form of this surname is Rywkin).

Notable people with the surname include:

== Rifkin ==
- Adam Rifkin, American film director
- Jay Rifkin, record producer
- Jeremy Rifkin, American public policy writer
- Joel Rifkin, American serial killer
- Joshua Rifkin, conductor and musicologist
- Ron Rifkin, American actor and director
- Stanley Mark Rifkin, holder of the "biggest computer fraud" in the Guinness Book of World Records

== Rivkin ==
- William R. Rivkin (1919–1967), United States Ambassador to Senegal, the Gambia, and Luxembourg
- Robert S. Rivkin (born 1960), deputy mayor of the City of Chicago and former United States Department of Transportation general counsel
- Charles H. Rivkin (born 1962), chief executive officer of the MPAA and former United States ambassador to France
- David W. Rivkin (born 1955), litigation partner at Debevoise & Plimpton LLP
- David B. Rivkin (1956–2024), American conservative
- Jan W. Rivkin, American academic, professor at the Harvard Business School
- Bobby "Z" Rivkin, known as Bobby Z., former drummer for Prince
- David Z (David Rivkin) (1948–2026), American music producer
- Neta Rivkin (born 1991), Israeli rhythmic gymnast
- Rene Rivkin (1944–2005), Australian entrepreneur

== Ryvkin ==
- Vladimir Ryvkin (1928–1989), birth name of Vladimir Sanin, Russian traveler and writer

== See also ==
- Rifkind
- Rivkind
- Rivlin
- Gary Ruvkun (born 1952), American molecular biologist and Nobel laureate
