= Yosef Yoel Rivlin =

Israeli Orientalist, professor, and linguist (1889-1971)

- יוסף־יואל ריבלין
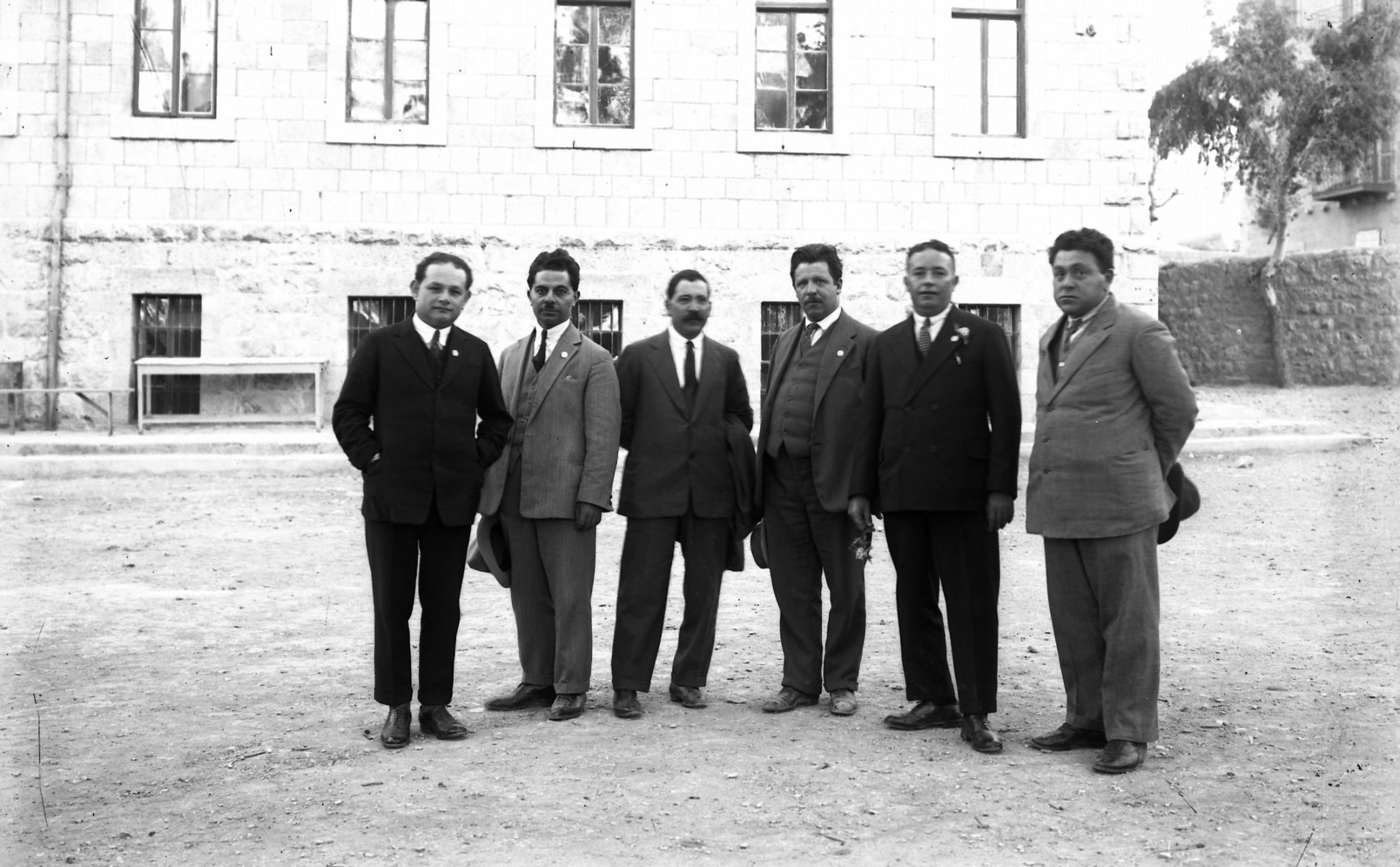
- Writers and teachers in Jerusalem, 1922: Dov Kimhi, David Avisar, Yehuda Burla, Rivlin, Aviezer Yellin and Moshe Carmon
- Born: October 11, 1889; Jerusalem, Ottoman Empire
- Died: April 15, 1971 (aged 81)
- Occupation: Professor
- Spouse: Rachel x2
- Children: Reuven Rivlin

Academic background
- Education: Goethe University Frankfurt

Academic work
- Discipline: History
- Sub-discipline: Oriental studies
- Institutions: Hebrew University of Jerusalem

Yosef Yoel Rivlin (Hebrew: יוסף־יואל ריבלין; 11 October 1889–April 15, 1971) was an Israeli Oriental studies scholar, a professor at the Hebrew University of Jerusalem and a member of the Academy of the Hebrew Language.

== Biography ==
Yosef Yoel Rivlin was born in Jerusalem on October 11, 1889, to Reuven Rivlin, a scion of the Rivlin family, and Ita Rivka Shapira (the sister of the Zionist settler Avraham Shapira), who died when he was born.

He studied in the Talmud Torah of the Etz Chaim Yeshiva, in the Lämel School (often misspelled 'Lemel School'), and at the Ezra teachers college. Later, he was one of the few Jews who studied at the independent Muslim school Rawdat al-Ma'araf (روضة المعارف). He was one of the first teachers in the Teacher's College founded by David Yellin and among the leaders of the supporters of Hebrew medium education in the War of the Languages.

In 1917, he was imprisoned in Damascus after being forcibly conscripted into the Ottoman Military, and after his release he remained there and taught at the Hebrew School for Girls. Together with a group of Jewish educators, he returned to Palestine at the end of 1918, and in January 1919 he was sent back to Damascus by David Yellin to run the Hebrew School for Girls. Together with him, Yehuda Burla was sent to run the Hebrew School for Boys. From Damascus, he frequently wrote in the daily Hebrew newspaper Do'ar HaYom under the pseudonym Mekomi ("Local").

In 1922, he taught in Tiberias. He studied at the University of Frankfurt and received a doctorate in Arabic and Islamic studies. In 1927, he was appointed research assistant at the Hebrew University and was later appointed professor there. In 1929, he was appointed as a member of the Hebrew Language Committee. When it was replaced by the Academy of the Hebrew Language, Rivlin became one of its members, and remained one until his death.

From 1930 to 1941 he served as chairman of the Hebrew Teachers Union.

Rivlin translated Islamic literature into Hebrew, including translation of the Quran (published in 1936) and the Arabian Nights (32 volumes were published between 1947 and 1971. He published studies on the history of the Yishuv and Oriental studies. In 1932, he published "The Life of Muhammad", a Hebrew biography of Muhammad. In 1951 published a Hebrew translation of Ignác Goldziher's Vorlesungen über den Islam.

Since the establishment of Israel, he had been active in the Herut movement. In 1957 he was mentioned as its possible presidential candidate, but withdrew in favor of then incumbent Yitzhak Ben-Zvi.

He chaired the committee to commemorate his childhood friend Dr. Pesach Hebroni and edited his book "Mathematical Writings".

Rivlin was married twice. His first wife was Rachel, the daughter of the educator Yitzhak Yehezkel Yehuda. She died in 1935 with no children. After her death, he married Rachel "Ray" Rivlin, a Jerusalem City Council member, one of the leaders of B'nai B'rith. One of their sons is Reuven Rivlin, the tenth President of Israel.

== Bibliography ==
- Tidhar, David (1947). "Yosef Yoel Rivlin" ד"ר יוסף יואל ריבלין. Encyclopedia of the Founders and Builders of Israel (in Hebrew). Vol. 3. Estate of David Tidhar and Touro College Libraries. p. 1498.
