= Edward Weinfeld =

American judge

Judge of the United States District Court for the Southern District of New York
- In office August 5, 1950 – January 17, 1988
- Appointed by: Harry S. Truman
- Preceded by: Simon H. Rifkind
- Succeeded by: John S. Martin Jr.

Personal details
- Born: May 14, 1901 New York City, New York, U.S.
- Died: January 17, 1988 (aged 86) New York City, New York, U.S.
- Education: New York University (LLB, LLM)
- Awards: Henry J. Friendly Medal (1988)

Edward Weinfeld (May 14, 1901 – January 17, 1988) was a district judge of the United States District Court for the Southern District of New York.

== Early life and career ==
Weinfeld was born on May 14, 1901, in New York City, New York. He received a Bachelor of Laws in 1921 from the New York University School of Law and a Master of Laws in 1922 from the same institution. He served as chief counsel for the New York State Legislative Committee Investigating Bondholders Commission in 1935. He was also the Commissioner of Housing for the State of New York from 1939 to 1942 and Vice President and Director of the Citizens Housing and Planning Council for the State of New York from 1943 to 1950.

Weinfeld's brother was New York assemblyman and judge Morris Weinfeld.

=== Federal judicial service ===
Weinfeld was nominated by President Harry S. Truman on July 10, 1950, to a seat on the United States District Court for the Southern District of New York being vacated by Simon H. Rifkind. He was confirmed by the Senate on August 1, 1950 and received his commission four days later. He was a member of the Judicial Panel on Multidistrict Litigation from 1968 to 1978.

Weinfeld served until his death on January 17, 1988, in New York City.

== See also ==
- List of Jewish American jurists
- List of United States federal judges by longevity of service

== Sources ==
- Edward Weinfeld: A Judicious Life. New York: Federal Bar Foundation, 1998.
- Nelson, William E. (2004). In Pursuit of Right and Justice: Edward Weinfeld as Lawyer and Judge. New York: New York University Press. ISBN 0814758282.
- "Judge Edward Weinfeld, 86, Dies; On U.S. Bench Nearly 4 Decades". New York Times. January 18, 1988.
- This article incorporates facts obtained from the public domain Biographical Directory of Federal Judges compiled by the Federal Judicial Center.

Legal offices
Preceded by Simon H. Rifkind	Judge of the United States District Court for the Southern District of New York; 1950–1988	Succeeded by John S. Martin Jr.
