= Stephen C. Robinson =

American judge (born 1957)

Stephen Craig Robinson

Judge of the United States District Court for the Southern District of New York
- In office September 22, 2003 – August 11, 2010
- Appointed by: George W. Bush
- Preceded by: John S. Martin Jr.
- Succeeded by: Edgardo Ramos

United States Attorney for the District of Connecticut
- In office 1998–2001
- Appointed by: Bill Clinton
- Preceded by: Christopher F. Droney
- Succeeded by: Kevin J. O'Connor

Personal details
- Born: Stephen Craig Robinson; January 25, 1957 (age 69) Brooklyn, New York, U.S.
- Education: Cornell University (BA, JD)

Stephen Craig Robinson (born January 25, 1957) is a former United States district judge who served on the United States District Court for the Southern District of New York from 2003 to 2010.

== Early life and education ==
Robinson was born in Brooklyn, New York. He was raised in a housing project in the Brooklyn neighborhood of Bedford–Stuyvesant. Robinson graduated from John Dewey High School in 1975, and received a Bachelor of Arts degree from Cornell University in 1979 and a Juris Doctor from Cornell Law School in 1984.

== Career ==
Robinson was in private practice in New York City from 1984 to 1987 before becoming an Assistant United States Attorney in the Southern District of New York in 1987. In 1991, he was managing director & associate general counsel for Kroll Associates before moving to the Federal Bureau of Investigation in 1993 where he was principal deputy general counsel & special assistant to the director. In 1995, he became counsel & chief compliance officer for Aetna U.S. Healthcare in Middletown, Connecticut. Appointed United States Attorney for the District of Connecticut in 1998, he served until 2001 after which he was interim manager of Empower New Haven.

=== Federal judicial service ===
Robinson was nominated by President George W. Bush on March 5, 2003, to a seat vacated by John S. Martin Jr. on the United States District Court for the Southern District of New York. He was confirmed by the United States Senate on September 17, 2003, and received commission on September 22, 2003. Robinson, a Democrat, had been recommended to the post by New York Senator Charles Schumer.

On June 25, 2010, The American Lawyer reported that Robinson would be leaving the bench and joining the law firm of Skadden, Arps, Slate, Meagher & Flom as a partner in Skadden's litigation department. He resigned from the bench on August 11, 2010.

=== Notable decisions ===
In May 2009, Robinson sentenced disgraced former New York City Police Commissioner Bernard Kerik to four years in federal prison on eight felonies, including lying to the White House and filing false taxes.

In 2009, Robinson ruled that voting practices in Port Chester, New York, violated the Voting Rights Act and applied a controversial remedy allowing cumulative voting.

== See also ==
- List of African-American federal judges
- List of African-American jurists

== Sources ==
Legal offices
Preceded by John S. Martin Jr.	Judge of the United States District Court for the Southern District of New York; 2003–2010	Succeeded by Edgardo Ramos
