= Lilly Rivlin =

American-Israeli journalist, writer, and filmmaker

Lilly Rivlin (Hebrew: לילי ריבלין) is an American-Israeli journalist, writer, and filmmaker in the genre of documentary/political films on women's issues.

== Early life and education ==
A seventh generation Jerusalemite, Rivlin has lived in the United States most of her life. Her education included a B.A. in foreign affairs from George Washington University (1959) and an M.A. in international relations and Indian studies from the University of California, Berkeley (1962).

== Career ==
After completing a graduate degree at the University of California, Berkeley, she returned to Jerusalem where, among her many activities, she opened Pop-Op, a disco on the second floor of a building on Ben-Yehuda Street in Jerusalem.

Rivlin is a supporter of feminism and non-violent conflict resolution. She is also a follower of Middle Eastern politics and Jewish affairs. She began her prominence as an expert on Jewish history with her work as the principal researcher for the best selling book, O Jerusalem by Larry Collins and Dominique Lapierre. She has contributed to Newsweek, MS., The Washington Post and US Magazine. From 1970–72, she developed a 13-part series, The Jews commissioned by David Puttnam and Sandy Lieberson in London.

Her film credits include producer/interviewer of Israel T.V.’s 18-part series on the history of Zionism, Pillars of Fire; associate producer/ and researcher of If Not Now When, Peace Now; writer/director/producer of The Tribe, 1984, and Miriam’s Daughter’s Now, 1986. Since 2000 her total focus is on making independent documentaries. Her photographic essay entitled When Will The Fighting Stop? was published by Athenaeum, 1991. Ms. Rivlin has been involved in Israeli-Palestinian dialogue since 1967. “I stay committed to Dialogue with other women. I have no other choice.”

Rivlin is listed in Feminists Who Changed America, 1963–1975 (2007) and Jewish Women, A Comprehensive Historical Encyclopedia (2007).

== Awards ==
Rivlin's film Grace Paley: Collected Shorts (2010) was awarded Best Documentary and Audience Award at the Woodstock Film festival as well as at the Starz Denver Film Festival, Washington Jewish Film Festival and others. The film was nominated for the Gotham Film Prize. Most recently she was awarded The Miller Reel Jewish Woman Filmmaker Award 2013).

== Filmography ==
- Esther Broner: A Weave Of Women, (2013). In 1975 Esther Broner and Naomi Nimrod wrote the first Women's Haggadah, leading the way for modern Jewish feminism. For the next 36 years, Esther Broner led the Feminist Seder in NYC with a core group of women. This film documents the evolution of the Jewish feminism through the Feminist Seder. We use archival footage and interviews with leading Jewish feminists who attended the Seder such as Letty Cottin Pogrebin, Gloria Steinem, and Canadian feminist/author Michele Landsberg. At the same time it tells the story of Esther Broner, described by the NY Times as a writer who explored the double marginalization of being Jewish and female. She was “intensely concerned with Jewish spirituality, and with carving out a place for women in a faith tradition that had long seemed not to want them.”

Distributor: Women Make Movies <http://www.wmm.com/filmcatalog/pages/c871.shtml>

- Grace Paley: Collected Shorts, (2010) is an intimate portrait of writer, activist and New York icon Grace Paley (1922–2007), whose frank and brilliant stories celebrating the authentic, daily lives of women are classics of American literature. A child of Russian Jewish refugees who became Poet Laureate of Vermont, State Author of New York, Paley spent a lifetime on the front lines of the feminist, anti-war and nuclear disarmament movements. (USA 74 minutes) color) 28 Awards.
- Can You Hear Me? Israeli And Palestinian Women Fight For Peace (2006), narrated by Debra Winger, depicts the true realities of women who seek peace and change. The film revolves around several Israeli and Palestinian women who have relationships, but focuses on two women, a Palestinian who runs the Women's Center for Legal Aid and Counseling and an Orthodox Jew, who are both convinced that women's efforts can lead the way to dialogue and peace. No matter how desperate the political situation seems, the women in the film never stop communicating with each other. They come together in their bereavement over the loss of loved ones and to demand a better future for their children and grandchildren.
- Gimme a Kiss (2000) Screened at the 2001 Jerusalem Film Festival. A 38-minute film, which raises issues about the destructive power of family secrets. Told from a daughter's point of view, this is an exploration of love in its many contradictory manifestations. Against the backdrop of her aging parents as they lie next to each other in adjoining hospital beds, like two Beckett characters immobilized by sickness, Rivlin seeks to make sense of her parents’ lives. She explores her father's relationship to his family and his infidelities. In searching for answers, she reveals the multiple layers of the human condition as she introduces into the narrative her brother, sister, aunts, her mother's best friend, and her father's mistress, an African-American woman decades his junior who tells of his generosity to the South East community where he had a grocery store.
- Miriam's Daughter's Now (1986) documents Jewish feminists creating new rituals. In the three rituals shown in this video---the Feminist Seder, a baby- girl naming ceremony and a Women's Tashlich, the women speak about their lives and how they felt left out of traditional Jewish rituals, and now they have created rituals for them. Instead of the traditional Passover where women have cooked and men have presided over the Seder, this group of women—mothers and daughters, sisters and friends—reads from a feminist Haggadah. They also choose a theme relevant to their lives and each woman contributes her insights. This Seder has been ongoing for eight years and includes luminaries of the women's movement such as Letty Cottin Pogrebin, Bella Abzug and Gloria Steinem. These rituals demonstrate how traditions can be updated to make women full participants.
- The Tribe (1984) A film about the Rivlin family. Shown on PBS, and Israeli and Italian t.v, is a portrait of a family whose roots stretch back into Eastern Europe, but whose destiny became synonymous with that of Jerusalem to which they immigrated nearly 200 years ago. The story of this extended family as a microcosm of the Jewish saga from 1550 in Eastern Europe to their arrival in Jerusalem all comes together through the vehicle of the Reunion. Two thousand five hundred of the tribe's 10,000 family members gathered in Jerusalem's main conference center to celebrate their ancestor's arrival in Palestine, and, to celebrate each other. Speaker of the Knesset Ruvi Rivlin is interviewed in this film. The filmmaker is his cousin Lilly.

== Publications ==
Books

- Welcome to Israel by Lilly Rivlin with Gila Gevirtz, Behrman House, Inc., Springfield, N.J. 2000
- When Will The Fighting Stop? A Child's View Of Jerusalem. Concept and photographs by Lilly Rivlin. Atheneum, New York. 1990

Articles

Rivlin has written for Newsweek, MS Magazine, The Washington Post, Lear's and US Magazine.

- “Lilith,” Ms. Magazine, Dec, 1972
- “Choosing to Have a Baby on Your Own,” Ms. Magazine, April, 1979
- “Woman Warrior,”(Gen. Amira Dotan), US Magazine, July 16, 1984
- “Peace through Honor,” The Washington Post, Dec. 25, 1973
- “Weary Optimist on Peace Dialogues” LILITH, v.14, No.1, Winter, 1989

Anthologies

- “In the Beginning,” Gates To The New City, edited by Howard Schwartz, Avon, NY. 1983
- “Israel Women In Two Voices: A dialogue between generations,” Lilly Rivlin and Ilana Bet-El, A RISING PUBLIC VOICE-WOMEN IN POLITICS WORLDWIDE, Edited by Alida Brill, The Feminist Press, NY. 1995.
- “Meditation and Conflict” in WOMEN OF THE WALL, an anthology. Editors: Phyllis Chesler and Rivka Haut. Jewish Lights, VT. 2002
- “Feminist Seder-Reflections on Participants Entry Point and Implications,” THE WOMEN’S TABLE: A PASSOVER SEDER SOURCEBOOK, Jewish Lights, VT., 2002. Editors: Rabbi Sharon Cohen Anisfeld, Tara Mohr, Catherine Spector.

== Other credits ==
- Associate Producer of Expulsion And Memory, Director, Simcha Jacobovici; a Canadian production about the Secret Jews, (1995)
- Associate Producer, Full Circle, a film by Paul Rothman; afilm about women on kibbutzim.(1995)
- Associate Producer/writer/researcher, If Not Now When, Peace Now, (1988) Director, Elizabeth Benjamin.
- Producer/interviewer of several segments of Israel T.V.'s 18-part series on the history of Zionism, Pillars Of Fire. (1983)
- Developed/researched/wrote, The Jews, a 13-part T.V. series, for David Puttnam and Sandy Lieberson, in London.(1970–72)
- Consultant, research and credits include Israel: A Nation Is Born, a 5-part series on Israel with Abba Eban (1990) and Jews & The Diaspora, a BBC film (n.d.).
- Principal Researcher of best seller O Jerusalem by Larry Collins and Dominque Lapierre, Simon and Schuster, New York. 1972
