= Reuven Rivlin =

President of Israel from 2014 to 2021

- רְאוּבֵן רִיבְלִין
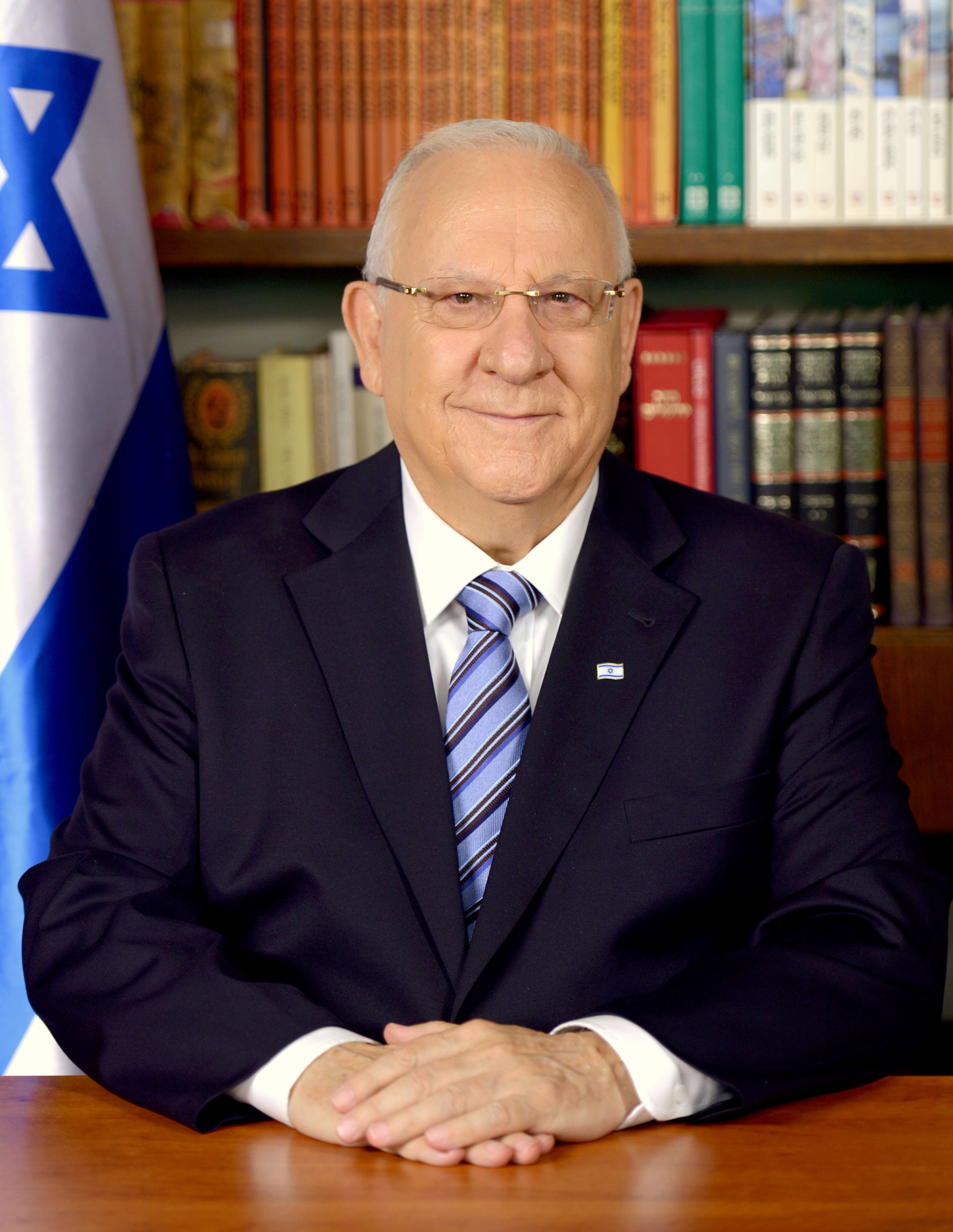
- Official portrait, 2014

10th President of Israel
- In office 24 July 2014 – 7 July 2021
- Prime Minister: Benjamin Netanyahu; Naftali Bennett
- Preceded by: Shimon Peres
- Succeeded by: Isaac Herzog

Speaker of the Knesset
- In office 30 March 2009 – 5 February 2013
- Preceded by: Dalia Itzik
- Succeeded by: Yuli Edelstein
- In office 19 February 2003 – 4 May 2006
- Preceded by: Avraham Burg
- Succeeded by: Dalia Itzik

Minister of Communications
- In office 7 March 2001 – 28 February 2003
- Prime Minister: Ariel Sharon
- Preceded by: Binyamin Ben-Eliezer
- Succeeded by: Ariel Sharon

Member of the Knesset
- In office 1 September 1996 – 11 June 2014
- In office 21 November 1988 – 13 July 1992

Personal details
- Born: 9 September 1939 (age 86) Jerusalem, Mandatory Palestine
- Party: Likud
- Spouse: Nechama Rivlin (m. 1971; died 2019)
- Children: 4
- Education: Hebrew University of Jerusalem

Presidential styles of Reuven "Ruvi" Rivlin
- Reference style: His Excellency, The Honorable כבוד הנשיא
- Spoken style: Your Excellency, Honorable President כבוד הנשיא
- Alternative style: Mr. President אדוני הנשיא

Reuven "Ruvi" Rivlin (Hebrew: רְאוּבֵן "רוּבִי" רִיבְלִין [ʁeʔuˈven ʁivˈlin]; born 9 September 1939) is an Israeli politician and lawyer who served as the president of Israel between 2014 and 2021. He is a member of the Likud party. Rivlin was Minister of Communications from 2001 to 2003, and subsequently served as Speaker of the Knesset from 2003 to 2006 and 2009 to 2013. On 10 June 2014, he was elected President of Israel. His term ended on 7 July 2021.

Rivlin argues for a Greater Israel that would embrace all people and give the Palestinians of the West Bank and Gaza full Israeli citizenship. He is also a strong supporter of minority rights, particularly for Arab Israelis. He supports the one-state solution to the Israeli–Palestinian conflict.

== Early life ==
Reuven Rivlin was born in Jerusalem during the Mandate era to the Rivlin family, which has lived in Jerusalem since 1809. He is a descendant of students of the Vilna Gaon. His parents were Rachel "Ray" Rivlin and Yosef Yoel Rivlin. Yosef created the first Hebrew edition of the Quran and was a candidate for president of Israel in 1957 before withdrawing in favor of the incumbent Yitzhak Ben-Zvi.

Rivlin attended Gymnasia Rehavia high school, and served in the Intelligence Corps of the Israel Defense Forces. During the Six-Day War, he fought with the Jerusalem Brigade and accompanied the Paratroopers Brigade as an intelligence officer. After military service, he studied law at the Hebrew University of Jerusalem.

Before entering politics, Rivlin served as legal advisor of the Beitar Jerusalem Sports Association, manager of the Beitar football team, and chairman of the association; member of the Jerusalem City Council; member of the El Al Board; Chairman of the Israel Institute for Occupational Safety and Hygiene; a board member of the Khan Theater, and board member of the Israel Museum.

== Political career ==
He was first elected to the 12th Knesset in 1988, and served as Likud chairman from 1988 to 1993. He lost his seat in the 1992 elections, but returned to the Knesset following the 1996 elections. Re-elected in 1999, he was appointed Minister of Communications in March 2001, serving until February 2003, when he was elected Knesset Speaker following the 2003 elections. During his term as Speaker, he was criticized for breaking the tradition of political neutrality of the post; he was one of Ariel Sharon's harshest critics regarding the disengagement plan, and had a public confrontation with Aharon Barak, Chief Justice of the Supreme Court, concerning the court's authority to declare legislation illegal.

Rivlin was re-elected in 2006 and 2009. He ran in the 2007 election for President as the Likud candidate. He withdrew after the first round of voting when it became clear that Kadima MK Shimon Peres had sufficiently broad support to inevitably win in a run-off.

On 30 March 2009, the Knesset elected Rivlin as Speaker with a majority of 90 votes out of 120.

For his first official visit as Knesset Speaker, he chose the Arab-Israeli town of Umm al-Fahm, just south of the Galilee. He was accompanied by MKs Uri Orbach (The Jewish Home) and Afu Agbariyah (Hadash), a resident of the city.

Since 1999, Rivlin has employed Rivka Ravitz, a Haredi woman, first as his bureau chief and campaign advisor, and, upon his election to president, as his chief of staff. Ravitz is credited with managing Rivlin's successful campaigns for Knesset Speaker and President of Israel, and often accompanies him on his local appearances, as well as visits to foreign heads of state.

== President of Israel ==
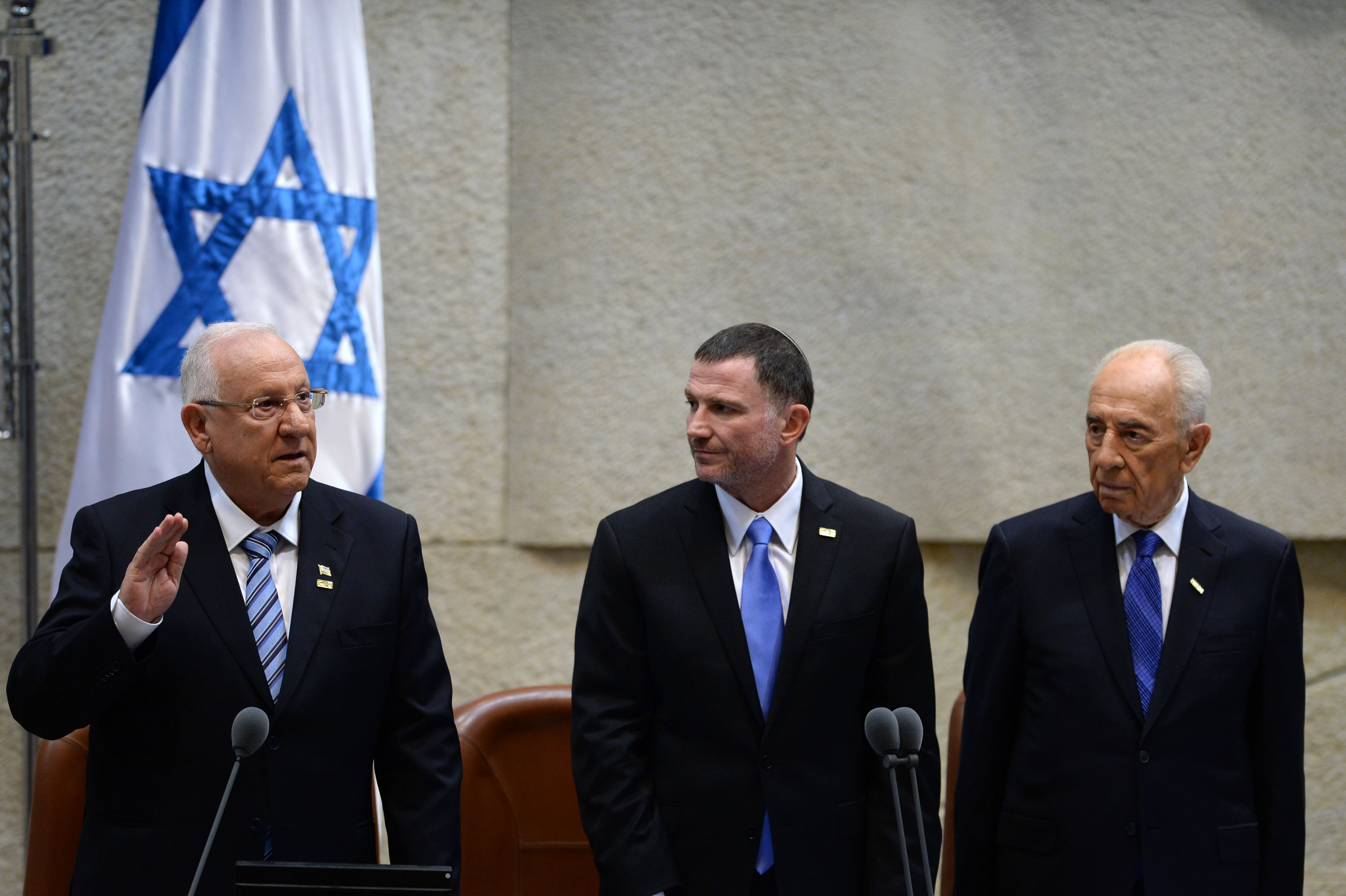
Swearing-in ceremony of President Reuven Rivlin of Israel

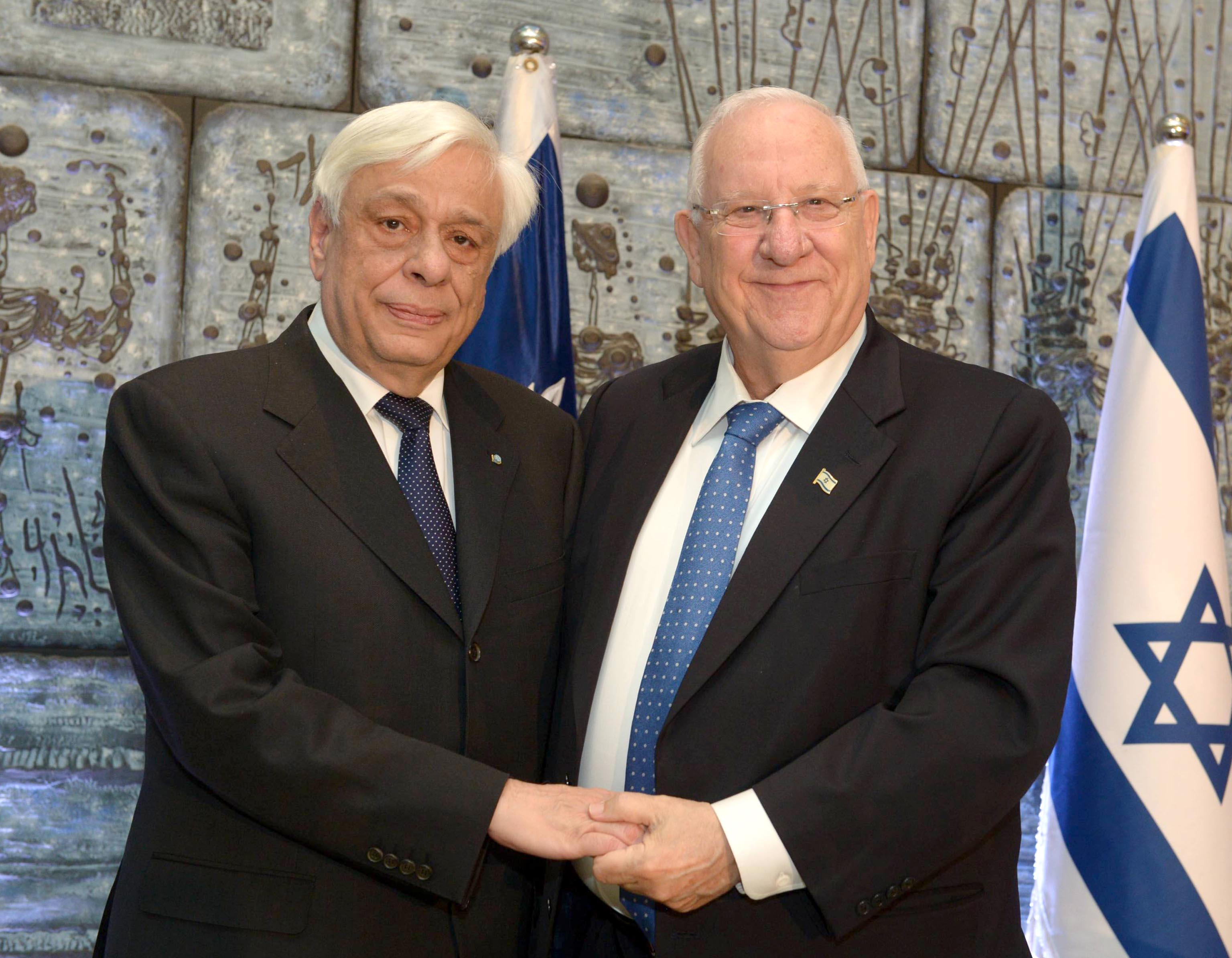
President of Greece Prokopis Pavlopoulos and President of Israel Reuven Rivlin in March 2016

Rivlin was elected as the 10th President of Israel on 10 June 2014, receiving the support of 63 MKs in a runoff vote against MK Meir Sheetrit. In his bid to become president, he won support from both Arab legislators who appreciated his courtesy, and from right-wingers like Naftali Bennett and Danny Danon, who joined him in a desire to make the West Bank a part of Israel proper.

Rivlin was sworn in on 24 July 2014, succeeding Shimon Peres. Upon his election as president, he immediately ceased being a member of the Knesset.

On 25 March 2015, Rivlin, in his role as president, officially chartered incumbent Prime Minister Benjamin Netanyahu with the assignment of forming a new government following elections the previous week. In his remarks during the ceremony, Rivlin noted that the first priority of the new government should be to mend the frayed relationship Israel's government has with the United States, and he expressed his disapproval of Netanyahu's election day exhortation that Arab voters were being bused to polling booths by NGOs and were voting "in droves". "One who is afraid of votes in a ballot box will eventually see stones thrown in the streets", said Rivlin.

Other critical issues he recommended the new government address included establishing greater stability to avoid early elections and "healing the wounds, mending the painful rifts, which have gaped open in the past years, and widened further in the course of this recent election".

In July 2015, following Rivlin's condemnation of the firebombing of a Palestinian home by suspected Jewish extremists that resulted in the death of a Palestinian toddler, Rivlin received death threats. Rivlin labelled those who committed the violence as "terrorists", lamenting that his own people had "chosen the path of terror", and that Israel was lax in confronting Jewish terrorism.

On 6 April 2019, following inconclusive elections, Rivlin gave Netanyahu, the head of the larger bloc, the first opportunity to pull together a coalition. When Netanyahu was unable to do so, the Knesset was dissolved, and a new election were called for September of the same year. The September election was inconclusive, and on 25 September 2019, Rivlin gave Netanyahu the opportunity to form a government, as he was again the head of the larger bloc. Netanyahu was again unable to form a coalition. as a result, Rivlin gave the opportunity to Benny Gantz. On 21 November 2019, Rivlin gave formal notice to Knesset Speaker Yuli Edelstein that Gantz's mandate to form a government had drawn to a close and the mandate to create a governing coalition would now lie with the Knesset, where any MK would have 21 days to garner a Knesset Majority to form a government. This was the first time in Israel's history that the Knesset had been tasked with doing so, and its subsequent failure to do so led to a third election being scheduled for March 2020.

The 2020 election was inconclusive, leading Rivlin to give Gantz the mandate a second time on 16 March 2020. Gantz was unable to form a government, but reached a deal with Netanyahu to form a unity government. with the two rotating the position of prime minister after 18 months. as a result, Rivlin gave Netanyahu the mandate on 9 May, leading to the formation of a new government. the government collapsed in December 2020 following a failed budgetary vote, leading to new elections in March 2021. The election was inconclusive, and Rivlin gave Netanyahu the mandate to form a government on 6 April 2021. Netanyahu failed to form a government, and Rivlin handed the mandate to Yair Lapid on 5 May. Lapid entered negotiations with Naftali Bennett, Mansour Abbas, and other politicians to form a new government, where Lapid and Bennett would rotate the position of prime minister. On 2 June, an hour before his mandate was set to expire, Lapid informed Rivlin that he could form a new government. That day, Isaac Herzog was elected to succeed Rivlin as president. the new government was formed and sworn in on 13 June. Rivlin's term ended on 7 July with Herzog's inauguration.

== Views and opinions ==
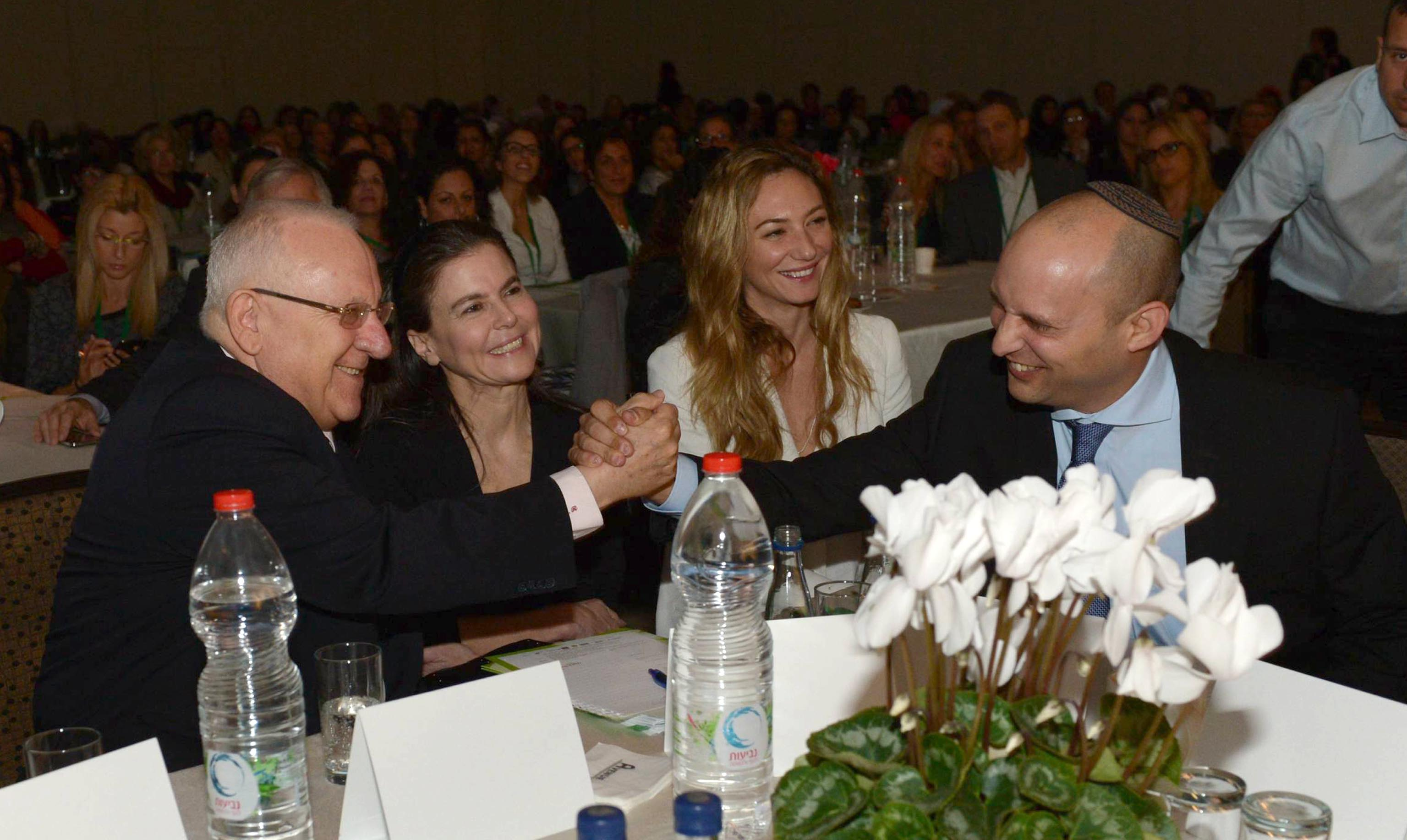
Reuven Rivlin, with Michal Ansky, Naftali Bennett and Ofra Strauss at the Jasmine businesswomen's convention for promotion of small and medium-sized enterprises, Israel, 15 December 2014

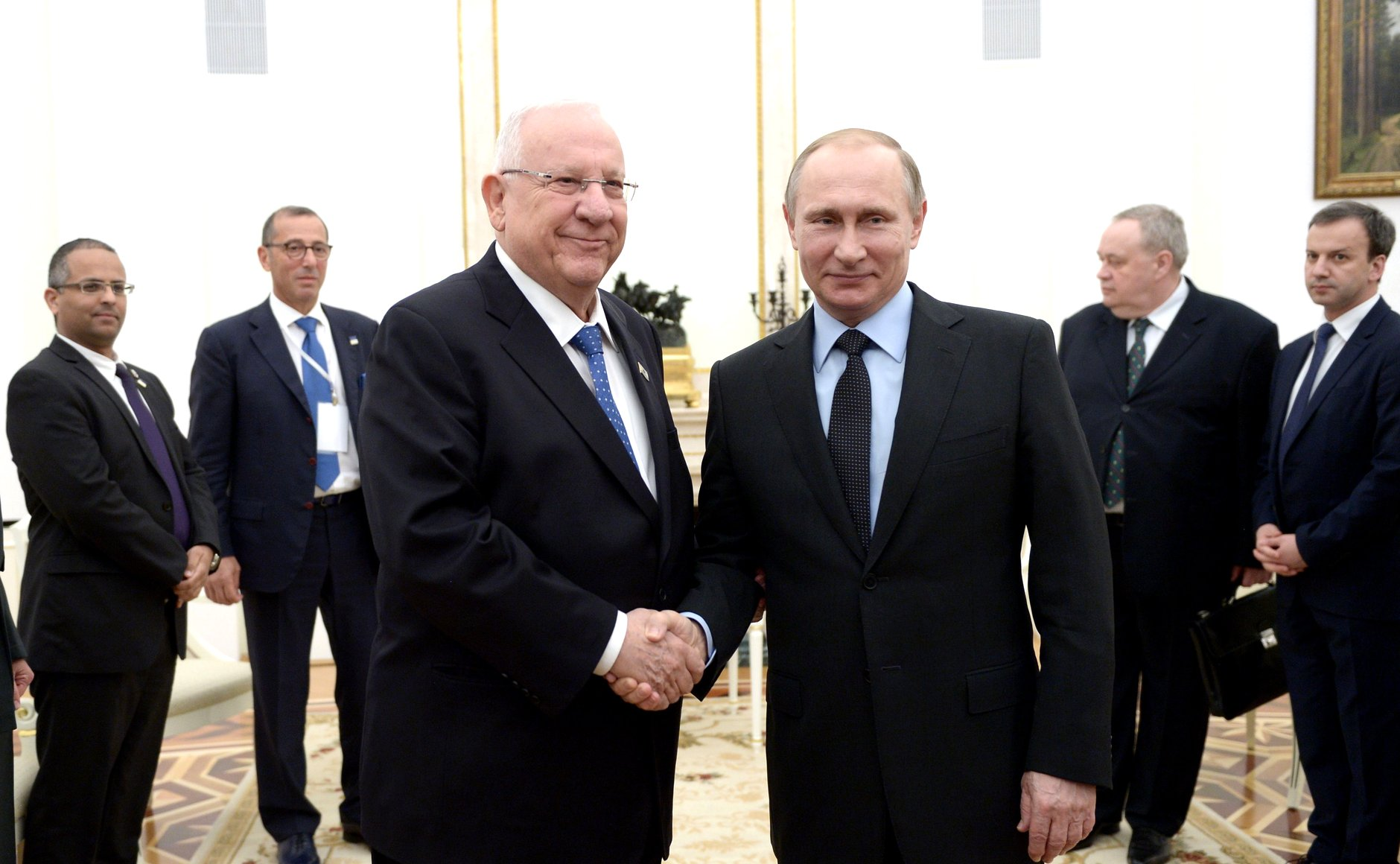
Reuven Rivlin with Vladimir Putin during his official visit to Russia in March 2016

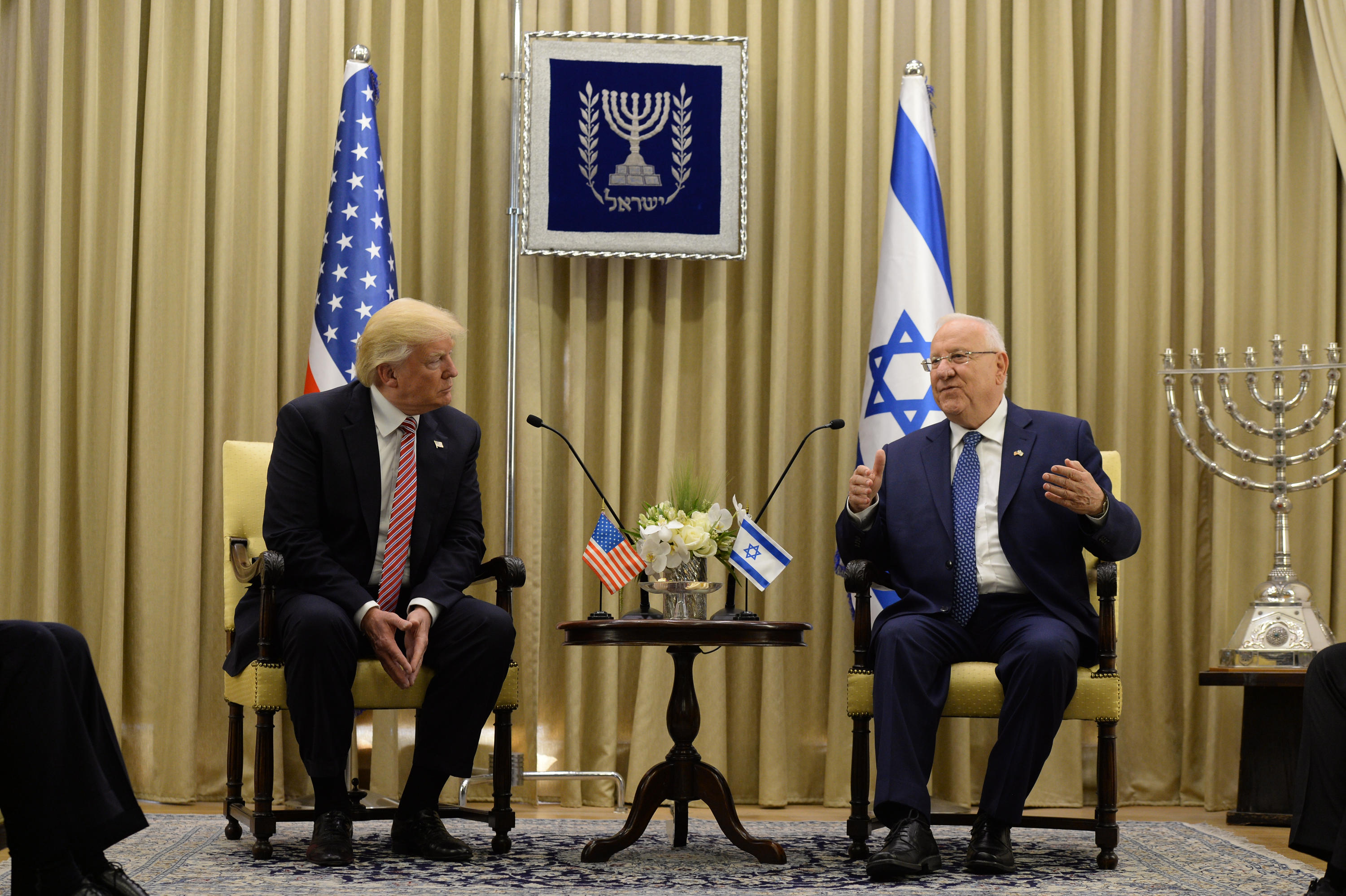
Rivlin with U.S. president Donald Trump, 22 May 2017

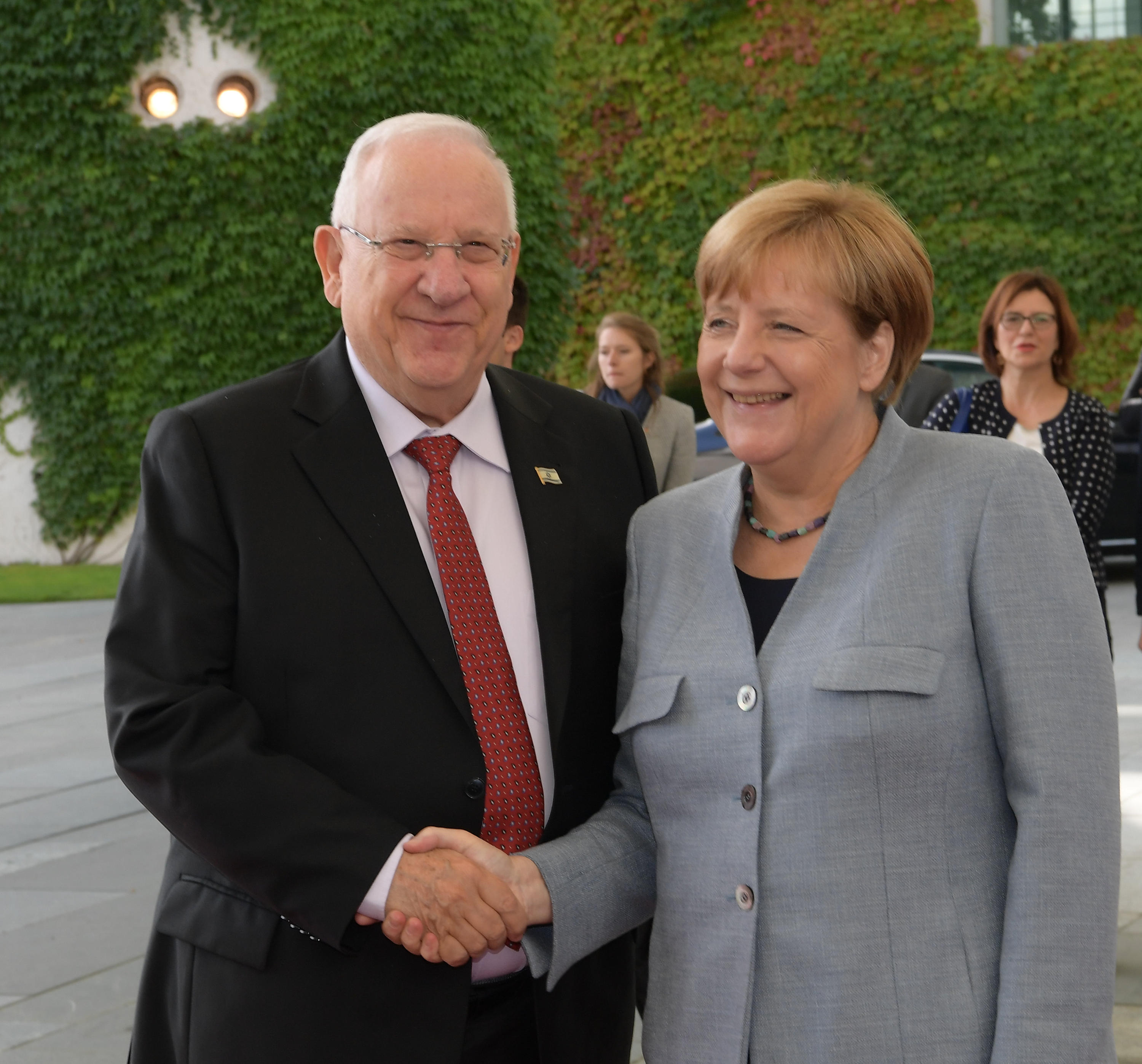
Reuven Rivlin with Angela Merkel during his official visit to Germany in September 2017

Although considered a nationalist and hawkish on the Israeli–Palestinian conflict, Rivlin is a supporter of minority rights, particularly those of the Arab-Israelis. As speaker of the Knesset, Rivlin made his first official visit to the Arab-Israeli city of Umm al-Fahm, often portrayed as a locus of anti-state and pro-Palestine sentiment and agitation.

In June 2010, Rivlin ignored calls to remove Balad MK Haneen Zoabi for joining the Gaza Freedom Flotilla. Rivlin's actions in defending the parliamentary rights of Zoabi were criticized by some, but others praised his courage in defending Israeli democracy. The same year, a group of rabbis on government payroll called on Jewish Israelis to not rent apartments to non-Jews. Rivlin protested this declaration, saying,

In my opinion, their statement shames the Jewish people. If such a thing were said in relation to Jews anywhere on the globe, a hue and cry would be raised in Israel on the need to stand up against anti-Semitism."

When asked about conditions for African refugees in Israel Rivlin stated, "As a democrat and a Jew, I have a hard time with concentration camps, where people are warehoused." In 2013, Rivlin slammed Beitar Jerusalem F.C. fans who chanted anti-Arab slogans when two Muslim players were added to the team. Rivlin told a gathering of academics: "Israeli society is sick, and it is our duty to treat this disease."

In November 2014, Rivlin cancelled a scheduled performance of Amir Benayoun after the singer released an anti-Arab song. In 2016, Rivlin forbid Balad MK Jamal Zahalka to enter the presidential residence ("Beit HaNassi"), after Zahalka and other MKs of Balad met with the families of Palestinians who were killed while attacking Israeli civilians.

In 2000, Rivlin supported legislation that would make it illegal for women to wear prayer shawls. The law was not passed, but Rivlin's position on the issue led to estrangement with his American-Israeli feminist cousin, Lilly Rivlin. In 2008, the Knesset choir sang the "Hatikva" at a welcoming ceremony without the female members of the choir. Rivlin admitted that as Knesset speaker, he was careful not to invite women to sing so as not to create a conflict with Orthodox Jews.

Rivlin has voiced support for a version of a one-state solution, and remains a staunch supporter of Jewish settlement in the West Bank. In 2010, he said that he "would rather accept Palestinians as Israeli citizens than divide Israel and the West Bank in a future two-state peace solution".

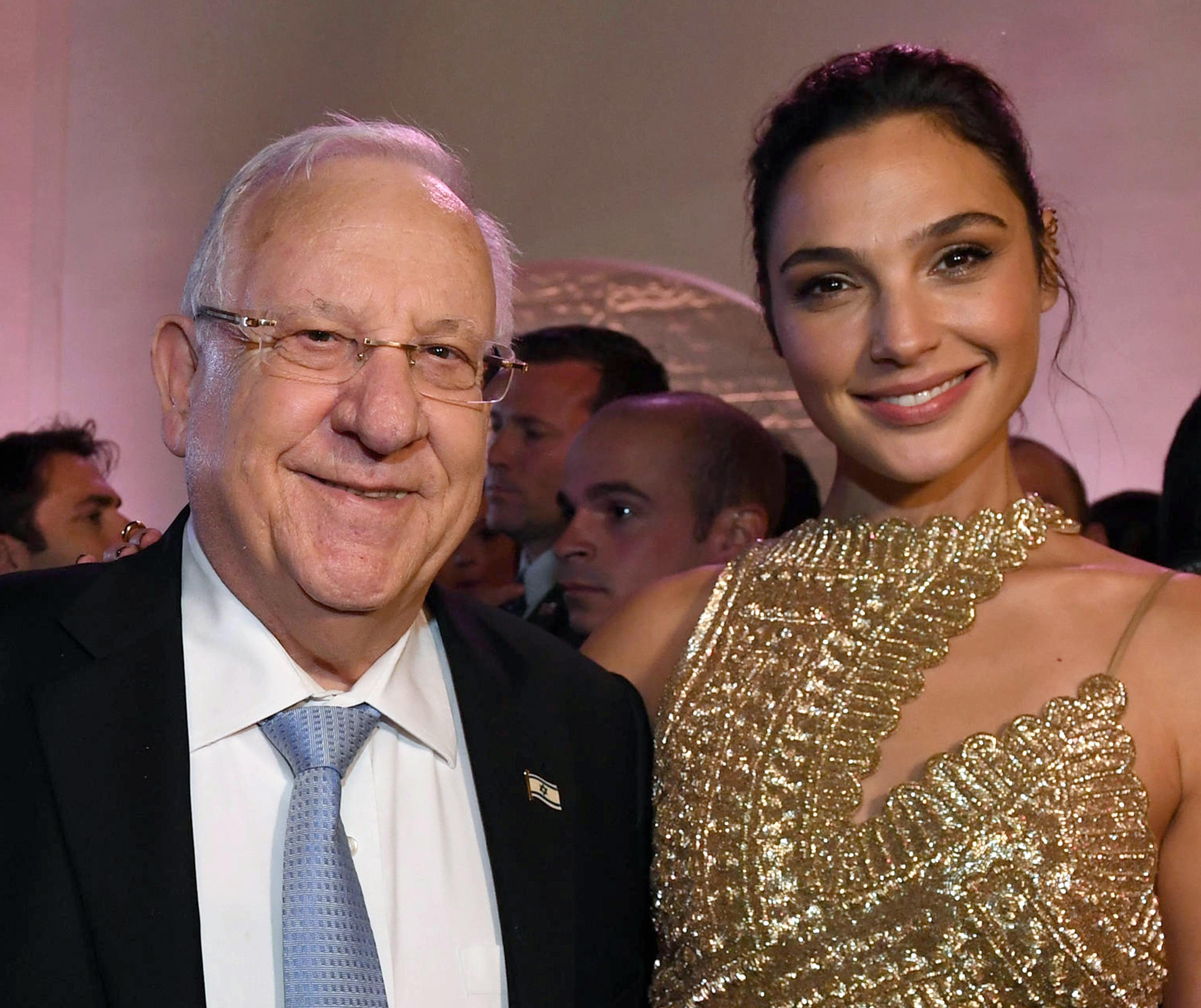
Reuven Rivlin with actress Gal Gadot, Los Angeles, November 2017

According to Rivlin, Israel's fight is not with the Palestinian people or Islam, but against terrorism. He pointed out that Palestinians could not be expected to accept a two-state solution where "one state is an invincible superpower, and the other is sub-autonomous", while declaring that, "West Bank settlements are as Israeli as Tel Aviv". He told Liberian president Ellen Johnson Sirleaf,

Israel is working and trying to bring an end to the tragedy with the Palestinians. We must respect the idea (of a Palestinian state) because they're here, and they must recognize the idea that the Jewish nation has returned to its homeland. These are difficult challenges when there is no trust between nations.

Although not Orthodox himself, Rivlin has been critical of non-Orthodox movements in Judaism. In 1989, Rivlin referred to Reform Jews as "idol worshippers", and refused to call Reform Jewish rabbis by their title. Prior to becoming president, he opposed granting equal status to Reform or Conservative Judaism. In 2014, Rivlin said that if non-Orthodox conversion standards were adopted, Jewish status would be based on "a civic definition rather than a religious definition", echoing a Knesset speech he gave in 2006 when he declared: "I have no doubt, and my positions are known, that the status of Judaism according to halachah (Jewish law) is what has kept us going for 3,800 years."

In November 2014, however, Rivlin welcomed at his residence over 50 Reform leaders on the Board of Governors of Hebrew Union College-Jewish Institute of Religion and told them, "We are one family and the connection between all Jews, all over the world, is very important to the State of Israel." In 2015, he did not allow a Conservative rabbi to officiate at a bar mitzvah service at his residence for disabled children who attended a program run by the Conservative movement, but later hosted representatives of the Reform, Conservative, and Orthodox Jewish communities for a joint study session at the President's Residence.

Rivlin once campaigned for Israel to recognize the Armenian genocide. In 2012, he said, "It is our moral duty to remember and remind of the tragedy that befell the Armenian people, who lost more than a million of its sons during the First World War, and we must not make this a political issue. I am aware of the sensitivity of this issue. But let us be clear: This is not an accusation of Turkey today or of the current Turkish government." As president, he has been less vocal on this issue. Concerned about the negative reaction of Turkey if Rivlin signed the petition, unnamed officials of the Foreign Ministry welcomed what they called his "statesmanship".

In February 2018, the Polish Prime Minister Mateusz Morawiecki stated that "there were Jewish perpetrators" of the Holocaust, "not only German perpetrators." Rivlin condemned his words: "Saying that our people collaborate with the Nazis is a new low...today, more than ever, we must work to educate the world, even some of the leaders, about that dark time."

Rivlin took part in the March of the Living in Poland on 12 April 2018. In the meeting with Polish president Andrzej Duda, he said: "There is no doubt that there were many Poles who fought the Nazi regime, but we cannot deny that Poland and Poles had a hand in the extermination."

== Personal life ==
He was married to Nechama Rivlin from 1971 until her death in 2019, and has four children. Rivlin has been a vegetarian since the late 1960s. Rivlin has been a supporter of the Beitar Jerusalem football club since the age of seven, when he attended his first game. He is fluent in Arabic.

== Controversy ==
According to the Jerusalem Post Rivlin gave a speech in 2017 that criticized Prime Minister Benjamin Netanyahu's government, saying he had witnessed a "continued effort to weaken the gatekeepers of Israeli democracy" and speaking also about the role of the judiciary in Israeli democracy:

There is an abyss between the responsible and courageous attempt to define, after years, the relations between the legislative and judicial branches, to draw borders for judicial criticism, ask questions about appointments, aim for a more varied and representative group of judges – and the attempt to terrorize the [Supreme] Court, weaken it as an institution and invite the public to undermine its authority and rulings.

A few days after the speech graffiti in Bnei Brak appeared calling Rivlin a "Nazi apostate from Judaism". Police were called to investigate the incident.

Political offices
Preceded by Avraham Burg	Speaker of the Knesset; 2003–2006	Succeeded by Dalia Itzik
Preceded by Dalia Itzik	Speaker of the Knesset; 2009–2013	Succeeded by Yuli-Yoel Edelstein
Preceded by Shimon Peres	President of Israel; 2014–2021	Succeeded by Isaac Herzog
