= Rivkind =

Rivkind is a Jewish surname, similar to Rivkin. Notable people with the surname include:

- Avraham Rivkind, Israeli physician and surgeon
- Isaac Rivkind (1895–1968), Polish Jewish American librarian and Zionist activist
- Leonid Rivkind, Russian and Israeli male curler

== See also ==
- Rifkind
