= Edgardo Ramos =

American judge (born 1960)

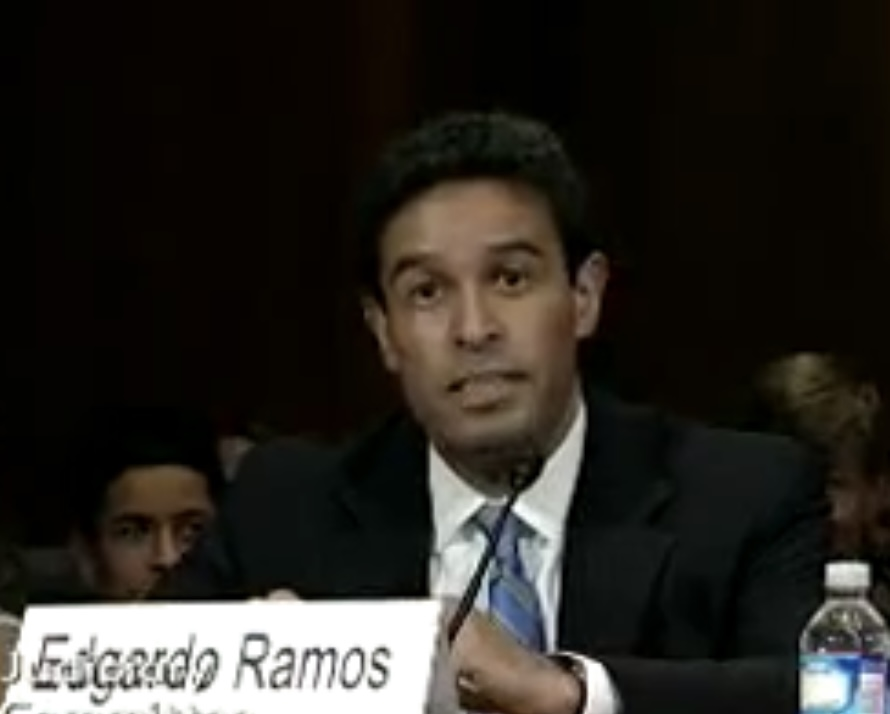

Judge of the United States District Court for the Southern District of New York
- Incumbent
- Assumed office December 6, 2011
- Appointed by: Barack Obama
- Preceded by: Stephen C. Robinson

Personal details
- Born: 1960 (age 65–66) Ponce, Puerto Rico
- Education: Yale University (BA); Harvard Law School (JD)

Edgardo Ramos (born 1960) is a United States district judge of the United States District Court for the Southern District of New York.

== Early life and education ==
Born in Ponce, Puerto Rico, Ramos moved as a child with his mother and six siblings to Newark, New Jersey. He earned a Bachelors of Arts in 1982 from Yale University and a Juris Doctor in 1987 from Harvard Law School.

== Career ==
From 1987 until 1992, Ramos worked in private legal practice as an associate with Simpson Thacher & Bartlett. From 1992 until 2002, he was an assistant United States attorney in the Eastern District of New York, where he prosecuted cases involving "white-collar fraud, narcotics trafficking, labor racketeering, public corruption, and money laundering." He also served as deputy chief of the Narcotics section. From 2002 until his appointment as a district court judge, Ramos was a partner with the law firm Day Pitney LLP. He also served as a commissioner on the New York City Commission to combat police corruption.

=== Federal judicial service ===
On May 4, 2011, President Barack Obama nominated Ramos to a seat on the United States District Court for the Southern District of New York that had been vacated by Judge Stephen C. Robinson, who resigned in 2010. On September 15, 2011, the Senate Judiciary Committee reported his nomination to the Senate floor by a voice vote. The Senate confirmed his nomination on December 5, 2011, by a 89–0 vote. He received his commission on December 6, 2011.

=== Notable rulings ===
- On December 3, 2018, Ramos ruled that the Trump administration did not have the authority to withhold public safety grants from sanctuary jurisdictions that refuse to cooperate in immigration enforcement and that the conditions unlawfully violate the separation of powers and were arbitrary and capricious in violation of the Administrative Procedure Act. On February 26, 2020, a panel of the United States Court of Appeals for the Second Circuit unanimously overturned the decision stating, in part, that the conditions defined in the policy "help the federal government enforce national immigration laws and policies supported by successive Democratic and Republican administrations."
- On May 22, 2019, Ramos affirmed the validity of subpoenas issued to Deutsche Bank and Capital One by two committees of the U.S. House of Representatives. The subpoenas asked for financial records relating to President Donald Trump, his adult children, and his businesses. Trump's lawyers had asked Ramos to quash the subpoenas, but Ramos said such a request was "unlikely to succeed on the merits." On May 28, Ramos granted Trump's attorneys their request for a stay so they could pursue an expedited appeal through the courts.

=== Controversies ===
Ramos came under ethical scrutiny for allegedly violating the Judicial Code of Conduct by failing to disclose financial conflicts of interests in matters he presided over. In September 2021, the Wall Street Journal published an article reporting that more than 131 federal judges had violated their ethical obligations by presiding over matters where they had a financial interest. Ramos was prominently highlighted in the Wall Street Journal piece for presiding over a lawsuit between ExxonMobil and TIG Insurance Co. over a pollution dispute, while he owned upwards of $50,000 of ExxonMobil stock. Ramos ruled in favor of ExxonMobil, ordering TIG Insurance Co. to pay ExxonMobil $28 million in damages as well as $8 million in interest.

Ramos again came under controversy in March 2022, when he failed to disclose a financial interest in a case he was presiding over. Investors had sued major banks, including Barclays and HSBC, accusing them of rigging the foreign bond market. Ramos dismissed the investors' complaint. It was later revealed that he held stock in one of the defendant banks. He subsequently recused himself from the matter, which was taken over by Judge Valerie E. Caproni; she reconsidered the dismissal of the investors' complaint against the banks and allowed the case to proceed.

== See also ==
- List of Hispanic and Latino American jurists

Legal offices
Preceded by Stephen C. Robinson	Judge of the United States District Court for the Southern District of New York; 2011–present	Incumbent
