= Simon H. Rifkind =

American judge (1901–1995)

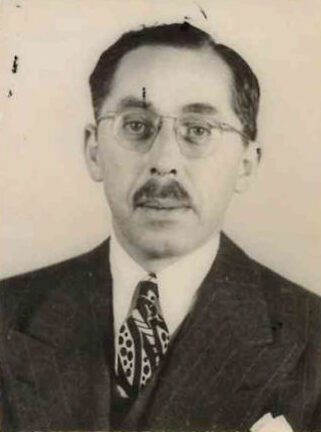
- Rifkind in 1945

Judge of the United States District Court for the Southern District of New York
- In office June 6, 1941 – May 24, 1950
- Appointed by: Franklin D. Roosevelt
- Preceded by: Robert P. Patterson
- Succeeded by: Edward Weinfeld

Personal details
- Born: Simon Hirsch Rifkind; June 5, 1901 Meretz, Russian Empire
- Died: November 14, 1995 (aged 94) New York City, New York
- Children: Richard Rifkind, Robert S. Rifkind
- Education: City College of New York (BS); Columbia University (LLB)

Simon Hirsch Rifkind (June 5, 1901 – November 14, 1995) was a United States district judge of the United States District Court for the Southern District of New York and trial lawyer.

== Education and career ==
Born on June 5, 1901, in Meretz, Russian Empire (now Merkinė, Lithuania), Rifkind emigrated with his family to the Lower East Side of New York City in 1910. He received a Bachelor of Science degree in 1922 from the City College of New York, graduating Phi Beta Kappa, and a Bachelor of Laws in 1925 from Columbia Law School. He entered private practice in New York City from 1926 to 1930. He was an administrative assistant to United States Senator Robert F. Wagner of New York from 1927 to 1933. He returned to private practice in New York City from 1933 to 1941.

== Federal judicial service ==
Rifkind was nominated by President Franklin D. Roosevelt on April 25, 1941, to a seat on the United States District Court for the Southern District of New York vacated by Judge Robert P. Patterson He was confirmed by the United States Senate on June 3, 1941, and received his commission on June 6, 1941. His service terminated on May 24, 1950, due to his resignation.

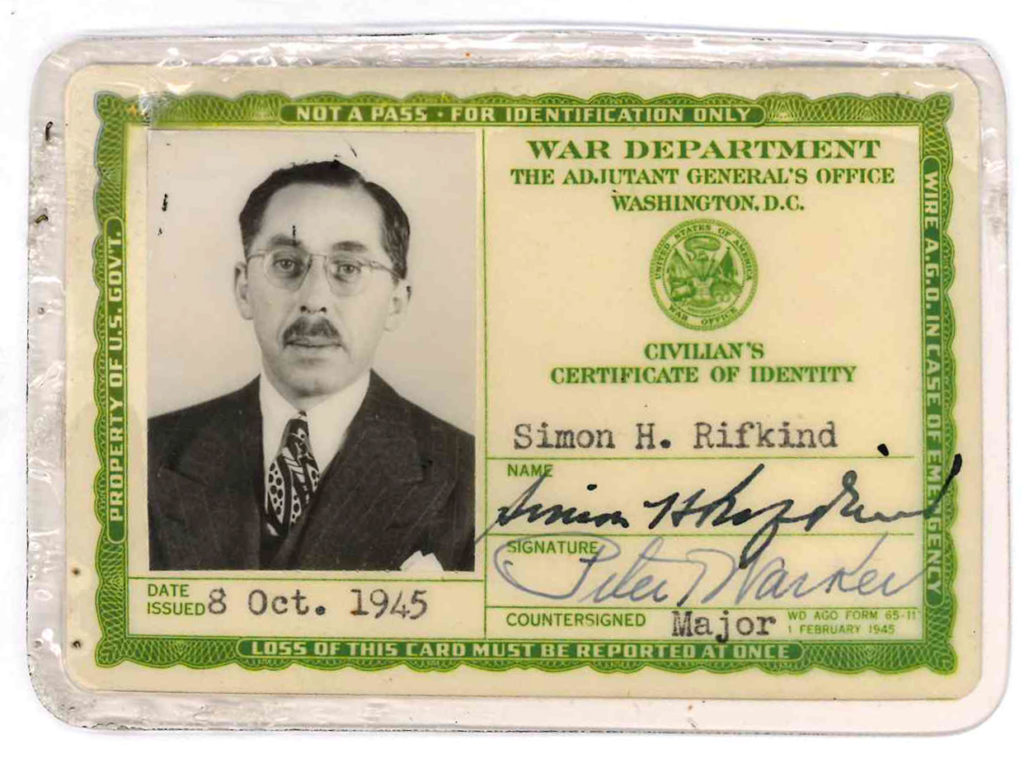
Rifkind's War Department ID, issued October 8, 1945

In 1945 and 1946, Rifkind served as a temporary special advisor to General Dwight Eisenhower, advising him on Jewish affairs in the European theater of World War II. In 1946, he spoke before the Anglo-American Commission of Inquiry on Palestine, in favor of the resettlement of Jewish refugees in Mandatory Palestine. In 1947, he began to serve as the vice president the Jewish Theological Seminary's board of directors. He also served as chairman of the United Jewish Appeal's "committee of five" and as a chairman for the American Jewish Committee.

== Post judicial service ==
After his resignation from the federal bench, Rifkind returned to private practice in New York City from 1950, with the law firm of Paul, Weiss, Rifkind, Wharton & Garrison, where he continued to serve as a senior partner until his death. He died on November 14, 1995, at Lenox Hill Hospital in Manhattan, New York City. He resided on the Upper East Side of Manhattan at the time of his death.

== See also ==
- List of Jewish American jurists

== Sources ==
- Brooks, John (May 23, 1983). "Advocate". The New Yorker.

Legal offices
Preceded by Robert P. Patterson	Judge of the United States District Court for the Southern District of New York; 1941–1950	Succeeded by Edward Weinfeld
