= Carole Rifkind =

American writer (1935–2019)

- Born: Carole Lewis; June 23, 1935; Brooklyn, New York
- Died: July 22, 2019 (aged 84); New York City
- Occupations: teacher, architecture critic, filmmaker
- Relatives: Richard Rifkind (husband)

Carole Rifkind (June 23, 1935 – July 22, 2019) was an American architecture critic, architectural historian, author, educator and filmmaker. Her books concern architectural history as well as the negotiation between the built environment and people within the urban landscape.

== Biography ==
Carole Lewis was born in Brooklyn, New York. She studied at Mount Holyoke College and Barnard College, graduating from the latter in 1956. The same year she married Richard Rifkind.

She taught at Columbia Graduate School of Architecture, Planning and Preservation and directed programs for the Hudson River Museum, the Municipal Art Society and Partners for Livable Places. She was also a consultant on historic preservation and tourism planning.

In 2011, she and her husband set up a Faculty Support Fund at Barnard, to assist teachers in the early years of their career.

== Publications ==
=== Books ===
- (with Carol Levine) Mansions, Mills, and Main Streets. New York: Schocken Books, 1975. ISBN 0805235841
- Main Street: the Face of Urban America. New York: Harper & Row, 1977. ISBN 9780060135737
- A Field Guide to American Architecture. New York: New American Library, 1980. ISBN 9780452252240
- Tourism and Communities: Process, Problems, and Solutions. Washington, D.C.: Partners for Livable Places, 1981.
- A Field Guide to Contemporary American Architecture. New York: Dutton, 1998. ISBN 9780517460054

=== Articles ===
- "America's Fantasy Urbanism: The Waxing of the Mall and the Waning of Civility," in: Dumbing Down: Essays on the Strip Mining of American Culture edited by Katharine Washburn and John F. Thornton. New York: W.W. Norton, 1996. ISBN 9780393038293
- "Are We Getting What We Deserve?" (with ...), Oculus 61 no. 4 (Dec. 1998), p. 8–9.
- "Building Character," Metropolitan Home vol. 27, no. 5 (Sept.-Oct. 1995) p. 132–137. (Renovation of the author's eastern Long Island home)
- "Cultural Tourism: a New Opportunity for the Industrial City," Environmental Comment (Jan. 1981), p. 4–7.
- "Examining the 'First American City': SAH tours Pittsburgh," Society of Architectural Historians Newsletter vol. 38, no. 1 (Feb. 1994), p. 1, 3–4, 15.
- "Faking It," Metropolis vol. 17, no. 5 (Dec. 1997-Jan. 1998), p. 66–67, 83, 85. (Review of Ada Louise Huxtable's Unreal America (1997)
- "How to Read an Old House," Historic preservation vol. 40, no. 1 (Jan.-Feb. 1998), p. 44–47.
- "Plying the Waters," Metropolis vol. 9, no. 3 (Oct. 1989), p. 90–95. (Concerning the revival of ferry service in New York City)
- [Untitled article concerning the Milan Metro], New York Times (May 23, 1982), p. 482.

== Filmography ==
- The Venetian Dilemma (2004)
- Naturally Obsessed: the Making of a Scientist (2009) ISBN 9781608832187
