= New York Structural Biology Center =

US scientific laboratory

- Established: 2002; 24 years ago
- Field of research: Structural Biology
- Director: Jeffrey Kieft
- Staff: 50
- Location: 89 Convent Avenue, New York City, New York, 10027, United States; 40°48′59″N 73°57′07″W
- Website: nysbc.org

The New York Structural Biology Center (NYSBC) is a facility in New York City that houses both regional and national equipment and specialists for structural biology, including Cryogenic electron microscopy, Nuclear Magnetic Resonance Spectroscopy, X-ray crystallography, and Protein production.

== History ==
NYSBC was formed in 1999, and opened in 2002, as a centralized facility for structural biology by the consortium of Rockefeller University, Columbia University, Memorial Sloan Kettering Cancer Center, City University of New York, Icahn School of Medicine at Mount Sinai, Albert Einstein College of Medicine, New York University, New York State Department of Health, and Weill Cornell Medical College. The facility is located in Harlem, on the former grounds of the City University of New York's South Campus.

An expansion of the Cryo-EM resources was funded in 2014 by the Simons Foundation. This was followed by funding from the National Institutes of Health in 2018 to establish the National Center for CryoEM Access and Training (NCCAT) and in 2022 for a National Center for In-situ Tomographic Ultramicroscopy

In 2023, NYSBC and the life science company Syncell partnered for spatial proteomics using mass spectrometry.

In 2025, the NIH and National Science Foundation funded establishing a Center on Macromolecular Dynamics by NMR spectroscopy at NYSBC.

== Activities ==
NYSBC supports structural biology research using CryoEM and NMR spectroscopy, and X-ray crystallography through the National Synchrotron Light Source II at Brookhaven National Laboratory. The CryoEM resources support Single particle analysis, Cryogenic electron tomography, and Microcrystal electron diffraction.

Scientific work at NYSBC includes developing new methods for CryoEM sample characterization, data collection, and processing.

NYSBC also trains users in CryoEM, including awarding 'merit badges' for learning current best-practice techniques.

The facility also hosted the New York Consortium on Membrane Protein Structure (NYCOMPS) facilities for protein expression to support structural genomics of membrane proteins.
