= She Couldn't Say No =

She Couldn't Say No is the name of several films. The 1930 and 1940 films were based on the play She Didn't Say No! by Benjamin Kaye.

- She Couldn't Say No (1930 film), starring Winnie Lightner and Chester Morris
- She Couldn't Say No (1939 film), starring Tommy Trinder, Fred Emney and Googie Withers
- She Couldn't Say No (1940 film), featuring Roger Pryor and Eve Arden
- She Couldn't Say No (1954 film), with Robert Mitchum and Jean Simmons
