= Carole E. Handler =

American lawyer (1935–2023)

- Born: Carole Enid Handler; December 23, 1935
- Died: October 22, 2023 (aged 87)
- Education: Harvard College, University of Pennsylvania Law School, University of Pennsylvania, Massachusetts Institute of Technology
- Occupation: lawyer
- Known for: intellectual property litigation
- Notable work: Spider-Man-Marvel Comics copyright case, 1998
- Parents: Milton Handler (father); Marion Winter Kahn (mother)

Carole Enid Handler (December 23, 1935 – October 22, 2023) was an American lawyer who specialized in intellectual property litigation in the areas of trademark, copyright and antitrust laws, particularly those related to entertainment and media industry. She is commonly known as the "lawyer who saved Spider-Man."

== Legal career ==
Handler's noteworthy achievement is a case considered to be a landmark case that was won on an ironic, yet relatively simple, but critical oversight. At issue were the sale of intellectual property rights to certain Marvel Enterprises characters that Marvel's new owners thought it bought with the company. The claim was successful because, although the purchaser of those rights had a valid signed contract with the former owners of Marvel, the actual new rights were never registered with the United States Copyright Office. Handler's discovery of that fact, and her interpretation of IP law during the court proceedings, caused the rights to revert to Marvel, which was bought by Avi Arad and Ike Perlmutter.

Handler worked with studios to develop a legal licensing system for digital video. Handler argued that the idea of Creative Commons, created by Stanford University professor Larry Lessig, is an "interesting compromise" - allowing for protection for copyrightable interests of the video itself while also acknowledging that the technology being used that causes the video to be accessed online modifies the licensing arrangement.

Aside from Handler's experience in motion picture and entertainment licensing, she worked with IP issues dealing with energy, pharmaceuticals and medical devices.

Among her antitrust work, Handler represented the National Basketball Association and several of the major motion picture studios defending them against "block booking" (when studios sell its films in bundles of 'all-or-nothing' packages; meaning that theaters were required to buy some of the studio's mediocre pictures along with the more salable ones).

In 1998, Handler took on the case of Holocaust rescuer (Righteous Gentile) Irene Gut Opdyke when Opdyke tried to re-gain the rights to tell the "authorized" account of her life story, which she had previously assigned in a lawful motion picture option agreement. Handler worked with the parties to reach an agreement and the case was dismissed with prejudice. In an ironic twist, after the trial, all parties agreed that the promoter did "nothing wrong." Opdyke publicly acknowledged the promoter who she sued by thanking him in her book, “In My Hands” and agreed to give him a producer credit for the eventual "authorized" motion picture about her life story.

Handler was a partner at Kaye Scholer LLP., O'Donnell & Shaeffer LLP and Thelen Reid & Priest LLP.

== Education ==
Handler received her undergraduate degree from Harvard College and her J.D. degree from the University of Pennsylvania Law School in 1975. She then went on to achieve a master's degree in city planning from Penn, and also studied architecture at the Massachusetts Institute of Technology.

== Honors and awards ==
Handler was named one of the "Top 50 Women Litigators in California" by Daily Journal Extra in 2005, 2004, 2003 and 2002. In 2001, and was named one of the "Lawyers of the Year" by California Lawyer.

== Personal life ==
She was the daughter of Milton Handler, who was a professor at Columbia Law School, and Marion Winter Kahn.
