= COVID-19 pandemic in New York (state) =

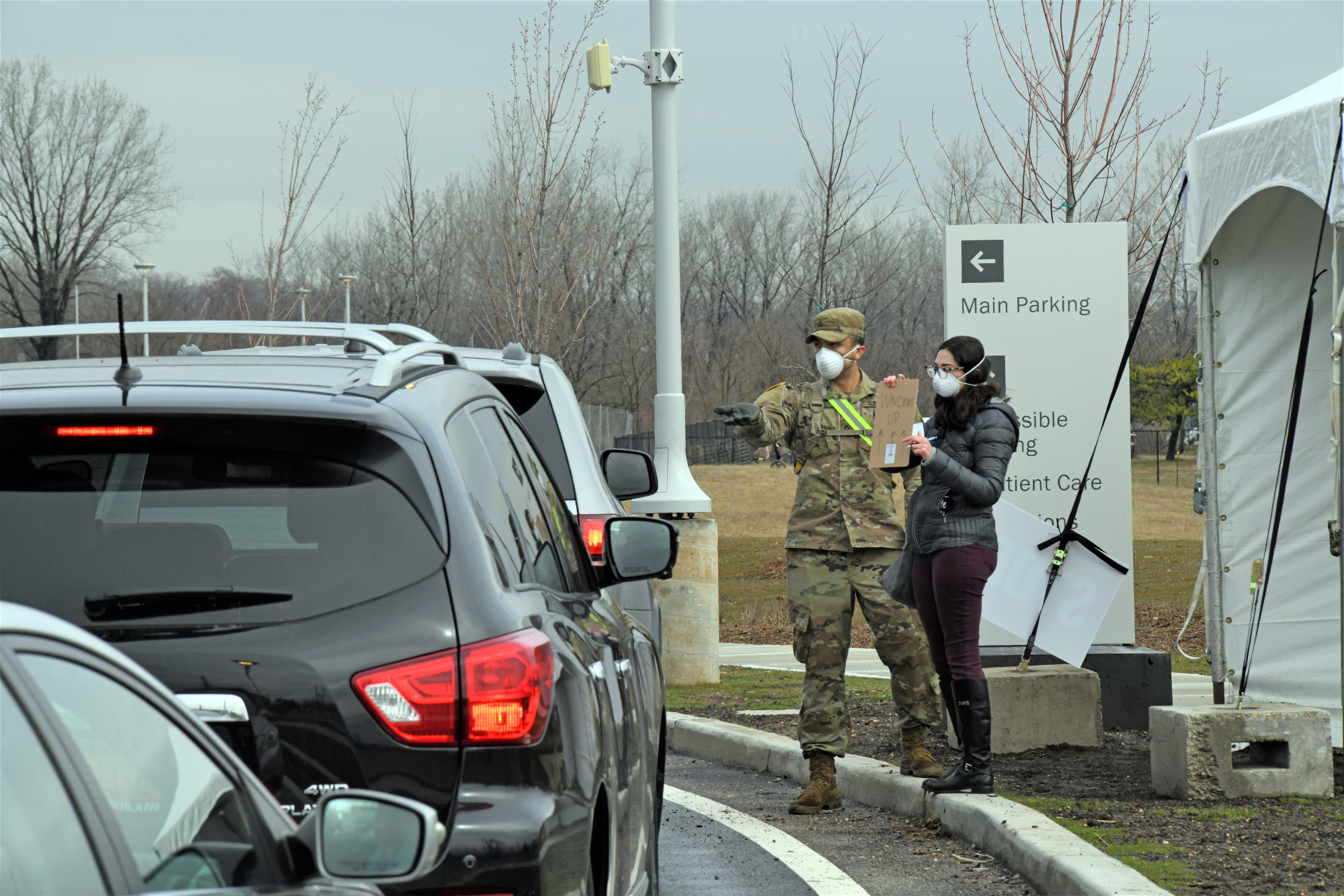
- A testing center in Staten Island in March 2020.
- Disease: COVID-19
- Pathogen: SARS-CoV-2
- Location: New York state, U.S.
- First outbreak: Wuhan, Hubei, China
- Index case: Manhattan, New York City
- Arrival date: mid-February 2020 (1st positive March 1)
- Confirmed cases: 6,390,225
- Hospitalized cases: 100,000+ (total); 9,000 (current)
- Recovered: 1,000,000+
- Deaths: 52,906 (NYSDOH); 39,834 (JHU)

Government website
- coronavirus.health.ny.gov

The first case of COVID-19 in the U.S. state of New York during the pandemic was confirmed on March 1, 2020, and the state quickly became an epicenter of the pandemic, with a record 12,274 new cases reported on April 4 and approximately 29,000 more deaths reported for the month of April than the same month in 2019. By April 10, New York had more confirmed cases than any country outside the US. As of August 11, 2023, the state has reported 131.3 million tests, with 6,722,301 cumulative cases, and 79,960 deaths.

New York had the highest number of confirmed cases of any state from the start of U.S. outbreak until July 22, 2020, when it was first surpassed by California and later by Florida and Texas. Approximately half of the state's reported cases have been in New York City, where around 40% of the state's population lives.

Despite the high number of reported cases in March and April, by May 7, New York had reduced the rate of increase of new cases to less than 1% per day, and since June 6 to less than 0.25% per day. Unlike many other states, New York did not see a spike or "second wave" in the daily new case rate during the summer months. On June 17, Governor Andrew Cuomo announced that New York had the lowest infection rate in the United States. In late September, New York began to see an uptick in cases, with over 1,000 new cases reported in a single day for the first time since early June on September 26.

As of February 17, 2021, the state of New York had the fourth highest number of confirmed cases in the United States, and the 34th highest number of confirmed cases per capita. As of November 26, 2021, it has the fourth-highest count of deaths related to the virus, surpassed by California, Florida, and Texas; and seventh-highest count per capita, behind New Jersey and several Southern and Western states, such as Mississippi, Alabama, Arizona, Louisiana and Oklahoma. In February 2021, the New York COVID-19 nursing home scandal surfaced, which drew huge criticism on Governor Cuomo's decision on withholding reports of nursing home deaths.

Government response to the pandemic in New York began with a full lockdown from March 2020 to April 2020, followed by a four-phase reopening plan by region from April 2020 to July 2020. Additional modifications to the plan were imposed in July as the state learned more about the pandemic and due to political pressure. In October 2020, a micro-cluster strategy was announced which shuts down areas of the state to varying degrees by ZIP code when cases increase.

As of September 8, 2022, New York has administered 41,044,869 COVID-19 vaccine doses, and has fully vaccinated 15,265,493 people, equivalent to 78% of the population.

== Origins ==
Genetic analysis confirmed that most cases of the virus had mutations indicating a European origin, meaning travelers flying to New York City from Europe brought the virus. Americans visiting Italy in late February and returning to New York on March 1 were not asked by customs if they had spent time in Italy, even though the State Department had urged Americans not to travel to Italy on February 29 (the same day Italy reported 1,100 COVID cases). According to statistical models, New York City already had 600 COVID-19 cases in mid-February, and as many as 10,000 cases by March 1.

== Timeline ==
March 1, 2020, saw the first confirmed case of COVID-19 in New York State, a 39-year-old female health care worker who lived in Manhattan, who had returned from Iran on February 25 with no symptoms at the time. She went into home isolation with her husband.

On March 3, a second case was confirmed, a lawyer in his 50s who lived in New Rochelle, Westchester County, immediately north of New York City, and worked in Midtown Manhattan at a law firm within One Grand Central Place. He had traveled to Miami in February, but had not visited areas known to have widespread transmission of the coronavirus. Two of his four children had recently returned from Israel. After first feeling ill on February 22, he was admitted to a hospital in Westchester on February 27, diagnosed with pneumonia, and released from isolation after testing negative for the flu. Instances of panic buying in New York were reported after his case was confirmed.

On March 4, the number of cases in New York State increased to 11 as nine people linked to the lawyer tested positive, including his wife, a son, a daughter, a neighbor, and a friend and his family.

On March 5, New York City mayor Bill de Blasio said that coronavirus fears should not keep New Yorkers off the subway, riding from Fulton Street to High Street in a public press attempt to demonstrate the subway's safety.

On March 6, eleven new cases were reported, bringing the state caseload to 33. All the new cases were tied to the first community transmission case, the lawyer. At the end of the day, an additional 11 new cases were reported by the governor, bringing the total caseload to 44, with 8 of the new cases in Westchester County, and 3 in Nassau County on Long Island. Also on March 6, an article appeared in the New York Post stating that while Mayor de Blasio assigned responsibility for the lack of N95 masks and other personal protective equipment to the federal government, the city never ordered the supplies until that date.

On March 7, Governor Andrew Cuomo declared a state of emergency in New York after 89 cases had been confirmed in the state, 70 of them in Westchester County, 12 in New York City and 7 elsewhere.

On March 8, the state reported 16 new confirmed cases and a total of 106 cases statewide. New York City issued new commuter guidelines amid the current outbreak, asking sick individuals to stay off public transit, encouraging citizens to avoid densely packed buses, subways, or trains.

Location of the New Rochelle Containment Area within Westchester County

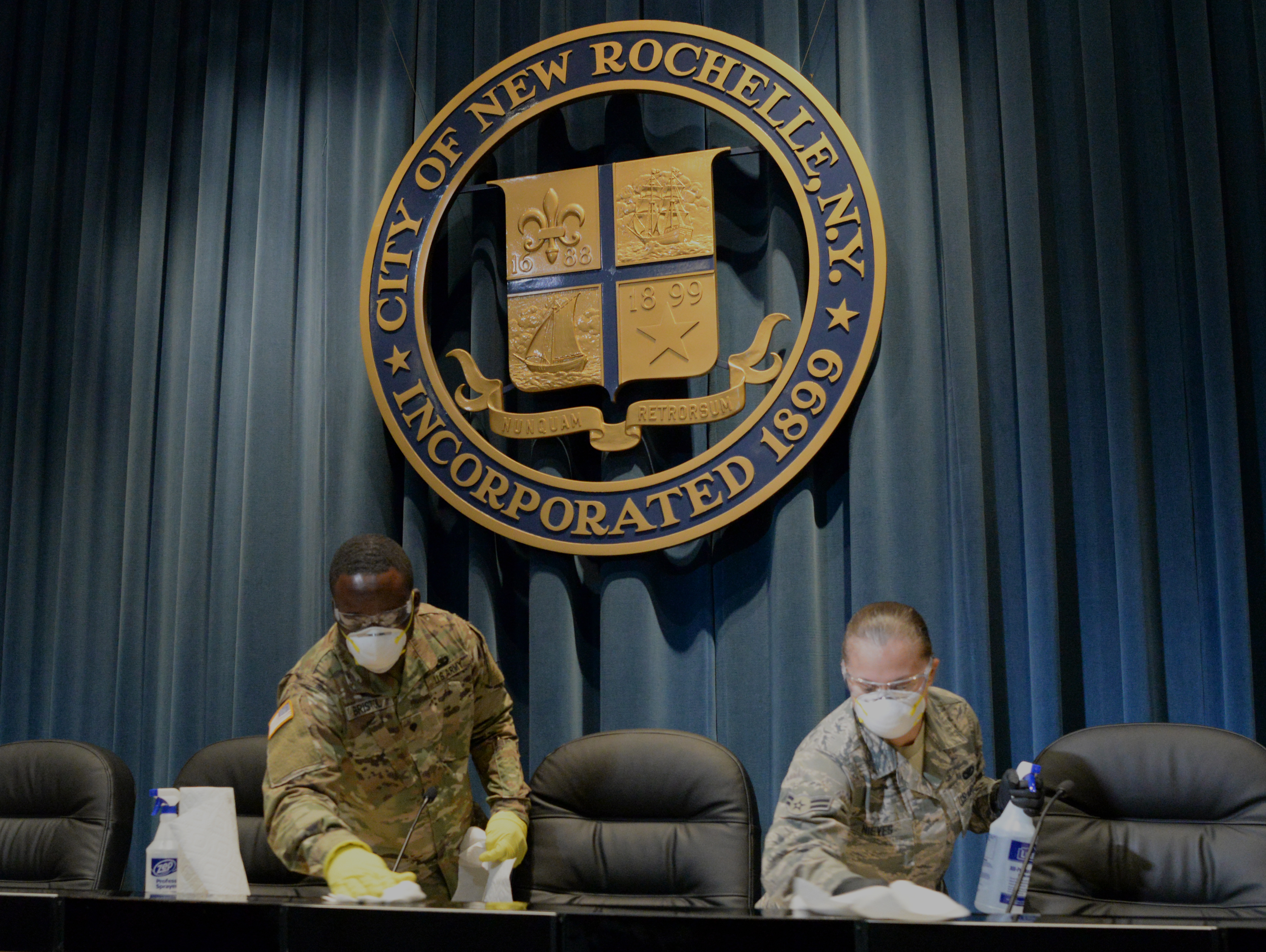
National Guard personnel disinfect the dais of New Rochelle City Hall.

On March 9, Mayor de Blasio announced that there were 16 confirmed cases of COVID-19 in New York City. On March 10, Governor Cuomo announced a containment zone in the city of New Rochelle from March 12 to 25.

On March 11, Cuomo announced that the City University of New York and State University of New York schools would be closed for the following week, from March 12 to 19. These college systems would move most classes to an online-based system starting March 19, and continuing through the rest of the spring semester. Dormitories remained open for students "who cannot return home for hardship reasons". Also on March 11, a man in Monroe County tested positive, making it the first county in Western New York to have a COVID-19 case. Officials said he flew into JFK from Italy, traveled on a Greyhound bus from Manhattan to Rochester, and arrived locally the morning of March 10. The bus continued on to Buffalo and Toronto.

On March 12, the first two cases were confirmed in Albany County, leading Albany mayor Kathy Sheehan to suspend the annual St. Patrick's Day parade. The same day, a staff member at Union College tested positive for coronavirus in Schenectady County, marking the county's first case.

On March 13, Herkimer County saw its first confirmed case but declined to disclose the patient's location. The patient later was revealed to have been from the Mohawk/Ilion area, just south of Herkimer, the county seat.

On March 14, the first two fatalities in the state occurred. An 82-year-old woman in Brooklyn with pre-existing emphysema died in the hospital. A 65-year-old person with other significant health problems who had not previously been tested for COVID-19 died at their home in Suffern, Rockland County. It was also announced that three people in Erie County tested positive for COVID-19. Orange County, Dutchess County and Ulster County closed down all their schools.

On March 15, the third fatality in the state was announced. A 79-year-old woman with underlying health issues died, who had been admitted to a New York City hospital.

On March 16, Clinton County reported its first case, at CVPH Medical Center in Plattsburgh. No further information has been revealed about the patient. Confirmed cases increased by 4,000 between March 22 and 23, which brought the total number of confirmed cases statewide to nearly 21,000. 12,305 of these were in New York City.

On March 24, Cuomo said, "The apex is higher than we thought and the apex is sooner than we thought." He warned there was not enough assistance from the federal government and that the state had 25,000 cases and at least 210 deaths. 211 NYPD officers and civilian employees have tested positive for COVID-19. In total, 2,774 NYPD employees, 7.6 percent of the workforce, were sick. There were approximately 4,000 positive cases in Westchester County by March 24, and more than 15,000 confirmed cases by April 9.

On March 26, 2020, Cuomo announced that the state would allow two patients to share one ventilator using a technique he called "splitting," where a second set of tubes would be added to the ventilator. COVID-19 patients need ventilators for between 11 and 21 days, while under normal circumstances patients usually only require them for three to four days. He also said the state was considering converting anesthesia machines to use as ventilators. Between March 25 and March 26, there were 100 deaths statewide, with the number of hospitalized patients increasing by 40 percent in New York City.

Researchers at Cornell University created an interactive map to visualize the spread of COVID-19 in New York State.

On January 4, 2021, a confirmed case of a new, more contagious SARS-CoV-2 variant from the United Kingdom was reported in New York. The patient was a man in his sixties from Saratoga County in upstate New York, who had no travel history to the United Kingdom. As of March 2, 2021, 286 sequences in the B.1.1.7 lineage have been detected in New York.

On July 22, 2021, 31 out of 550 campers at sleep-away Camp Pontiac in upstate New York tested positive. All were under the age of 12, making them too young to receive a COVID-19 vaccine in the United States.

== Impact on health care ==
=== Shortage of protective gear and medical equipment ===
After trying to purchase 200,000 N95 masks on February 7, 2020, the Office of Emergency Management learned that vendors were out of stock. Emergency provisions of masks and hand sanitizers did not arrive until early March. One medical supply vendor with standing city contracts said that the initial requests for protective gear from the Department of Citywide Administrative Services (DCAS) were bogged down by inefficient bureaucratic delays. One vendor said, "We'd send them a list of products we can deliver within 24, 48 hours," but on average it took 72 hours for the agency to place an order. He added "the city just moves so slow" when there was very high demand coming from hospitals and the private sector. According to the contractor, eight out of 10 supply orders could not be filled because DCAS did not pay on time, which a spokeswoman for New York City denied. The office of the comptroller approved 12 contracts with a total value of $150 million before the mayor's office took over the process on March 16. Mayor de Blasio said that the city might run out of supplies by April if the federal government did not send 3 million N95 masks, 50 million surgical masks, 15,000 ventilators, and 45 million surgical gowns, gloves, and face shields.

One EMS worker expressed frustration at being asked to wear the less-effective surgical masks. The police union filed a complaint on March 13 due to NYPD officers not being given masks and other protective gear. A spokeswoman called the Police Benevolent Association's complaint "empty rhetoric".

New York gave a $69 million contract to a Silicon Valley engineer to provide 1,000 ventilators. The ventilators were never delivered. As of May 5, New York was seeking a refund. The engineer's name had been supplied by federal officials, and they had received it from volunteers in the office of Jared Kushner, senior advisor to President Donald Trump. According to the New York Times, it appears the engineer had not been vetted by anyone.

=== Paramedic shortages ===
On March 28, 2020, The New York Times reported that the city's 911 emergency response system was "overwhelmed" due to the large number of coronavirus patients needing transport to the hospital. Dispatchers received more than 7,000 calls on March 26, a record since the September 11 attacks. Emergency workers had to decide which cases to prioritize, and some patients were being left at home without medical care. In addition, paramedics lacked sufficient protective gear.

=== Testing ===
The private corporations responsible for testing had a limited testing capacity, and reached a bottleneck which made it increasingly difficult to conduct more tests per day. Backlogs for test results continued to increase in multiple states such as California, where it can take weeks to receive test results.

The FDA approved New York state to authorize the state's 28 public and private labs to begin manual, semi-automated and automated testing for novel coronavirus, or COVID-19. The approval allowed the state to dramatically increase testing capacity to thousands of tests per day. The approval also extended to the Roche high-volume platform for testing. New York State's Wadsworth Lab developed a new, less intrusive test for COVID-19. The new test was done through a saliva sample and a self-administered short nasal swab in the presence of a healthcare professional. Additionally, health care professionals could self-administer the test without another health care professional present.

== Government response ==
Timeline for State Government Response
Date	Action Taken
March 7, 2020	State of emergency declared.
March 9, 2020	State began producing its own brand of hand sanitizer.
March 10, 2020	Governor Cuomo orders a coronavirus "containment zone" in New Rochelle, Westchester County, NY.
March 12, 2020	All gatherings of less than 500 people ordered to cut capacity by 50%. All gatherings of more than 500 people ordered to cancel.
March 12, 2020	All SUNY campuses ordered to close within a week, and then shift to online for the remainder of the semester.
March 15, 2020	All New York City schools ordered to close until April 20.
March 16, 2020	Governor Cuomo orders the closure of Westchester, Nassau, and Suffolk County schools for at least two weeks. Cuomo coordinates with his counterparts in New Jersey and Connecticut to formulate uniform policies for shutdowns.
March 18, 2020	Governor Cuomo signs executive order, mandating schools statewide close for at least two weeks until April 1 and pivot to remote instruction. The 180-day instructional requirement is waived.
March 20, 2020	State-wide stay-at-home order declared, effective 8:00 PM March 22. All non-essential businesses ordered to close. All non-essential gatherings canceled/postponed. 90-day moratorium issued for any residential or commercial evictions.
March 25, 2020	Advisory issued ordering nursing homes to admit patients who test positive for the coronavirus. This order was revoked on May 10, 2020.
March 27, 2020	All schools statewide ordered to remain closed until April 15.
March 28, 2020	All non-essential construction sites ordered to shut down.
April 6, 2020	Statewide stay-at-home order and school closures extended to April 29.
April 9, 2020	List of businesses deemed essential expanded.
April 15, 2020	All individuals are ordered to wear face masks/coverings in public places where social distancing is not possible.
April 16, 2020	Statewide stay-at-home order and school closures extended to May 15.
May 1, 2020	All schools and universities ordered to remain closed for the remainder of the academic year.
May 7, 2020	Statewide four-phase reopening plan is first announced.
May 10, 2020	The March 25 advisory which ordered nursing homes to admit patients who test positive for the coronavirus is revoked.
May 14, 2020	Statewide state of emergency extended to June 13.
May 15, 2020	Phase 1 of reopening allowed for counties that met qualifications. Five counties met qualifications and began reopening on this date.
May 15, 2020	Drive-in theaters, landscaping/gardening businesses allowed to reopen state-wide (regardless of Phase 1 qualifications).
May 23, 2020	Gatherings of up to ten people allowed as long as social distancing is practiced.
June 8, 2020	New York City meets conditions for Phase 1, allowing the reopening of construction, manufacturing, agriculture, forestry, fishing, and select retail businesses that can offer curbside pickup.
June 15, 2020	Four-phase reopening plan is modified to allow non-essential gatherings of 25 people upon entry of Phase 3, and 50 people upon entry of Phase 4.
June 22, 2020	New York City meets conditions for Phase 2, allowing the reopening of outdoor dining at restaurants, hair salons and barber shops, offices, real estate firms, in-store retail, vehicle sales, retail rental, repair services, cleaning services, and commercial building management businesses.
July 6, 2020	New York City meets conditions for Phase 3, with the exception of indoor dining. Governor Cuomo announces casinos and movie theaters are to remain closed statewide as the state assesses the facts for a safe-reopening.
July 10, 2020	Malls allowed to open at 25% capacity for regions in Phase 4, with all patrons required to wear masks.
July 16, 2020	New restrictions on bars/restaurants only allowing alcohol to be served only to people ordering food.
August 7, 2020	Schools allowed to open in-person in the fall if certain conditions are met.
August 19, 2020	Ban on ticketed music events at bars and restaurants.
October 1, 2020	Exposure notification apps are added to notify users of potential exposure.
October 1, 2020	The previous ban on ticketed events at bars and restaurants is ruled unconstitutional.
October 6, 2020	Micro-cluster strategy is introduced, with the first micro-clusters being parts of Brooklyn and Queens.
November 12, 2020	Bars, gyms, and any other business with a liquor license must close by 10 p.m. (restaurants as well, except for curbside pickup). Household gatherings limited to ten people.
November 25, 2020	Previous restrictions on capacity through the micro-cluster strategy for places of worship is ruled unconstitutional.
December 8, 2020	Hospital bed capacity statewide is demanded to be upgraded by 25 percent.
February 10, 2021	Large capacity areas reopen at 10% capacity, effective February 24, with a negative PCR test within 72 hours or full COVID-19 vaccination status required to attend.
May 17, 2021	NY State follows CDC guidance on masks for fully vaccinated people, effective May 19.
June 13, 2021	All capacity restrictions lifted due to 70% of NYers getting at least one shot of the COVID-19 vaccine.
June 24, 2021	State of Emergency expires
August 27, 2021	Gov. Hochul and the New York State Department of Health institute a universal mask mandate for all public and private schools for students, staff, and faculty in response to the emerging Delta variant.
November 27, 2021	A new pre-emptive State of Emergency is declared over Omicron variant.
December 10, 2021	Gov. Hochul announces a mask mandate for all indoor public places unless they implement a vaccine requirement, effective December 13.
December 20, 2021	Gov. Hochul announced the Comprehensive Winter Surge Plan, which includes streamlined school testing regulations, new test sites, mask and home test distribution, and $65 million to compensate county governments for vaccination efforts and enforcing the mask-or-vaccine mandate.
December 31, 2021	Gov. Hochul announces "Winter Surge Plan 2.0", which includes a requirement for SUNY and CUNY students to be vaccinated and boosted by January 15 in order to return to campus, and an extension of the mask or vaccine mandate to February 1.
January 24, 2022	State Supreme Court Judge Thomas Rademaker rules the mask mandate for schools and public places unconstitutional under the state constitution, citing the Governor nor State Health Department had the legal parameters to implement such mandate without consent from the state Legislature.
January 25, 2022	New York Attorney General Letitia James files a motion on behalf on the State Health Department, requesting the mask mandate remain in place for schools while the courts deliberated. Later on, a State Appellate Court Judge granted a stay in the state's lawsuit over the mask mandate, thereby once again re-affirming the mask requirement in schools.
January 28, 2022	The mask-or-vaccine mandate for businesses and venues is extended to February 10. The school mask mandate remained in place indefinitely.
February 9, 2022	Gov. Hochul announces the lifting of the mask or vaccinate mandate, effective February 10. Masks were still required in schools, healthcare settings, nursing homes, correctional facilities, and public transportation.
February 28, 2022	Gov. Hochul announces the rescinding of the universal mask mandate for schools, effective March 2. Individual school districts, towns, and localities can use their discretion to determine masking protocols based on their specific needs.
April 19, 2022	Gov. Hochul keeps the mask mandate for public transportation and transit hubs in effect despite a judge lifting the federal mandate.
September 7, 2022	Gov. Hochul announces the lifting of the mask mandate on public transportation and transit hubs, effective immediately.
February 12, 2023	The New York State Department of Health allowed the mask mandate for healthcare facilities such as hospitals and nursing homes to expire, ending the final remaining statewide mask mandate in New York. Acting health commissioner James McDonald underscored that the pandemic was not yet over but was in a "transition" period, with masking requirements now left up to healthcare providers.

== Vaccination ==
On January 8, 2021, Governor Cuomo published an initial list of New Yorkers eligible to receive the COVID-19 vaccine. Groups 1A and 1B included essential workers, seniors aged 75 and above or living in nursing homes, and certain people with disabilities. On February 14, 2021, the vaccination program was expanded to include other individuals with comorbidities for COVID-19.

Starting March 10, 2021, people aged 60 and above could get vaccinated in New York State.

Starting March 23, 2021, people aged 50 and above could get vaccinated in New York State.

Starting March 30, 2021, people aged 30 and above could get vaccinated in New York State.

Starting April 6, 2021, people aged 16 and above could get vaccinated in New York State.

Starting May 13, 2021, people aged 12 and above could get vaccinated in New York State.

As of September 27, 2021, healthcare workers in New York State were required to have had at least their first dose of the vaccine.

Vaccinations in NY State Per Week (1st Vaccination) and Time Required from Start of Vaccination to Reach Herd Immunity
Week	Number Vaccinated (1st dose)	Σ % NY State Population	Weeks and Date to Herd Immunity	Notes
1/20/2021	907,870	4.7%	75 weeks - May 2022	5 weeks
1/27/2021	1,246,946	6.4%	66 weeks - March 2022	6 weeks
2/3/2021	1,432,195	7.4%	67 weeks - April 2022	7 weeks
2/10/2021	1,738,927	8.9%	63 weeks - March 2022	8 weeks
2/17/2021	2,068,561	10.6%	59 weeks - February 2022	9 weeks
2/24/2021	2,517,003	12.9%	54 weeks - January 2022	10 weeks
3/3/2021	3,125,025	16.1%	48 weeks - November 2021	11 weeks
3/10/2021	3,972,100	20.4%	41 weeks - October 2021	12 weeks
3/17/2021	4,691,257	24.1%	38 weeks - September 2021	13 weeks
3/24/2021	5,373,954	27.6%	35 weeks - August 2021	14 weeks
4/1/2021	6,192,319	31.8%	33 weeks - August 2021	15 weeks
4/7/2021	6,871,863	35.3%	32 weeks - August 2021	16 weeks
4/14/2021	7,811,084	40.2%	30 weeks - July 2021	17 weeks
4/21/2021	8,410,070	43.2%	29 weeks - July 2021	18 weeks
4/28/2021	8,994,649	46.2%	29 weeks - July 2021	19 weeks
5/5/2021	9,421,044	48.4%	29 weeks - July 2021	20 weeks
5/12/2021	9,587,129	49.3%	30 weeks - July 2021	21 weeks
5/19/2021	10,079,911	51.8%	30 weeks - July 2021	22 weeks
5/26/2021	10,486,657	53.9%	30 weeks - July 2021	23 weeks
6/2/2021	10,744,805	55.2%	30 weeks - July 2021	24 weeks
6/9/2021	10,982,582	56.5%	31 weeks - August 2021	25 weeks
6/16/2021	11,200,556	57.6%	32 weeks - August 2021	26 weeks
6/23/2021	11,369,732	58.4%	32 weeks - August 2021	27 weeks
6/30/2021	11,524,279	59.2%	33 weeks - August 2021	28 weeks
7/7/2021	11,644,869	59.9%	34 weeks - August 2021	29 weeks
7/14/2021	11,767,479	60.5%	34 weeks - August 2021	30 weeks
7/21/2021	11,890,620	61.1%	35 weeks - August 2021	31 weeks
7/28/2021	12,008,415	61.7%	36 weeks - September 2021	32 weeks
8/4/2021	12,204,784	62.7%	37 weeks - September 2021	33 weeks
8/11/2021	12,409,680	63.8%	37 weeks - September 2021	34 weeks
8/18/2021	12,609,588	64.8%	38 weeks - September 2021	35 weeks
8/25/2021	12,816,392	65.9%	38 weeks - September 2021	36 weeks
9/08/2021	13,226,742	68.0%	39 weeks - September 2021	38 weeks
9/15/2021	13,403,886	68.9%	40 weeks - September 2021	39 weeks

Mass vaccination sites were opened in the state in provide faster and more equitable results.

At the end of February 2021 the access to vaccination appointment slots remained complicated in NYS. The governor of NYS and the mayor of NYC decided to let separate groups (e.g., Walgreens, medical groups, state or city vaccination campuses) manage their own vaccination schedules. This creates opacity in identifying potential available slots and applying in time to these spots. Phone lines to organize appointments were often not reachable. But Huge Ma, a New York software developer, created an application that facilitates taking appointments for vaccines in NYS, turbovax.info, which connected to multiple sites offering vaccination appointments.

By the end of February 2021 there was a noticeable acceleration in the number of people getting vaccinated. In addition, the new J&J vaccine was approved on February 28, 2021. Its distribution was accompanied by longer overnight opening hours at Yankee Stadium, Javits Center and the NY State Fair Grounds.

On December 20, 2021, Governor Hochul announced New York State would provide $65 million to county governments in part to finance booster efforts.

== Impact on voting ==
The New York State Democratic presidential primary—along with special elections in the 27th congressional district; the 50th senate district; and the 12th, 31st, and 136th assembly districts—were originally scheduled for April 28. On March 13, 2020, Senator Skoufis proposed legislation to move these elections to June 23. The intent was to mitigate the spread of the coronavirus. On March 28, the New York State Board of Elections and Governor Cuomo postponed the elections to June 23. Subsequently, the Democratic presidential primary was canceled altogether, and most of the special elections were postponed until the general election in November.

=== Democratic presidential primary ===
On April 27, 2020, the Board of Elections changed its decision, and cancelled the Democratic presidential primary outright, by removing several candidates who suspended their campaigns from the ballot. The decision was first criticized by supporters of presidential candidate, Senator Bernie Sanders, who hoped to secure additional convention delegates, which would allow greater influence in the Democratic Party's platform. Other critics of the decision cited reduced voter turn out for down-ballot races, which unfairly benefits incumbent candidates. New York State Democratic Party Chair, Jay Jacobs, stated "our motivation right now is to avoid what happened in Wisconsin, where we in this situation are holding a primary that asks poll workers, many of them senior citizens, to risk their health for no particular purpose." Despite this move 42 of 62 New York counties, roughly 68% of counties in the New York State, would remain open for voting due to Congressional and State elections. At the time New York was the only state to cancel its presidential primary.

The decision was overturned on May 5 by Federal District Court Judge Analisa Torres in New York's Southern District, when presidential candidate Andrew Yang filed suit against the Board of Elections, asserting that the decision violated the 1st and 14th Amendments to the United States Constitution. Judge Torres stated "...the Democratic Commissioners' April 27 Resolution removing Yang, Sanders, and eight other Democratic presidential candidates from the ballot deprived them of associational rights under the First and Fourteenth Amendments to the Constitution."

An appeal was filed by the Board of Elections with the US Court of Appeals, Second Circuit. On May 19, it was ruled that the presidential primary could proceed as planned. The Board of Elections Co-chair, Douglas Kellner, said the Board would not pursue further appeals.

=== Absentee voting ===
On March 22, 2020, Attorney General Leticia James called for automatic absentee voting in the New York Democratic presidential primary. Cuomo later announced that he would investigate if his recently expanded executive powers would allow him to expand absentee ballot access. On April 9, by executive order of the Governor, all New York State residents were granted the right to apply for an absentee ballot using the state's online absentee ballot application in order to facilitate safe voting in the primary elections. As stated in the order, all voters would be required to "check the box for 'Temporary illness or physical disability' with no requirement for in-person signature or appearance to be able to access an absentee ballot." In an effort to ease barriers to access, Cuomo announced on April 24 that postage paid absentee ballot applications would be mailed to all registered voters in the State. Voters can still apply for a ballot online, or opt to vote in person.

=== State and local elections ===
Filings for independent nominations to petitions were postponed beginning March 31, 2020. On April 25 special elections were cancelled for the 50th senate district, and the 12th, 31st and 136th assembly districts, as well as the Queens Borough President and New York City Council District 37. These vacancies were filled in the November General Election. The 27th Congressional district special election was not cancelled.

== Effect on communities ==
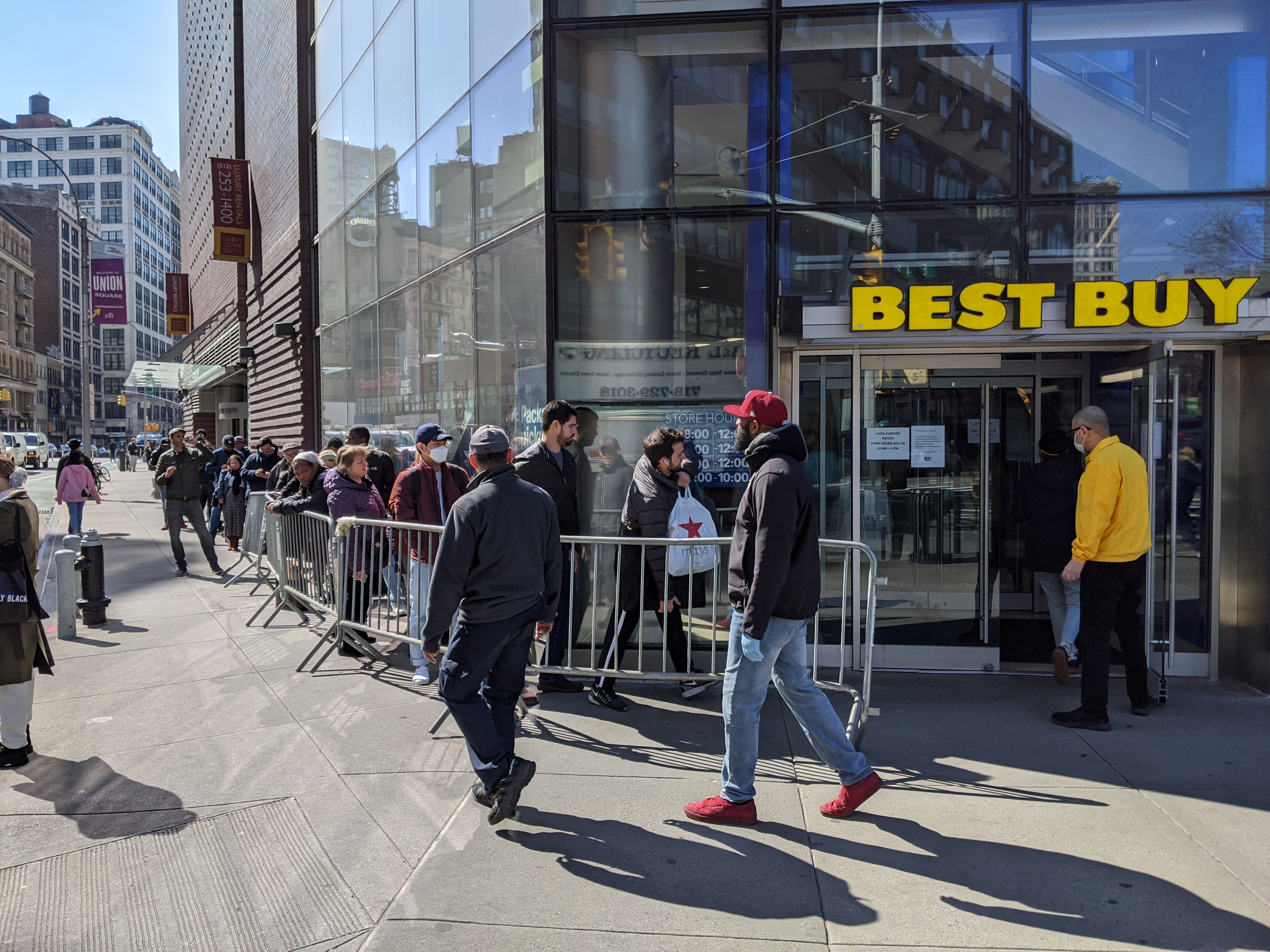
Best Buy was only letting a limited number of people into their Union Square store in New York City, March 18, 2020.

=== Lack of enforcement of self-quarantine policies ===
Self-quarantines for persons who tested positive or were symptomatic were not enforced due to a lack of resources. Several New York City area nurses expressed concerns that patients were not complying with self-quarantine guidelines, due to financial necessity or fear of losing their jobs. A New York State Nurses Association board member expressed concern that low-income patients who share rooms with other individuals may not be able to effectively self-isolate at their residences.

=== Implementation in Hasidic communities ===
Implementing social distancing was difficult in some communities dominated by Hasidic Jews. On March 19, 2020, the Orange County village of Kiryas Joel, home to 25,000 Satmar Hasidim, closed all 100 of its synagogues, as well as schools and mikvot, despite the centrality of religious observance in the community. It was estimated that 25–28 percent of its residents had tested positive, including the community's 73-year-old spiritual leader, Grand Rebbe Aaron Teitelbaum. On March 27, the county reported that Kiryas Joel, within the town of Palm Tree, had 234 confirmed cases, the most of any municipality in the county.

Some reports suggested that the Hasidic community was generally slow to implement measures designed to slow the spread of the virus. This reportedly led to one antisemitic incident. On March 23, 2020, a car dealership near Kiryas Joel refused to service a resident's car, telling him he had the virus.

An Orthodox Jewish physician, Vladimir Zelenko, who saw patients at his offices in both Kiryas Joel and Monsey, another predominantly Hasidic community in nearby Rockland County, claimed that the real infection rate in Kiryas Joel was much higher. This was disputed by local authorities. Zelenko, who had to self-isolate since he was missing a lung, said in daily YouTube videos that his office treated 500 patients (mostly in Kiryas Joel) for COVID-19, using the combination of hydroxychloroquine, azithromycin, and zinc sulfate, which in some trials yielded positive results in reducing symptoms. Zelenko claimed that 90 percent of the Hasidic community would become infected; the county's health commissioner and the village's emergency services department disputed that, pointing out that it was based on nine positive results out of 14 samples.

By April 9, Palm Tree had reported 428 cases, maintaining its lead among Orange County's municipalities, a lead it lost a week later. Leaders of the surrounding towns and villages repeated an earlier call by county executive Steve Neuhaus for the town to be declared a containment zone as the area of New Rochelle where a cluster had been identified a month earlier had been, a request denied at that time by Cuomo since the stay-at-home order for the entire state was more restrictive. The Orthodox Jewish Public Affairs Council had responded to such pressure by calling on local leadership to "stop scapegoating Jews of KJ when the problem is clearly widespread, and worse, everywhere in [the] county."

On October 12, Hasidic activist and City Council candidate Heshy Tischler was arrested for inciting a riot and unlawful imprisonment. Hundreds marched through the neighborhood of Borough Park, burning masks, chanting "Jewish Lives Matter" and attacking passersby.

=== Police and crime ===
At the beginning of March 2020, prior to the confirmation of the first case of COVID-19, and the onset of the coronavirus pandemic in New York City, a 20 percent spike in crime for the first two months of 2020 was reported. After movement in the city became restricted, New York City Police Commissioner Dermot Shea stated that the pandemic had curtailed crime. At the end of March, Shea said that crime had decreased sharply during the epidemic (other than car theft, which increased markedly), though there was concern that domestic violence was not being reported. As of April 8, 2,103 uniformed members and 373 civilian members had tested positive for the virus while 13 had died.

In early April, the state's Division of Criminal Justice Services reported that crime had dropped considerably since late February, both in the city and state compared to the same period the year before. In the city, combined felony and misdemeanor arrests were down 43 percent, with the rest of the state recording a 69 percent drop. Cuomo praised the drop as a result of social distancing, since it helped keep hospitals and first responders free to deal with the pandemic.

=== Tensions over city residents relocating to rural areas ===
Some residents of New York City and its inner suburbs who own, or can afford to rent, property in rural areas upstate or on eastern Long Island aroused local resentment for doing so during the pandemic. Steve McLaughlin, executive of Rensselaer County, east of Albany, asked Cuomo to issue an order banning all non-essential travel upstate from the city, after city residents booked all available local lodging. Seven of 51 cases the county had as of April 2 were city residents, and the county feared it did not have sufficient healthcare infrastructure to handle a large outbreak; McLaughlin issued an order requiring any recent arrivals from the city to quarantine themselves for 14 days, during which law enforcement would check on them regularly.

Similarly, Greene County, in the Catskills just south of Albany, posted on its website a letter asking people to refrain from traveling there, especially from New York City or Westchester. "There is no hospital in Greene County," wrote the chairman of the county legislature. "This limits our ability to serve a large number of people requiring higher levels of care for COVID-19 patients and other illnesses." The legislatures of neighboring Delaware and Sullivan counties made similar requests.

In the Hamptons, on the eastern end of Long Island's South Fork, a longtime summer destination for city residents, rental rates quadrupled as the population nearly doubled. While many year-round residents were aware that the towns' economy depended on seasonal residents, they believed their resources were stretched to the limit.

=== New York renters and homeowners ===
Cuomo initially announced a state moratorium for both residential and commercial evictions on March 20, 2020. This moratorium was an attempt to prevent evictions during the height of the COVID-19 public health emergency. He then signed the Tenant Safe Harbor Act, which had passed the New York State Senate and New York State Assembly on May 27, into law on June 30. The Tenant Safe Harbor Act gave an additional layer of protection to tenants experiencing financial hardship during the public health emergency, as it prevented courts from ever evicting on the basis of non-payment that accrued or came due during the COVID-19 period. Previously, a tenant who was unable to pay rent could be evicted on the basis of non-payment as soon as the moratorium ended. On September 28, Cuomo announced the Tenant Safe Harbor Act would be extended and expanded through January 1, 2021.

In addition to the Tenant Safe Harbor Act, Cuomo signed the COVID-19 Emergency Eviction and Foreclosure Prevention Act of 2020 into effect on December 28. This piece of legislation further safeguards New York renters and homeowners and ensures they can remain in their homes. The Act suspends residential eviction and residential foreclosure proceedings until May 1, 2021, and allows renters and homeowners to submit a declaration of hardship. The Act also prevents credit discrimination, and negative credit reporting due to the COVID-19 pandemic.

== Impact on sports ==
Most of the state's sports teams were affected. Major League Baseball cancelled the remainder of spring training on March 12, 2020, and on March 16 it announced that the season would be postponed indefinitely, after the recommendation from the CDC to restrict events of more than 50 people for the next eight weeks, affecting the New York Yankees and New York Mets. The National Basketball Association suspended the season for 30 days starting March 12, affecting the New York Knicks and Brooklyn Nets. The National Hockey League season was suspended indefinitely on March 12, affecting the New York Rangers, New York Islanders, and Buffalo Sabres. Major League Soccer postponed the season for 30 days starting March 12, affecting the New York Red Bulls and New York City FC. On March 12, the National Lacrosse League postponed the remainder of their season until further notice, affecting the seasons of the Buffalo Bandits, Rochester Knighthawks, and New York Riptide. The XFL suspended its season on March 12, affecting the inaugural season of the New York Guardians.

In college sports, the National Collegiate Athletic Association cancelled all winter and spring tournaments, most notably the Division I men's and women's basketball tournaments, affecting colleges and universities statewide. On March 16, the National Junior College Athletic Association also canceled the remainder of the winter seasons as well as the spring seasons.

The state's high school basketball playoffs had begun in early March with no spectators allowed. On March 12, the New York State Public High School Athletic Association (NYSPHSAA) suspended remaining winter sports championship contests in all sports that still had not decided them: boys' and girls' basketball, ice hockey, and bowling.

On March 17, four members of the Brooklyn Nets, including Kevin Durant, were confirmed positive for COVID-19.

A little over a month later, NYSPSHSAA announced that Sections 8 and 11, which cover all of Long Island's high schools, had voted to cancel all spring high school and middle school sports seasons. "It was not an easy [decision] to make," said Section 11 executive director Tom Combs, "however, in what the world is experiencing at this time, it is the most reasonable and prudent decision to make." The other nine sections of the state, in areas which in some cases were not experiencing the pandemic so severely, had not made decisions yet and were still planning for the possibility of a short spring season at the end of May and in early June. Championships for any spring sports, were they to be held, would likely have to be moved to other locations since they had been scheduled to be played on Long Island; on April 27, they were canceled.

At the beginning of May, when Cuomo announced that the remainder of the school year in the state was canceled, all remaining contingency plans for spring high school sports statewide were canceled as well.

In mid-May, Cuomo announced that horse racing statewide and auto races at Watkins Glen International in Schuyler County may resume, with no spectators allowed, at the beginning of June. The NASCAR race weekend scheduled for Watkins Glen International in August was cancelled due to New York's 14-day quarantine requirement for out-of-state travelers coming from states with a high rate of COVID-19 cases; this includes North Carolina and Florida, where many drivers and teams in NASCAR are based. The race weekend at Watkins Glen International was replaced by the road course at Daytona International Speedway in Daytona Beach, Florida.

On June 20, Cuomo announced that the Yankees and the Mets baseball teams would move from conducting spring training in Florida to New York. The Yankees would be at Yankee Stadium and the Mets at Citi Field. Cuomo added that, "[...] we've determined it's possible for the Yankees and the Mets to safely conduct spring training in the state this year and are thrilled to begin reopening America's national pastime right here in New York."

On July 24, Governor Cuomo virtually officiated the start of the Mets home opener at Citi Field against the Atlanta Braves with no fans in attendance.

On July 31, the Yankees held their home opener game at Yankee Stadium against the Boston Red Sox with no fans in attendance.

On August 31, the 2020 US Open (tennis) kicked off with various safety precautions and void of spectators due to COVID-19, for the first time in the tournament's history.

== Impact on outdoor recreation ==
The ban on large gatherings meant that the annual "First Cast" ceremony at the Junction Pool, a popular fly fishing spot, in the Sullivan County hamlet of Roscoe, marking the April 1 opening of trout season, could not be held. The season still opened and the state's Department of Environmental Conservation (DEC) encouraged anglers to take to the state's streams as long as they continued to practice social distancing. Many stores in Roscoe that catered to them were nevertheless closed and limited to filling orders online. Anglers in Central New York reported that day that they were able to easily maintain social distancing while in the waters of Ninemile Creek, a practice necessary to the sport in any event since it prevented them from getting their lines tangled with each other. They appreciated the opportunity to get outside on a day with good weather for fishing and forget the pandemic, and some told the Syracuse Post-Standard they had good catches as well.

DEC announced on April 7 that the state's spring wild turkey hunting season in May, and the youth turkey weekend at the end of April, were still going on. It advised hunters, in addition to the usual hunting safety practices, to continue social distancing while hunting and take other measures, such as buying supplies online and hunting close to home. Hunters were further advised to share blinds with other hunters only if they lived in the same residence, and to hunt alone where possible.

=== Park closures and use restrictions ===
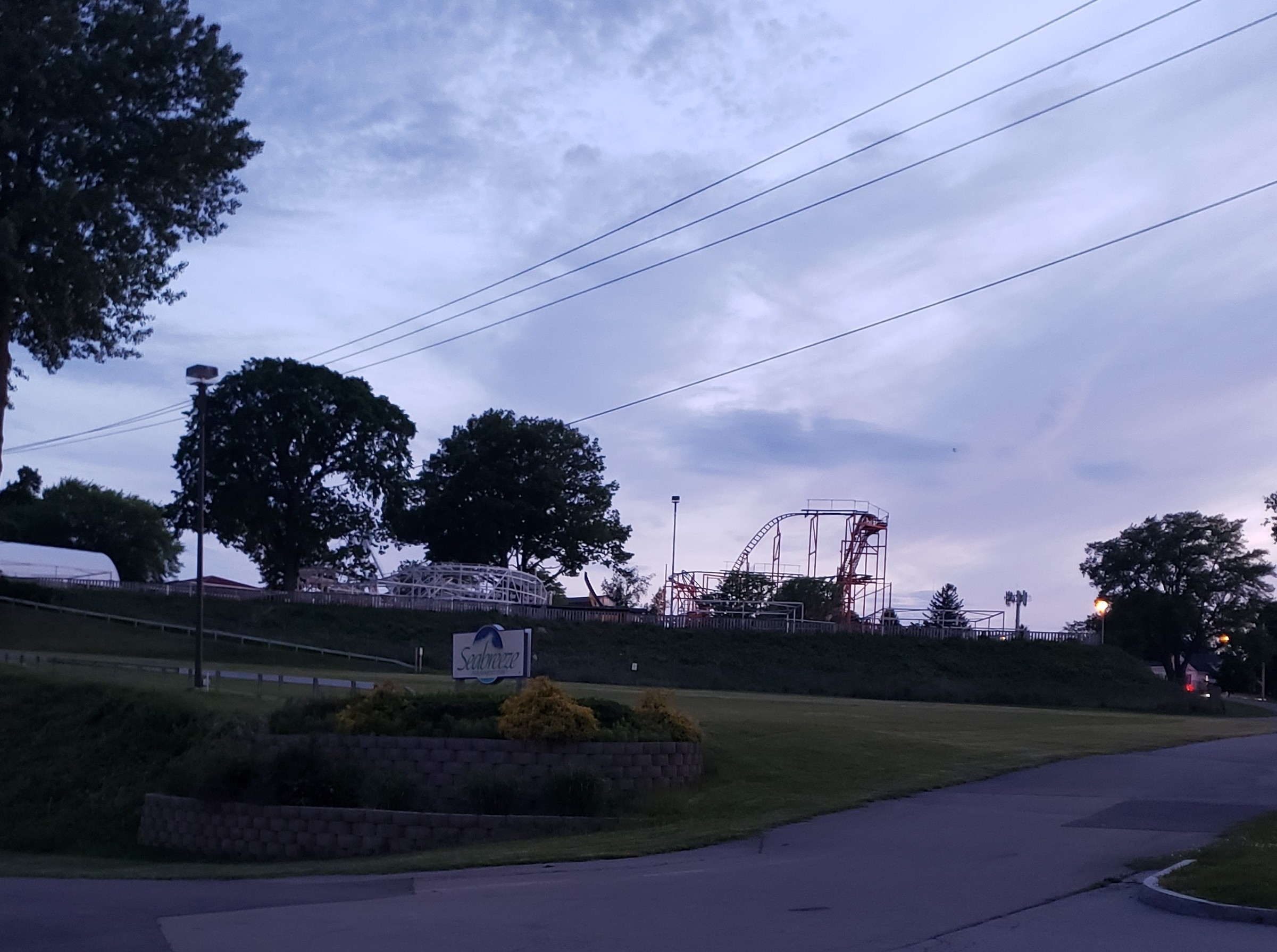
As of June 4, 2020, Seabreeze in Irondequoit and other amusement parks around the state remain closed.

On April 7, 2020, Rockland and Sullivan counties closed their parks for two weeks. Residents had been making heavy use of them during the lockdown, making it difficult to enforce social distancing. A week later the Palisades Interstate Park Commission (PIPC) closed Nyack Beach and Rockland Lake state parks in Rockland County; local and county government officials had urged the move since the parks had grown crowded with visitors on recent warm days after the county and its towns closed their own parks. "While this is a tough call it is the right thing to do short term," said county executive Ed Day, who said the decision would be reviewed in two weeks.

On April 9, Cuomo removed golf courses, boat launches and marinas from the list of essential businesses allowed to remain open, forcing all courses in the state of New York to close until at least April 29. The move was a result of New Jersey and Pennsylvania having ordered courses to close, resulting in crowding at New York's courses near borders with those states. On April 18, Empire State Development modified that order to allow courses to open as long as no employees such as caddies were on the course, meaning golfers must carry their own bags and cannot use carts; three weeks later that order was again modified to allow the use of carts as a reasonable accommodation for disabled golfers, per the Americans with Disabilities Act.

The Rockland County park closures were supplemented April 24 by the PIPC's closure of all roads through Bear Mountain and Harriman state parks, where the Anthony Wayne Recreation Area was serving as a testing site, save Seven Lakes Drive, and exits that led to those roads from Palisades Interstate Parkway, in not only Rockland but neighboring Orange County. Trail shelters were also closed, although backpackers were still allowed to set up camp within 300 ft (91 m) of the shelters. Permitholders were still allowed to boat on the parks' lakes; sales of new permits were suspended through May 7.

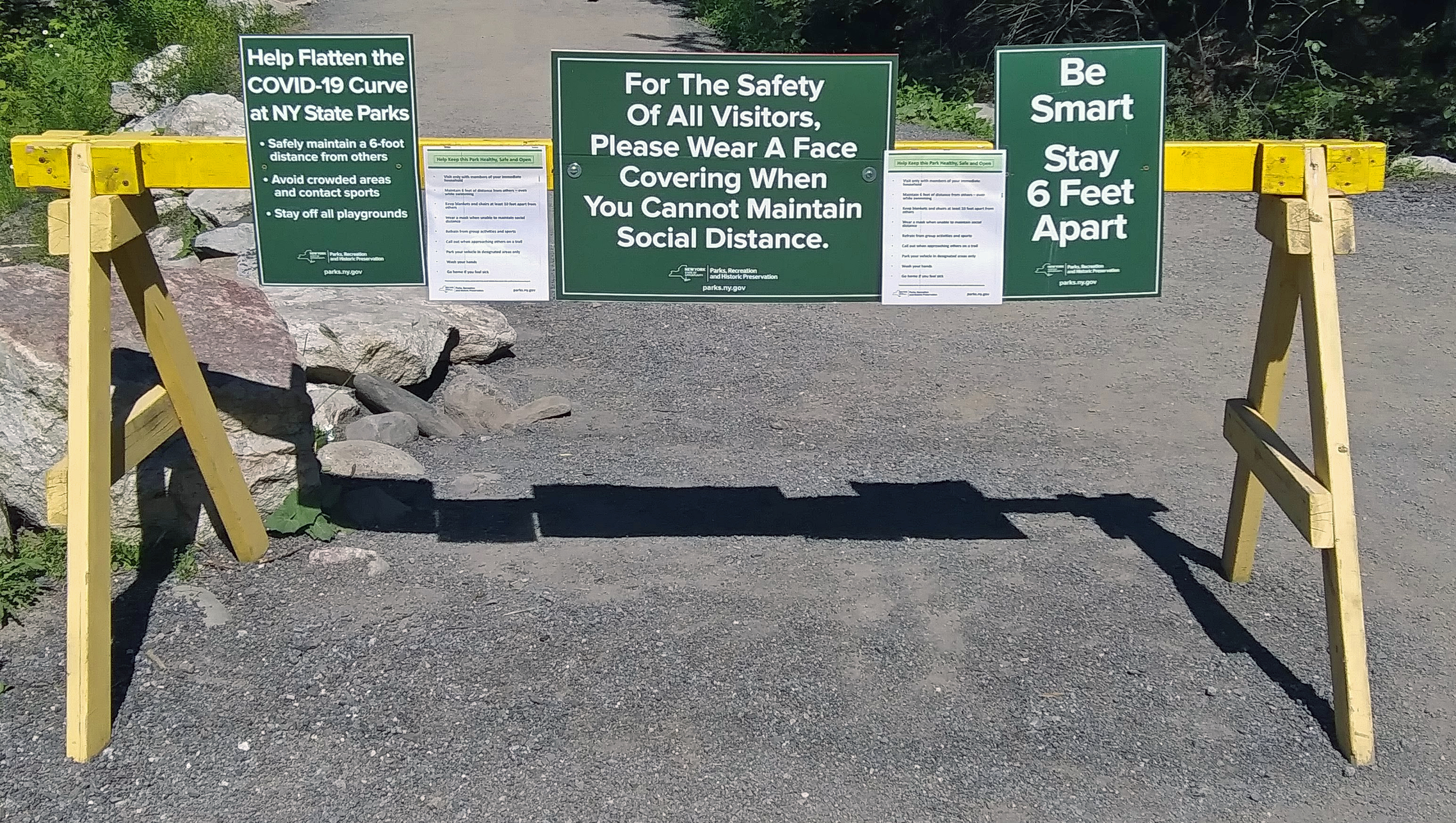
Signs at Awosting Falls trailhead in Minnewaska State Park Preserve

In Ulster County, parking lots at Minnewaska State Park Preserve in the Shawangunks were limited to 50 percent of capacity to prevent overcrowding. All recreational activities within the park other than foot travel and motorless bicycling were prohibited, including climbing and bouldering. Restrooms within the park were closed as well.

In Dutchess, Putnam and Westchester counties, many popular trails and trailheads alongside the Hudson River in Hudson Highlands State Park were closed since hikers arriving by car or Metro-North's Hudson Line trains must walk on the side of narrow roads and thus cannot keep six feet apart. Among them were all trails on Breakneck Ridge and Bull Hill north of Cold Spring.

In the Catskill Mountains, DEC announced April 5 it was closing the trail and viewing platforms at Kaaterskill Falls in Greene County, which also attract many hikers to a small space. All fire towers on state land in the Catskill Park were closed. DEC also suspended overnight camping at easily accessible and popular locations around the state, and stopped issuing permits for backcountry camping by groups larger than 10, or for more than three days.

New York City's Department of Environmental Protection, which operates the reservoirs of the city's water supply system, announced that recreational boating season on its four Catskill reservoirs, which normally begins May 1, would be postponed to May 23. Fishing from rowboats and the shoreline was still permitted.

== Statistics ==
Initially, under Governor Cuomo, New York counted only those COVID-19 deaths that occurred in hospitals, nursing homes, and adult care facilities. This excluded people who died at home or in other locations. Following Cuomo's resignation, beginning on August 24, 2021, New York began using the death certificate data provided to the CDC, which includes deaths in any location within the state. This increased New York's death toll by nearly 12,000; the newly totaled number of deaths up to that point was 55,395.

New York (state) case density by county
County	Cases	Deaths	Cases /mil	Deaths /mil	Deaths /case %	Case dens. /mi^{2}	Population	Pop. dens. /mi^{2}	Area mi^{2}	Case dens. /km^{2}	Pop. dens. /km^{2}	Area km^{2}
Statewide	7,111,426	69,185	50,079	1,544	1.4	111.4	19,453,561	413	47,126	11.7	159	122,057
Albany County	79,786	628	5,937.69	324.1	5.46	2.36	305,506	573	533	0.91	221	1,380
Allegany County	10,016	159	759.4	43.4	5.71	0.03	46,091	45	1,034	0.01	17	2,678
Bronx County	518,365	6,626	31,712	2,264	7.14	677.62	1,418,207	24,695	57.43	261.18	9,518	149
Broome County	59,563	607	1,721.90	115.5	6.71	0.46	190,488	266	715	0.18	103	1,852
Cattaraugus County	17,825	234	696.3	26.3	3.77	0.04	76,117	58	1,310	0.02	22	3,393
Cayuga County	17,676	165	679.1	13.1	1.92	0.06	76,576	89	864	0.02	34	2,238
Chautauqua County	27,205	316	283.7	7.9	2.78	0.02	126,903	85	1,500	0.01	33	3,885
Chemung County	24,766	242	1,497.80	12	0.8	0.3	83,456	203	410.81	0.12	78	1,064
Chenango County	11,129	135	2,097.10	21.2	1.01	0.11	47,207	53	898.85	0.04	20	2,328
Clinton County	21,417	114	770.3	49.7	6.45	0.06	80,485	72	1,118	0.02	28	2,896
Columbia County	13,300	163	3,649.50	252.3	6.91	0.33	59,461	92	648	0.13	35	1,67
Cortland County	6,194	89	672.5	21	3.13	0.06	47,581	95	502	0.02	37	1,300
Delaware County	9,718	86	1,654	45.3	2.74	0.05	44,135	30	1,468	0.02	12	3,802
Dutchess County	86,613	805	10,488.80	254.9	3.15	5.88	294,218	357	825	1.44	138	2,137
Erie County	269,977	2,903	4,038.30	291.7	7.22	3.02/mi^{2}	918,702	749	1,227	1.17	289	3,178
Essex County	7,341	71	786.2	0	0	0.02/mi^{2}	36,885	19	1,916	0.01	7	4,962
Franklin County	11,640	52	299.9	0	0	0.01/mi^{2}	50,022	29	1,697	0	11	4,395
Fulton County	16,121	182	1,536.10	56.2	3.66	0.15/mi^{2}	53,383	100	533	0.06	39	1,380
Genesee County	15,322	198	2,706	52.4	1.94	0.31/mi^{2}	57,280	116	495	0.12	45	1,282
Greene County	10,460	144	3,200	63.6	1.99	0.23/mi^{2}	47,188	72	658	0.09	28	1,704
Hamilton County	944	5	679.3	0	0	0/mi^{2}	4,416	2	1,808	0	1	4,683
Herkimer County	14,245	197	1,011.10	48.9	4.84	0.04/mi^{2}	61,319	42	1,458	0.02	16	3,776
Jefferson County	25,132	146	564.5	0	0	0.03/mi^{2}	109,834	59	1,857	0.01	23	4,810
Kings County (Brooklyn)	904,223	9,754	21,659.4	1,664.90	9.1	483.37/mi^{2}	2,559,903	26,418	96.9	186.61	10.199	251
Lewis County	6,982	53	342.3	152.1	44.44	0.01/mi^{2}	26,296	20	1,290	0	8	3,341
Livingston County	13,314	128	1,319.30	31.8	2.41	0.13/mi^{2}	62,914	98	640	0.05	38	1,658
Madison County	16,129	140	2,551.40	70.5	2.76	0.27/mi^{2}	70,941	107	662	0.11	41	1,715
New York County (Manhattan)	597,183	4,240	16,258	1,233	7.58	1081/mi^{2}	1,628,706	71,341	22.83	417.39	27,545	59.13
Monroe County	193,545	1,854	2,111.2	157.7	7.47	1.15/mi^{2}	741,770	543	1,366	0.44	210	3,538
Montgomery County	14,600	228	1,137.7	81.3	7.14	0.14/mi^{2}	49,221	120	410	0.05	46	1,062
Nassau County	537,736	4,317	27,105.4	1,304.40	4.81	81.19/mi^{2}	1,356,924	2,995	453	31.36	1,157	1,173
Niagara County	59,786	632	2,331.8	124.2	5.33	0.43/mi^{2}	209,281	184	1,140	0.17	71	2,953
Oneida County	69,768	886	2,138.4	78.7	3.68	0.4/mi^{2}	228,671	189	1,213	0.16	73	3,142
Onondaga County	143,637	1,205	2,273.5	78.2	3.44	1.3/mi^{2}	460,528	571	806	0.5	221	2,088
Ontario County	23,768	194	865.4	82	9.47	0.14/mi^{2}	109,777	166	662	0.06	64	1,715
Orange County	142,627	1,255	23,479	854.7	4.38	10.77/mi^{2}	384,940	459	839	4.16	177	2,173
Orleans County	9,751	120	2,403.8	223	9.28	0.12/mi^{2}	40,352	49	817	0.05	19	2,116
Oswego County	32,238	212	563.5	25.6	4.55	0.05/mi^{2}	117,124	89	1,312	0.02	34	3,398
Otsego County	11,440	99	1,126.2	67.2	5.97	0.07/mi^{2}	59,493	59	1,003	0.03	23	2,598
Putnam County	31,969	149	11,635.5	457.7	3.93	4.65/mi^{2}	98,320	400	246	1.8	154	637
Queens County	857,968	9,378	27,350	2,177.2	7.96	570.25/mi^{2}	2,253,858	20,850	108.1	220.2	8.050	280
Rensselaer County	42,338	319	2,028.8	88.2	4.35	0.48/mi^{2}	158,714	239	665	0.19	92	1,722
Richmond County	213,517	1,706	28,258.32	1,520.6	5.38	351.04/mi^{2}	476,143	4,645	102.5	135.78	1,797	265
Rockland County	120,061	1,275	40,136.41	1,593.1	3.97	60.43/mi^{2}	325,789	1,637	199	23.35	633	515
Saratoga County	59,551	387	3,369.2	120.7	3.58	0.43/mi^{2}	107,740	128	844	0.17	49	2,186
Schenectady County	44,298	384	2,292.7	108.8	4.74	2.51/mi^{2}	229,863	1,095	210	0.97	423	544
Schoharie County	6,300	41	289.8	6.4	2.22	0.07/mi^{2}	155,299	248	626	0.03	96	1,621
Schuyler County	4,061	28	258.1	0	0	0.02/mi^{2}	30,999	91	342	0.01	35	886
Seneca County	6,971	94	2,527.1	112.3	4.44	0.14/mi^{2}	17,807	55	325	0.05	21	842
St. Lawrence County	25,268	210	5,203.4	58.8	1.13	0.06/mi^{2}	34,016	12	2,821	0.02	5	7,306
Steuben County	23,314	262	2,453.4	398.4	16.24	0.17/mi^{2}	95,379	68	1,404	0.06	26	3,636
Suffolk County	566,319	4,938	23,604.9	850.6	3.6	14.69/mi^{2}	1,476,601	622	2,373	5.67	240	6,146
Sullivan County	23,848	146	12,607.4	291.7	2.31	0.95/mi^{2}	75,432	76	997	0.37	29	2,582
Tioga County	13,007	88	1,867.1	166	8.89	0.17/mi^{2}	48,203	92	523	0.07	36	1,355
Tompkins County	24,729	94	1,262.5	0	0	0.27/mi^{2}	102,180	215	476	0.1	83	1,233
Ulster County	41,820	403	7,889.7	157.7	2	1.21/mi^{2}	177,573	153	1,161	0.47	59	3,007
Warren County	18,035	144	2,940.1	156.4	5.32	0.22/mi^{2}	63,944	73	870	0.08	28	2,253
Washington County	15,232	130	3,039	81.7	2.69	0.22/mi^{2}	61,204	72	846	0.08	28	2,191
Wayne County	20,180	194	834.1	11.1	1.33	0.05/mi^{2}	89,918	65	1,384	0.02	25	3,585
Westchester County	330,378	2,948	34,411	1,404.6	4.1	59.25/mi^{2}	967,506	1,935	500	22.88	747	1,295
Wyoming County	9,314	87	1,731.1	125.4	7.25	0.12/mi^{2}	39,859	67	596	0.04	26	1,544
Yates County	4,089	40	722.5	40.1	5.56	0.05/mi^{2}	24,913	66	376	0.02	26	974
Updated May 4, 2020

Confirmed COVID-19 cases in New York State over time
Date (2020)	New York City	Rest of state	Total cases	% change	Ref.
March 2	0	1	1	N/A	
March 3	0	1	1	0.00%	
March 4	2	1	3	200.00%	
March 5	4	21	25	733.33%	
March 6	11	25	36	44.00%	
March 7	11	49	60	66.67%	
March 8	15	73	88	46.67%	
March 9	27	124	151	71.59%	
March 10	51	144	195	29.14%	
March 11	64	187	251	28.72%	
March 12	112	241	353	40.64%	
March 13	213	304	517	46.46%	
March 14	287	361	648	25.34%	
March 15	457	485	942	45.37%	
March 16	643	731	1,374	45.86%	
March 17	1,340	1,043	2,383	73.44%	
March 18	2,471	1,681	4,152	74.23%	
March 19	4,408	2,694	7,102	71.05%	
March 20	6,213	4,143	10,356	45.82%	
March 21	9,045	6,123	15,168	46.47%	
March 22	12,305	8,570	20,875	37.63%	
March 23	14,904	10,761	25,665	22.95%	
March 24	17,856	12,955	30,811	20.05%	
March 25	21,393	15,865	37,258	20.92%	
March 26	25,398	19,237	44,635	19.80%	
March 27	29,766	22,552	52,318	17.21%	
March 28	33,768	25,745	59,513	13.75%	
March 29	37,453	29,044	66,497	11.74%	
March 30	43,139	32,656	75,795	13.98%	
March 31	47,439	36,273	83,712	10.45%	
April 1	51,809	40,572	92,381	10.36%	
April 2	57,159	45,704	102,863	11.35%	
April 3	63,306	50,398	113,704	10.54%	
April 4	67,551	54,480	122,031	7.32%	
April 5	72,181	58,508	130,689	7.09%	
April 6	76,876	61,987	138,836	6.23%	
April 7	81,803	67,513	149,316	7.55%	
April 8	87,028	72,909	159,937	7.11%	
April 9	92,384	78,128	170,512	6.61%	
April 10	98,308	82,150	180,458	5.83%	
April 11	103,208	85,486	188,694	4.55%	
April 12	106,863	88,168	195,031	3.36%	
April 13	110,425	91,783	202,208	3.68%	
April 14	118,302	95,477	213,779	5.72%	
April 15	123,146	99,138	222,284	3.98%	
April 16	127,352	102,290	229,642	3.31%	
April 17	131,263	105,469	236,732	3.09%	
April 18	134,436	108,350	242,786	2.56%	
April 19	136,806	110,706	247,512	1.95%	
April 20	139,385	112,305	251,690	1.69%	
April 21	142,432	114,784	257,216	2.20%	
April 22	145,855	117,605	263,460	2.43%	
April 23	150,473	121,117	271,590	3.09%	
April 24	155,113	127,030	282,143	3.89%	
April 25	158,258	129,787	288,045	2.09%	
April 26	160,489	131,507	291,996	1.37%	
April 27	162,338	132,768	295,106	1.07%	
April 28	164,841	134,850	299,691	1.55%	
April 29	167,478	136,894	304,372	1.56%	
April 30	169,690	138,624	308,314	1.30%	
May 1	172,354	140,623	312,977	1.51%	
May 2	174,331	142,084	316,415	1.10%	
May 3	175,651	143,302	318,953	0.80%	
May 4	176,874	144,318	321,192	0.70%	
May 5	178,351	145,627	323,978	0.87%	
May 6	180,216	147,253	327,469	1.08%	
May 7	181,783	148,624	330,407	0.90%	
May 8	183,289	149,833	333,122	0.82%	
May 9	184,417	150,978	335,395	0.68%	
May 10	185,357	151,698	337,055	0.49%	
May 11	186,123	152,362	338,485	0.42%	
May 12	187,250	153,521	340,771	0.64%	
May 13	188,545	154,506	343,051	0.70%	
May 14	190,357	155,456	345,813	0.81%	
May 15	191,600	156,632	348,232	0.70%	
May 16	192,593	157,528	350,121	0.54%	
May 17	193,230	158,141	351,371	0.36%	
May 18	193,821	159,024	352,845	0.42%	
May 19	194,550	159,820	354,370	0.43%	
May 20	195,675	160,783	356,458	0.59%	
May 21	196,484	161,670	358,154	0.48%	
May 22	197,266	162,660	359,926	0.49%	
May 23	198,123	163,392	361,515	0.44%	
May 24	198,731	164,033	362,764	0.35%	
May 25	199,301	164,535	363,836	0.30%	
May 26	199,968	164,997	364,965	0.31%	
May 27	201,051	165,682	366,733	0.48%	
May 28	201,999	166,285	368,284	0.42%	
May 29	202,751	166,909	369,660	0.37%	
May 30	203,303	167,467	370,770	0.30%	
May 31	203,764	167,947	371,711	0.25%	
June 1	204,337	168,663	373,040	0.36%	
June 2	204,872	169,213	374,085	0.28%	
June 3	205,406	169,727	375,133	0.28%	
June 4	205,940	170,268	376,208	0.29%	
June 5	206,511	170,805	377,316	0.29%	
June 6	206,969	171,128	378,097	0.21%	
June 7	207,353	171,446	378,799	0.19%	
June 8	207,693	171,789	379,482	0.18%	
June 9	208,118	172,038	380,156	0.18%	
June 10	208,517	172,375	380,892	0.19%	
June 11	208,954	172,760	381,714	0.22%	
June 12	209,493	173,137	382,630	0.24%	
June 13	209,878	173,446	383,324	0.18%	
June 14	210,259	173,685	383,944	0.16%	
June 15	210,591	173,984	384,575	0.16%	
June 16	210,941	174,201	385,142	0.14%	
June 17	211,260	174,500	385,760	0.16%	
June 18	211,670	174,886	386,556	0.21%	
June 19	212,061	175,211	387,272	0.19%	
June 20	212,446	175,490	387,936	0.17%	
June 21	212,741	175,747	388,488	0.14%	
June 22	213,056	176,029	389,085	0.15%	
June 23	213,348	176,318	389,666	0.15%	
June 24	213,699	176,716	390,415	0.19%	
June 25	214,070	177,150	391,220	0.21%	
June 26	214,434	177,489	391,923	0.18%	
June 27	214,750	177,789	392,539	0.16%	
June 28	214,939	177,991	392,930	0.10%	
June 29	215,179	178,275	393,454	0.13%	
June 30	215,475	178,604	394,079	0.16%	
July 1	215,902	179,052	394,954	0.22%	
July 2	216,362	179,510	395,872	0.23%	
July 3	216,730	179,868	396,598	0.18%	
July 4	216,969	180,162	397,131	0.13%	
July 5	217,216	180,433	397,649	0.13%	
July 6	217,488	180,749	398,237	0.15%	
July 7	217,777	181,152	398,929	0.17%	
July 8	218,052	181,461	399,513	0.15%	
July 9	218,403	181,896	400,299	0.20%	
July 10	218,701	182,319	401,029	0.18%	
July 11	219,051	182,655	401,706	0.17%	
July 12	219,301	182,962	402,263	0.14%	
July 13	219,616	183,559	403,175	0.23%	
July 14	219,982	184,024	404,006	0.21%	
July 15	220,367	184,408	404,775	0.19%	
July 16	220,734	184,817	405,551	0.19%	
July 17	221,121	185,184	406,305	0.19%	
July 18	221,419	185,388	406,807	0.12%	
July 19	221,703	185,623	407,326	0.13%	
July 20	222,094	186,067	408,181	0.21%	
July 21	222,444	186,442	408,886	0.17%	
July 22	222,832	186,865	409,697	0.20%	
July 23	223,192	187,258	410,450	0.18%	
July 24	223,532	187,668	411,200	0.18%	
July 25	223,761	187,975	411,736	0.13%	
July 26	224,051	188,293	412,344	0.15%	
July 27	224,249	188,629	412,878	0.13%	
July 28	224,551	189,042	413,593	0.17%	
July 29	224,863	189,507	414,370	0.19%	
July 30	225,148	189,886	415,014	0.16%	
July 31	225,460	190,307	415,767	0.18%	
August 1	225,723	190,575	416,298	0.13%	
August 2	225,964	190,879	416,843	0.13%	
August 3	226,280	191,309	417,589	0.18%	
August 4	226,581	191,644	418,225	0.15%	
August 5	226,914	192,014	418,928	0.17%	
August 6	227,258	192,384	419,642	0.17%	
August 7	227,584	192,761	420,345	0.17%	
August 8	227,832	193,028	420,860	0.12%	
August 9	228,069	193,267	421,336	0.11%	
August 10	228,343	193,660	422,003	0.16%	
August 11	228,729	193,974	422,703	0.17%	
August 12	229,167	194,273	423,440	0.17%	
August 13	229,534	194,633	424,167	0.17%	
August 14	229,916	194,985	424,901	0.17%	
August 15	230,223	195,285	425,508	0.14%	
August 16	230,458	195,458	425,916	0.10%	
August 17	230,742	195,829	426,571	0.15%	
August 18	231,015	196,187	427,202	0.15%	
August 19	231,288	196,515	427,803	0.14%	
August 20	231,574	196,938	428,512	0.17%	
August 21	231,841	197,324	429,165	0.15%	
August 22	232,120	197,617	429,737	0.13%	
August 23	232,334	197,811	430,145	0.09%	
August 24	232,565	198,209	430,774	0.15%	
August 25	232,825	198,515	431,340	0.13%	
August 26	233,140	198,991	432,131	0.18%	
August 27	233,410	199,357	432,767	0.15%	
August 28	233,688	199,714	433,402	0.15%	
August 29	233,969	200,131	434,100	0.16%	
August 30	234,237	200,519	434,756	0.15%	
August 31	234,542	200,968	435,510	0.17%	
September 1	234,806	201,412	436,218	0.16%	
September 2	235,110	201,997	437,107	0.20%	
September 3	235,435	202,536	437,971	0.20%	
September 4	235,714	203,058	438,772	0.18%	
September 5	236,009	203,492	439,501	0.17%	
September 6	236,212	203,809	440,021	0.12%	
September 7	236,434	204,144	440,578	0.13%	
September 8	236,647	204,507	441,154	0.13%	
September 9	236,983	204,928	441,911	0.17%	
September 10	237,252	205,539	442,791	0.20%	
September 11	237,558	206,082	443,640	0.19%	
September 12	237,802	206,563	444,365	0.16%	
September 13	238,067	206,881	444,948	0.13%	
September 14	238,373	207,341	445,714	0.17%	
September 15	238,625	207,741	446,366	0.15%	
September 16	238,958	208,304	447,262	0.20%	
September 17	239,306	208,746	448,052	0.18%	
September 18	239,798	209,240	449,038	0.22%	
September 19	240,196	209,704	449,900	0.19%	
September 20	240,456	210,017	450,473	0.13%	
September 21	240,807	210,420	451,227	0.17%	
September 22	241,087	210,805	451,892	0.15%	
September 23	241,511	211,336	452,847	0.21%	
September 24	241,882	211,873	453,755	0.20%	
September 25	242,311	212,449	454,760	0.22%	
September 26	242,693	212,933	455,626	0.19%	
September 27	243,072	213,388	456,460	0.18%	
September 28	243,595	214,054	457,649	0.26%	
September 29	244,041	214,608	458,649	0.22%	
September 30	244,574	215,457	460,031	0.30%	
October 1	245,173	216,456	461,629	0.35%	
October 2	245,885	217,475	463,360	0.37%	
October 3	246,417	218,165	464,582	0.26%	
October 4	246,885	218,630	465,515	0.20%	
October 5	247,452	219,456	466,908	0.30%	
October 6	248,000	220,268	468,268	0.29%	
October 7	248,696	221,408	470,104	0.39%	
October 8	249,320	222,376	471,696	0.34%	
October 9	249,895	223,248	473,143	0.31%	
October 10	250,364	223,922	474,286	0.24%	
October 11	250,757	224,558	475,315	0.22%	
October 12	251,302	225,406	476,708	0.29%	
October 13	251,766	226,174	477,940	0.26%	
October 14	252,274	227,126	479,400	0.30%	
October 15	252,934	228,173	481,107	0.36%	
October 16	253,740	229,151	482,891	0.37%	
October 17	254,352	229,929	484,281	0.29%	
October 18	254,771	230,508	485,279	0.21%	
October 19	255,207	231,273	486,480	0.25%	
October 20	256,046	232,460	488,506	0.42%	
October 21	256,576	233,558	490,134	0.33%	
October 22	257,147	234,624	491,771	0.33%	
October 23	257,902	235,930	493,832	0.42%	
October 24	258,555	236,909	495,464	0.33%	
October 25	258,979	237,676	496,655	0.24%	
October 26	259,710	238,936	498,646	0.40%	
October 27	260,547	240,130	500,677	0.41%	
October 28	261,607	241,569	503,176	0.50%	
October 29	262,510	242,921	505,431	0.45%	
October 30	263,209	244,271	507,480	0.41%	
October 31	264,155	245,580	509,735	0.44%	
November 1	264,796	246,572	511,368	0.32%	
November 2	265,598	248,091	513,689	0.45%	
November 3	266,393	249,422	515,815	0.41%	
November 4	267,460	251,352	518,812	0.58%	
November 5	268,663	253,358	522,021	0.62%	
November 6	269,828	255,780	525,608	0.69%	
November 7	271,219	257,817	529,036	0.65%	
November 8	272,375	259,805	532,180	0.59%	
November 9	273,583	262,562	536,145	0.75%	
November 10	275,314	265,651	540,965	0.90%	
November 11	276,976	268,786	545,762	0.89%	
November 12	278,802	272,361	551,163	0.99%	
November 13	280,599	275,952	556,551	0.98%	
November 14	282,056	278,144	560,200	0.66%	
November 15	283,341	280,349	563,690	0.62%	
November 16	285,275	283,503	568,778	0.90%	
November 17	287,022	287,050	574,072	0.93%	
November 18	288,869	290,513	579,382	0.92%	
November 19	290,890	293,960	584,850	0.94%	
November 20	292,825	297,997	590,822	1.02%	
November 21	294,765	301,449	596,214	0.91%	
November 22	296,547	305,573	602,120	0.99%	
November 23	298,275	308,726	607,001	0.81%	
November 24	300,191	313,075	613,266	1.03%	
November 25	302,522	317,677	620,199	1.13%	
November 26	305,080	323,295	628,375	1.32%	
November 27	307,181	327,257	634,438	0.96%	
November 28	309,475	331,686	641,161	1.06%	
November 29	311,979	336,001	647,980	1.06%	
November 30	314,548	340,717	655,265	1.12%	
December 1	317,746	346,492	664,238	1.37%	
December 2	321,053	353,040	674,093	1.48%	
December 3	324,650	360,714	685,364	1.67%	
December 4	327,879	368,246	696,125	1.57%	
December 5	331,006	374,821	705,827	1.39%	
December 6	333,771	379,358	713,129	1.03%	
December 7	337,232	385,232	722,464	1.31%	
December 8	337,232	385,232	733,064	1.47%	
December 9	344,344	398,898	743,242	1.39%	
December 10	347,691	406,146	753,837	1.43%	
December 11	351,764	413,292	764,966	1.48%	
December 12	355,052	420,108	775,160	1.33%	
December 13	358,081	426,123	784,204	1.17%	
December 14	362,227	432,330	794,557	1.32%	
December 15	365,758	438,797	804,555	1.26%	
December 16	369,385	446,084	815,469	1.36%	
December 17	373,884	454,282	828,166	1.56%	
December 18	377,229	460,856	838,085	1.20%	
December 19	380,473	467,569	848,042	1.19%	
December 20	383,311	473,238	857,049	1.06%	
December 21	387,267	479,498	866,765	1.13%	
December 22	391,640	487,062	878,702	1.38%	
December 23	396,302	494,968	891,270	1.43%	
December 24	400,473	503,243	903,716	1.40%	
December 25	404,422	510,100	914,522	1.20%	
December 26	407,264	514,881	922,145	0.83%	
December 27	410,787	521,765	932,552	1.13%	
December 28	415,357	528,633	943,990	1.23%	
December 29	420,067	537,345	957,412	1.42%	
December 30	426,060	548,154	974,214	1.75%	
December 31	431,353	559,358	990,711	1.69%	
January 1	436,581	569,204	1,005,785	1.52%	
January 2	439,921	577,232	1,017,153	1.13%	
January 3	443,647	584,715	1,028,362	1.10%	
January 4	448,510	592,518	1,041,028	1.23%	
January 5	444,133	603,543	1,057,676	1.60%	
January 6	460,520	614,792	1,075,312	1.67%	
January 7	466,804	627,340	1,094,144	1.75%	
January 8	472,848	638,239	1,111,087	1.75%	
January 9	478,167	648,275	1,126,442	1.38%	
January 10	483,457	656,699	1,140,156	1.22%	
January 11	489,451	665,919	1,155,370	1.33%	
January 12	495,273	674,674	1,169,947	1.26%	
January 13	500,632	682,976	1,183,608	1.17%	
Date	New York City	Rest of state	Total cases	% change	Ref.

=== Demographics ===
Following a USA Today article in early April suggesting the states could release demographic breakdowns of victims, New York published information on the age of those who had died of COVID-19. Nearly two-thirds of the dead were over 60 years old. It also included a breakdown by county, information that in some cases differed with that released by the individual county health departments. Later data showed that 61 percent of the dead were men, that 86 percent had underlying health conditions such as hypertension and diabetes that are known to increase the possibility that COVID-19 will be fatal, and that African American and Latino patients in the state outside of New York City accounted for a greater share of the deaths from the disease than their share of the overall population (data from New York City was not available at the time). Demographics of COVID-19 fatalities continue to be updated on the state's COVID-19 tracker website.

=== Graphs ===
Note: As the New York State Department of Health is not reporting data in compliance with CDC recommendations, the below charts use only data validated by Johns Hopkins University.

==== Daily cases ====
View source data.

==== Daily deaths ====
View source data.

Note: Per NYDOH, the spike for June 30 in the above chart is due to a comprehensive accounting of current and retrospective data, provided by nursing homes and adult care facilities. These data capture COVID-19 confirmed and COVID-19 presumed deaths within these facilities. These data do not reflect COVID-19 confirmed or COVID-19 presumed positive deaths that occurred outside of the facility. This number includes retrospective data from reporting that dates back to March 1, 2020.

==== Total cases ====
View source data.

==== Total deaths ====
View source data.

== See also ==
- Timeline of the COVID-19 pandemic in the United States
- COVID-19 pandemic in New York City - for impact in New York City
- COVID-19 pandemic in the United States – for impact on the country
- COVID-19 pandemic in North America – for impact on the continent
- COVID-19 pandemic – for impact on other countries
- New York COVID-19 nursing home scandal
