= COVID-19 pandemic in New York =

COVID-19 pandemic in New York may refer to:

- COVID-19 pandemic in New York (state), cases in the entire state
- COVID-19 pandemic in New York City, cases in New York City alone
