= Douglas A. Kellner =

Douglas A. Kellner (born 1952) is Co-Chair of the New York State Board of Elections. He was appointed in December 2005. Prior to that, he served as the Democratic commissioner from Manhattan on the New York City Board of Elections from 1993 to 2005.

Kellner was one of the first proponents of a voter verifiable paper audit trail for electronic voting machines. He was the leader of the opposition to New York City’s contract to purchase unverifiable direct recording electronic voting machines.

Kellner is a partner in the law firm of Kellner Herlihy Getty & Friedman, LLP. He specializes in the area of Real Estate Litigation and represents a large number of tenants groups, cooperatives, and some non-profit institutional landlords. Kellner received considerable attention in 1986 when he revived New York's Bawdy House Law, first enacted in 1840, and used it as a device where neighbors could seek to evict drug dealers. His use of this overlooked law for that purpose was quickly copied by district attorneys and housing authorities throughout the country.

On April 27, 2020, Kellner canceled the New York State presidential primary, citing concerns due to the coronavirus pandemic. A week later, federal judge Analisa Torres ruled the cancellation by the Board of Elections unconstitutional.
