= Milton Handler =

American lawyer

- Born: 1903; Bronx, New York, United States
- Died: November 10, 1998 (aged 94–95)
- Education: Columbia College, Columbia Law School
- Occupations: lawyer, professor of law
- Known for: taught at Columbia University Law School for 45 years
- Notable work: President Franklin D. Roosevelt's chief adviser on antitrust matters
- Spouses: Marion Winter Kahn (m. 1931; death 1953), Miriam Adler (m. 1955; death 1997)
- Children: 1 daughter Carole E. Handler

Milton C. Handler (1903 – November 10, 1998) was an American lawyer and professor of law. He was considered a "leading antitrust expert and drafter of some of the nation's best-known laws."

== Early life and education ==
Born in the Bronx in 1903, he was the youngest of seven children. After his father died when he was 2, they moved to Brooklyn. He graduated from Columbia College in 1923, originally thinking of teaching literature. He graduated from Columbia Law School in 1926 with top honors. He clerked for Justice Harlan Fiske Stone of the Supreme Court for one year.

== Career ==
Handler taught at Columbia University Law School for 45 years. His tenure began after he was invited to teach at summer session. When he left, he had the longest tenure in the history of the school.

He was President Franklin D. Roosevelt's chief adviser on antitrust matters, served as the first general counsel to the National Labor Relations Board. He helped draft several landmark statutes such as the Federal Food, Drug and Cosmetic Act of 1938, the National Labor Relations Act and the G.I. Bill of Rights. He also played a role in the government rescuing victims of the Holocaust.

In the 1950s, he became a partner in the New York law firm, Kaye, Scholer, Fierman, Hays & Handler where he represented corporations such as Xerox, PepsiCo, the American Tobacco Company and Texaco.

== Personal life ==
Handler married Marion Winter Kahn in 1931, who died in 1953. He married second wife Miriam Adler in 1955 (she predeceased him in 1997). He is survived by his daughter Carole E. Handler and two granddaughters, Alisa Marion Schoenbach and Ilana Abigail Schoenbach.

== See also ==
- List of law clerks for the ninth seat of the Supreme Court of the United States
