= Benjamin Kaye =

American male dramatists and playwright

- Born: Benjamin Mark Kaye; 1884; New York City, United States
- Died: March 24, 1970 (aged 85–86); New York City, United States
- Other name: Benjamin M. Kaye
- Education: Columbia University (BA, LLB)
- Occupations: lawyer, playwright
- Employer: Kaye Scholer
- Known for: co-founding Kaye Scholer

Benjamin Mark Kaye (1884 – March 25, 1970) was an American lawyer known for co-founding the international law firm Kaye Scholer. He was also a playwright who wrote and translated several Broadway plays.

== Biography ==
Kaye was born in 1884 in New York City. He graduated from Columbia College in 1904 and Columbia Law School in 1907. After being admitted to the bar in 1907, Kaye received legal training at the office of the noted trial lawyer Max Steuer.

Kaye was trained a specialist in federal income taxation and became one of the first lawyers to try a federal income tax case under the Revenue Act of 1913.

In 1917, Kaye founded the law firm Kaye Scholer with Jacob Scholer. The law firm merged with Arnold & Porter in 2016.

Interested in theater since his youth, Kaye was also a prolific playwright who helped organize the Theatre Guild and served as the general counsel of the American National Theater and Academy. His writing credits included She Didn't Say No! (1926), starring Florence Moore and was adapted into the 1941 film She Couldn't Say No, The Curtain Rises (1933), starring Jean Arthur, and On Stage (1935), starring Osgood Perkins.

He also contributed to The Garrick Gaieties by Rodgers and Hart, and was credited by The New York Times for bringing the duo together.

In 1960, he received the Kelcey Allen Award for his contribution to American theater. He died on March 25, 1970, at his home in the Rockefeller Apartments.
