= She Couldn't Say No (1940 film) =

- Theatrical release poster
- Directed by: William Clemens
- Screenplay by: Earl Baldwin; Charles Grayson
- Based on: She Couldn't Say No; 1926 play by Benjamin M. Kaye
- Produced by: William Jacobs
- Starring: Roger Pryor; Eve Arden; Cliff Edwards; Clem Bevans; Vera Lewis; Irving Bacon
- Cinematography: Ted D. McCord
- Edited by: Harold McLernon
- Music by: Howard Jackson
- Production company: Warner Bros. Pictures
- Distributed by: Warner Bros. Pictures
- Release date: December 7, 1940
- Running time: 62 minutes
- Country: United States
- Language: English

She Couldn't Say No is a 1940 American comedy film directed by William Clemens and written by Earl Baldwin and Charles Grayson. The film stars Roger Pryor, Eve Arden, Cliff Edwards, Clem Bevans, Vera Lewis and Irving Bacon. It was released by Warner Bros. Pictures on December 7, 1940.

== Plot ==
Wally Turnbull is a partner in a law firm, Trumbull and Johnson, where his trusty secretary Alice Hinsdale is so much in love with Wally that she put aside her own ambitions of becoming an attorney.

Wally is offered a chance to represent a wealthy old man, Eli Potter, in a business transaction. It turns out Potter is being sued for breach of promise by a lady, Pansy Hawkins, who needs a good lawyer. After being shot at by Potter, Wally decides to become Patsy's lawyer instead. Not knowing Patsy has already become Wally's client, Alice pretends to be his partner Johnson and agrees to represent Potter. So angry is Wally that an irritated Alice goes through with the trial, opposing him in court. Potter's reconciliation with Pansy makes the outcome moot.

== Cast ==
- Roger Pryor as Wallace Turnbull
- Eve Arden as Alice Hinsdale
- Cliff Edwards as Banjo Page
- Clem Bevans as Eli Potter
- Vera Lewis as Pansy Hawkins
- Irving Bacon as Abner
- Spencer Charters as Hank Woodcock
- Ferris Taylor as Judge Jenkins
- Chester Clute as Ezra Pine
- George Irving as Henry Rockwell
- Zeffie Tilbury as Ma Hawkins
- George Guhl as Barber
- Frank Mayo as Town Marshal
