= Kaye Scholer =

American law firm

- Headquarters: 250 West 55th Street, New York, NY
- No. of offices: 9
- No. of attorneys: 450+
- Major practice areas: General practice
- Revenue: $370 million (2015)
- Profit per equity partner: $1.38 million (2015)
- Date founded: 1917 (New York City)
- Founder: Benjamin Kaye; Jacob Scholer
- Company type: Limited liability partnership
- Dissolved: 2017
- Website: www.arnoldporter.com

Kaye Scholer was an American law firm founded in 1917 by Benjamin Kaye and Jacob Scholer. The firm had more than 450 attorneys in nine offices located in the cities of Chicago, Frankfurt, London, Los Angeles, New York City (headquarters), Shanghai, Palo Alto, Washington, D.C., and West Palm Beach.

In late 2016, Kaye Scholer voted to merge with Washington D.C.–based law firm Arnold & Porter to create a $1 billion+ sized multinational firm with a large offering both in the US and internationally. The merger was effected on January 1, 2017, as Arnold & Porter Kaye Scholer LLP, later modified to operating as Arnold & Porter, in February 2018.

== History ==
The firm was founded in 1917 in New York by Benjamin Kaye and Jacob Scholer. Scholer was a graduate of New York Law School. Kaye was a graduate of Columbia Law School and an eminent banking lawyer who was among the first lawyers to bring a federal income tax case to trial under the 1913 income tax law. Kaye was also a noted playwright who wrote plays between tax cases. The firm was known as Kaye, Scholer, Fierman, Hays and Handler for many years.

In 1958 the firm moved into brand new offices at 425 Park Avenue, between 55th and 56th Streets. This becomes the firm's New York headquarters for the next 55 years, making it one of the longest business tenants at one locale in the city's history. In fall 2014, the firm left 425 Park Avenue and moved its New York headquarters to 250 West 55th Street.

Kaye Scholer launched an office in Washington, D.C. in 1980.

Charges brought by the Office of Thrift Supervision against the firm in 1992 related to its representation of Charles Keating and his bank, Lincoln Savings and Loan, generated one of the most prominent legal ethics controversies of the decade.

Kaye Scholer opened an office in West Palm Beach in 1997, where it focuses on real estate and estate planning law.

Former US Senator Abraham Ribicoff joined Kaye Scholer as senior counsel in 1981. Ribicoff had previously sponsored the bill that opened up trade between the US and China. As a result of his influence, Kaye Scholer was able to further expand into the Asian market, becoming the first New York–based firm to open a Shanghai office in 1998.

In 2001, Kaye Scholer opened offices in London and Chicago; the firm's Frankfurt office opened soon after, in 2002. In 2010, the firm opened its ninth office in Palo Alto, offering a full range of legal services to technology companies and private investment firms in Silicon Valley and Northern California.

Following the merger of London-based Clifford Chance and legacy firm Rogers & Wells, Kaye Scholer benefited from a series of key lateral partners in intellectual property and bankruptcy.

In November 2016, Kaye Scholer announced that it would be merging with Washington, D.C.–based firm Arnold & Porter LLP to form Arnold & Porter Kaye Scholer LLP, with approximately 1000 attorneys across nine domestic and four international offices. The merger took effect on January 1, 2017. In February 2018, The National Law Journal reported that the newly combined "firm has quietly reversed its post-merger branding efforts" and "scrubbed nearly all mention of ”Kaye Scholer” from its public image, changing its brand name, email addresses and web domain", while retaining the legal entity name in full.

== Recognition ==
Kaye Scholer was internationally known for being a leading litigation firm. Its particular areas of litigation strength include antitrust, intellectual property, and products liability. In 2008, Kaye Scholer was named Product Liability Firm of the Year by Chambers and Partners. In 2005, 2006 and 2007, The National Law Journal named Kaye Scholer to its list of top 10 elite litigation defense firms, making Kaye Scholer the only law firm to appear on this list for the three years it had run. In 2006, The American Lawyer magazine selected Kaye Scholer as the products liability litigation firm of the year. In 2013, Law360 selected Kaye Scholer's product liability practice as one of its Practice Groups of the Year. Kaye Scholer was one of only five firms singled out for product liability by the publication.

Kaye Scholer also had transactional practice, including those in aviation, bankruptcy, finance, mergers and acquisitions, private equity, and real estate.

In the life sciences arena, Kaye Scholer was recognized in 2010 as "one of the most well regarded firms" for life sciences by The International Who's Who of Life Sciences Lawyers 2010. On September 10, 2009, at an awards ceremony in Basel, Switzerland, capping Novartis AG's Global Legal Meeting, Kaye Scholer received the company's first-ever Preferred Provider Award for Excellence.

Kaye Scholer was one of the nation's most profitable large law firms, according to American Lawyer magazine. Kaye Scholer maintains a reputation for being a collegial firm, something of a rarity in law firms of its size and economic success.

== Noted alumni ==
Among Kaye Scholer's alumni are:

- Denise Cote, Senior United States district judge of the United States District Court for the Southern District of New York
- Analisa Torres, United States district judge of the United States District Court for the Southern District of New York
- Abraham Ribicoff, former United States House of Representatives and Senator for Connecticut and 80th governor of Connecticut
- Kenneth Feinberg, Special Master of the U.S. Government's September 11th Victim Compensation Fund
- Milton Handler, a Columbia Law professor and antitrust expert who drafted laws that include the first Food and Drug Act, the National Labor Relations Act, and the GI Bill of Rights.
