= Analisa Torres =

American judge (born 1959)

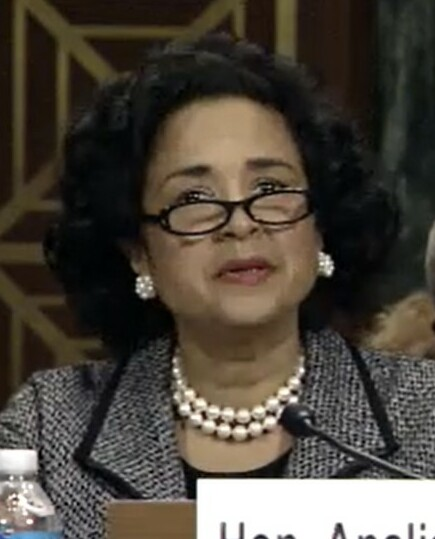
- Torres in 2013

Judge of the United States District Court for the Southern District of New York
- Incumbent
- Assumed office April 23, 2013
- Appointed by: Barack Obama
- Preceded by: Naomi Reice Buchwald

Personal details
- Born: 1959 (age 66–67) New York City, New York, U.S.
- Domestic partner: Constantino Ramón Argimon
- Education: Harvard University (A.B.); Columbia University (J.D.)

Analisa Nadine Torres (born 1959) is a United States district judge of the United States District Court for the Southern District of New York.

== Early life and education ==
Analisa Torres's father, Frank Torres, served for many years as a New York Supreme Court justice in the Bronx, and as a Democratic member of the New York State Assembly; and her grandfather Felipe N. Torres (d. 1994) served as a Family Court judge and was also an assemblyman.

Torres received her Artium Baccalaureus degree, magna cum laude, in 1981 from Harvard College and her Juris Doctor in 1984 from Columbia Law School.

== Career ==
Torres spent the early portion of her legal career as a real estate associate at three New York City law firms (Kaye Scholer from 1984 to 1985, Coudert Brothers from 1985 to 1987, and Patterson, Belknap, Webb & Tyler from 1988 to 1992). From 1992 to 1999, she clerked for Justice Elliot Wilk of the New York Supreme Court; she served as a commissioner of the New York City Planning Commission from 1993 to 1995. From 2000 to 2002, Torres was a judge of the New York City Criminal Court. From 2003 to 2004, she was a judge on the New York City Civil Court. She served as an acting justice of the New York Supreme Court in the Bronx from 2004 to 2009, and became an elected justice of that court in 2010, handling criminal felony cases, serving until 2013.

=== Federal judicial service ===
On November 14, 2012, President Barack Obama nominated Analisa Torres to serve as a United States district judge for the United States District Court in the Southern District of New York, to the seat vacated by Judge Naomi Reice Buchwald, who assumed senior status on March 21, 2012. On January 2, 2013, Torres's nomination was returned to the President, due to the sine die adjournment of the Senate. On January 3, 2013, she was renominated to the same office. Her nomination was reported by the Senate Judiciary Committee on February 14, 2013, by voice vote. The Senate confirmed Torres's nomination on April 18, 2013, by voice vote. She received her commission on April 23, 2013.

== Personal life ==
Torres had been married since 1983 to Constantino Ramón Argimon, the son of Venezuelans living in Caracas.

== See also ==
- List of African American federal judges
- List of African American jurists
- List of Hispanic and Latino American jurists

Legal offices
Preceded by Naomi Reice Buchwald	Judge of the United States District Court for the Southern District of New York; 2013–present	Incumbent
