= List of United States federal courthouses in New York =

Following is a list of current and former courthouses of the United States federal court system located in New York. Each entry indicates the name of the building along with an image, if available, its location and the jurisdiction it covers, the dates during which it was used for each such jurisdiction, and, if applicable the person for whom it was named, and the date of renaming. Dates of use will not necessarily correspond with the dates of construction or demolition of a building, as pre-existing structures may be adapted or court use, and former court buildings may later be put to other uses. Also, the official name of the building may be changed at some point after its use as a federal court building has been initiated.

== Courthouses ==
Courthouse	City	Image	Street address	Jurisdiction	Dates of use	Named for
U.S. Custom House & Post Office†	Albany		Broadway and State St.	N.D.N.Y.	1884–1935; Now part of SUNY State University Plaza.	n/a
James T. Foley U.S. Courthouse	Albany		445 Broadway	N.D.N.Y.	1933–present	U.S. District Judge James T. Foley
Old Post Office and Courthouse†	Auburn		157 Genesee Street	N.D.N.Y.	1888–c. 1980; Now owned by Cayuga County.	n/a
U.S. Post Office & Court House	Binghamton			N.D.N.Y.	1891–1935; Razed in 1942.	n/a
Federal Building and U.S. Courthouse	Binghamton		15 Henry Street	N.D.N.Y.	1935–present	n/a
Conrad B. Duberstein U.S. Bankruptcy Courthouse†	Brooklyn		271 Cadman Plaza East	E.D.N.Y.	1892–present Still in use as a bankruptcy courthouse. Also houses a post office on lower levels.	Bankruptcy judge Conrad B. Duberstein (2009)
Emanuel Celler Federal Building	Brooklyn		225 Cadman Plaza East	E.D.N.Y.	1963–present	U.S. Representative Emanuel Celler (1972)
Theodore Roosevelt U.S. Courthouse	Brooklyn		225 Cadman Plaza East	E.D.N.Y.	2006–present	President Theodore Roosevelt (2008)
U.S. Custom House	Buffalo		Washington & Seneca Streets	N.D.N.Y. W.D.N.Y.	1856–1903; Razed in 1965.	n/a
U.S. Post Office†	Buffalo		121 Ellicott Street	W.D.N.Y.	1901–1936; Now owned by Erie Community College.	n/a
Michael J. Dillon Memorial U.S. Courthouse	Buffalo		68 Court Street	W.D.N.Y.	1936–2011	Murdered IRS agent Michael J. Dillon (1986)
Robert H. Jackson United States Courthouse	Buffalo		Niagara Square	W.D.N.Y.	2011–present Upon completion, the building was the most expensive government building in the history of Western New York	Robert H. Jackson United States Attorney General and Associate Justice of the United States Supreme Court
Ontario County Court House (space leased by the U.S. gov't)	Canandaigua		27 North Main Street	N.D.N.Y. W.D.N.Y.	1860–c. 1912; Still in use as the Ontario County Courthouse.	n/a
U.S. Post Office†	Canandaigua		28 North Main Street	W.D.N.Y.	1912–? Now part of the Canandaigua YMCA.	n/a
U.S. Post Office & Court House	Elmira		200 East Church Street	W.D.N.Y.	1903–? Now owned by the city.	n/a
U.S. Courthouse	Fort Drum		Lewis Avenue and First Street East	N.D.N.Y.		n/a
Alfonse M. D'Amato U.S. Courthouse	Central Islip		100 Federal Plaza	E.D.N.Y.	2002–present	U.S. Senator Al D'Amato
U.S. Post Office	Jamestown		West 3rd and Washington Streets	W.D.N.Y.	1904–1960; Razed in May, 1963.	n/a
U.S. Post Office	Jamestown		300 East 3rd Street	W.D.N.Y.	1960–? Now an office building partially leased by the Post Office.	n/a
U.S. Post Office†	Lockport		1 East Avenue	W.D.N.Y.	1904–1916; Still in use as a post office.	n/a
City Hall Post Office and Courthouse	Manhattan		Broadway at Park Row	S.D.N.Y. 2d Cir.	1875–1939; Construction began 1869; completed in 1880; demolished in 1939.	n/a
Thurgood Marshall U.S. Courthouse†	Manhattan		40 Centre Street (in Foley Square)	S.D.N.Y., 2d Cir.	1936–present	Associate Justice Thurgood Marshall (2001)
James L. Watson Court of International Trade Building	Manhattan		1 Federal Plaza (in Foley Square)	C.I.T.	1967–present	Customs Court judge James L. Watson
Daniel Patrick Moynihan U.S. Courthouse	Manhattan		500 Pearl Street (in Foley Square)	S.D.N.Y.	1994–present	U.S. Senator Daniel Patrick Moynihan (2000)
U.S. Post Office & Court House	Rochester		30 Church Street	N.D.N.Y. W.D.N.Y.	1891–1972; Now Rochester City Hall.	n/a
Kenneth B. Keating Federal Building	Rochester		100 State Street	W.D.N.Y.	1973–present	U.S. Sen. Kenneth Keating
U.S. Court House & Post Office	Syracuse			N.D.N.Y.	1900–1928; Completed in 1889; razed in 1949.	n/a
Clinton Exchange	Syracuse		Clinton Square	N.D.N.Y.	1928–?	n/a
James M. Hanley Federal Building	Syracuse		100 South Clinton Street	N.D.N.Y.	1976–present	U.S. Rep. James M. Hanley
U.S. Court House & Post Office	Utica		258 Genesee Street	N.D.N.Y.	1882–1929	n/a
Alexander Pirnie Federal Building†	Utica		258 Genesee Street	N.D.N.Y.	1929–present	U.S. Rep. Alexander Pirnie (1984)
Charles L. Brieant, Jr. Federal Building and Courthouse	White Plains		300 Quarropas Street	S.D.N.Y.	1983–present	District Court judge Charles L. Brieant (2008)

== Key ==
^{†}	Listed on the National Register of Historic Places (NRHP)
^{††}	NRHP-listed and also designated as a National Historic Landmark
