= Thomas P. Griesa =

American judge (1930–2017)

Senior Judge of the United States District Court for the Southern District of New York
- In office March 13, 2000 – December 24, 2017

Chief Judge of the United States District Court for the Southern District of New York
- In office 1993–2000
- Preceded by: Charles L. Brieant
- Succeeded by: Michael Mukasey

Judge of the United States District Court for the Southern District of New York
- In office June 30, 1972 – March 13, 2000
- Appointed by: Richard Nixon
- Preceded by: Seat established by 84 Stat. 294
- Succeeded by: Laura Taylor Swain

Personal details
- Born: Thomas Poole Griesa; October 11, 1930 Kansas City, Missouri, U.S.
- Died: December 24, 2017 (aged 87) New York City, New York, U.S.
- Education: Harvard University (BA); Stanford University (LLB)

Thomas Poole Griesa (October 11, 1930 – December 24, 2017) was a United States district judge of the United States District Court for the Southern District of New York from 1972 to 2017 and its Chief Judge from 1993 to 2000.

== Education and career ==
Born on October 11, 1930, in Kansas City, Missouri, Griesa received a B.A. degree from Harvard University in 1952 and served in the United States Coast Guard from 1952 to 1954, thereafter receiving a Bachelor of Laws from Stanford Law School in 1958. He was an attorney with the Admiralty and Shipping Section of the United States Department of Justice from 1958 to 1960, and was then in private practice in New York City, New York from 1960 to 1972.

== Federal judicial service ==
Griesa was nominated by President Richard Nixon on June 15, 1972, to the United States District Court for the Southern District of New York, to a new seat authorized by 84 Stat. 294. He was confirmed by the United States Senate on June 28, 1972, and received his commission on June 30, 1972. He served as Chief Judge from 1993 to 2000. He assumed senior status on March 13, 2000. His service terminated on December 24, 2017, due to his death in New York City.

== Notable cases ==
=== Griffin Bell contempt holding ===
In 1978, Griesa issued an order holding United States Attorney General Griffin Bell in contempt of court for Bell's refusal to turn over FBI records about eighteen "informants" in the Socialist Workers Party. This was the first time that a U.S. Attorney General had been held in contempt for conduct during pretrial proceedings. Although Griesa declined a request to immediately jail Bell for contempt, he did indicate that if Bell failed to comply with the order within a one-week deadline, Griesa would "entertain a motion for more drastic sanctions". Bell indeed refused to comply, and was held in contempt, although this order was stayed pending appellate review. On appeal, the U.S. Court of Appeals for the Second Circuit held that "it was clearly erroneous for the district court to determine that the files are so central to the plaintiffs' case that contempt is the only appropriate sanction for the Government's failure to disclose them", and ordered Griesa to consider alternative sanctions.

=== Westway construction permit holding ===
In 1982, Griesa blocked the construction of Westway, a proposed six-lane highway on the West Side of Manhattan, ruling that the permit for the project's landfill was invalid because the U.S. Army Corps of Engineers had failed to comply with the requirements for an adequate statement on the environmental impact. Although his decision dismissed various other attacks that environmental groups were using to stop the project in a series of lawsuits, he left one critical issue and said that the road might harm striped bass. His order was unanimously affirmed by a three-judge panel of the U.S. Court of Appeals for the Second Circuit. In 1985, after the Army Corps of Engineers completed another environmental review, Griesa again faulted their methods and record keeping, voided their permit and continued his injunction against the construction of Westway. His decision was again upheld by the Court of Appeals for the Second Circuit. Westway was never built.

=== Faithless servant holding ===
Tyco had filed against its former CEO Dennis Kozlowski, asserting that the $500 million in compensation and benefits he received during his time of disloyalty (while he was committing grand larceny and other crimes), between 1997 and 2002, were forfeit under New York's "faithless servant" doctrine. Griesa concluded in 2010 that under the faithless servant doctrine, Kozlowski must forfeit all compensation and benefits he earned during his period of disloyalty.

=== Argentina's debt restructuring ===
In 2014, Griesa presided over the Argentine debt restructuring, on remand following the U.S. Supreme Court's decision to permit vulture funds, who in the period June 2001 to November 2003 (that is from half a year before the Argentine default on December 26, 2001) bought bonds, which are negotiable instruments and therefore, like bond owners all over the world, never drew any pay from the issuing country, to access potentially an array of bank records to locate financial assets overseas in seeking compensation.

Negotiable instruments like bonds are bought and sold like commodities at the price seller and buyer agree upon. Paul Singer's Cayman Islands-based hedge fund NML Capital Limited is the principal litigant in this dispute, having paid considerably more than US$90 million in the secondary market for bonds with a face value of US$832 million by 2014. With interest accrued, "NML's share of the bounty, according to government figures, is $832 million from assets it purchased for $48.7 million — representing a return of 1,608 percent." Through an official press release published on Friday afternoon, June 27, 2014, the Argentine government stated that Griesa attempted to "block the payment for bondholders," and committed an abuse of authority, after cancelling the deposit made on Thursday into a Bank of New York account. The text specified "the deposited amounts are fiduciary property of the holders" and it is the duty of the fiduciary agent to "hold them on behalf of the holders' benefit." Judge Griesa's ruling was upheld by the full United States Court of Appeals, and the United States Supreme Court found no reason to revise Griesa's ruling.

==== Controversy ====
The reliability of the Argentine claim ("We are not in default") can be judged by:

1. The definition of default in the original prospectus for Argentina's 2005 debt exchange:

“Notwithstanding the foregoing, Argentina's obligations to make payments of principal and interest on the New Securities shall not have been satisfied until such payments are received by registered holders of the New Securities."

2. A similar statement in the original prospectus for Argentina's 2010 debt exchange. 3. All the major rating agencies has declared Argentina to be in default:

- Argentina put into selective default by Standard & Poor's
- Moody's changes Argentina's outlook to negative as default will hasten economic decline
- Fitch downgrades Argentina to 'restricted default'
- China's Dagong Global Credit Rating Co. cuts Argentina to default
- The International Swaps and Derivatives Association (ISDA) declares Argentina in default, bonds extend losses.

According to the American economist and recipient of the Nobel Memorial Prize in Economic Sciences, Joseph Stiglitz, with Griesa's decision "America is throwing a bomb into the global economic system".

==== Mauricio Macri ====
Griesa saw the elevation of Mauricio Macri to the office of President of Argentina as a key development that, in his words, "changes everything" and may lead to a final resolution of the disputes arising from the default.

== See also ==
- List of United States federal judges by longevity of service

Legal offices
Preceded by Seat established by 84 Stat. 294	Judge of the United States District Court for the Southern District of New York; 1972–2000	Succeeded by Laura Taylor Swain
Preceded by Charles L. Brieant	Chief Judge of the United States District Court for the Southern District of New York; 1993–2000	Succeeded by Michael Mukasey
