= Robert H. Jackson United States Courthouse =

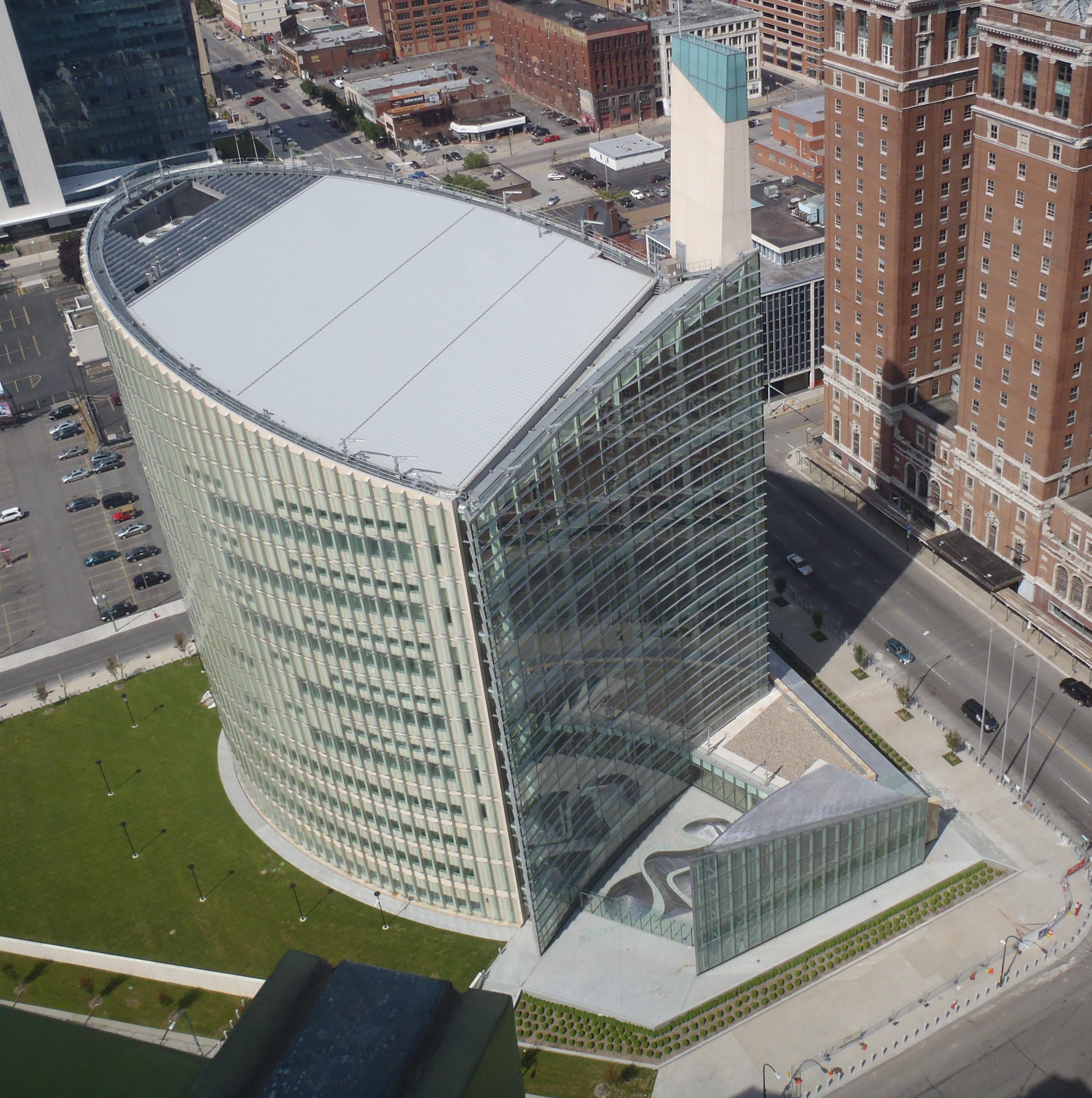
- Interactive map of the Robert H. Jackson United States Courthouse area

General information
- Status: Completed
- Type: Courthouse
- Architectural style: Contemporary modern
- Location: 2 Niagara Square, Buffalo, New York
- Coordinates: 42.8875°N 78.8784°W
- Construction started: October 2007
- Topped-out: 2010
- Completed: November 2011
- Inaugurated: May 4, 2012
- Cost: US$ 137 million

Height
- Tip: 255 ft (77.72 m)
- Roof: 200 ft (61 m)

Technical details
- Floor count: 10
- Floor area: 284,000 sq ft (26,400 m^{2})

Design and construction
- Architect: Kohn Pedersen Fox
- Developer: US General Services Administration (GSA)
- Structural engineer: Weidlinger Associates

The Robert H. Jackson United States Courthouse is a U.S. federal courthouse located in Buffalo, New York. The building occupies a full block of Delaware Avenue at Niagara Square, directly across from the Statler Towers and adjacent to Buffalo City Hall. The building features secure indoor parking for 54 vehicles, a glass entry pavilion that has all 4,536 words of the United States Constitution etched into the glass, and is topped off by a glass enclosure meant to resemble a glowing lantern when illuminated.

== Construction ==
The courthouse replaced a block of structures previously occupying the site, the most notable being the 1927 Erlanger theater building built by Statler Hotels.

Although expected to be opened by July 2010, construction of the building had been held back a year following concerns regarding the glass panel façade and a moisture problem. Federal officials opened the courthouse in November 2011. Upon completion, the building was the most expensive government building in the history of Western New York. The building replaced the Michael J. Dillon Courthouse as Buffalo's primary federal courthouse, and is currently home to the U.S. District Court, Court of Appeals, U.S. Probation, U.S. Marshals, U.S. Attorney and GSA. The building was designed and constructed to achieve a LEED-NC Gold certification through the U.S. Green Building Council.

The courthouse pavilion lobby contains monumental colored glass panels designed by Buffalo-area native Robert Mangold, a major figure in the geometric abstraction movement. The building won the 2011 Award for Design and Manufacturing Excellence from the Architectural Precast Association.

== Naming ==
In December 2011, Congressman Brian Higgins introduced a bill, naming the courthouse for Robert H. Jackson, the only Western New Yorker to serve as Supreme Court Justice. The bill H.R.3556 was voted on and approved on July 23, 2012, and became law on October 5, 2012. The Jackson Courthouse name on the building was unveiled at a ceremony on September 30, 2013.

== Gallery ==
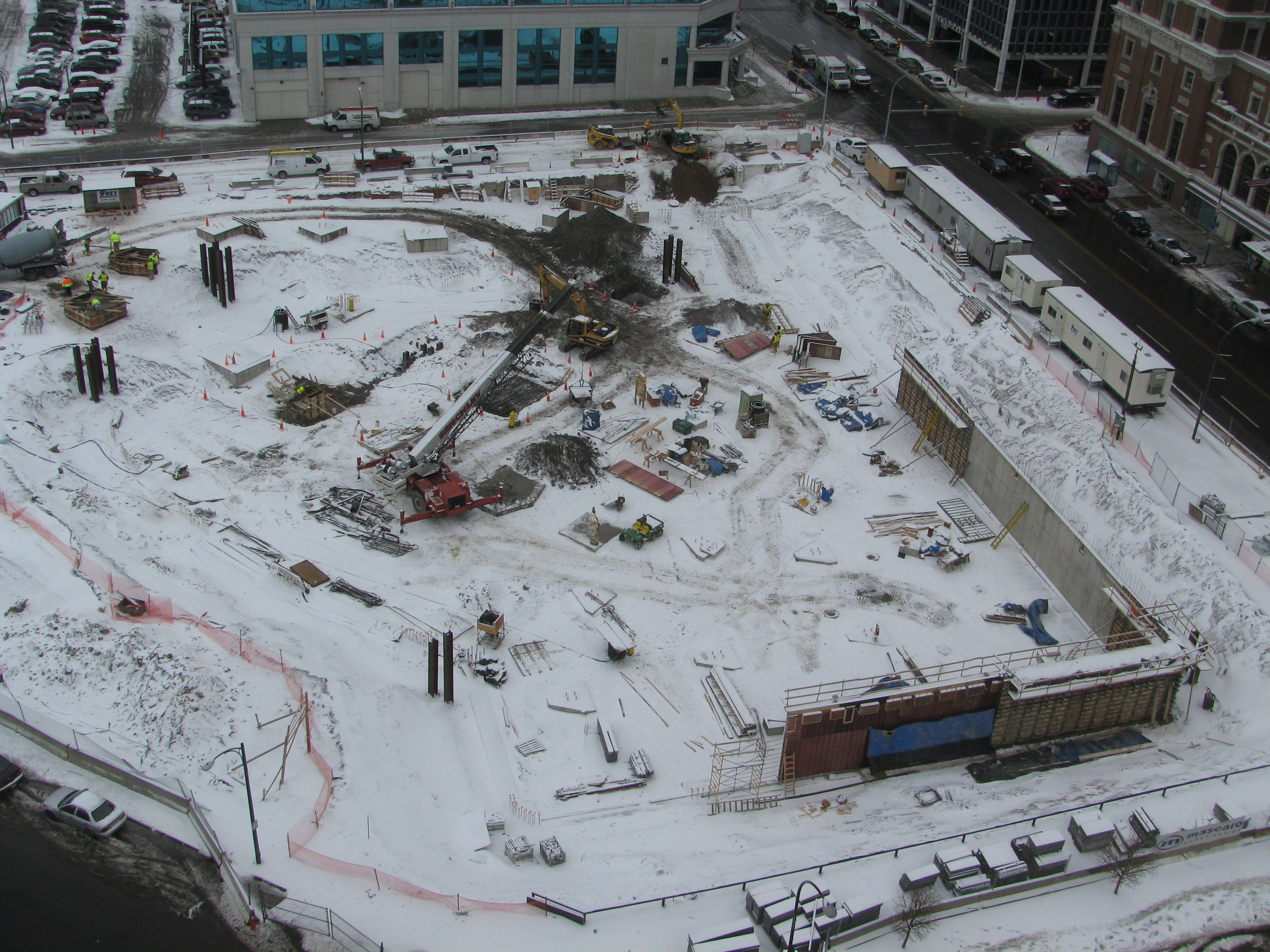
Clearing the site, 2008

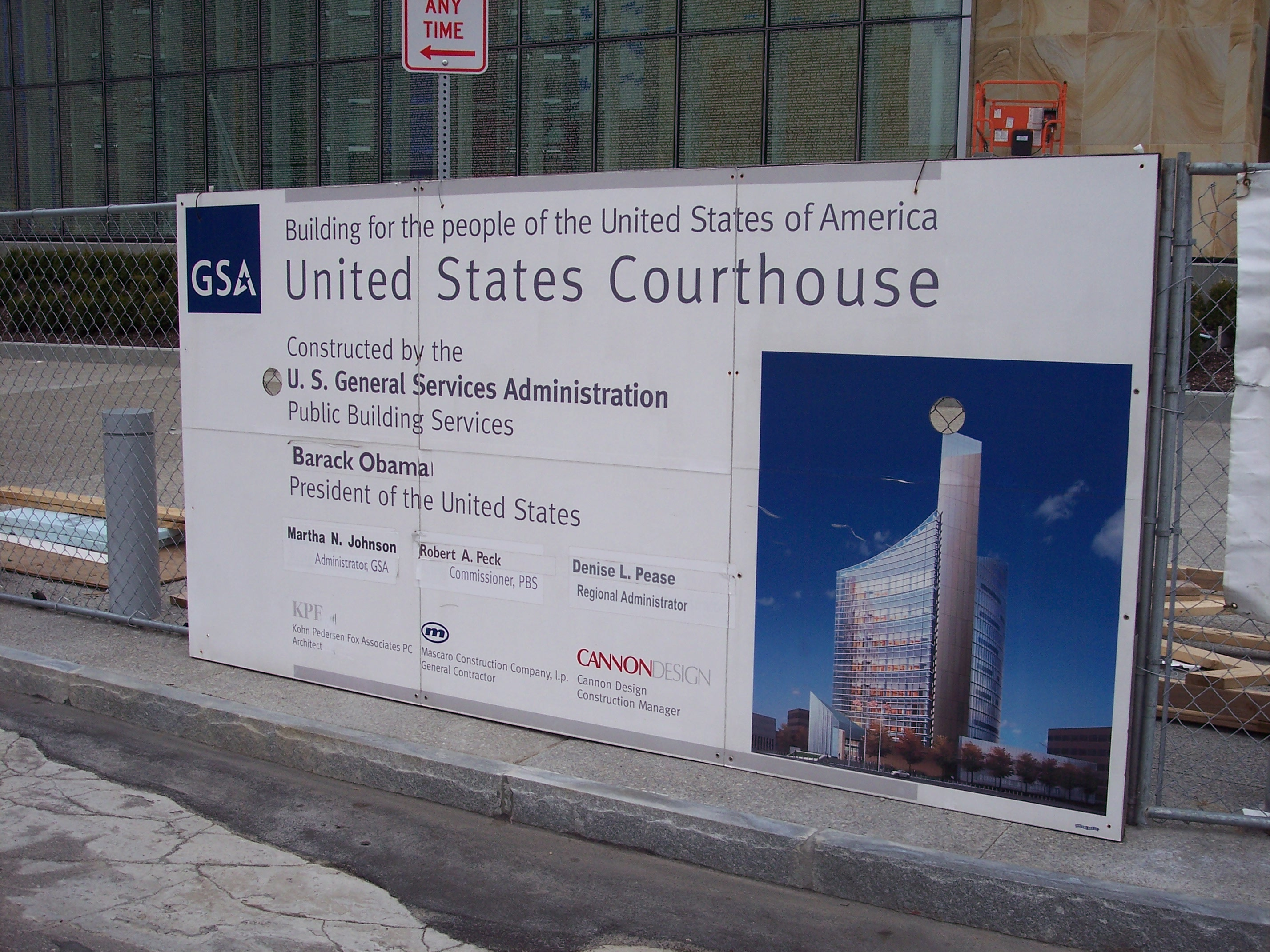
Project Information Sign

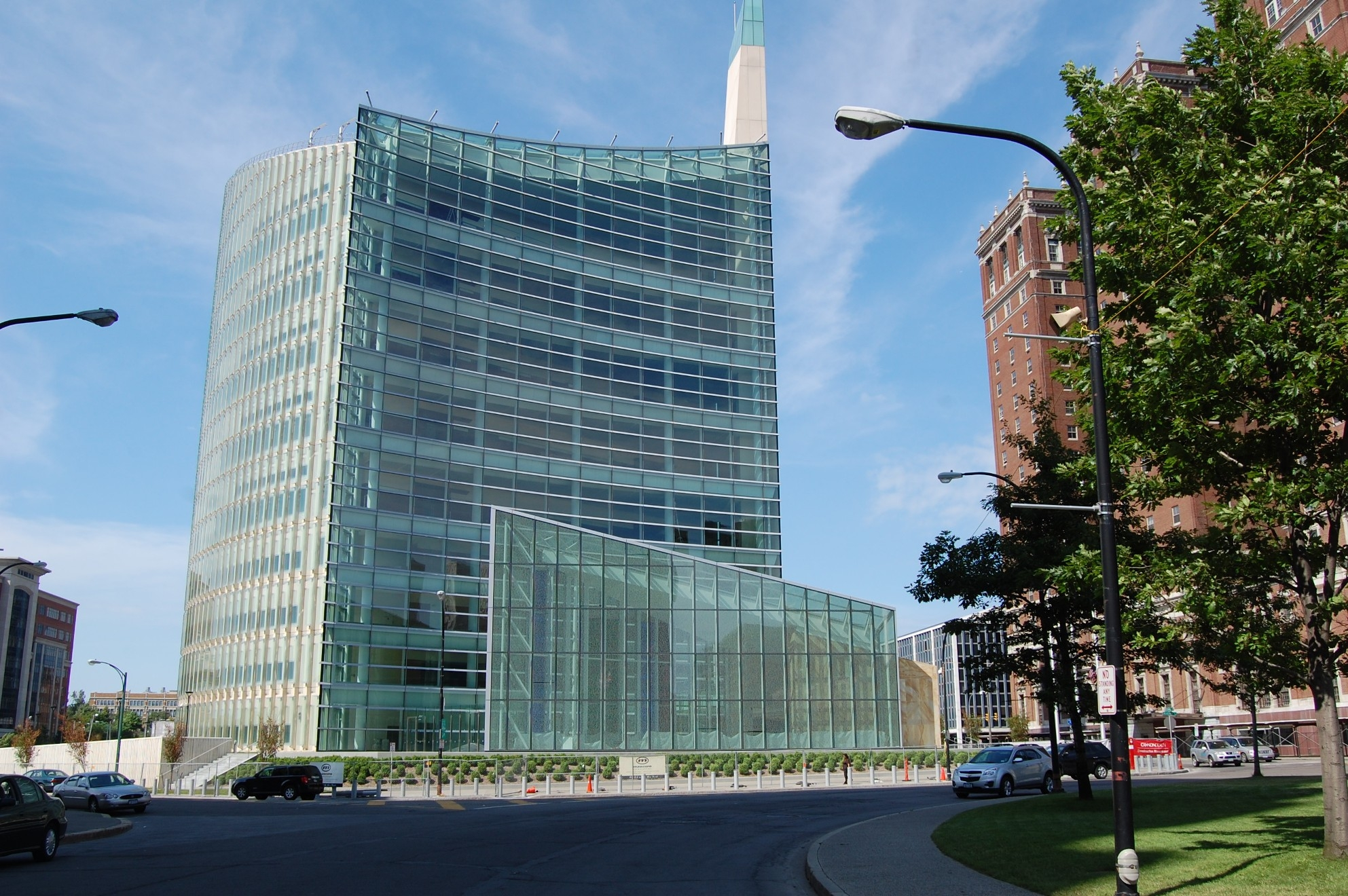
View from Niagara Square

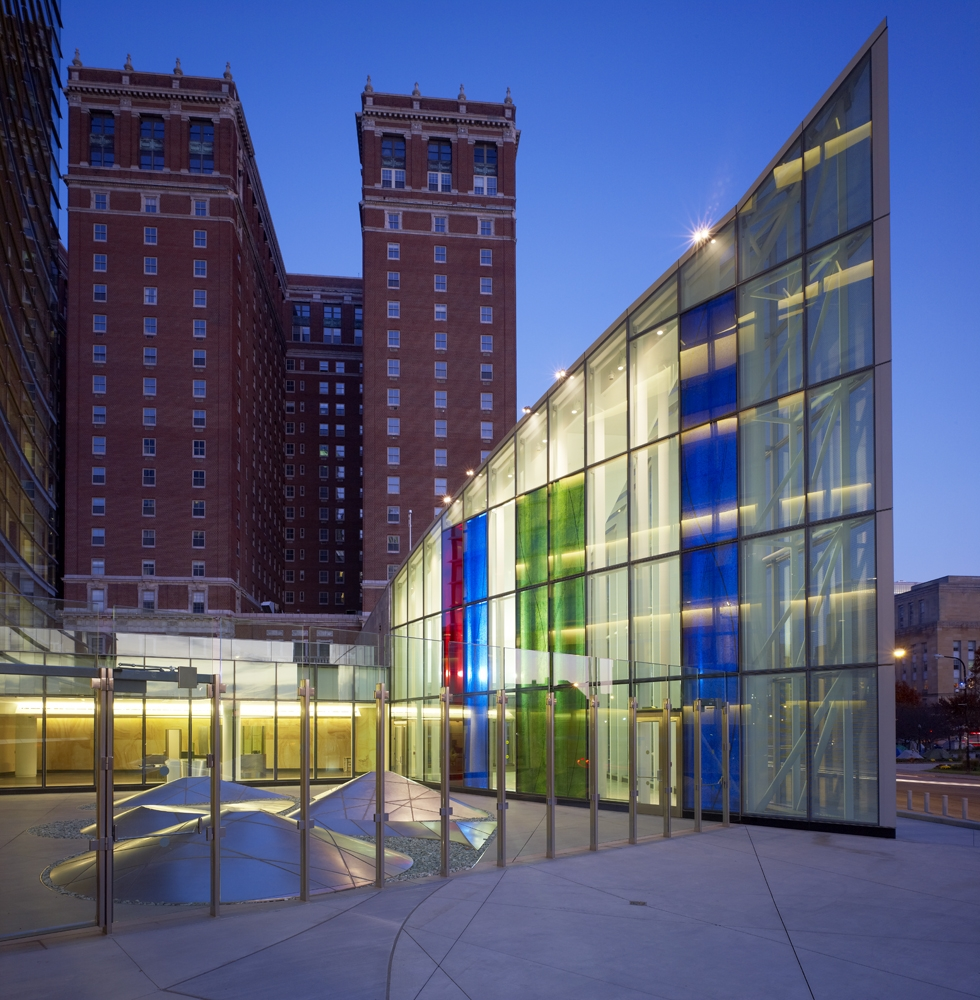
Glass pavilion in front of the building

== See also ==
- List of tallest buildings in Buffalo, New York
- List of United States federal courthouses in New York
