= John F. X. McGohey =

American judge

Senior Judge of the United States District Court for the Southern District of New York
- In office March 17, 1970 – July 7, 1972

Judge of the United States District Court for the Southern District of New York
- In office October 21, 1949 – March 17, 1970
- Appointed by: Harry S. Truman
- Preceded by: Seat established by 63 Stat. 493
- Succeeded by: Charles L. Brieant

Personal details
- Born: John F. X. McGohey; January 7, 1894 New York City, New York, U.S.
- Died: July 7, 1972 (aged 78)
- Education: Fordham University (BA); New York University (LLB)

John Francis Xavier McGohey (January 7, 1894 – July 7, 1972) was a United States district judge of the United States District Court for the Southern District of New York.

== Education and career ==
McGohey was born in New York City and graduated from Xavier High School in 1913. He then received a Bachelor of Arts degree from Fordham University in 1917 and was in the United States Army during World War I from 1918 to 1919. He received a Bachelor of Laws from New York University School of Law in 1923. He was an assistant counsel to the Hearst Publishing Company from 1923 to 1924, and was then counsel to the New York City Board of Transportation until 1932. He was an assistant state attorney general of New York from 1933 to 1943, and was Chief Assistant United States Attorney of the Southern District of New York from 1944 to 1949.

== Federal judicial service ==
McGohey received a recess appointment from President Harry S. Truman on October 21, 1949, to the United States District Court for the Southern District of New York, to a new seat authorized by 63 Stat. 493. He was nominated to the same position by President Truman on January 5, 1950. He was confirmed by the United States Senate on March 8, 1950, and received his commission on March 9, 1950. He assumed senior status on March 17, 1970. His service terminated on July 7, 1972, due to his death.

== Sources ==
Legal offices
Preceded by Seat established by 63 Stat. 493	Judge of the United States District Court for the Southern District of New York; 1949–1970	Succeeded by Charles L. Brieant
