= Buffalo City Court Building =

Brutalist-style courthouse in Buffalo, New York

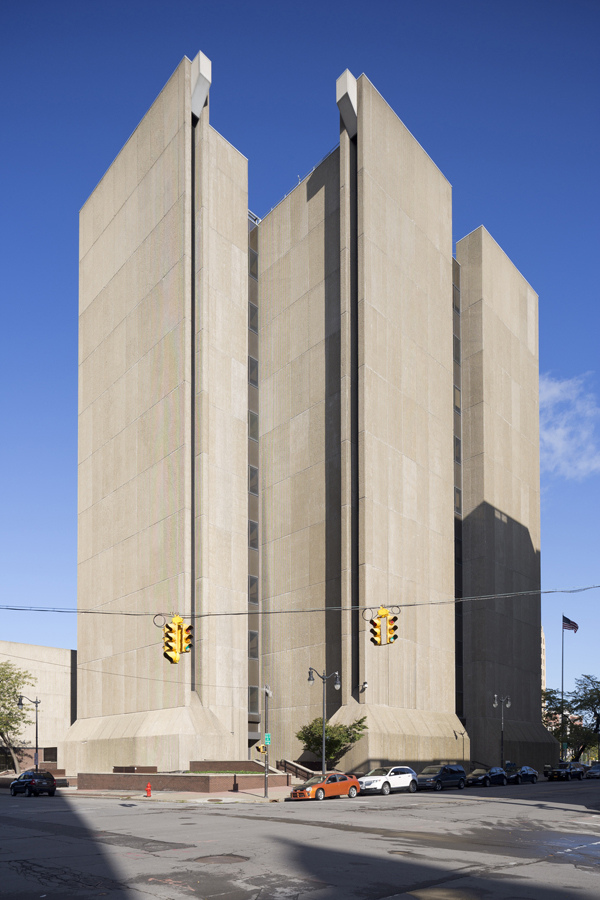
- Interactive map of the Buffalo City Court Building area

General information
- Architectural style: Brutalist
- Location: 50 Delaware Avenue, Buffalo, New York
- Coordinates: 42.885557°N 78.8792859°W
- Year built: 1971–1974

Technical details
- Floor count: 10

Design and construction
- Architects: Pfohl, Roberts and Biggie

The Buffalo City Court Building, named Frank A. Sedita City Court, for Buffalo mayor Frank A. Sedita, is a 10-story courthouse built in 1974 for the city of Buffalo, New York. It is in Niagara Square and adjacent to Buffalo City Hall.

== Design ==
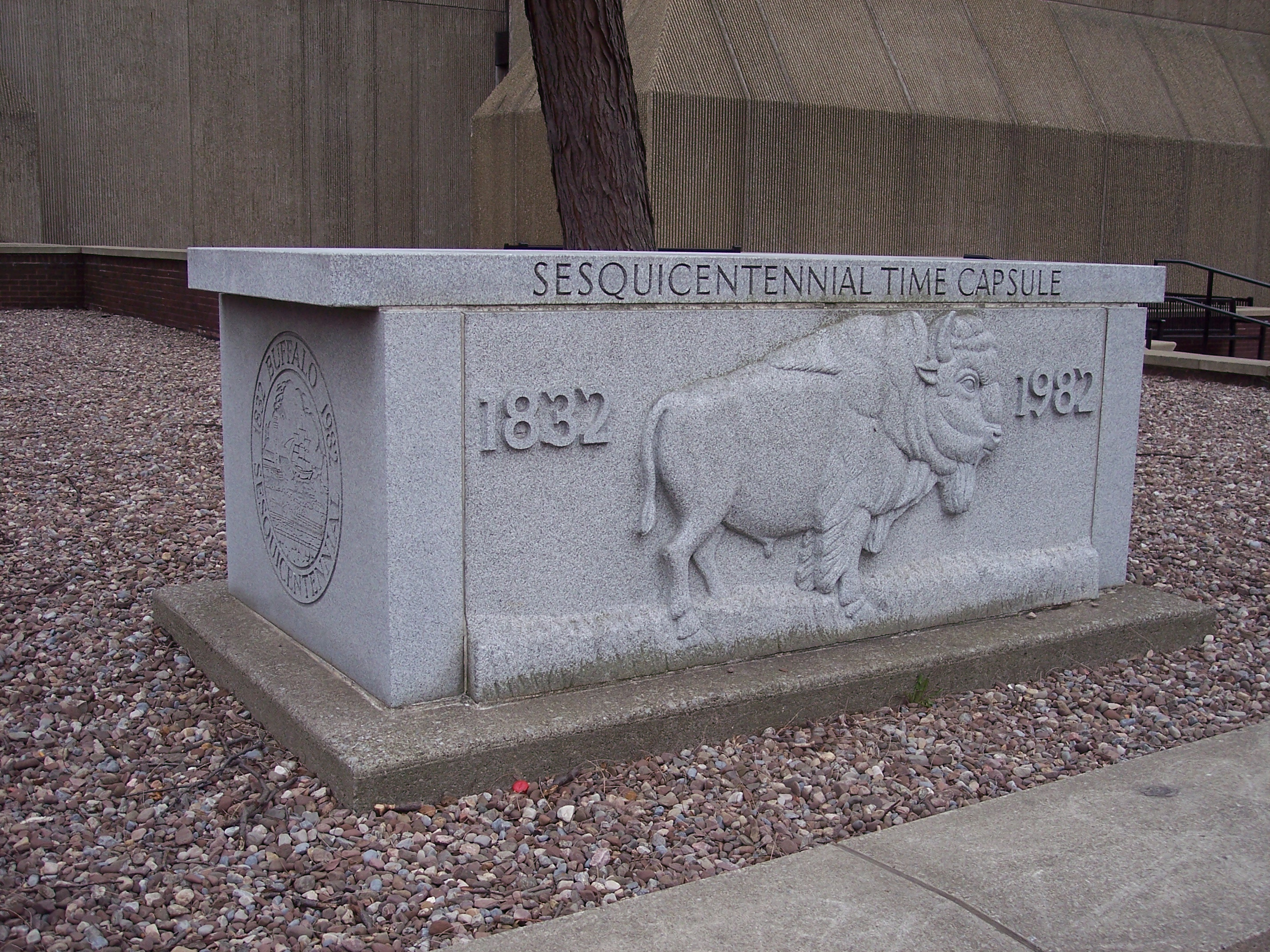
Time capsule outside the building

The structure is a classic example of brutalist architecture; its façade is dominated by large precast concrete panels with narrow windows. The design was conceived by Buffalo architectural firm Pfohl, Roberts and Biggie with limited windows to keep the courtrooms and judges' chambers free from outside distraction.

== Use ==
The building houses the 8th Judicial District, Buffalo Housing Court, Landlord/Tenant Court, Small Claims, Commercial Claims, Criminal Court, and several parts of New York State Supreme Court for the County of Erie.
