= Paul G. Gardephe =

American judge (born 1957)

Senior Judge of the United States District Court for the Southern District of New York
- Incumbent
- Assumed office August 9, 2023

Judge of the United States District Court for the Southern District of New York
- In office August 8, 2008 – August 9, 2023
- Appointed by: George W. Bush
- Preceded by: Charles L. Brieant
- Succeeded by: Jeannette Vargas

Personal details
- Born: 1957 (age 68–69) Fitchburg, Massachusetts, U.S.
- Education: University of Pennsylvania (BA, MA); Columbia University (JD)

Paul G. Gardephe (born 1957) is a senior United States district judge of the United States District Court for the Southern District of New York.

== Education and career ==
Born in Fitchburg, Massachusetts, Gardephe received a Bachelor of Arts degree from the University of Pennsylvania in 1979, a Master of Arts degree from the University of Pennsylvania in 1979, and a Juris Doctor from Columbia Law School in 1982. He was a law clerk to Judge Albert J. Engel Jr. of the United States Court of Appeals for the Sixth Circuit from 1982 to 1983. He was in private practice in New York City from 1983 to 1987. He was an Assistant United States Attorney of the U.S. Attorney's Office, Southern District of New York from 1987 to 1992, and served as Chief of the Appeals Unit, Criminal Division in that office from 1992 to 1995. From 1995 to 1996, Gardephe held the position of Senior litigation counsel, in the U.S. Attorney's Office, Southern District of New York.

He worked in the Time Inc. Law Department from 1996 to 2003, first as associate general counsel until 1998, then deputy general counsel for litigation from 1998 to 2000, then vice president and deputy general counsel from 2000 to 2003. He was also a consultant (special counsel) for the Office of the Inspector General of the United States Department of Justice from 1996 to 2000 and from 2001 to 2003. He returned to private practice from 2003 to 2008 as partner at Patterson Belknap, eventually heading the litigation department.

=== Federal judicial service ===
On April 29, 2008, Gardephe was nominated by President George W. Bush to a seat on the United States District Court for the Southern District of New York vacated by Charles L. Brieant. Gardephe was confirmed by the United States Senate on July 17, 2008, and received his commission on August 8, 2008. He assumed senior status on August 9, 2023.

== Notable cases ==
- In 2014, he presided over the trial of Mathew Martoma, a former portfolio manager for hedge fund SAC Capital Advisers, who was convicted by a unanimous jury verdict on 6 February 2014 for carrying out what federal prosecutors called the most profitable insider-trading scheme in U.S. history. On 8 September 2014, Gardephe sentenced Martoma to 9 years in prison, and ordered him to pay nearly $9.4 million. The judge acknowledged Martoma's community charitable work and history of helping others, and the filing of more than 100 letters to the court from supporters, but said he had gone for "one big score" and now had "to deal with the fallout." Martoma's lawyers said they would be appealing the February 6, 2014 conviction. In August 2017, a divided panel of the United States Court of Appeals for the Second Circuit upheld the conviction.
- "Months before his arrest in late 2012, Gilberto Valle, then a New York police officer, sat at his computer, hiding behind fictional online identities and exchanging messages about abducting, torturing, killing and eating women... There may not have been a more sensational trial in Manhattan in recent years than that of Mr. Valle, who came to be widely known as the cannibal cop. He was convicted of kidnapping conspiracy in March 2013 after prosecutors persuaded a jury that he was plotting actual abductions with others in one of the darkest corners of the Internet... In June, the judge, Paul G. Gardephe of Federal District Court, overturned Mr. Valle's conspiracy conviction, saying the evidence supported his contention that he was engaged in only "fantasy role-play." The government appealed, asking that the conviction be reinstated; but the Court ruled 2-1 on December 3, 2015 to uphold Judge Gardephe's ruling overturning the guilty verdict.

== Sources ==
Legal offices
| Preceded by Charles L. Brieant | Judge of the United States District Court for the Southern District of New York; 2008–2023 | Succeeded by Jeannette Vargas |
