= Charles L. Brieant Jr. Federal Building and Courthouse =

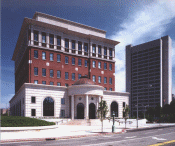
- Front of the courthouse
- Interactive map of the Charles L. Brieant Jr. Federal Building and Courthouse area

General information
- Location: 300 Quarropas Street, White Plains, New York
- Coordinates: 41°1′43.9″N 73°46′16.4″W
- Named for: Charles L. Brieant
- Opened: 1995

Design and construction
- Architect: Skidmore, Owings & Merrill

The Hon. Charles L. Brieant Jr. Federal Building and Courthouse is a United States federal office building and courthouse located at 300 Quarropas Street in downtown White Plains, New York, the seat of Westchester County. It is adjacent to the Richard J. Daronco Courthouse in which the New York State Supreme Court and Westchester County Court sit.

The United States District Court for the Southern District of New York hears cases in the courthouse. It is named for Charles L. Brieant Jr., a former federal judge at the White Plains courthouse who also practiced law and was involved in politics in Westchester County.

== See also ==
- List of United States federal courthouses in New York
