= Jeannette Vargas =

American judge (born 1973)

Jeannette A. Vargas

Judge of the United States District Court for the Southern District of New York
- Incumbent
- Assumed office November 6, 2024
- Appointed by: Joe Biden
- Preceded by: Paul G. Gardephe

Personal details
- Born: Jeannette Anne Vargas; 1973 (age 52–53) Flushing, Queens, New York, U.S.
- Education: Harvard College (BA); Yale University (JD)

Jeannette Anne Vargas (born 1973) is an American lawyer who has served as a United States district judge of the United States District Court for the Southern District of New York since 2024. She previously served as an assistant United States attorney in the U.S. Attorney's Office for the Southern District of New York from 2002 to 2024.

== Early life ==
Vargas earned a Bachelor of Arts, magna cum laude, from Harvard College in 1995 and a Juris Doctor from Yale Law School in 2000.

== Career ==
From 2000 to 2001, Vargas worked as an associate at Simpson Thacher & Bartlett in New York City. From 2001 to 2002, she was a law clerk for Judge Sonia Sotomayor of the United States Court of Appeals for the Second Circuit. From 2002 to 2024, she served as an assistant United States attorney in the U.S. Attorney's Office for the Southern District of New York. In that role, from 2010 to 2014, she served as chief of the Tax and Bankruptcy Unit, from 2014 to 2016, she was senior trial counsel and she served as deputy chief in the Civil Division from 2016 to 2024.

=== Federal judicial service ===
Vargas was recommended to the Biden administration by Senator Kirsten Gillibrand. On March 20, 2024, President Joe Biden announced his intent to nominate Vargas to serve as a United States district judge of the United States District Court for the Southern District of New York. On March 21, 2024, her nomination was sent to the Senate. President Biden nominated Vargas to the seat vacated by Judge Paul G. Gardephe, who assumed senior status on August 9, 2023. On April 17, 2024, a hearing on her nomination was held before the Senate Judiciary Committee. On May 9, 2024, her nomination was reported out of committee by an 11–10 party-line vote. On September 10, 2024, the United States Senate invoked cloture on her nomination by a 52–43 vote. Later that day, her nomination was confirmed by a 51–43 vote. She received her judicial commission on November 6, 2024.

== Notable rulings ==
=== DOGE ruling ===
In response to a February 2025 lawsuit filed by Attorney General Letitia James of New York, Vargas issued an injunction prohibiting DOGE from accessing Treasury systems.

On April 11, 2025 she decided in favor of the Trump administration. The New York Times wrote: "Judge Vargas acknowledged that her preliminary injunction had been ordered in part because of what the court identified as issues with the Treasury’s “hasty implementation and gaps in training” for the DOGE team members.

"However, 'based on existing record,' Judge Vargas wrote that the mitigation, training and vetting procedures that the government has detailed in its filings are adequate to satisfy her concerns."

=== Drake-Kendrick Lamar defamation case ===
In 2024, rappers Drake and Kendrick Lamar—who were both signed to the same record company, Universal Music Group (UMG)—exchanged aggressive diss tracks. In particular, Lamar's "Not Like Us" described Drake as a "certified pedophile." Drake sued UMG for defamation, alleging that Lamar's accusations were false and that UMG knew they were false, but boosted the visibility of Lamar's accusations to make money at Drake's expense. In October 2025, Judge Vargas granted UMG's motion to dismiss the lawsuit. She held that New York State defamation law disfavored legal liability for statements of opinion and would not allow Drake to sue UMG for publishing and amplifying Lamar’s opinion. She concluded that in context, Lamar's lyrics were opinions, even if they were worded similarly to factual assertions, as a reasonable listener would understand that rap battles are not "fact-checked verifiable content." For support, she noted that Drake had previously dared Lamar to accuse him in "Taylor Made Freestyle", and had also accused Lamar of domestic violence. She dismissed Drake's argument that some social media commenters thought Lamar was stating facts, because "[i]n a world in which billions of people are active online, support for almost any proposition, no matter how farfetched, fantastical or unreasonable, can be found with little effort."

== See also ==
- List of Hispanic and Latino American jurists

Legal offices
Preceded by Paul G. Gardephe	Judge of the United States District Court for the Southern District of New York; 2024–present	Incumbent
