= Charles L. Brieant =

American judge (1923–2008)

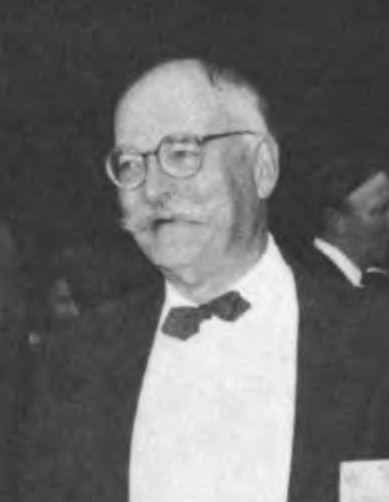

Senior Judge of the United States District Court for the Southern District of New York
- In office May 31, 2007 – July 20, 2008

Chief Judge of the United States District Court for the Southern District of New York
- In office 1986–1993
- Preceded by: Constance Baker Motley
- Succeeded by: Thomas P. Griesa

Judge of the United States District Court for the Southern District of New York
- In office July 29, 1971 – May 31, 2007
- Appointed by: Richard Nixon
- Preceded by: John F. X. McGohey
- Succeeded by: Paul G. Gardephe

Personal details
- Born: Charles LaMonte Brieant Jr. March 13, 1923 Ossining, New York, U.S.
- Died: July 20, 2008 (aged 85) New York City, New York, U.S.
- Education: Columbia University (BA, LLB)

Charles LaMonte Brieant Jr. (March 13, 1923 – July 20, 2008) was a United States district judge of the United States District Court for the Southern District of New York from 1971 to 2008 and its Chief Judge from 1986 to 1993.

== Education and career ==
Born March 13, 1923, in Ossining, New York, Brieant served in the United States Army Air Corps from 1943 to 1946. He received a Bachelor of Arts degree in 1947 from Columbia University and a Bachelor of Laws in 1949 from Columbia Law School. He was in private practice in White Plains, New York, from 1949 to 1971. He served as the Water Commissioner of Ossining from 1948 to 1951. He was the Town Justice of Ossining from 1952 to 1958. He was the Village Attorney for Briarcliff Manor, New York, from 1958 to 1959. He was a special assistant district attorney for Westchester County, New York, from 1958 to 1959. He was a Town Supervisor for Ossining from 1960 to 1963. He was an assistant counsel for the New York State Joint Legislative Committee on Fire Insurance in 1968. He was a member of the Westchester County Board of Legislators from 1970 to 1971.

== Federal judicial service ==
Brieant was nominated by President Richard Nixon on June 24, 1971, to a seat on the United States District Court for the Southern District of New York vacated by Judge John F. X. McGohey. He was confirmed by the United States Senate on July 29, 1971, and received his commission on July 29, 1971. He served as Chief Judge from 1986 to 1993. He was a member of the Judicial Conference of the United States from 1989 to 1995. He assumed senior status on May 31, 2007. His service terminated on July 20, 2008, due to his death of cancer in New York City.

== Poisoning incident ==
In the late 1980s, Brieant was sent a box of chocolates anonymously. His wife ate several of the candies, and became violently ill. Investigation determined that the chocolates had been sent by John Buettner-Janusch, the former chairman of the New York University (NYU) Anthropology Department, who had been sentenced to prison by Brieant after being convicted of making illegal drugs. Buettner-Janusch was convicted of attempted murder.

== Anecdotes ==
Brieant was known as "Charlie" by his close friends and colleagues. He was also renowned by members of the bar for his Rollie Fingers-style mustache. For many years, Brieant displayed in his judicial chambers a painted portrait of Judge Martin Manton, a former Chief Judge of the United States Court of Appeals for the Second Circuit who was convicted and imprisoned for accepting bribes from litigants. When asked why he had rescued the portrait of the disgraced Manton from obscurity and given it a prominent place in his chambers, Brieant would tell visitors that the painting was a reminder of the fallibility of judges.

== Honor ==
The federal courthouse in White Plains, New York, where Brieant sat for the last several years of his judicial career, was thereafter renamed the Charles L. Brieant Jr. Federal Building and Courthouse in his honor.

== See also ==
- List of United States federal judges by longevity of service

== Sources ==
Legal offices
| Preceded by John F. X. McGohey | Judge of the United States District Court for the Southern District of New York; 1971–2007 | Succeeded by Paul G. Gardephe |
| Preceded by Constance Baker Motley | Chief Judge of the United States District Court for the Southern District of New York; 1986–1993 | Succeeded by Thomas P. Griesa |
