= Michael J. Dillon Memorial United States Courthouse =

Coordinates: 42.885790°N 78.877080°W

City of Buffalo Police and Fire Headquarters at the Michael J. Dillon U.S. Courthouse Building
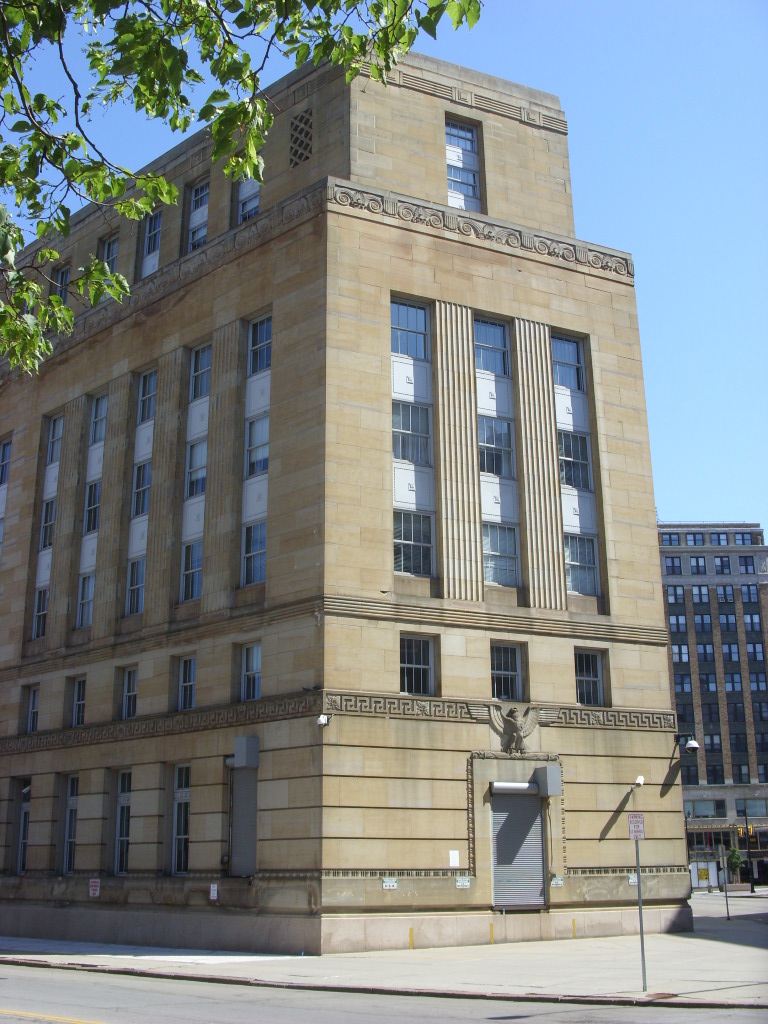
- Interactive map of the City of Buffalo Police and Fire Headquarters at the Michael J. Dillon U.S. Courthouse Building area
- Former names: Michael J. Dillon Memorial; United States Courthouse

General information
- Type: Low rise
- Architectural style: Art Moderne
- Location: 68 Court Street, Buffalo, New York
- Completed: 1936

Design and construction
- Architects: Green and Sons; Bley and Lyman

The City of Buffalo Police and Fire Headquarters at the Michael J. Dillon U.S. Courthouse Building is the headquarters for the Buffalo Fire Department and Buffalo Police Department and serves as a public safety building. The building had previously served as a courthouse of the United States District Court for the Western District of New York for nearly 80 years. Built in 1936, the building was renamed Michael J. Dillon Memorial U.S. Courthouse in 1986 in honor of murdered IRS Revenue Officer Michael J. Dillon. It is located at 68 Court Street.

== Building history ==
The monolithic U.S. Courthouse in Buffalo, officially rededicated in 1987 in honor of longtime Internal Revenue Service employee Michael J. Dillon, occupies an entire block along Niagara Square, the city's civic center since 1802. Construction of the seven-story sandstone and steel courthouse in 1936 resulted from Buffalo's evolution as one of the country's most important industrial centers, which brought numerous federal agencies to the city. The courthouse concentrated the federal presence in an excellent example of the Art Moderne architecture favored for government buildings funded by President Franklin D. Roosevelt's New Deal programs.

Federal government facilities had become so overcrowded by 1928 that the citizens of Buffalo pressured Congress for a new building to house all Federal offices in the city. The Emergency Relief and Construction Act of 1932 authorized the construction of a number of federal buildings, including the Dillon Courthouse. Under the authority of the 1926 Public Buildings Act, the Office of the Supervising Architect was responsible for the design of all federal buildings. Due to economic pressures on small architectural firms during the Depression, local architects received some of these commissions. In January 1933, the Supervising Architect's Office retained two influential Buffalo firms, Green and Sons and Bley and Lyman, to prepare plans for the new courthouse.

Because of the unusual shape of the site, the architects created a pentagonal building. The courthouse is a unique example of Art Moderne architecture because of its unusual shape and low-relief carved ornament. Originally planned as a twelve-story building, limited funding reduced its size to seven stories. President Roosevelt dedicated the courthouse on October 17, 1936 — his speech emphasizing the vital partnership between the Federal government and local officials in creating public works to overcome the devastating effects of the Depression.

In 2004, the Dillon Courthouse was nominated to the National Register of Historic Places as a contributing element of the Joseph Ellicott Historic District in Buffalo.

After completion of Robert H. Jackson United States Courthouse in 2012, Dillon Courthouse became vacant. In 2016 building was acquired by the City of Buffalo. Buffalo paid $1 for the courthouse and allocated $1.9 million for the renovation costs.

== Architecture ==
The courthouse occupies the entire block bounded by Niagara Street, Niagara Square, Court Street and Franklin Street. This block is irregularly-shaped, and slopes gently to the west-southwest. It is located in the central business district in an area described as the "civic center" because the courthouse, state office building, City Hall, and City Court, building are all located around Niagara Square. Constructed in 1935, this building is an unusually-shaped example of starved classicism, a style of Federal architecture that was prominent during this period. There are elements of Deco in the details.

The courthouse is seven stories in height, not including the penthouse structure. The building rests on a granite base, the height of which varies with the slope of the site. The building appears as a solid geometric mass, with planar walls and sparing detail. The height of the building from the first floor platform to the top of the seventh floor parapet is approximately 105 feet. There are seven bays along Court Street, and ten bays along Franklin Street. These bays create the principal structural grid; however, a secondary grid is created by the diagonal along Niagara Street, which is made up of seven bays. There are five bays along Niagara Square, which is part of the principal grid. All floor plans have the same pentagonal shape; however, the upper two floors are set back from the primary building plane. The building is clad in yellow-grey sandstone panels with cast aluminum spandrel panels and carved sandstone detailing. The windows are organized one above the other in vertical openings in the stone cladding. All windows have galvanized steel sash and frames, and are all either double-hung or fixed-sash with operable awning windows.

Detailing is concentrated at the entries, the first-floor level, and building parapets. One of the two main building entries is located at approximately the midpoint of the Court Street elevation. A smooth stone surround projects slightly from the building plane, where the doors and transoms are recessed slightly. The stone surround is capped by a monumental carved eagle and the words "United States Court House" are incised into the stone above the entry. The entry doors, frames, and transoms are cast aluminum with ornamental grillework and a cast bronze medallion over the center door. The second entry is at Niagara Street, and is identical except there is no entry platform.

There are several significant and generally original spaces in the interior. The main lobby, post office lobby and financial lobby link visually on the first floor and are distinguished from each other by ceiling height and columns. The post office lobby has writing desks with ornamental cast aluminum frames, aluminum window frames and details in the post office screen, and lantern light fixtures in each column that match those of the vestibules. The floors are buff terrazzo bordered in dark green marble with matching marble base. At intervals along the main lobby floor are circle and star patterns of colored terrazzo. The walls and columns are clad in travertine, except where the financial lobby has been remodeled. The ceiling in the main lobby has a fretwork molding with floral panels, which are polychrome. All trim is travertine, and at the elevators there are dark green marble pilasters topped by bronze medallions at each end and between each elevator. The light fixtures in the main lobby are drum shaped and have aluminum frames with a star motif.

There are four original courtrooms in the building. The main ceremonial courtrooms A and D are on axis, off a common lobby on the 6th floor; courtroom C is on the seventh floor, and the Bankruptcy Court is on the 4th floor. The Bankruptcy Courtroom has wood panel wainscot with molded cap, dark green marble border and base and plaster walls and ceilings. The ceilings have an ornamental plaster cornice with six plaster ceiling medallions, from which are suspended original hexagonal bronze light fixtures. The Courtroom C is on the seventh floor. The walls of this courtroom are covered with wood paneling with elaborate detailing. There is a dark green marble base and wood wainscot with molded cap. The upper panels are vertical grain wood. The judge's bench and jury box have a carved band around the top, and dark green marble base. The solid court rail has the same detailing as the wainscot. The plaster ceiling has a polychrome ornamental band of fretwork motif and two rows of three plaster medallions from which original bowl-shaped bronze light fixtures hang.

The ceremonial courtrooms - A and B - on the sixth floor are almost identical. These courtrooms are accented with a dark green marble base which continues around the base of the judges bench. There is wood wainscot with wood moldings and wainscot cap. The wainscot extends around the courtroom and is broken by the entry doors and the panel behind the judge's bench. On either side of the judge's bench, the wall above the wainscot is paneled in wood. There is a fluted wood pilaster at each front corner of the courtroom also topped with carved wood eagles. The courtroom doors are centered in the east wall and are leather-covered panel doors, with bronze stars inserted in each panel. The surround is wood with a pedimented head, a laurel wreath and shield in the pediment. An elaborate ornamental plaster band around the ceiling is composed of alternating squares with stars and flowers. There are six original light fixtures that are drum-shaped.

The Judges' Chambers with their wood paneled walls and molded plaster ceilings are also significant. On the fourth floor is the original U.S. Commissioner's Hearing Room, now a law library. This room is elaborately detailed with dark green marble border and base, wood wainscot and ornamental molded cornice with medallions.

The elevator lobbies retain the original dark green marble wainscot and door surrounds, and most of the public corridors retain the original terrazzo flooring.

With the exception of minor detailing, the tenant spaces have been altered. One significant original finish that is still present in many corridor areas is the hollow metal doors, chair rail, and surrounds throughout the building. The metal was grained to resemble wood, and operable transom hardware was internal.

While the exact layouts of the upper floors varies depending on the original uses, the general layout of corridors and offices is very similar. The elevator lobbies line up vertically above the main lobby, with elevators and stairs on the west side, and restrooms located on the east side of the lobbies. There are generally offices around the perimeter of the building with H-shaped or pentagonal corridors just to the interior of the offices. The mechanical and support spaces are centralized.

== Significant events ==
- 1932: The Emergency Relief and Construction Act authorizes construction of several Federal buildings, including the courthouse in Buffalo.
- 1933: Two Buffalo architectural firms, Green and Sons, and Bley and Lyman, are retained to prepare plans for the U.S. Courthouse on Niagara Square.
- 1936: The cornerstone of the courthouse is laid and President Franklin D. Roosevelt dedicates the building.
- 1987: The courthouse is named after Michael J. Dillon.
- 2004: The courthouse is nominated to the National Register of Historic Places as a contributing element of the Joseph Ellicott Historic District.
- Nov. 2016: The courthouse building is transferred from the federal government to the City of Buffalo for $1.

== In popular culture ==
The courthouse was in the 2017 movie, Marshall, about the life of Supreme Court Justice Thurgood Marshall, portrayed by Chadwick Boseman, and directed by Reginald Hudlin.
