= Niagara Square =

Public square in Buffalo, New York

- City square
- {{{other_names}}}
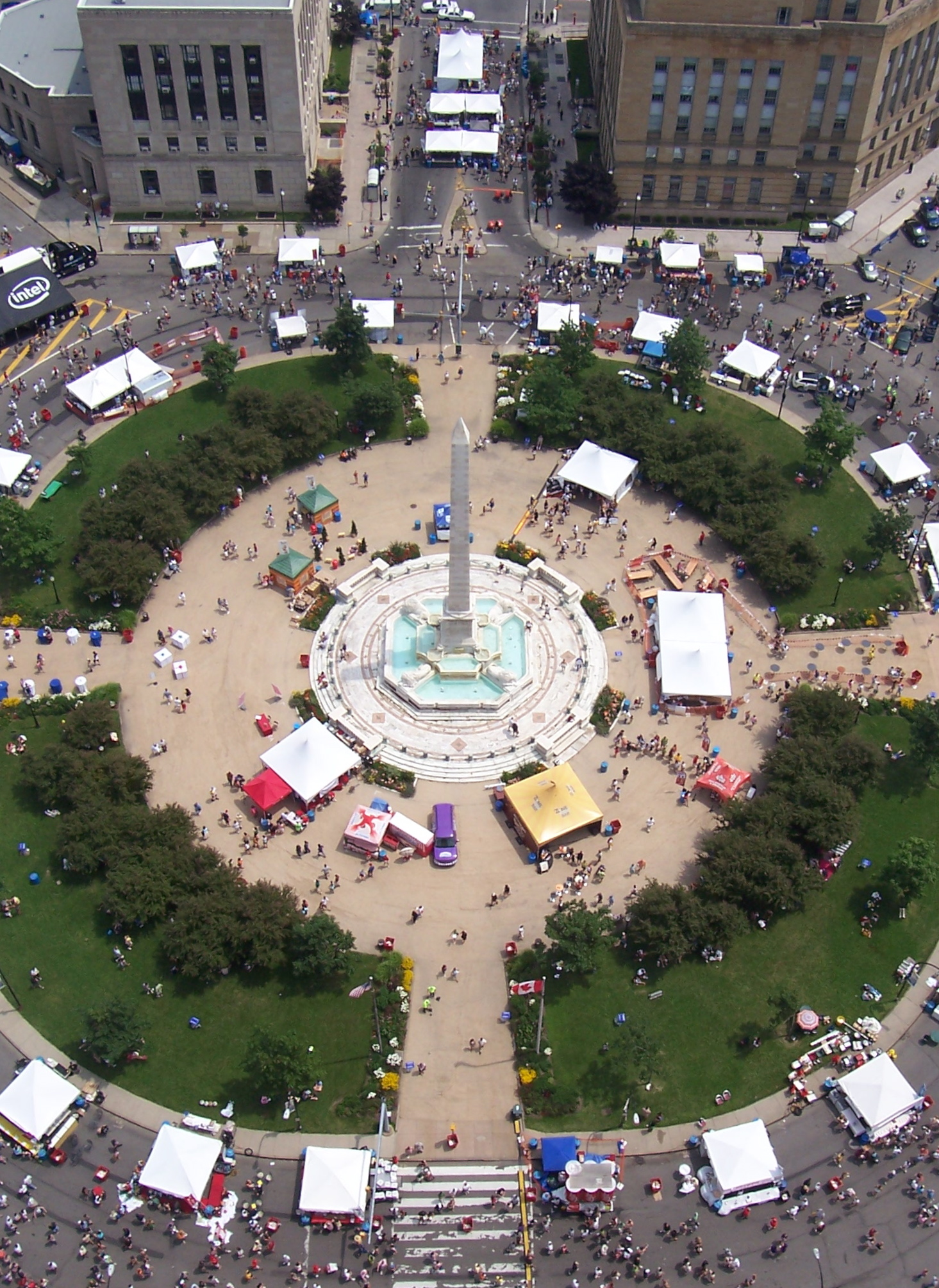
- View of the Taste of Buffalo held in Buffalo's Niagara Square, taken from the City Hall observation deck
- Design: Joseph Ellicott
- Opened: 1805
- Owner: City of Buffalo
- Location: intersections of Delaware Avenue, Court Street, Genesee Street, and Niagara Street; Buffalo, New York
- Location within New York
- Coordinates: 42°53′11″N 78°52′41″W

Niagara Square is a public square located at the intersections of Delaware Avenue, Court Street, Genesee Street, and Niagara Street in Buffalo, New York. It is the central hub of Joseph Ellicott's original radial street pattern that he designed in 1804 for the then village of New Amsterdam. It continues to be the nexus of downtown Buffalo.

== History ==
The 1805 plan for the village of Buffalo

Niagara Square's origins date back to the conclusion of the French and Indian War in 1763, which ended French domination of the Niagara Frontier and marked the advent of permanent settlement of the area. This trend increased after the Revolution, and in 1804 Joseph Ellicott (1760–1826) mapped a town on the banks of Lake Erie at the mouth of the Buffalo Creek. The site of the city was part of the vast land holdings of the Holland Land Company, a Dutch firm that had purchased most of western New York. Ellicott, who was the local Holland Land Company agent, had earlier in his career helped his brother Andrew survey Pierre L'Enfant's plan for the new capital at Washington.

The influence of L'Enfant's Washington is readily apparent in Ellicott's design for Buffalo (first named New Amsterdam). Niagara Square, located near the lakefront, became the center from which eight streets radiated in several directions. Among the streets passing through Niagara Square was Delaware Street (after 1879 called Delaware Avenue), which Ellicott is said to have named for one of the Indian groups that frequented the portage road around nearby Niagara Falls.

Despite Ellicott's lofty vision for the new city — he said that the site was "developed by nature for the grand emporium of the Western world" — Buffalo remained for the first quarter of the nineteenth century a small village. As Buffalo's wealth and population grew in the 19th century, Niagara Square became a desirable residential address. Mayor Samuel Wilkeson, whose efforts to build the Buffalo Harbor were rewarded when the State of New York selected Buffalo as the terminus of the Erie Canal, built his mansion on the west side of Niagara Square, presently the site of City Hall.

=== 2020 Niagara Square police violence incident ===
External videos
- Footage of the incident between a 75-year-old man and officers, filmed by a WBFO news team

On June 4, 2020, amid the George Floyd protests in New York state, police officers from the Buffalo Police Department pushed 75-year-old Martin Gugino during a confrontation in Niagara Square, causing him to fall to the ground which left him bleeding from the ear. He was brought to the hospital and was in "serious but stable condition." Two days later he was still listed as being in "critical condition" at Erie County Medical Center. He suffered a brain injury as a result of the fall and was still unable to walk nearly two weeks after the assault. The BPD claimed in their official statement that the man "tripped and fell". Following the incident, Buffalo mayor Byron Brown announced that the city would pause arrests for marijuana possession and ease restrictions on releasing police body camera footage.

== Buildings and monuments ==
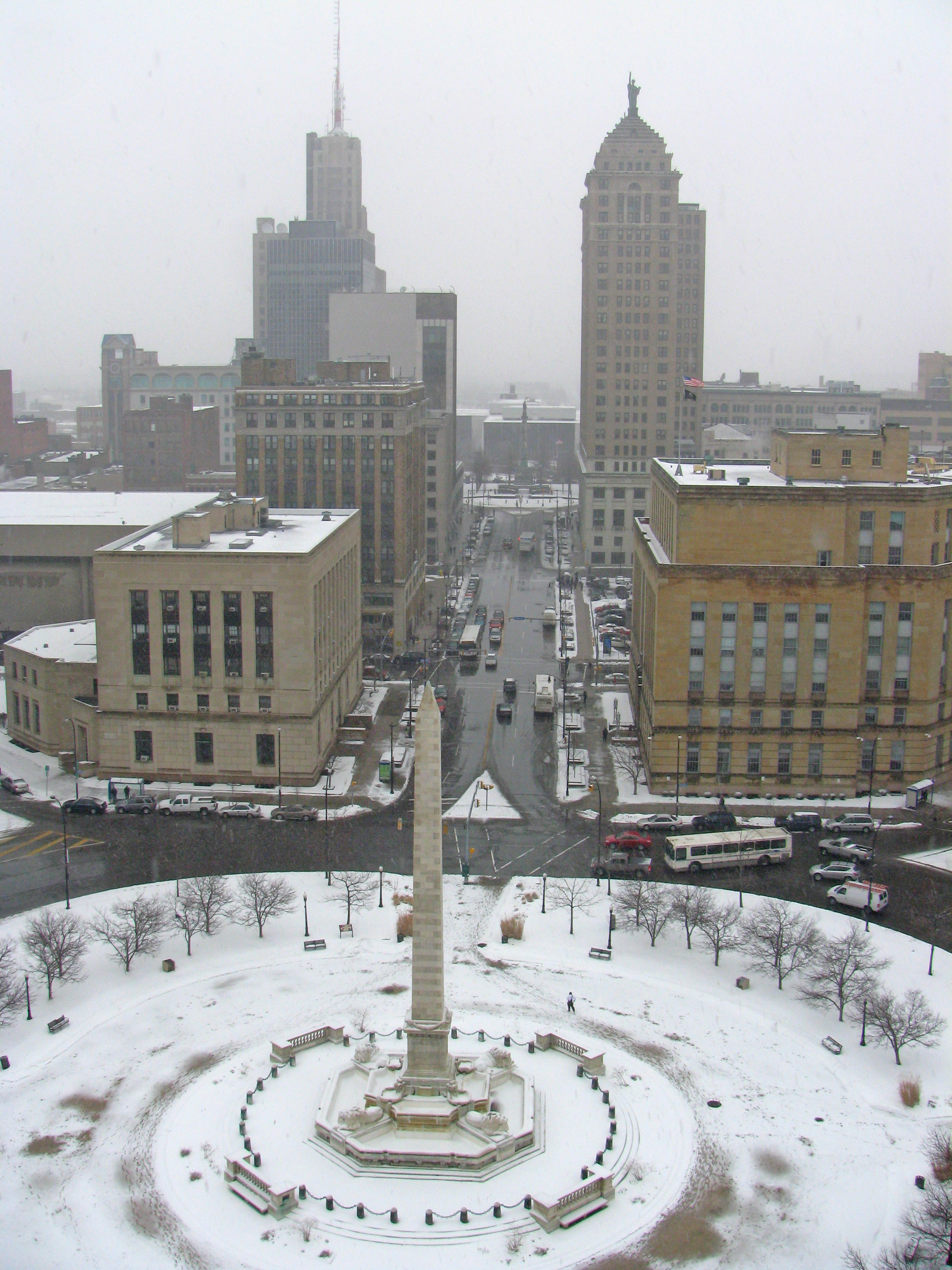
Niagara Square looking toward Lafayette Square from Buffalo City Hall in a snow flurry

The square's transformation from a residential neighborhood to the center of government began in the early 20th century, with the erection of Buffalo City Hall (1929–1931), Michael J. Dillon Memorial United States Courthouse (1935), and the Walter J. Mahoney State Office Building (1928–1932).

This square is also home to the Statler Towers, Buffalo Athletic Club, the Buffalo City Court Building, the Robert H. Jackson United States Courthouse to the northwest side, and several other office buildings.

Within the center of the modern square is a large monument commemorating the assassination of President McKinley, who was assassinated in Buffalo during the Pan-American Exposition of 1901.

== Gallery ==
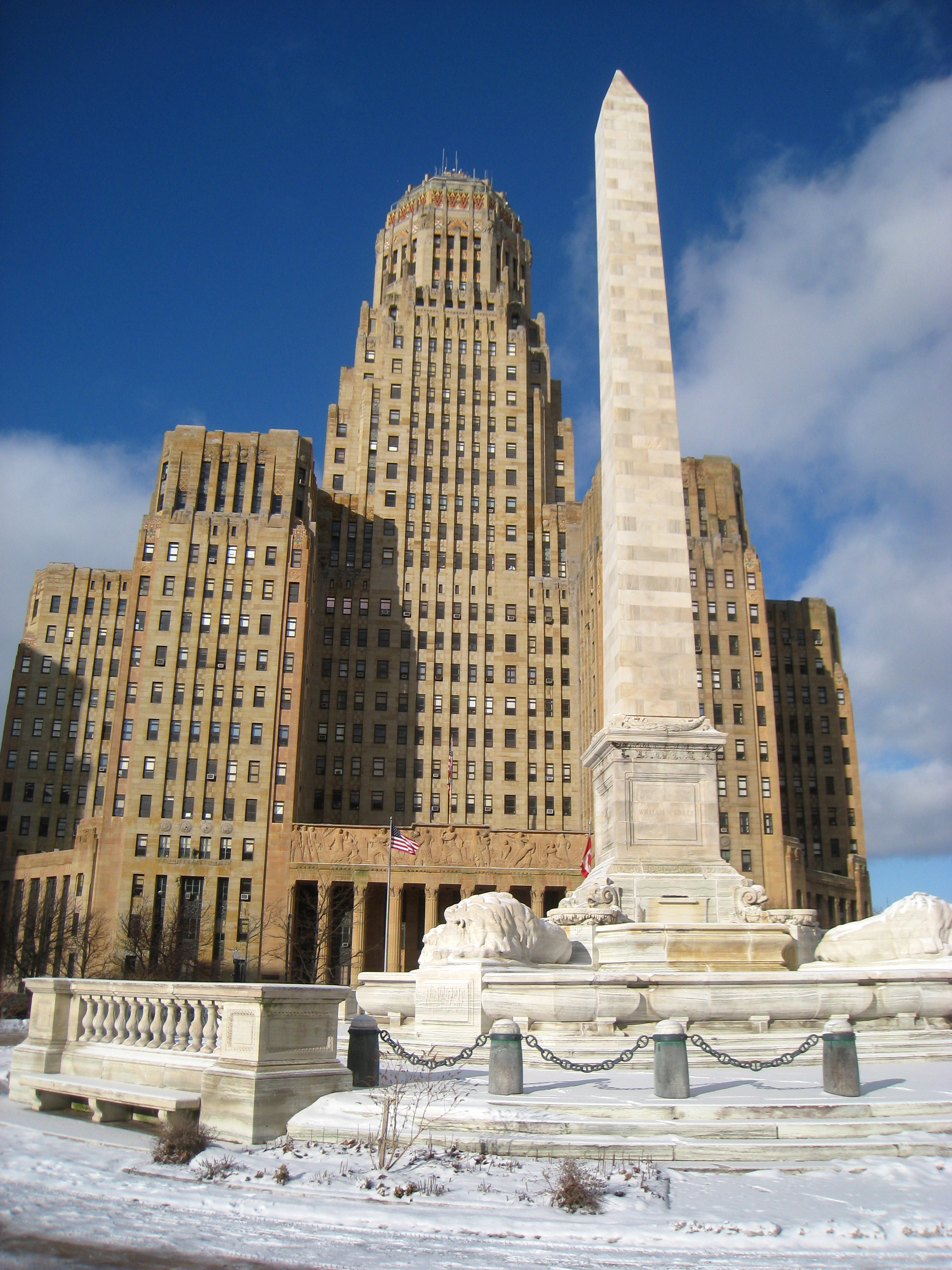
McKinley Monument and Buffalo city hall (2010)

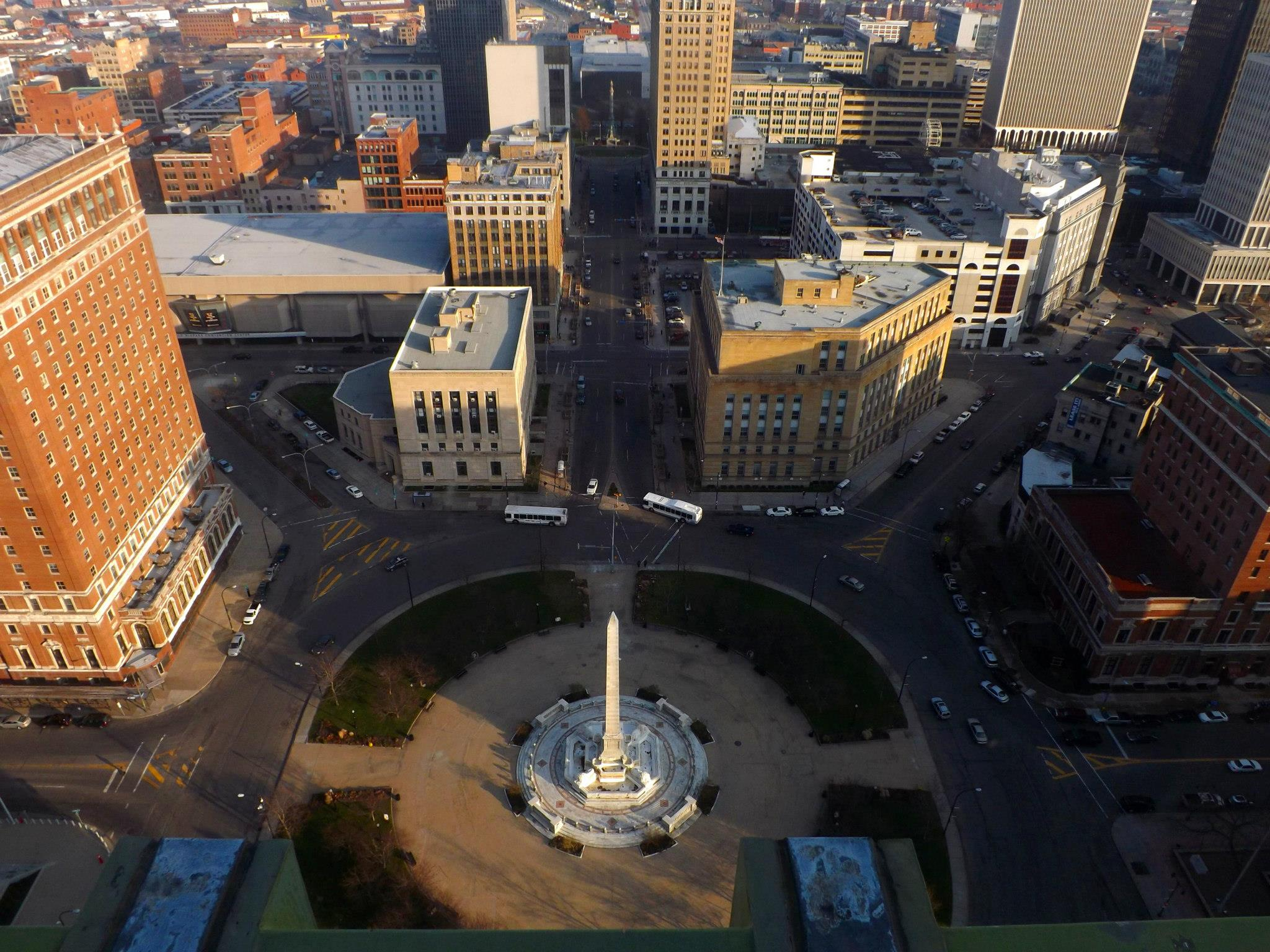
Niagara Square from City Hall Observation Deck (2012)

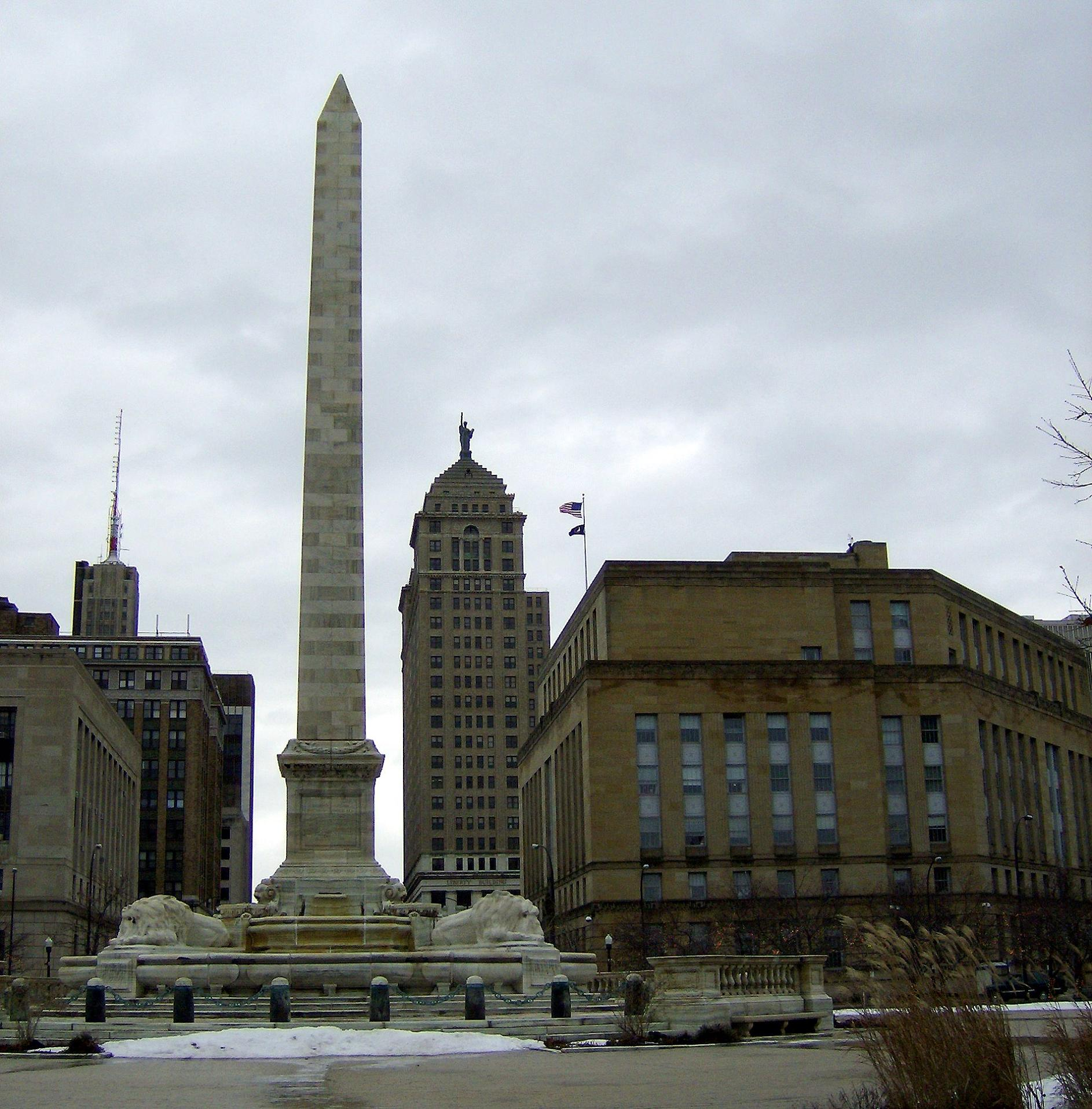
Niagara Square looking up Court Street with the US District Court on the right and the Liberty Building in the background

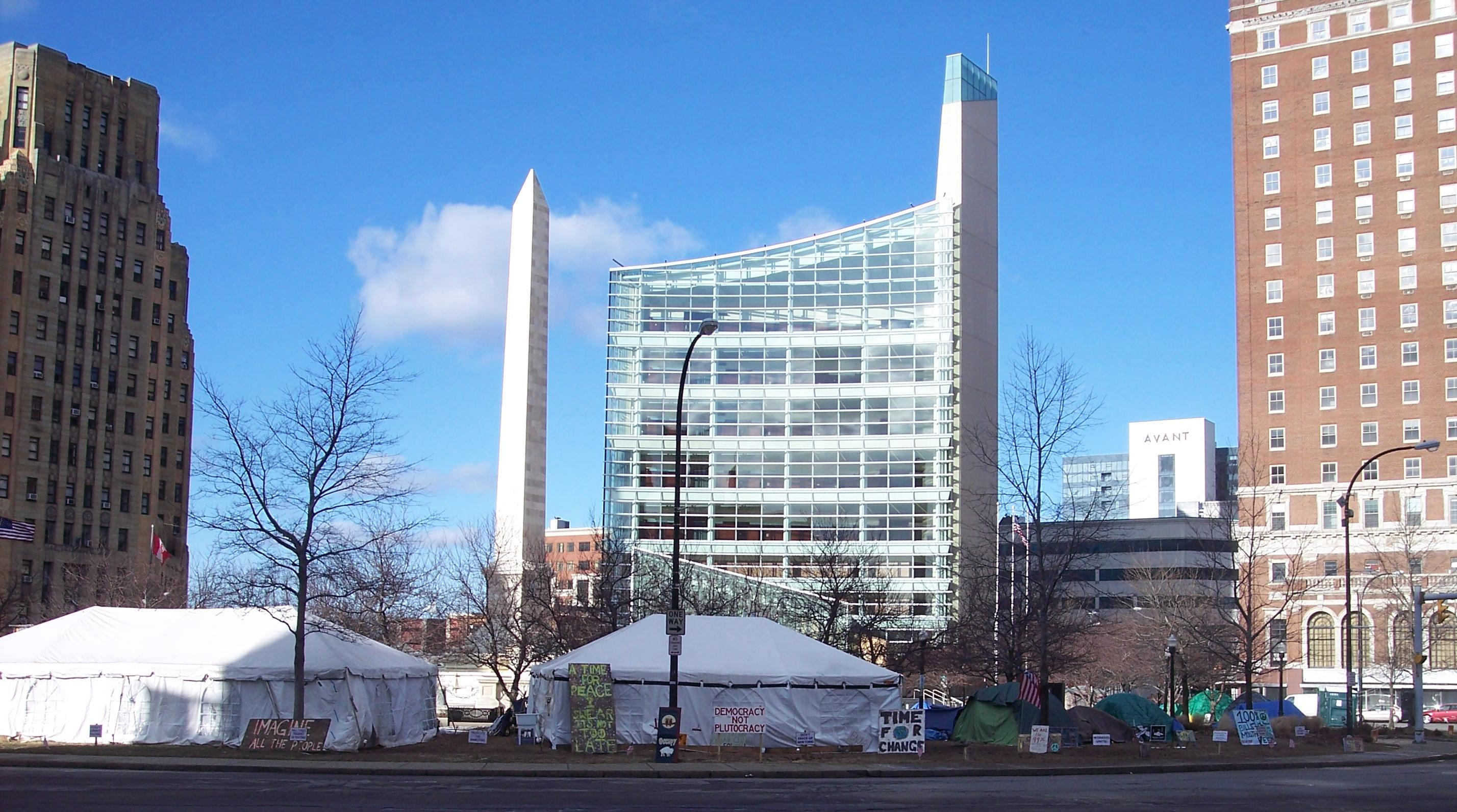
Occupy Buffalo protesters' camp (2012)
