= Michael Dillon (I.R.S. revenue officer) =

American IRS officer (1922–1983)

Lieutenant (junior grade) Michael Joseph Dillon Jr. (May 15, 1922 in Fall River, Massachusetts – September 23, 1983 in Cheektowaga, New York) was an officer of the US Internal Revenue Service since 1970, who is best known for being one of only two Internal Revenue Service (IRS) Revenue Officers to be killed in the line of duty. He previously served for the U.S. Navy in World War II. Vernon Hunter would be murdered 27 years later in the 2010 Austin suicide attack, becoming the second Revenue Officer to die in the line of duty.

== Death ==
Michael Dillon was killed on September 23, 1983, at the private residence of former service employee James F. Bradley, located at 250 S Huxley Dr, in Cheektowaga, New York, where he had attempted to collect a sum of $500 on behalf of the IRS. Bradley previously had been adjudicated deficient of $2,500, and had subsequently remitted $2,000 to the IRS. An altercation occurred when Dillon attempted to recover the remaining money owed, during which Bradley shot him three times in rapid succession, with an M-1 rifle at point-blank range, killing him instantaneously.

== James F. Bradley ==
James F. Bradley was convicted of first degree manslaughter before the Supreme Court of New York. His conviction was upheld on appeal by the Supreme Court Appellate Division, but was reversed by the Court of Appeals of New York. In 1997, Bradley pleaded guilty to first degree manslaughter. He was released on time served in April 1997 since he was 77 and in poor health.

== Legacy ==
In 1987, the U.S. Courthouse in Buffalo, New York was rededicated as the Michael J. Dillon Memorial United States Courthouse. Also in honor of Dillon, the IRS named a national "Michael Dillon Revenue Officer of the Year Award". This is the most prestigious award that a Revenue Officer can receive and is presented personally by the Director of Field Collection, citing the recipient's dedication, outstanding skills and commitment to quality service. In this award, the memory of Michael Dillon lives on while serving as a reminder that the job of a Revenue Officer is not without significant dangers.
