= 1880 Republican National Convention =

US political convention

- 1880 presidential election
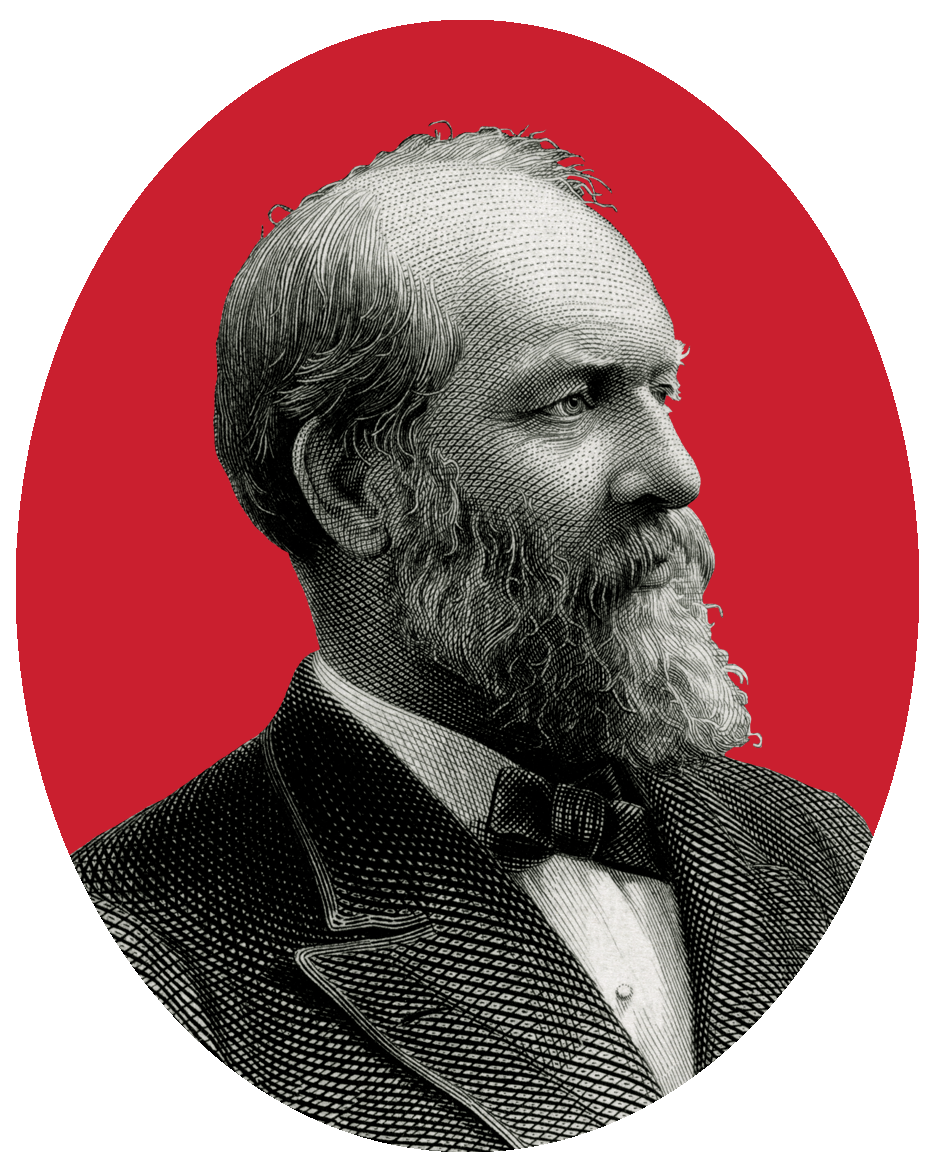
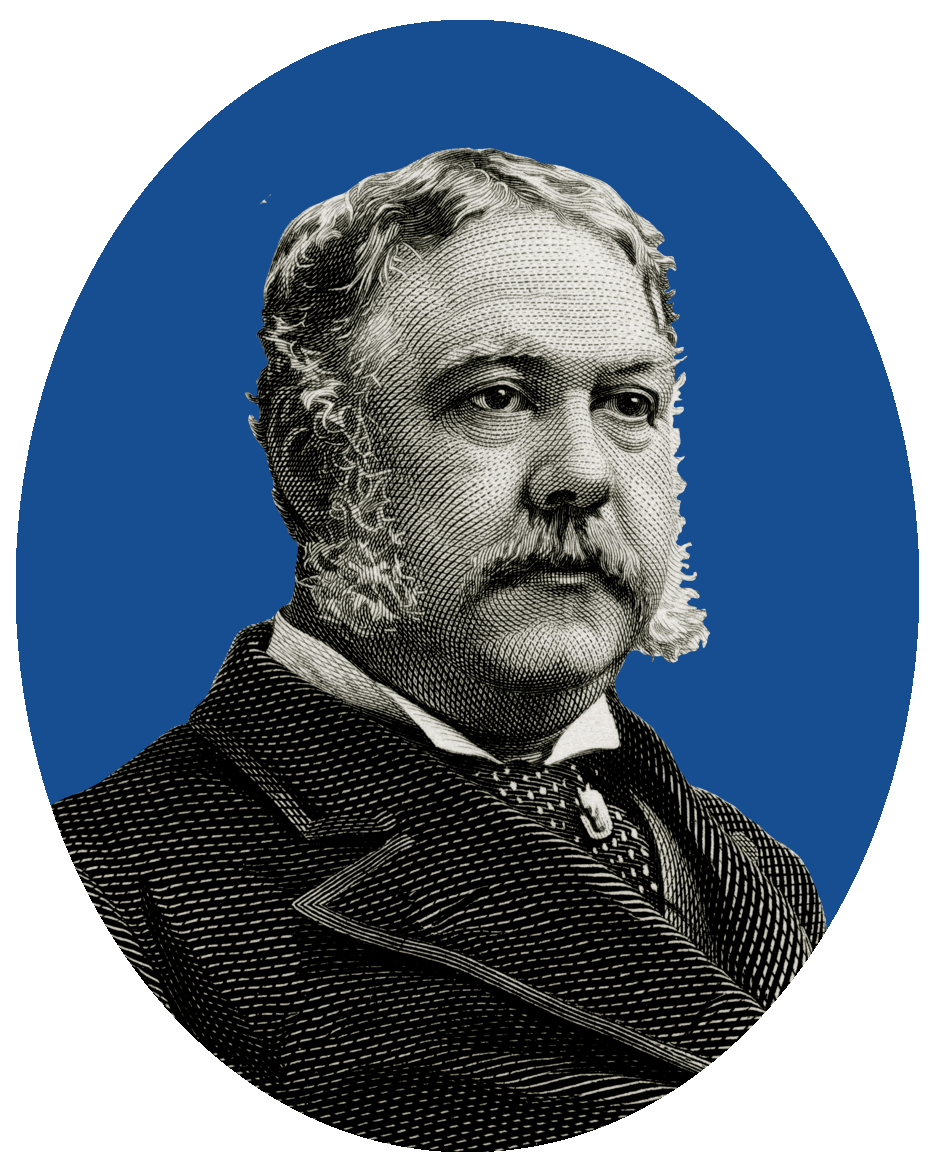
- Nominees; Garfield and Arthur

Convention
- Dates: June 2–8, 1880
- City: Chicago, Illinois
- Venue: Exposition Hall
- Chair: George Frisbie Hoar

Candidates
- Presidential nominee: James A. Garfield of Ohio
- Vice-presidential nominee: Chester A. Arthur of New York
- Other candidates: Ulysses S. Grant; James G. Blaine

Voting
- Total delegates: 755
- Votes needed for nomination: 378 (majority)
- Results (president): Garfield (OH): 399 (52.85%); Grant (IL): 306 (40.53%); Blaine (ME): 42 (5.56%); Others: 8 (1.06%)
- Results (vice president): Arthur (NY): 468 (61.99%); Washburne (IL): 193 (25.56%); Others: 90 (11.92%)

The 1880 Republican National Convention was held from June 2 to June 8, 1880, at the Interstate Exposition Building in Chicago, Illinois, United States. Delegates nominated James A. Garfield of Ohio and Chester A. Arthur of New York as the official Republican Party candidates for president and vice president in the 1880 presidential election.

Of the 14 men in contention for the Republican nomination, the three strongest leading up to the convention were Ulysses S. Grant, James G. Blaine, and John Sherman. Grant had served two terms as president from 1869 to 1877, and was seeking an unprecedented third term in office. He was backed by the Stalwart faction of the Republican Party, which supported political machines and patronage. Blaine was a senator and former representative from Maine who was backed by the Half-Breed faction of the Republican Party. Sherman, the brother of Civil War General William Tecumseh Sherman, was serving as Secretary of the Treasury under President Rutherford B. Hayes. A former senator from Ohio, he was backed by delegates who did not support the Stalwarts or Half-Breeds.

With 378 votes required to obtain the nomination, on the first ballot Grant received 304 votes, Blaine 285, and Sherman 93. Balloting continued for several days without producing a nominee. After the thirty-fifth ballot, Blaine and Sherman switched their support to a new "dark horse", James Garfield. On the next ballot, Garfield won the nomination with 399 votes, 93 more than Grant. Garfield's Ohio delegation chose Chester A. Arthur, a Stalwart, as Garfield's running mate. Arthur won the vice presidential nomination with 468 votes, and the longest-ever Republican National Convention adjourned. The Garfield–Arthur Republican ticket narrowly defeated Democrats Winfield Scott Hancock and William Hayden English in the 1880 presidential election.

== Background ==
As President of the United States, Rutherford B. Hayes had caused tension within the post-American Civil War Republican Party. In an effort to aid post-war Reconstruction, he had offered government appointments to Southern Democrats, most of whom were former Confederates. His actions were contrary to the then-prevailing spoils system of patronage appointments and the campaign strategy of "waving the bloody shirt" employed by Republicans in the years after the war. Hayes's actions drew heavy criticism from party loyalists, including Roscoe Conkling of New York, leader of the Stalwarts, and James G. Blaine of Maine, leader of the Half-Breeds. Hayes had known since the dispute over the 1876 election that he was unlikely to win in 1880, and had announced at his 1877 inauguration that he would not run for a second term. Without an incumbent in the race, the Stalwarts and Half-Breeds each hoped to nominate their candidate.

=== Ulysses S. Grant ===
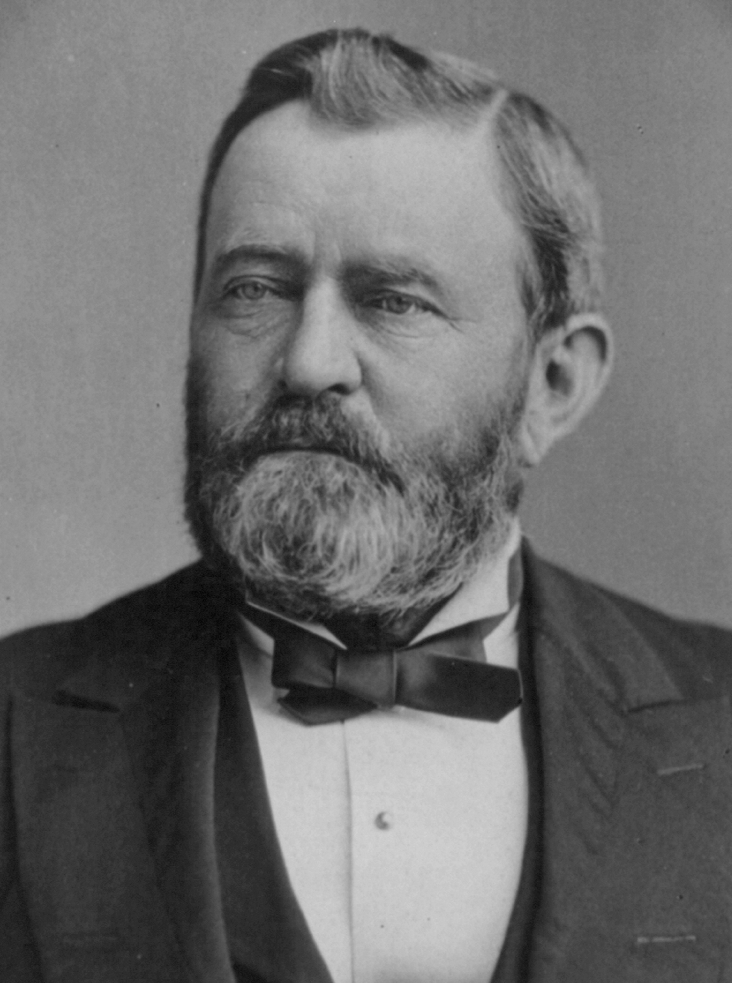
President Ulysses S. Grant, c. 1880

At the close of Grant's two terms as president in 1877, the Republican-controlled Congress suggested that Grant not return to the White House for a third term. Grant did not seem to mind and even told his wife Julia, "I do not want to be here [in the White House] another four years. I do not think I could stand it." After Grant left the White House, he and his wife used their US$85,000 savings to travel around the world. (Note: $85,000 in 1880 is equivalent to $2.7 million in 2024.) A biographer from the New York Herald, John Russell Young, traveled with the Grants and documented their journey in a book called Around the World with General Grant. Young saw that Grant's popularity was soaring, as he was treated with splendid receptions at his arrivals in Tokyo and Peking.

After Hayes' falling-out with the Republican Party and a perceived desire on the part of the United States' electorate for a strong man in the White House, Grant returned to the United States ahead of schedule, in hopes of seeking a third term. With the backing of the Stalwarts and calls for a "man of iron" to replace the "man of straw" in the White House, Grant was confident that he would receive the Republican nomination. Roscoe Conkling, leader of the Stalwart faction, formed a "triumvirate" with J. Donald Cameron of Pennsylvania and John A. Logan of Illinois to lead Grant's campaign. Conkling supported Grant because a Grant victory would give Stalwarts great influence in the White House. Grant accepted Stalwart support because he knew he could count on Stalwart leaders to solidify their state delegations at the convention, which would propel him toward the nomination. Conkling was so confident that he said, "Nothing but an act of God could prevent Grant's nomination." An aide to the ex-president, Adam Badeau, commented that Grant "displayed as much anxiety as I ever saw him display on his own account."

However, close friends of Grant saw that public support for his return to the White House was slipping. John Russell Young took Grant aside and told him he would lose the election, and should withdraw to avoid embarrassment. Young argued that Grant was being heavily attacked by opponents, who were against a third term. Young also told Grant that if he won, he would be indebted to the triumvirate. Grant felt that his Stalwart friends had been of great assistance and deserved political patronage if he won. Nonetheless, he listened to Young, and wrote a letter to J. Donald Cameron that authorized his name to be withdrawn from the nomination contest if his other Stalwart backers concurred. Upon hearing of his letter, Julia Grant was insistent that her husband should not withdraw his name. She said, "If General Grant were not nominated, then let it be so, but he must not withdraw his name – no, never." Young delivered the letter to the triumvirate in Chicago on May 31, but they took no action.

=== James G. Blaine ===
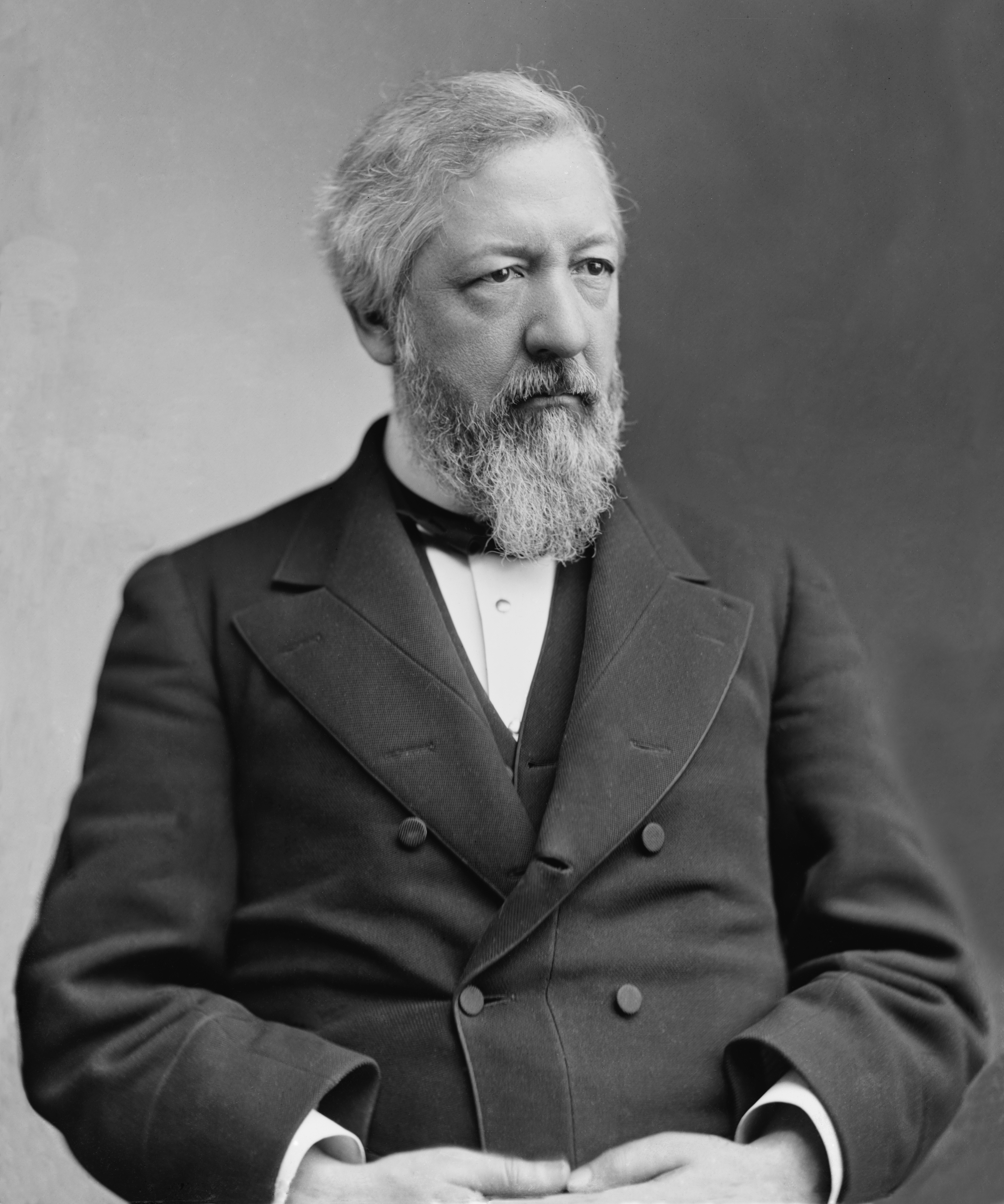
James G. Blaine, c. 1870s

The other main contender for the Republican nomination was James G. Blaine, US senator from Maine. Blaine had previously served in the United States House of Representatives, including serving as Speaker of the House from 1869 to 1875. Blaine and Conkling had a long-standing feud that started during an 1866 debate on the floor of the House of Representatives, and Blaine hoped to win, or to damage Conkling by preventing Grant's nomination. Four years earlier Blaine had campaigned for the nomination; in the weeks prior to the 1876 convention, he was accused of committing fraudulent activities involving railroad stocks. The specifics of Blaine's involvement were detailed in the Mulligan letters. Blaine pleaded his own defense on the floor of the House of Representatives, and read aloud selected, edited portions of the letters that were not incriminating. Despite his attempt to clear his name, Blaine was tarnished by the scandal for the rest of his career.

On the Sunday before balloting was to begin in Cincinnati, Ohio, Blaine collapsed at the steps of Washington Congregational Church. He was unconscious for two days, and as a result, he lost supporters who were doubtful over his health and whether he was capable of handling the presidency. Blaine was also ridiculed by opponents, who accused him of faking illness to gain sympathy; the New York Sun headlined "Blaine Feigns a Faint". On the first ballot of the 1876 convention, Blaine received 285 votes, while Conkling was in second place with 99. After five more ballots resulted in no consensus, on the seventh ballot Conkling and other candidates switched their support to Hayes to ensure Blaine would not be nominated. Hayes defeated Blaine by 384 votes to 351.

After Blaine's failure in 1876, his supporters believed that he needed to be nominated in 1880 if he was ever going to be president, reasoning that if he tried for the nomination twice and failed, he could not count on another opportunity. As his campaign manager, William E. Chandler, put it:

He must be nominated at Chicago in June, or else forever give up any idea of gaining the Chief Magistry of the nation... I think he owes it to himself and to his friends all over the country who are ready to sacrifice everything for his success to do all that is in his power to win at Chicago.

Despite the Mulligan letters scandal, Blaine had succeeded remarkably in his 1880 campaign, attracting nationwide support for his candidacy. He argued for the gold standard, support for big business, a tariff to protect American jobholders, civil rights for freed Blacks and Irish independence.

=== John Sherman ===
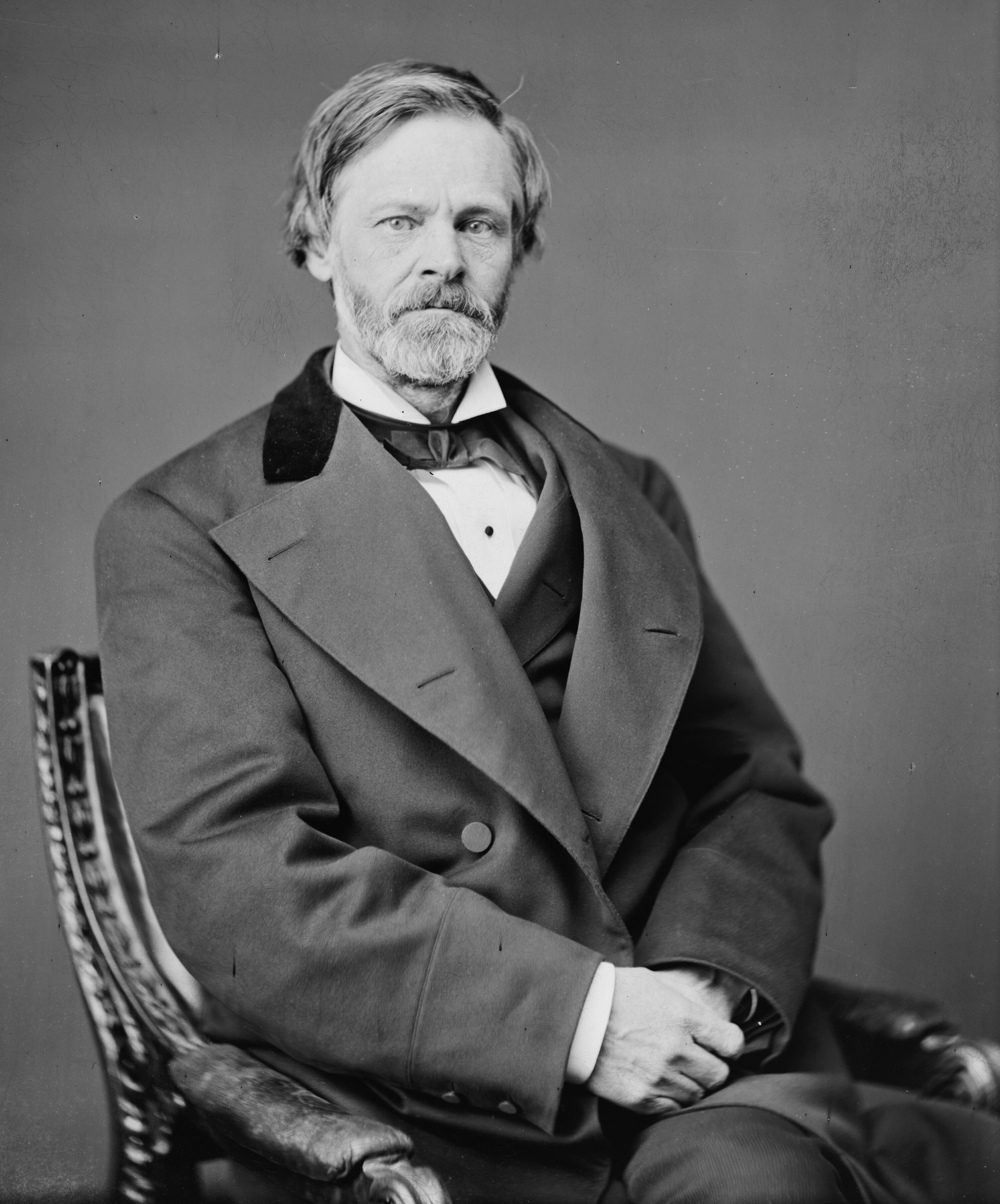
John Sherman as treasury secretary

John Sherman was a longtime senator from Ohio who also served the state in the House of Representatives in the late 1850s and early 1860s. As a senator, Sherman led the planning of the national banking system. He also oversaw the national policy for the post-Civil War banking system, and helped restore the nation's finances after the Panic of 1873. Under President Hayes, Sherman served as the Secretary of the Treasury, advocating for the gold standard and building up the country's gold reserves.

Sherman's supporters did not have much confidence in his presidential bid. He was known as the "Ohio Icicle" for his uncharismatic personality, which made him unappealing to voters. His colleagues commented that in public, Sherman "was not eloquent, though a graceful speaker, confining himself almost entirely to statements of fact." In private, he was "reserved, self-contained", a personality with which many Americans were uncomfortable. If elected, Sherman intended to continue his support for the gold standard. Prior to the start of the convention, papers had predicted him to receive 110 votes in the balloting. Sherman felt that he still had a chance at the nomination if Grant's supporters broke apart after five or six ballots.

=== James Garfield ===
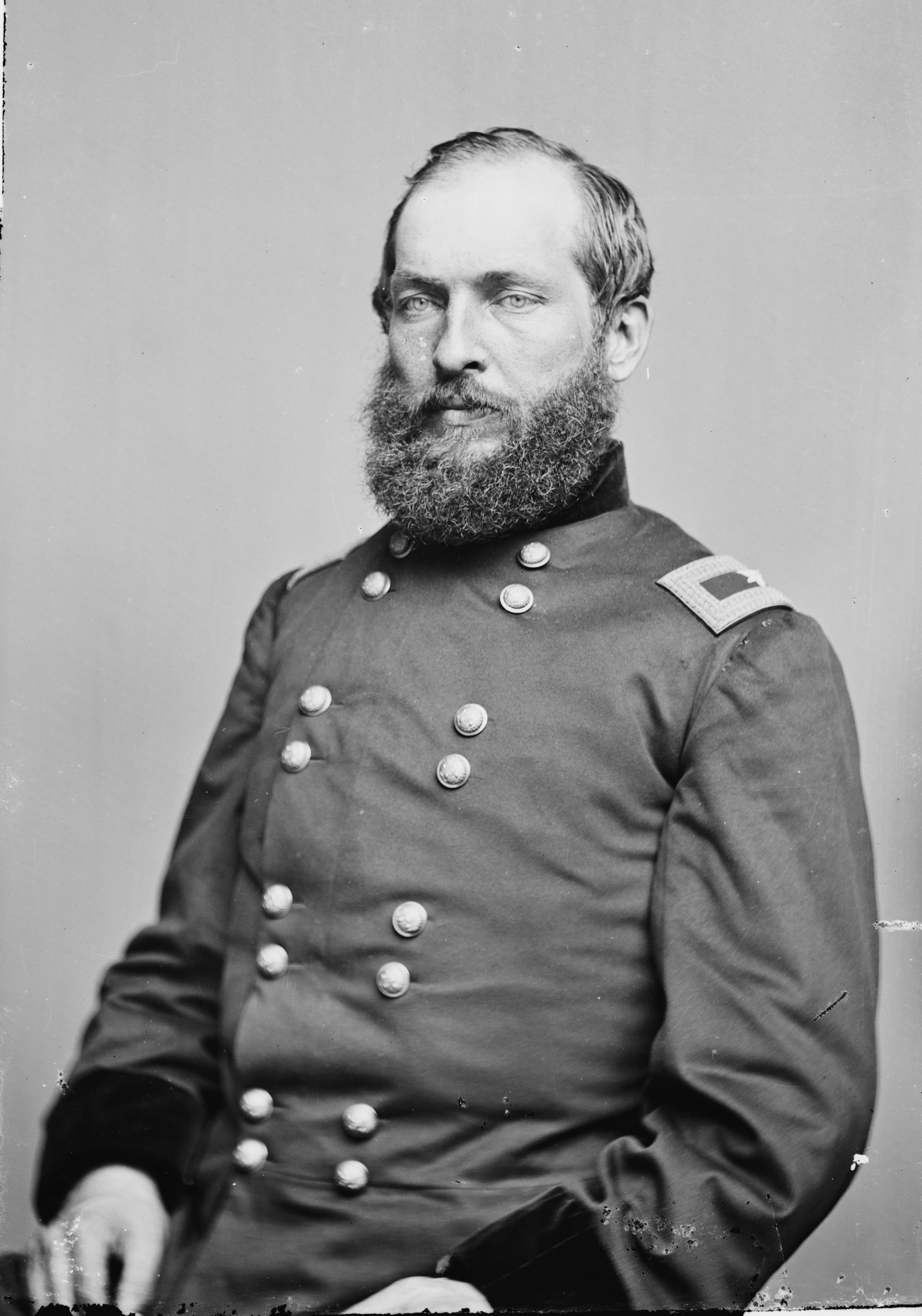
James A. Garfield as brigadier general during the Civil War

James Garfield came to Chicago as a senator-elect from Ohio, who had represented the state in the United States House since 1863. He was elected to the Ohio Senate in 1859, and the following year was admitted to the Ohio bar. He served as state senator until 1861, when he enlisted in the Union Army at the start of the Civil War. Garfield was assigned to command the 42nd Ohio Volunteer Infantry, and had the task of driving Confederate forces out of eastern Kentucky. Garfield led an attack with a number of infantry regiments against Confederate cavalry at Jenny's Creek on January 6, 1862. The Confederates retreated, and for leading his men to victory, Garfield was promoted to brigadier general in March 1862.

Garfield served under Major General Don Carlos Buell at the Battle of Shiloh and under Thomas J. Wood at the siege of Corinth. Garfield's health deteriorated and he was assigned to serve on a commission that investigated the conduct of Union general Fitz John Porter. In the spring of 1863, Garfield returned to the field as chief of staff for William S. Rosecrans, commander of the Army of the Cumberland. After the disastrous Chickamauga campaign in September 1863, Rosecrans was relieved of his command. Garfield had fought bravely during the battles, so his reputation was not damaged, and he was subsequently promoted to major general. Garfield's fame spread, and William Dennison engineered Garfield's 1862 election to Congress. As Whitelaw Reid commented, Garfield was "the most able and prominent of the young politicians who entered the army at the outbreak of the war." Garfield did not want to leave the army, so he personally visited President Abraham Lincoln for advice. Lincoln told Garfield that he had more generals than he could handle, and what he needed was political support, so Garfield took his seat in the House in December 1863.

Garfield was reelected every two years from 1864 to 1878. In 1872, he faced allegations of corruption for receiving $329 in tainted money in the Crédit Mobilier of America corruption scandal. Garfield denied the charges and hired William E. Chandler to defend him. There was not much evidence against Garfield, so no action was taken against him by Congressional investigators, and his political career was not significantly affected. Four years later, when James G. Blaine moved from the House to the United States Senate, Garfield became the Republican floor leader of the House. That year, Garfield served as a member of the Electoral Commission that awarded 20 contested electoral votes to Rutherford B. Hayes in his contest for the Presidency against Samuel J. Tilden. Though not affiliated with the Stalwarts or Half-Breeds, Garfield was a friend of Blaine. Prior to the 1880 Republican National Convention, Garfield expressed his support for Blaine, but when Sherman entered the race, Garfield backed his fellow Ohioan.

== Pre-convention politics ==
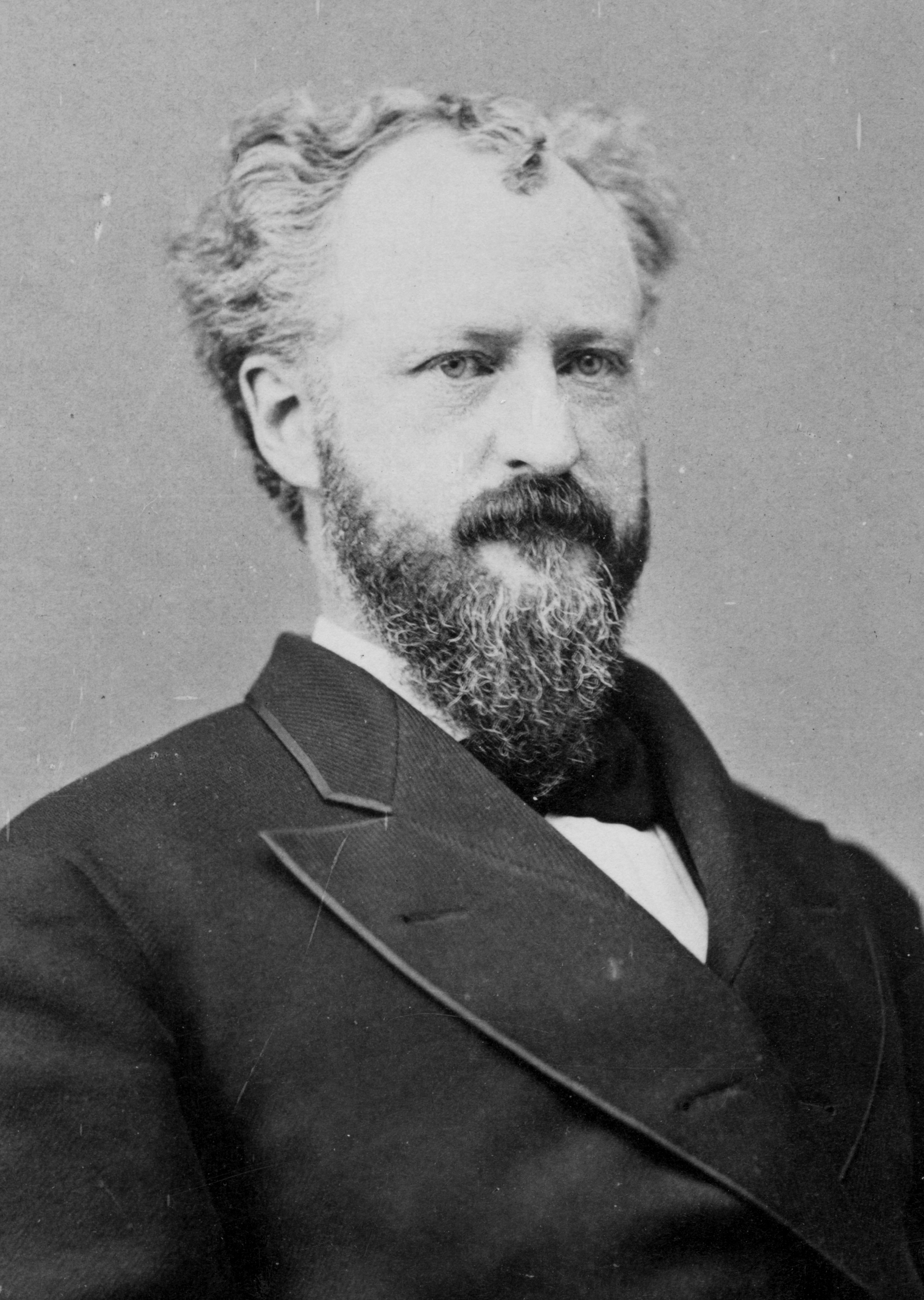
New York senator Roscoe Conkling, c. 1868

In January, local district caucuses picked delegates to state Republican conventions. The state conventions then selected delegates to the national convention. The candidates engaged in behind-the-scenes maneuvering, including Sherman's use of Treasury employees from Southern states who owed him their jobs taking part in local caucuses that elected state delegations loyal to Sherman. Each state-level leader then used state conventions to pick delegates loyal to the leader's candidate. In the New York state convention, which took place in Conkling's hometown of Utica, Grant's supporters won a 217–180 majority over Blaine's, but Conkling oversaw passage of a resolution declaring that, "the Republicans of New York believe the re-election of Ulysses S. Grant as presidential candidate of urgent importance, and the delegates this day assembled are called upon and instructed to use their earnest and united efforts to secure his nomination.

Conkling commanded delegates to follow the resolution, and if they were to violate it, he guaranteed they would be personally dishonored and subjected to political revenge. However, in Chicago, a number of New York delegates went against the resolution and expressed support for Blaine. J. Donald Cameron used similar tactics to intimidate dissenters at Pennsylvania's state convention. The third triumvir, John A. Logan, locked Blaine supporters out of the Illinois state convention and replaced them with personally chosen Grant supporters.

By May 29, four days before the opening of the convention, trainloads of delegates, lobbyists, reporters, and campaign followers had arrived at Chicago's Union and Dearborn railway stations. Candidate supporters channeled through the streets with daily parades and rallies. Pre-convention predictions of the outcome were published by a number of sources. The Albany Evening Journal predicted Blaine would begin with 277 votes, Grant with 317, Sherman with 106, and 49 for other candidates. No candidate was predicted to win on the first ballot the 379 votes necessary to claim the nomination. Many in Chicago knew that a victor, most probably Grant, would only be determined if the unit rule, which required all delegates from a state must vote for the candidate preferred by that state's delegation, was in effect. If not, then a long deadlock would result until at least one major candidate succumbed.

Before voting began, delegates had to make a determination on the unit rule. Prior to the start of the convention, Garfield noted, "I regard it [the unit rule] as being more important than even the choice of a candidate." If the unit rule was supported by a majority of the delegates, the triumvirate would solidify Grant's support and win the nomination. Unfortunately for the Half-Breeds, triumvir J. Donald Cameron was chairman of the Republican National Committee. Cameron planned to suppress any opposition to the unit rule. But his plan leaked, and within days almost all the delegates knew about it. Supporters of Sherman and Blaine knew that they had to stop Cameron. Blaine's forces agreed that they could only prevent Cameron from imposing the unit rule by removing him as the chair of the Republican National Committee.

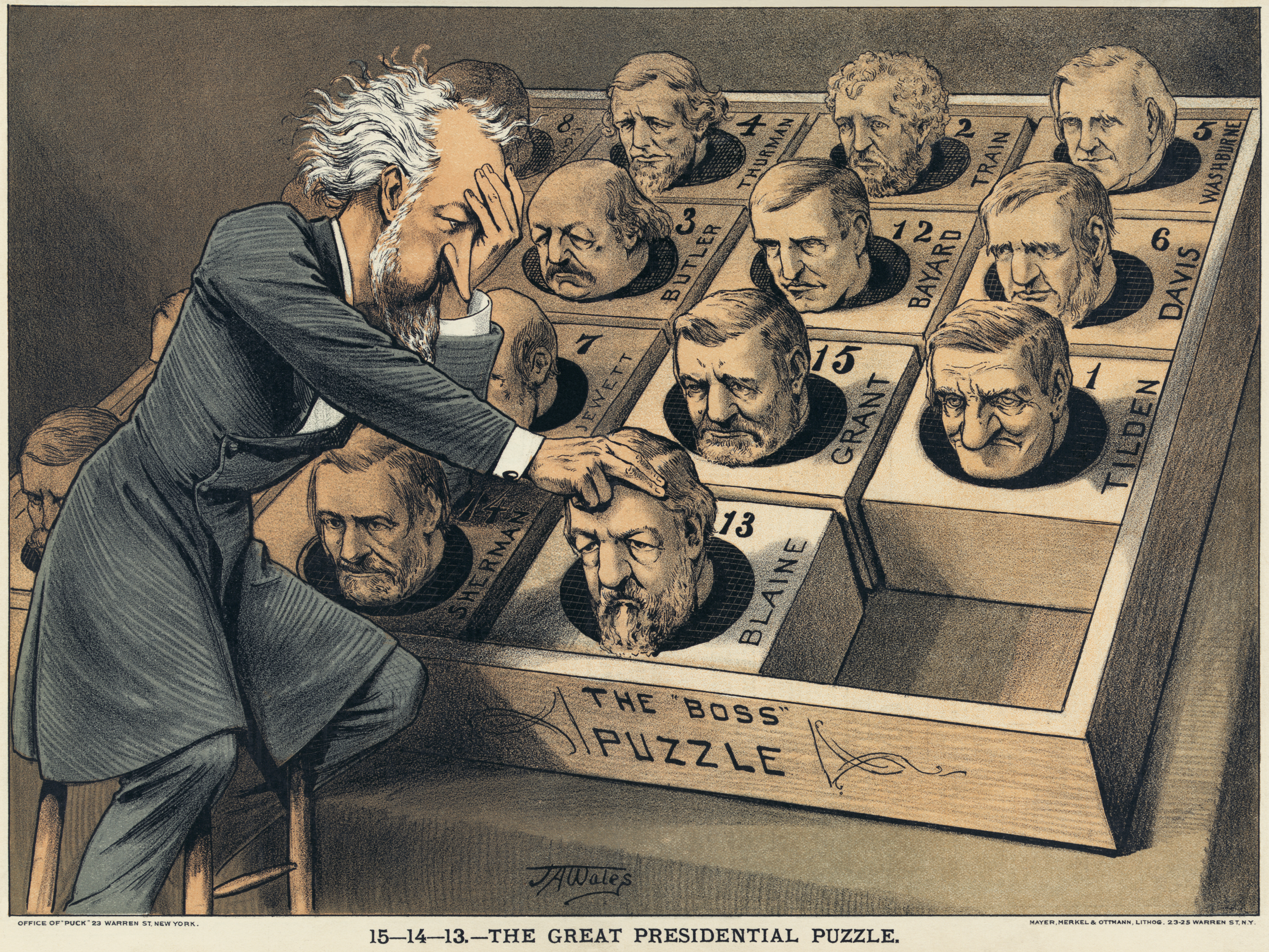
An 1880 political cartoon depicts Senator Conkling over a "presidential puzzle" consisting of some of the potential Republican and Democratic nominees as pieces of a sliding puzzle.

At 7:00 P.M. on May 31, Cameron convened the committee's last meeting before the convention. Of the forty-six attendees, Cameron counted only sixteen allies. The rest were anti-Grant delegates who planned to block Cameron. Colorado senator Jerome B. Chaffee handed Cameron a handwritten anti-unit rule motion that was orchestrated by William E. Chandler. Cameron expected this and ruled Chaffee's motion out of order. Under questioning by Chaffee, Cameron explained that the committee could only appoint a temporary convention chairman but could not vote on the unit rule, which he said was the purview of the convention's Rules Committee. Cameron then used a ruling from George Congdon Gorham, a California Stalwart delegate who as secretary of the United States Senate was an expert on parliamentary procedure, to sustain his action. One by one, anti-Grant delegates unsuccessfully tried to appeal Cameron's ruling. Gorham proclaimed that as committee chairman, Cameron could do "as he saw fit." Marshall Jewell, a Connecticut delegate and national committee member who had served as Grant's Postmaster General, spoke against Cameron's rulings. Cameron did not comment but called for a brief recess. After the recess, he acknowledged a motion from William E. Chandler to elect George Frisbie Hoar, a neutral senator and delegate from Massachusetts, as the convention's temporary chairman.

The committee voted 29–17 in favor of Hoar. The meeting adjourned at midnight and the members agreed to continue the following morning. News of Cameron's behavior spread throughout town overnight. His hardliner strategy had failed, and Conkling and other Grant managers sought to regain control of the situation before it became any worse. The next morning, Conkling asked his trusted colleague, Chester A. Arthur, to solve the problem. Arthur met with Chandler and the rest of the anti-Grant committee members at the entrance to the committee's suite. In the discussion, Arthur acknowledged that Grant's supporters had rejected Hoar as temporary chairman, but might be willing to reconsider. He proposed that if Grant's supporters agreed to Hoar as temporary chairman and delegates were permitted to decide on the unit rule in a free vote, Cameron would be retained chairman of the national committee. After discussing Arthur's proposal for a number of minutes, Chandler and Arthur came to agreement. Arthur was confident that since Chandler, the leader of Blaine's campaign, had accepted the deal, "it would be agreed by the Grant men." Chandler then discussed the compromise with the thirty anti-Grant committee members, and also with Garfield, who had previously expressed opposition to the unit rule. 23 of 30 anti-Grant men agreed to the terms, and Garfield commented that the proposition "must be accepted" in the "spirit of reconciliation."

The committee reconvened again on the afternoon of June 1, with Cameron sitting as the committee chairman. Arthur made a number of motions that indicated Grant's supporters from New York and Pennsylvania would support Hoar for temporary chairman of the convention. No one objected and the motions were accepted. The meeting then adjourned. A reporter from the New York Tribune later remarked that Grant's supporters had been "saved from utter ruin by the excellent management of General Arthur...."

== The convention ==
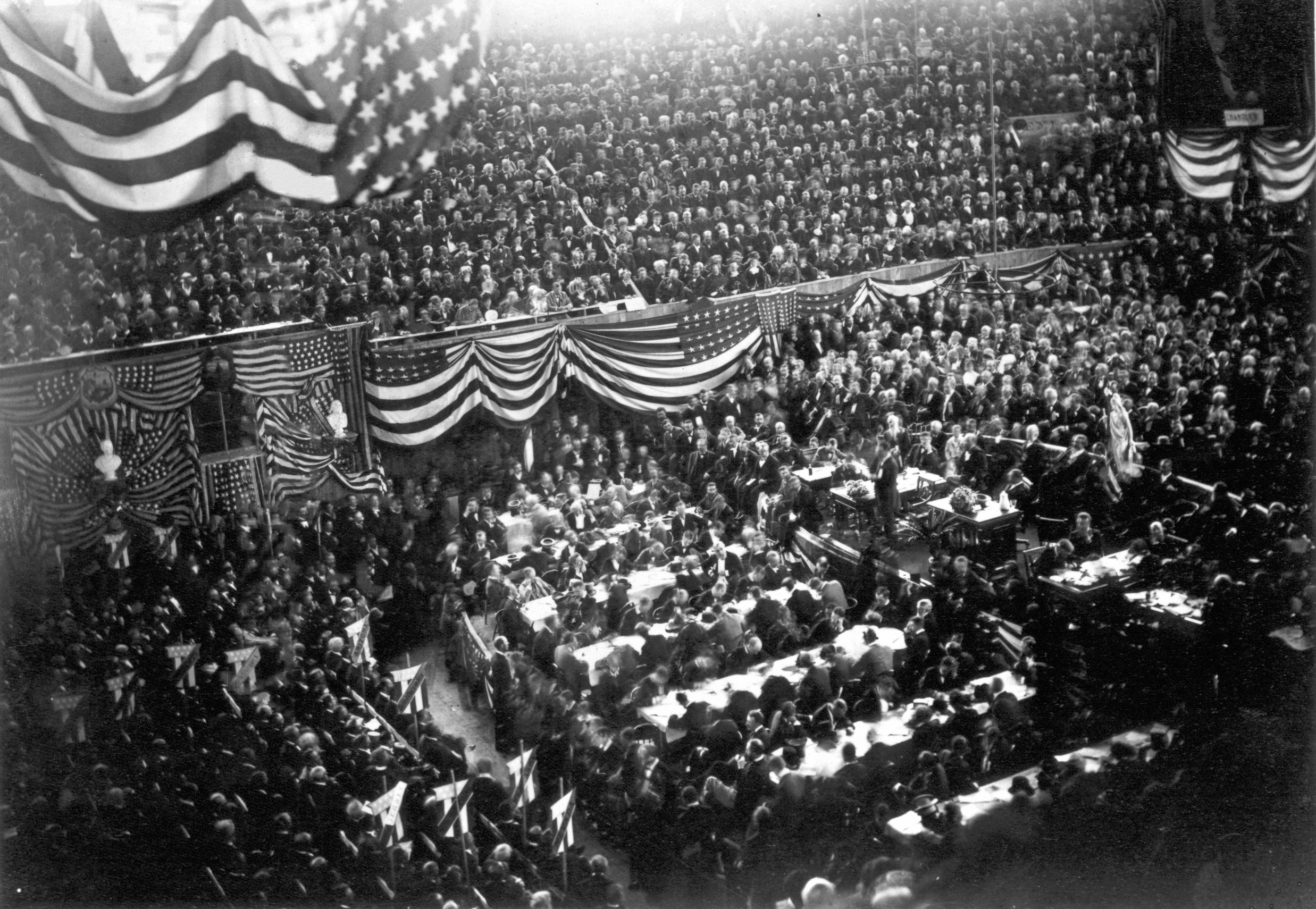
A view inside the Interstate Exposition Building (known as the "Glass Palace") during the convention; James Abram Garfield (center, right) is on the podium, waiting to speak.

At noon on Wednesday, June 2, Cameron gaveled in the seventh Republican National Convention and placed the nomination of Hoar as temporary chairman before the delegates, who approved unanimously. Delegates John H. Roberts of Illinois and Christopher L. Magee of Pennsylvania were selected to serve as temporary convention secretaries. Senator Eugene Hale of Maine submitted a resolution for a roll call, in which the chairman of each state delegation would announce his appointees to the convention's three committees. The committees were formed, and the convention adjourned at five minutes past three in the afternoon.

The convention reconvened at 11:00 A.M. on June 3. Conkling submitted a motion for a recess, which was rejected. Another New York delegate, Henry R. Pierson from the Committee on Permanent Organization, submitted a proposal to make the temporary convention assignments permanent. The motion was adopted, and the convention recessed until 5:00 P.M. After the recess, a motion was made for the Committee on Rules to be directed to report, but a substitute motion from George H. Sharpe of New York called for the Committee on Credentials to report. The substitute motion was rejected by a vote of 406 to 318, and the original resolution was laid on the table. At 7:30 P.M., the convention was adjourned until 10:00 A.M. the following morning.

The next morning, Conkling submitted a resolution that bound every delegate to support the party's presidential ticket. Conkling said that "no man should hold his seat here who is not ready so to agree." A voice vote was called, and the resolution received nearly unanimous delegate support. However, about a dozen or so delegates answered "no". Conkling was shocked. He asked, "[who] at a Republican convention would vote 'no' on such a resolution?" He then demanded a roll call. Most dissenters chose not to declare their disagreement on the record. Only three, all from West Virginia, voted "no", and they were showered with a "storm of hisses." Conkling then introduced a resolution to strip the three West Virginians of their votes. The West Virginians heavily criticized Conkling, prompting Garfield, who was sitting with the Ohio delegation, to try to settle the matter. He stated that the convention would be making a mistake by approving Conkling's motion, and asked for time to state his case. He went on to argue that the three West Virginians should not "be disenfranchised because they thought it was not the time to make such an expression [about a candidate]." He stated that "there never can be a convention...that shall bind my vote against my will on any question whatever." Garfield won the delegates over. Conkling did not take the defeat well and recognized Garfield's growing popularity by sending him a note that read, "New York requests that Ohio's real candidate and dark horse come forward."

Afterwards, the fight over credentials erupted into a free-for-all. After John A. Logan had barred anti-Grant delegates from the state convention earlier in the year, they had decided to file credential reports. At the meeting between Arthur and Chandler, both men had agreed that the credentials issue could be discussed at the convention. A Chicago lawyer who supported Grant, Emery Storrs interrupted the legal argument over credentials by mocking the Blaine campaigners. His remarks set off a barrage of comments from both the Blaine and Grant sides. The convention went out of control, as people started shouting and jumping throughout the convention hall. As Garfield commented, the convention "seemed [as if] it could not be in America, but in the Sections of Paris in the ecstasy of the Revolution." The fracas continued until 2:00 A.M. when acting chairman Green B. Raum, the United States Commissioner of Internal Revenue, banged the gavel to end the demonstration.

=== Presenting the nominees ===
On Saturday night, the alphabetical roll call of the states to present nominees was conducted. The first candidate for the Republican nomination emerged when the Michigan delegation was in roll call. James F. Joy, the seventy-year-old president of the Michigan Central Railroad, gave the speech nominating Blaine. Joy was not a practiced public speaker, and he stumbled and rushed through his nomination speech, "because we are all now impatient for the voting." Joy ended his speech by nominating "James S. Blaine" for the Republican ticket. Promptly, a number of delegates yelled back, "G! G. Blaine, you fool!" The delegates from the next state in the roll call, Minnesota, nominated Senator William Windom as their "favorite son" candidate. Nine states later, Roscoe Conkling of New York stepped up to the podium to present his nomination for Ulysses S. Grant.

And when asked what State he hails from,

Our sole reply shall be,
He hails from Appomattox,

And its famous apple tree. (Note: The "famous apple tree" refers to the place where Confederate General Robert E. Lee waited on April 9, 1865, to receive Grant's offer to finalize Confederate surrender terms in the village of Appomattox Court House, Virginia.)

The crowd of 15,000 responded by erupting in cheers. Conkling built up the crowd's energy with his speech, and then introduced his candidate by proclaiming, "New York is for Ulysses S. Grant. Never defeated–never defeated in peace or in war, his name is the most illustrious borne by living men." He later spoke of Grant's loyalty to the American people, and then scolded Grant's enemies who had brought up the third term issue. Conkling tried to show that Grant was an honest person who had won the delegates "without patronage and without emissaries, without committees, [and ] without bureaus...." After Conkling finished his speech, boos and hisses came from Blaine and Sherman backers, while applause was heard from Stalwart supporters of Grant. After North Carolina's roll call, the Ohio delegation brought out James Garfield to give the nomination speech for John Sherman.

Garfield had not written a speech, and was nervous about speaking in front of a large crowd. Before heading to Chicago, Sherman told Garfield that Garfield's speech should stress Sherman's "courageous persistence in any course he had adopted." Garfield started his speech by emphasizing his overwhelming pride for his role in the convention. Garfield then listed the qualities that a president should possess and stressed the importance of party unity. It wasn't until near his conclusion that he mentioned Sherman by name. Many reports of Garfield's speech describe it as enthusiastic, eloquent, and well received. Some accounts indicate that it was so well-received that it caused delegates to begin thinking of Garfield as a contender for the presidential nomination.

On the other hand, some members of the Sherman campaign were disappointed by Garfield's speech. One telegram to Sherman claimed that, "[Garfield] has been of no service to you...he was extremely lukewarm in his support." Rumors began to spread that Ohio Governor Charles Foster and Garfield, who were in adjoining suites at the Grand Pacific Hotel, were "conspiring to bring Garfield out as [a] candidate...." News of the finger-pointing within Sherman's camp had carried into newspapers across the country. The Albany Evening Journal reported that "[t]here is a general belief that the Ohio delegation is ready to desert Sherman and go over to Blaine in a body."

Although his popularity with delegates had grown after his speech, Garfield was upset over accusations that he was intriguing against Sherman, and worried about his future relationship with Sherman's inner circle. Garfield's close colleagues felt he was becoming too popular, too quickly. Friends including Lorenzo Coffin felt that his "time is not yet." Garfield heeded the advice of his friends to lower his convention profile, but he had already made a positive impression on delegates. Late on Sunday June 6, Benjamin Harrison, the leader of Indiana's delegation, visited Garfield at his hotel to inquire about his conditions for accepting the nomination. Garfield replied that he had come to the convention to support Sherman, so Harrison should not introduce Garfield as a candidate.

=== Balloting ===
At ten o'clock on Monday morning, convention chairman Hoar banged his gavel to open the convention. Eugene Hale moved to immediately proceed to the presidential nominee balloting, and Roscoe Conkling seconded the motion. Newspapers had predicted the results of the balloting, and the delegates knew that it would take a number of ballots before a victor could be found. The first surprise during the balloting roll call came when John A. Logan of Illinois announced that of his state's forty-two delegates, only twenty-four were in support of Grant. This was not as "solid" as Logan had previously advertised to the rest of the Grant backers. New York faced a similar situation. Of its seventy delegates, fifty-one supported Grant, seventeen were for Blaine, and the remaining two supported Sherman. Pennsylvania fared even worse, as only thirty-two of the state's fifty-eight delegates put in their support for Grant.

After all the states were polled, the results were tabulated. Grant received 304 votes, Blaine had 284, Sherman had 93, Senator George F. Edmunds received 34, Elihu B. Washburne, who had served as the United States Ambassador to France under President Grant, had 30, and Minnesota senator William Windom received 10. Of the states represented by the "triumvirate", sixty delegates did not support Grant. None of the candidates were close to the 379 needed to secure the nomination, so the balloting continued throughout the day.

In Washington, D.C., both Blaine and Sherman were disappointed by their first-ballot vote totals. Blaine had been told that he should expect around 300 first-ballot votes, but his actual total fell sixteen short, and it was also one vote fewer than the total he received on the first ballot at the 1876 Convention. Sherman was told to expect 110 votes, which was significantly lower than the expected totals for Blaine and Grant. However, Sherman felt his chance would come later, when the Grant vote split apart. After Sherman heard his first-ballot vote totals, he grew visibly angry that "some of them [the votes] were taken away from him before the ballot began." He was upset that nine Ohio delegates bolted from Sherman and voted for Blaine. Sherman blamed Blaine for causing the defection "by [methods of] falsehood, ridicule and treachery." In Galena, Illinois, Grant did not express any emotions after being told about the first-ballot vote totals. As one newsman reported, "[t]he silent soldier was smoking his cigar with all his usual serenity." Grant's wife, Julia, expected a deadlock, and suggested to her husband that he surprise the delegates in Chicago with a visit. Grant thought this was unwise because it gave an appearance of bad luck and bad manners. Despite his wife's attempts to change his mind, Grant remained adamant.

Meanwhile, the delegates at the convention continued to cast ballots until a victor could be determined. On the second ballot of the day, Pennsylvania delegate W. A. Grier cast a vote for James Garfield. However, the Garfield support remained with that one delegate's vote for most of the day. The delegates cast eighteen ballots before taking a recess for dinner. After dinner, they came back and cast ten more ballots. Still, no candidate was close to the 379 votes needed to win. After twelve hours of balloting, Massachusetts delegate William Lovering moved to adjourn for the night. A few Grant delegates objected, but the motion to adjourn was passed by a vote of 446 to 308. After twenty-eight ballots, Grant had 307 votes, Blaine had 279 and Sherman had 91, and the rest of the votes were split between favorite son candidates including Windom and Edmunds.

Suggestions for introducing a "dark horse" candidate began to take place. Members backing each major candidate were still determined to win the nomination, but some delegates felt the deadlock could not be broken unless new candidates were introduced. Backers for Sherman and Blaine met after the convention was adjourned. Chandler laid down his terms. Blaine had nearly 300 votes, and could not simply withdraw. As Chandler explained, even "[i]f Mr. Blaine permits his column to be broken, [then] Iowa, Nebraska, Kansas, Nevada, California, Oregon & twelve votes in the Territories will go to Grant...[as would] Mr. Blaine's Southern votes." Both sides argued until two or three in the morning, but no decision had been reached. Grant leaders had also met that night in Roscoe Conkling's suite in the Grand Pacific Hotel. They discussed the imposing dangers of Grant's nomination bid, such as the third-term resistors. Many speculated that Grant was not going to receive the nomination. The Grant backers discussed the other two chief candidates, and found them both to be unacceptable. Some of the men called for Conkling himself as a substitute for Grant. They argued that with Grant out of the race, Conkling would face little resistance for the Republican nomination. However, Conkling refused, saying "[even] if I were to receive every other vote in the Convention, my own would still be lacking, and that I would not give. I am here as the agent of New York to support General Grant to the end. Any man who would forsake him under such conditions does not deserve to be elected, and could not be elected."

The first ballot on Tuesday morning, June 8, saw two major breaks in the voting. Massachusetts switched their twenty-one votes from Edmunds to Sherman, spiking Sherman's total to 116, the highest thus far. Chandler also convinced three Minnesota delegates to switch their support from Windom to Blaine. By the thirty-second ballot, Blaine had dropped six votes from the night before, and Grant had increased his total to 309. Despite the relatively small changes, Conkling confidently claimed that the "[m]embers of the N.Y. Delegation assert that Grant will be nominated before one o'clock." On the thirty-third ballot, nine Wisconsin delegates shifted their support from Grant to Washburne. On the next ballot, sixteen of twenty Wisconsin delegates changed their votes to Garfield. Garfield immediately called to Hoar to raise a point of order. Garfield "challenge[d] the correctness of the announcement", claiming that without his consent, he should not be receiving votes. Hoar dismissed Garfield's question, claiming later that he denied Garfield because he did not want to see a presidency undone by a simple point of order, meaning he did not want Garfield to stop the momentum for his own candidacy. At this point the vote totals for the major candidates stood at 312 for Grant, 275 for Blaine, 107 for Sherman, and 17 for Garfield. Then, during the thirty-fifth ballot roll call, Indiana shifted all 27 of its votes (mostly from the Blaine column) to Garfield. Four Maryland delegates and one delegate each from Mississippi and North Carolina also switched their votes to Garfield, bringing his total to 50.

Blaine, seeing that his chances for winning the nomination were slipping, concluded that Garfield was the most suitable alternative. Garfield was a close friend, and Blaine felt that by supporting Garfield, he could defeat Grant and Conkling and possibly receive an appointment in Garfield's administration. Similarly, Sherman, acting upon advice from his colleagues, decided to shift all his support to Garfield, to "save the Republican Party." Both candidates told their supporters to support Garfield.

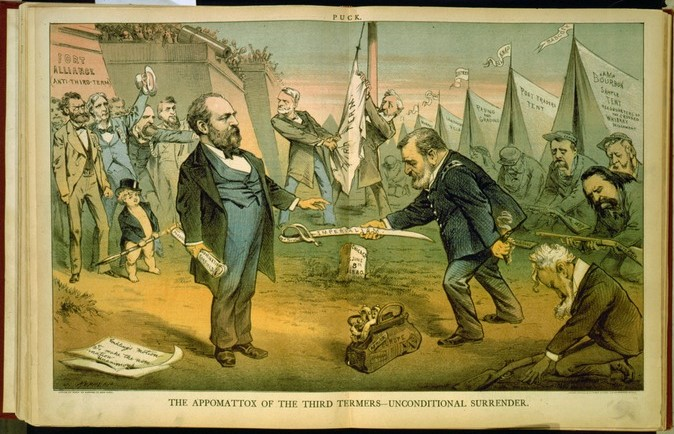
A satirical Puck cartoon depicting Ulysses S. Grant surrendering to James A. Garfield after losing the 1880 Republican presidential nomination to him.

With the Blaine and Sherman forces now rallying to Garfield, the movement became a stampede on the next ballot, the convention's thirty-sixth. Garfield won 399 votes, 93 more than Grant, putting him over the top and giving him the Republican nomination. Blaine finished with 42, Washburne had 5, John Sherman had 3, and the remaining were split amongst other minor candidates. Garfield was so overwhelmed with emotion after winning the nomination that an Inter Ocean reporter noted that he looked "pale as death, and seemed to be half-unconsciously to receive the congratulations of his friends," and various sources also claim that he went back to his hotel room post-convention and cried. The convention was in a mad frenzy as thousands of people chanted for Garfield, and later joined in the singing of the Battle Cry of Freedom. Grant followers, like Conkling, looked on with "glum faces" and made "no effort to conceal their disappointment." Conkling took great pride in the 306 delegates who had supported Grant throughout the entire balloting. With the Grant supporters, Conkling formed a "Three Hundred and Six Guard" society. The society held annual dinners, and even drew up a commemorative coin with the inscription, "The Old Guard".

Afterwards, Hoar banged his gavel and announced, "James A. Garfield, of Ohio, is nominated for President of the United States." Garfield wrote a letter to his wife stating that "if the results meet your approval, I shall be content." Garfield's wife, Lucretia, was thrilled with her husband's nomination and gave her approval. (Garfield subsequently resigned the Senate seat to which he had been elected for the term beginning in 1881, and the Ohio Legislature then elected Sherman.)

Garfield and the Ohio delegation desired a New York Stalwart as Garfield's vice presidential running mate, partly to placate Conkling, and partly to balance the ticket geographically. Levi P. Morton declined after consulting with Conkling, who was still unhappy over Grant's loss and advised Morton not to accept. The nomination was then offered (surreptitiously, and without consulting Garfield) to Chester A. Arthur, who had close Stalwart ties to Conkling, but who had impressed delegates with his work to broker the compromise on the selection of a convention chairman. Conkling tried to talk Arthur out of accepting, urging him to "drop it as you would a red hot shoe from the forge," but Arthur insisted that he would accept the nomination, calling the Vice Presidency "a greater honor than I ever dreamed of attaining." Arthur won the nomination after he received 468 votes, next to 193 for Washburne, and 44 for Jewell. Former Governor Edmund J. Davis of Texas and several others were also considered, but received little delegate support. After Hoar banged his gavel at 7:25 P.M. on June 8, the longest ever Republican National Convention was adjourned.

Presidential Balloting
Candidate	1st	2nd	3rd	4th	5th	6th	7th	8th	9th	10th	11th	12th	13th	14th	15th	16th	17th	18th	19th	20th
Garfield	0	1	1	1	1	2	2	1	2	2	2	1	1	0	0	0	0	0	1	1
Grant	304	305	305	305	305	305	305	306	308	305	305	304	305	305	309	306	303	305	305	308
Blaine	284	282	282	281	281	280	281	284	282	282	281	283	285	285	281	283	284	283	279	276
Sherman	93	94	93	95	95	95	94	91	90	92	93	92	89	89	88	88	90	91	96	93
Washburne	30	31	31	31	31	31	31	32	32	32	32	33	33	35	36	36	36	35	32	35
Edmunds	34	32	32	32	32	32	32	31	31	31	31	31	31	31	31	31	31	31	31	31
Windom	10	10	10	10	10	10	10	10	10	10	10	10	10	10	10	10	10	10	10	10
Davis	0	0	0	0	0	0	0	0	0	0	0	0	0	0	0	0	1	0	0	0
Harrison	0	0	1	0	0	0	0	0	0	0	0	0	0	0	0	0	0	0	0	0
Hartranft	0	0	0	0	0	0	0	0	0	0	0	0	0	0	0	0	0	0	1	1
Hayes	0	0	0	0	0	0	0	0	0	1	1	1	0	0	0	0	0	0	0	0
McCrary	0	0	0	0	0	0	0	0	0	0	0	0	1	0	0	0	0	0	0	0
Not Voting	1	1	1	1	1	1	1	1	1	1	1	1	1	1	1	2	1	1	1	1

Presidential Balloting
Candidate	21st	22nd	23rd	24th	25th	26th	27th	28th	29th	30th	31st	32nd	33rd	34th	35th	36th
Garfield	1	1	2	2	2	2	2	2	2	2	1	1	1	17	50	399
Grant	305	305	304	305	302	303	306	307	305	306	308	309	309	312	313	306
Blaine	276	275	275	279	281	280	277	279	278	279	276	270	276	275	257	42
Sherman	96	97	97	93	94	93	93	91	116	120	118	117	110	107	99	3
Washburne	35	35	36	35	35	36	36	35	35	33	37	44	44	30	23	5
Edmunds	31	31	31	31	31	31	31	31	12	11	11	11	11	11	11	0
Windom	10	10	10	10	10	10	10	10	7	4	3	3	4	4	3	0
Conkling	0	0	0	0	0	0	0	0	0	0	1	0	0	0	0	0
Hartranft	1	1	0	0	0	0	0	0	0	0	0	0	0	0	0	0
Sheridan	0	0	0	0	0	0	0	0	0	1	0	0	0	0	0	0
Not Voting	1	1	1	1	1	1	1	1	1	0	1	1	1	0	0	1

Presidential Balloting / 5th Day of Convention (June 7, 1880)

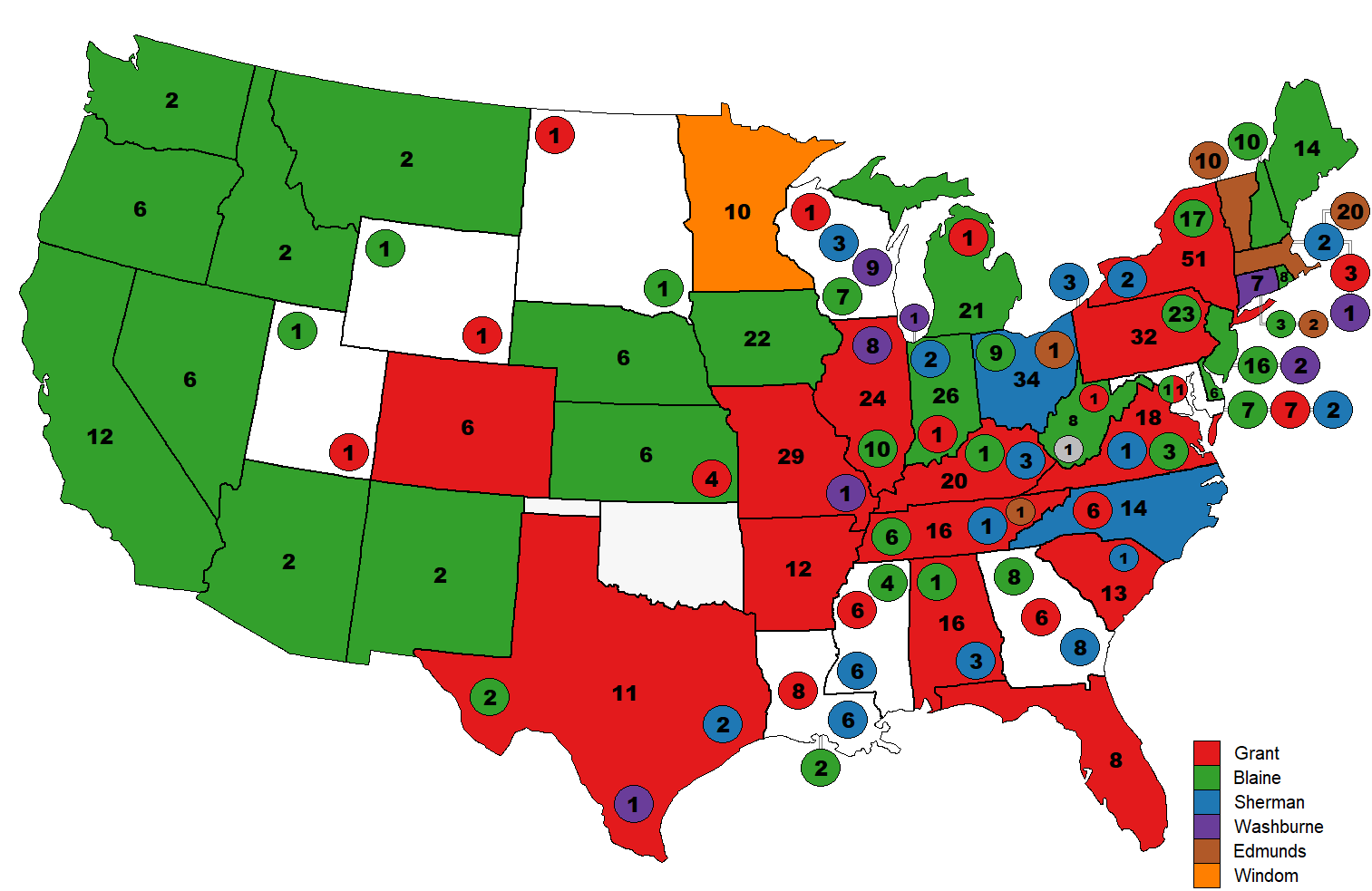
1st Presidential Ballot

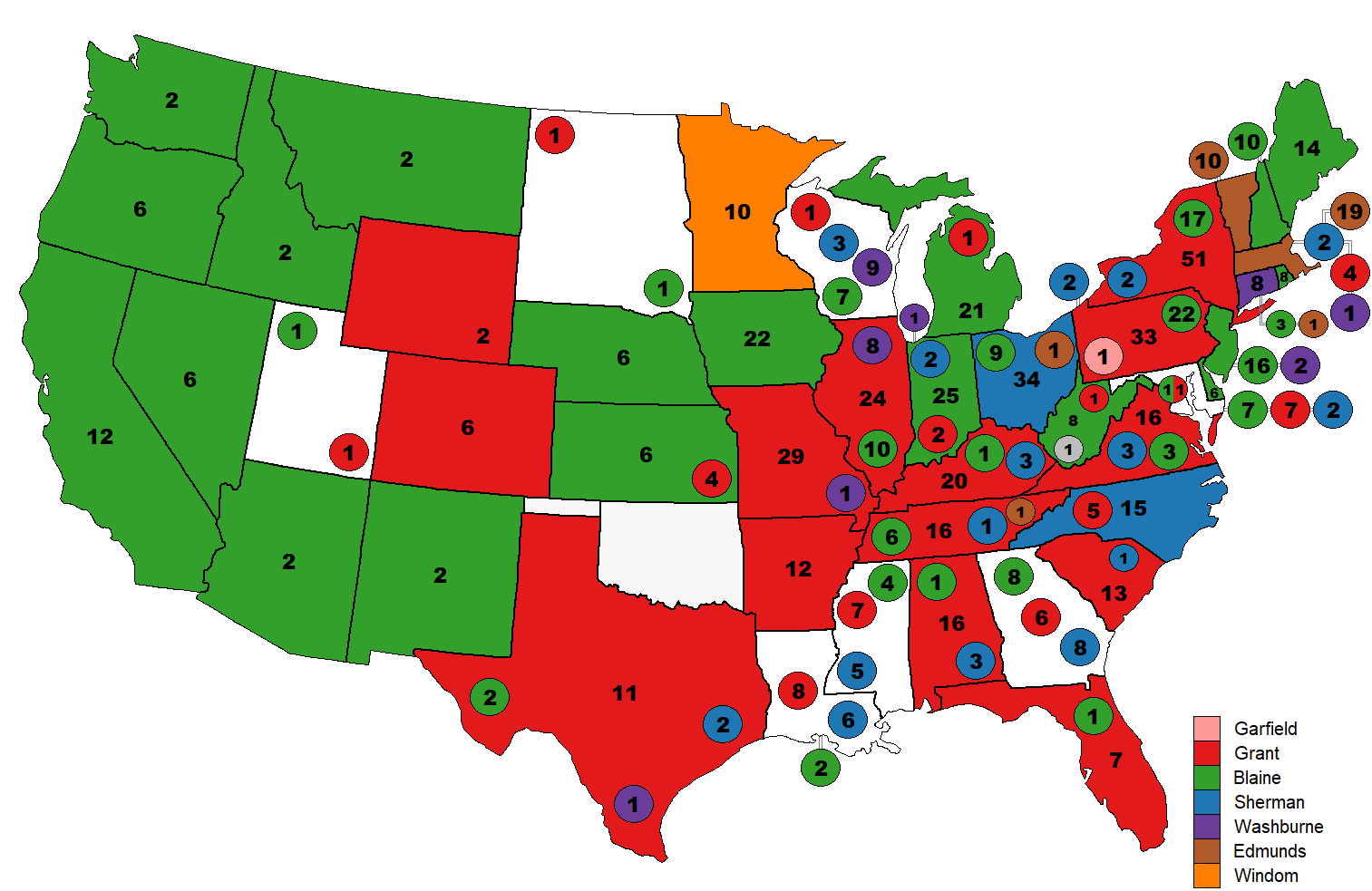
2nd Presidential Ballot

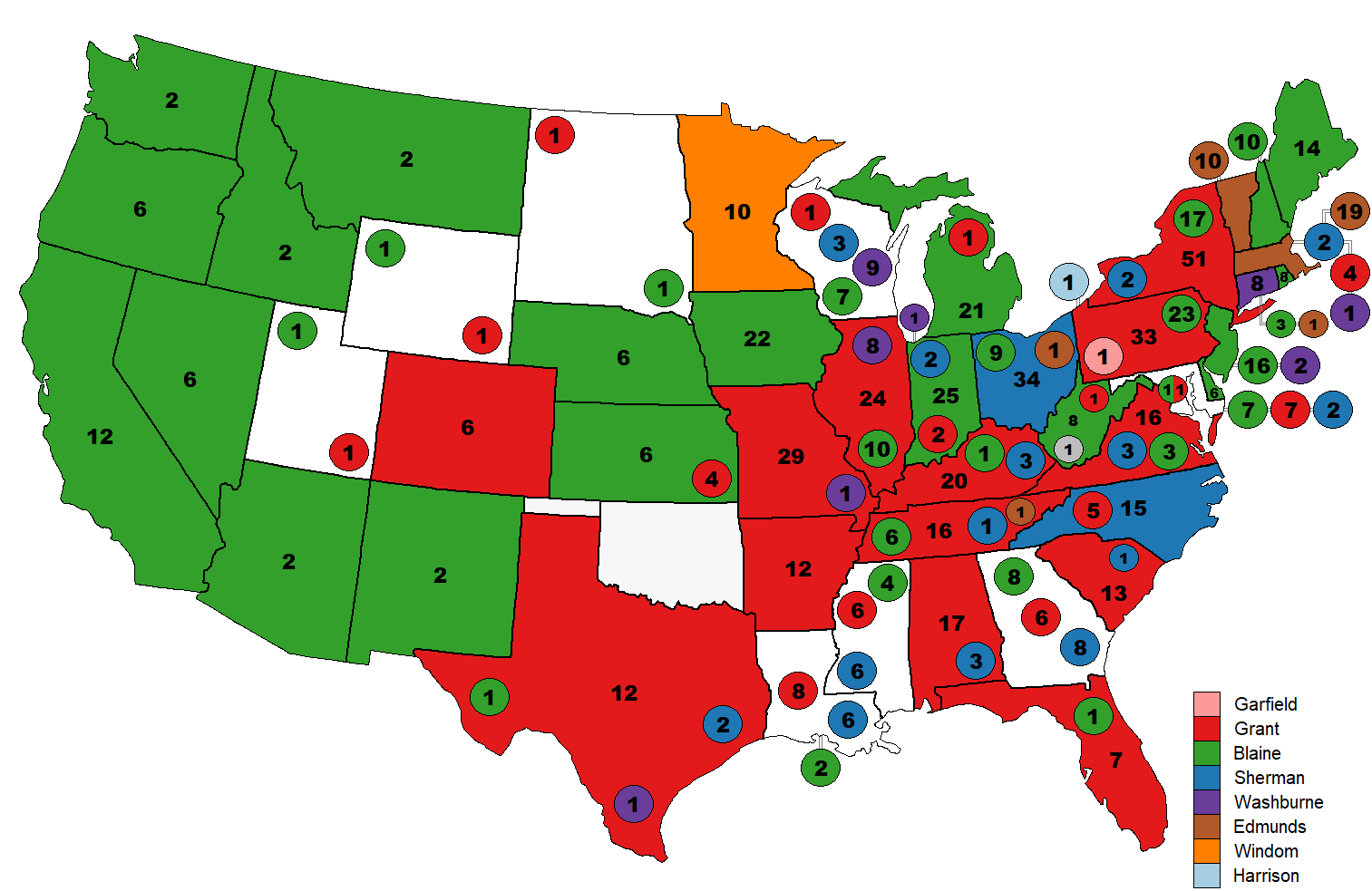
3rd Presidential Ballot

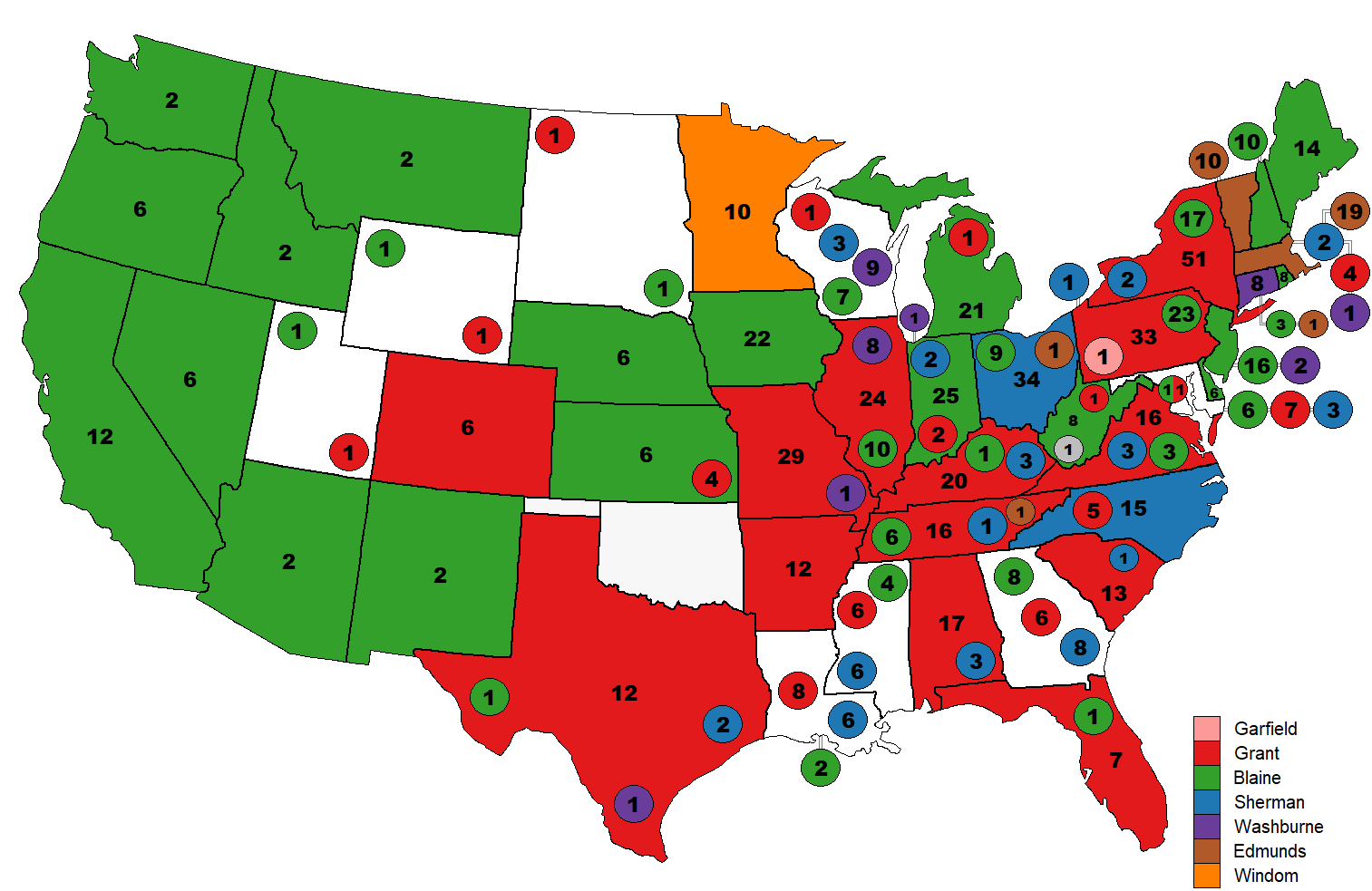
4th Presidential Ballot

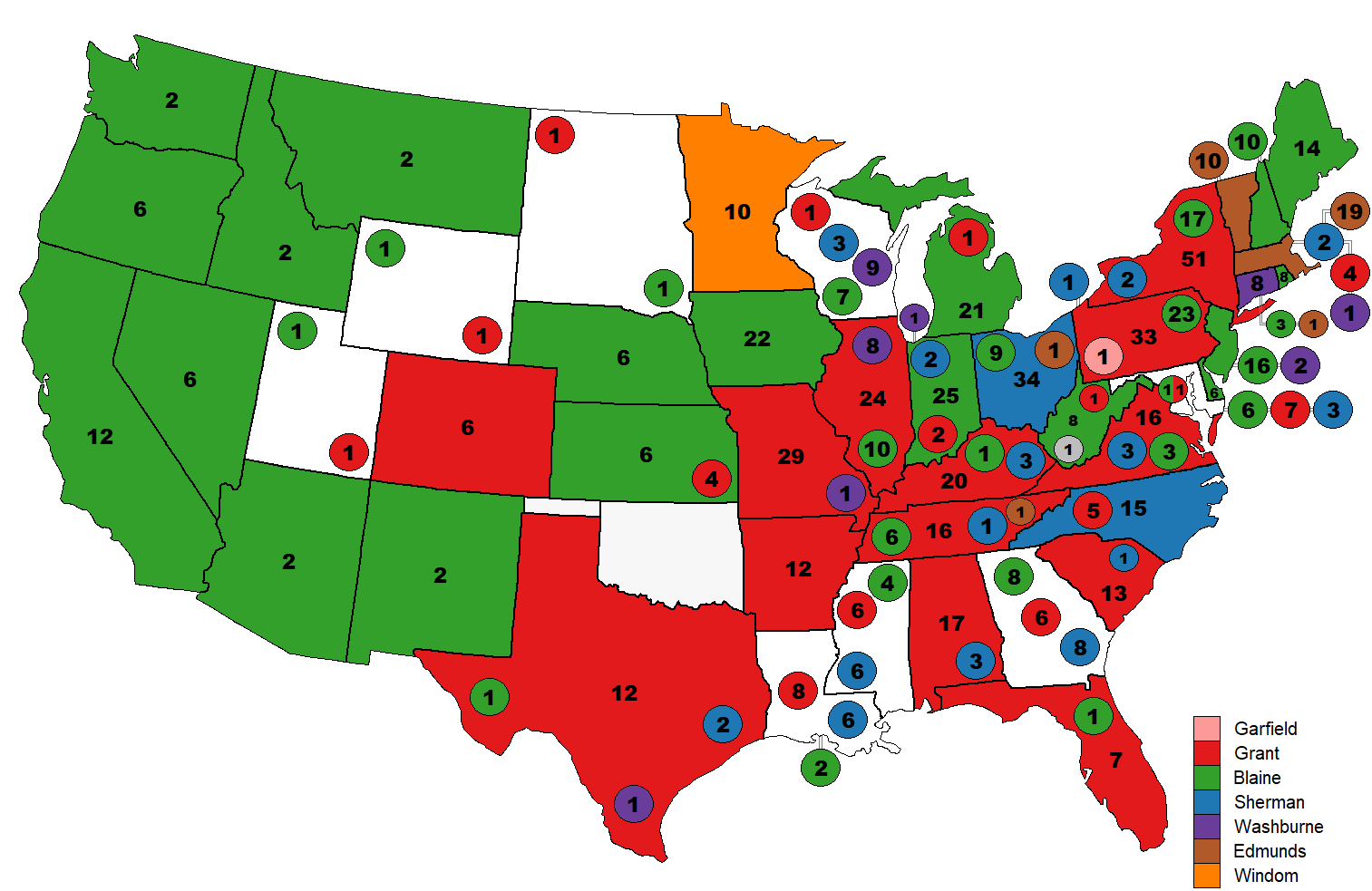
5th Presidential Ballot

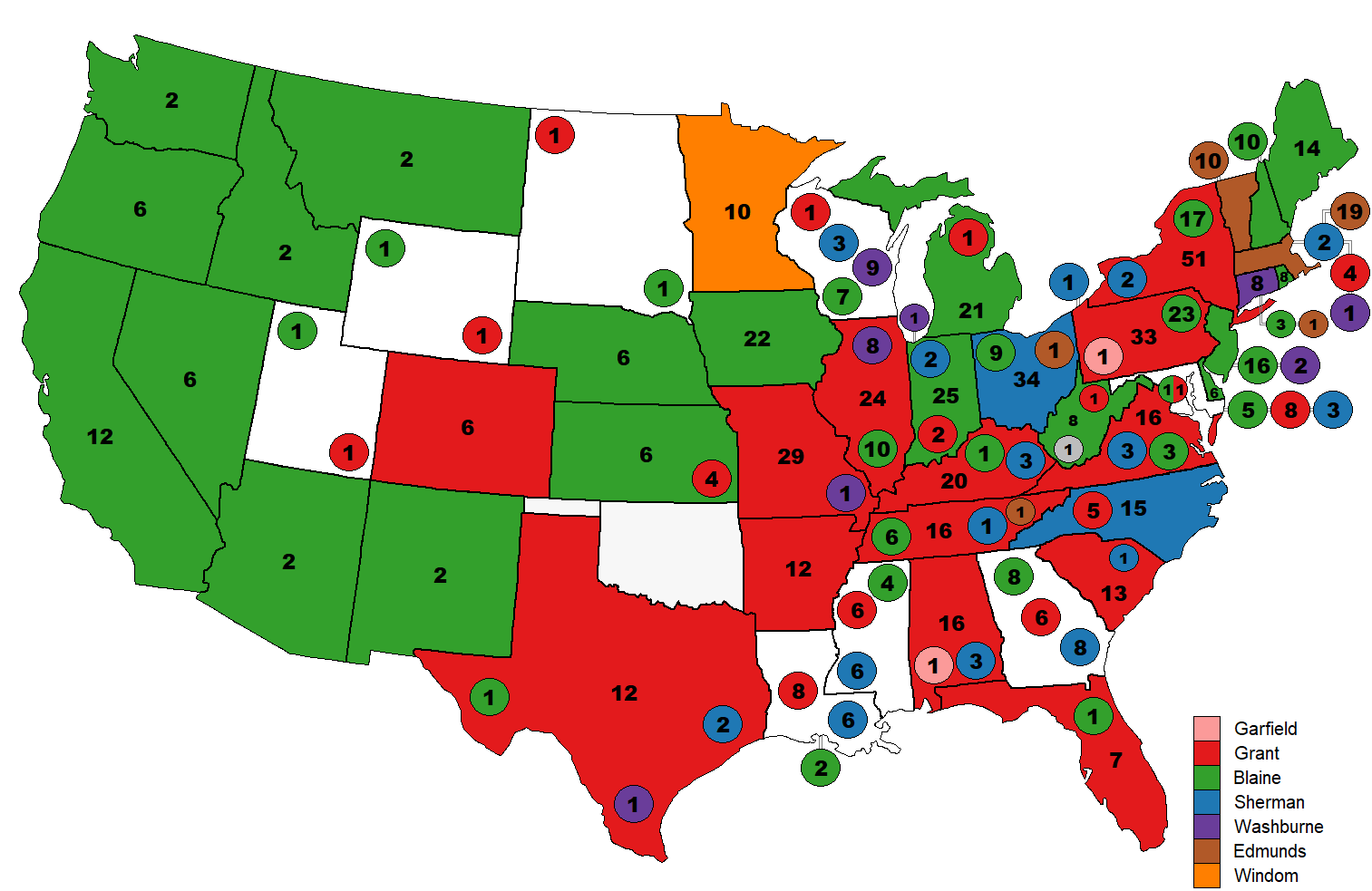
6th Presidential Ballot

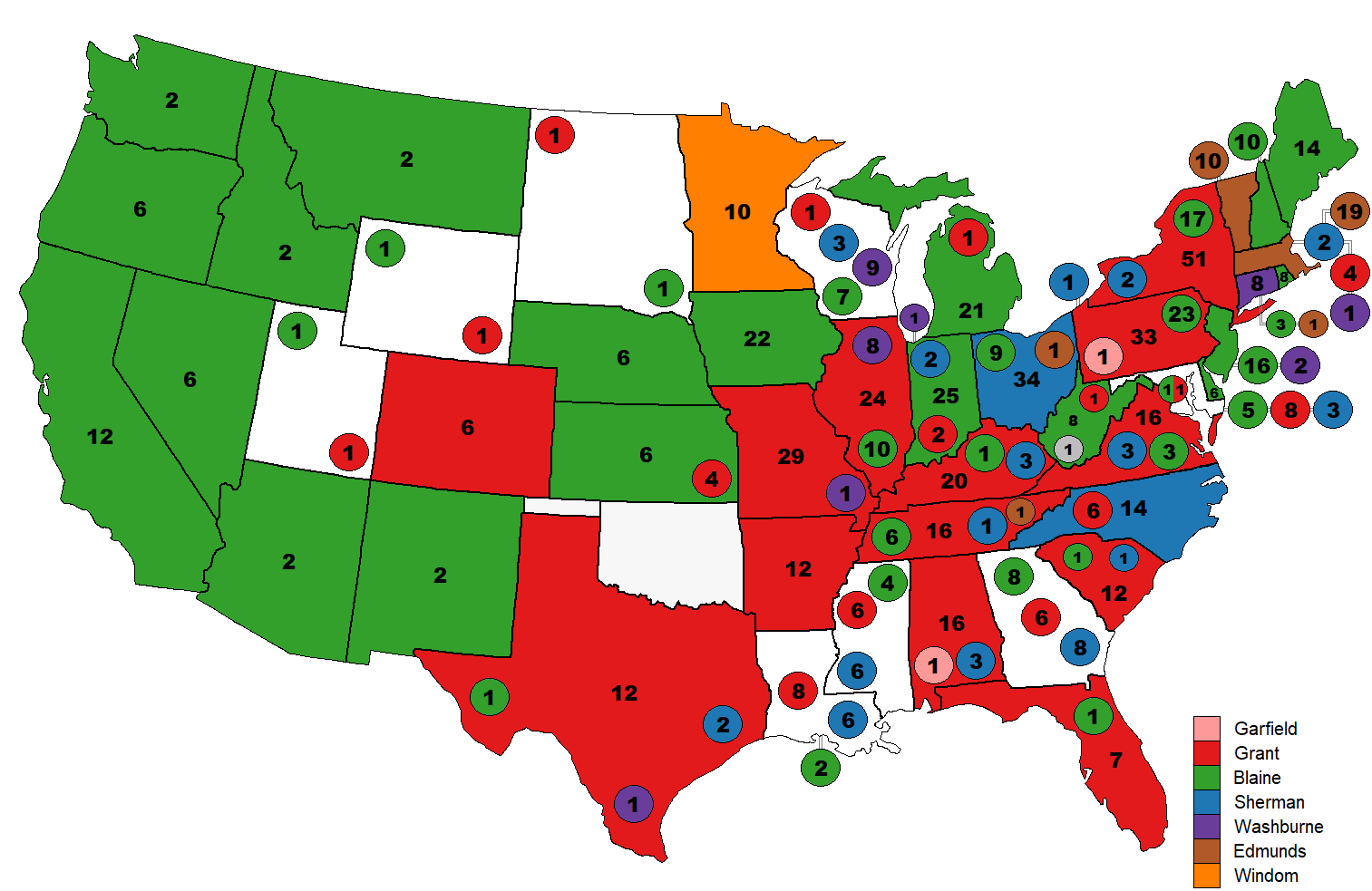
7th Presidential Ballot

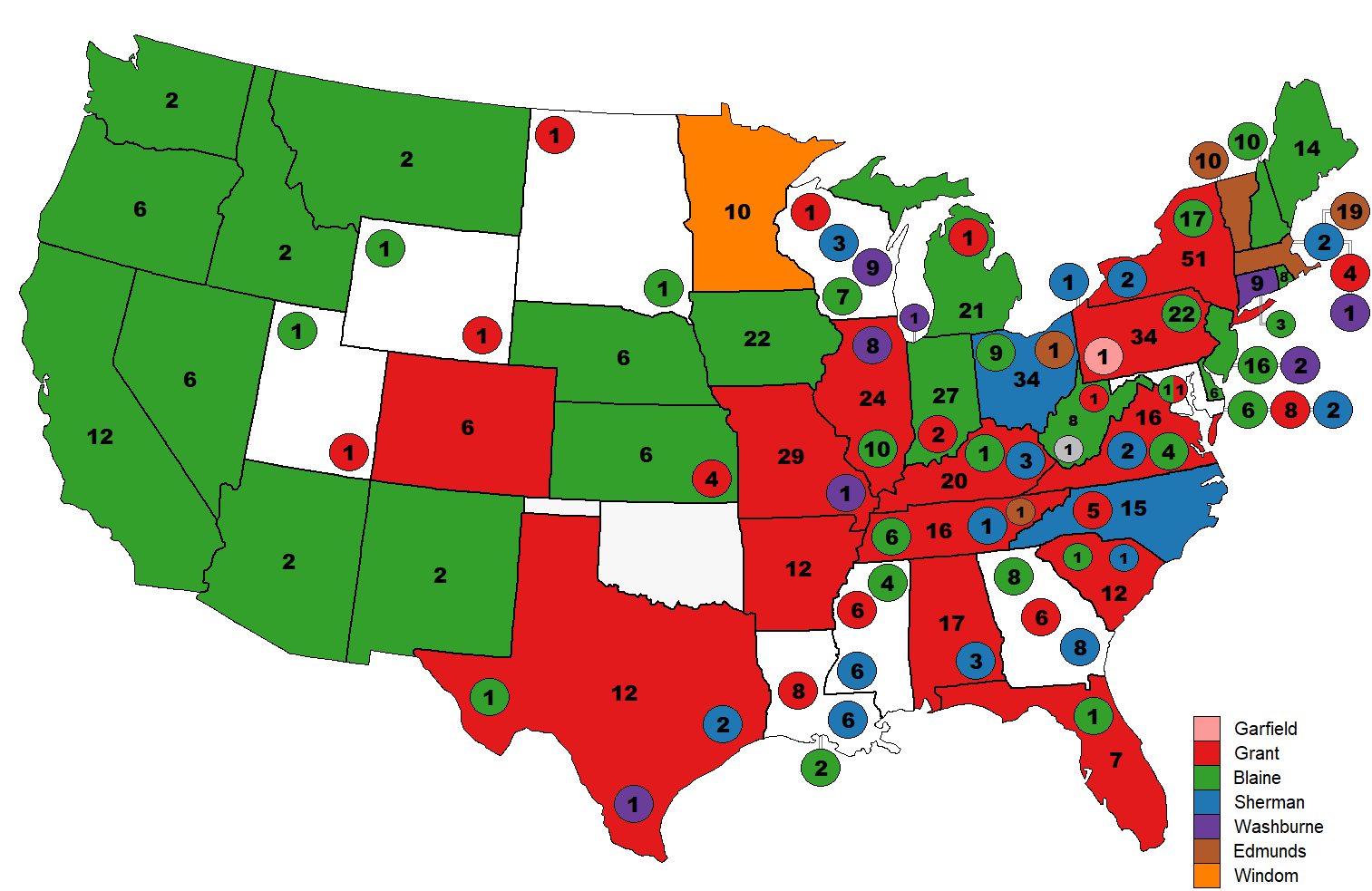
8th Presidential Ballot

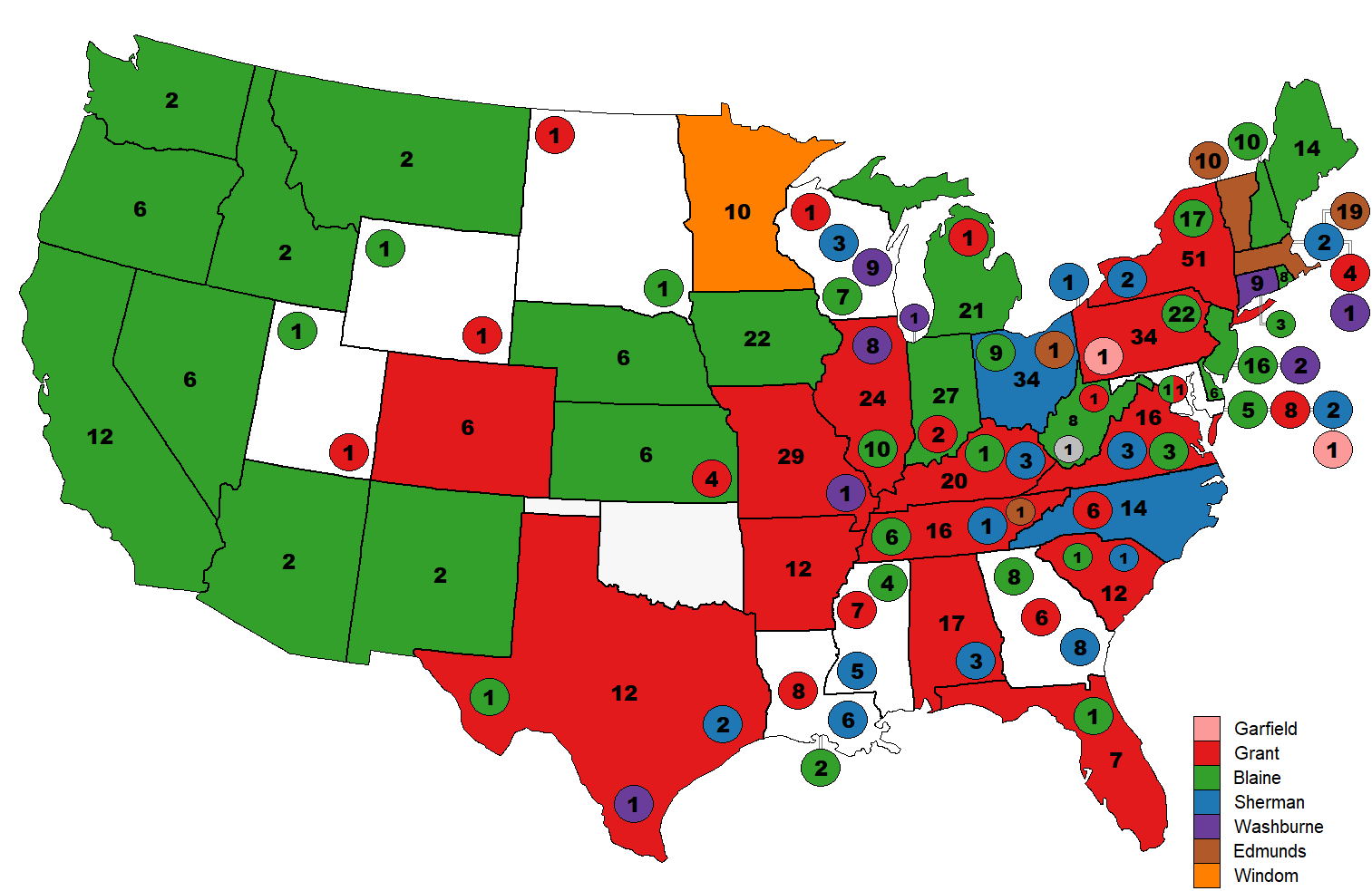
9th Presidential Ballot

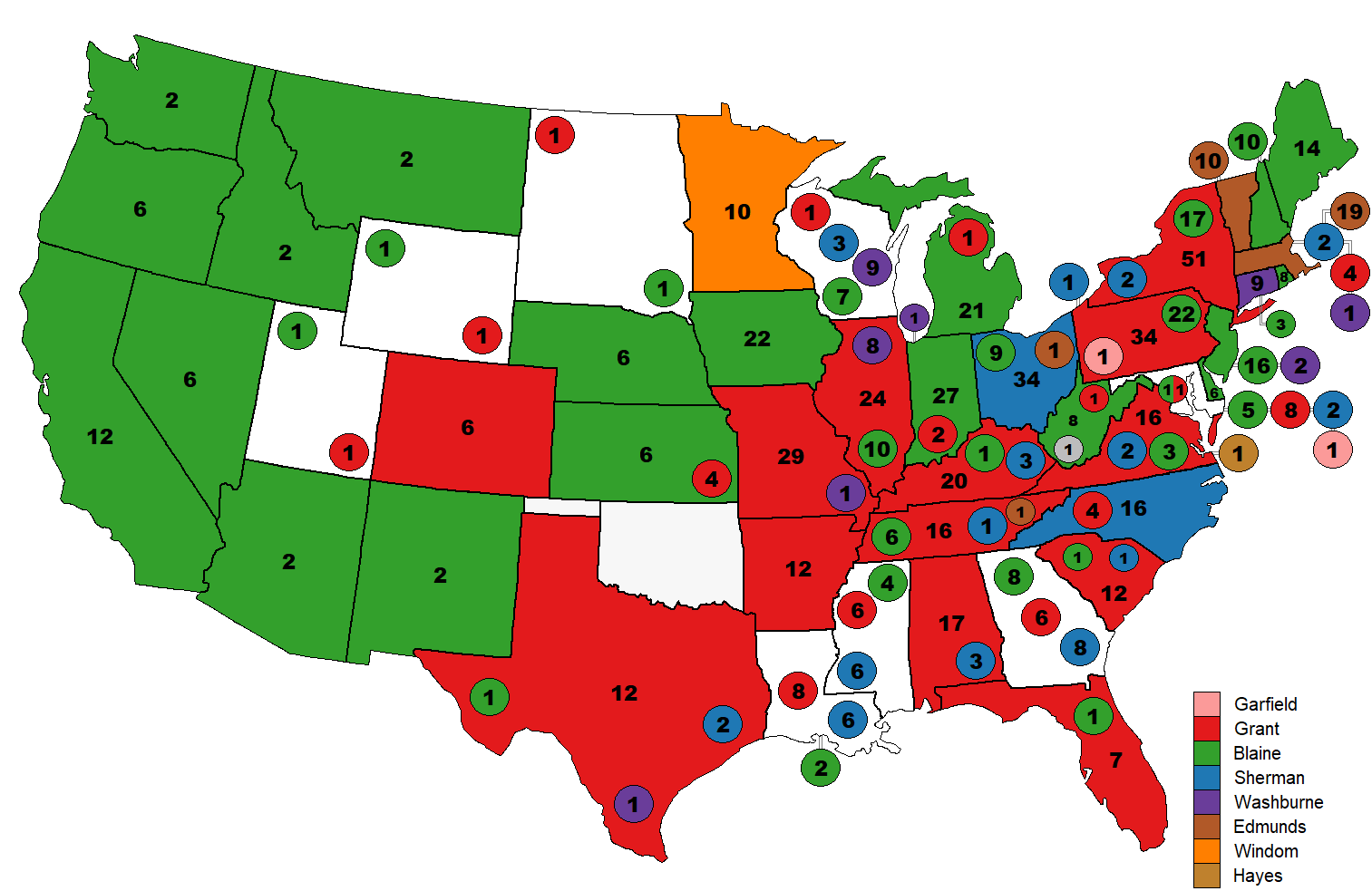
10th Presidential Ballot

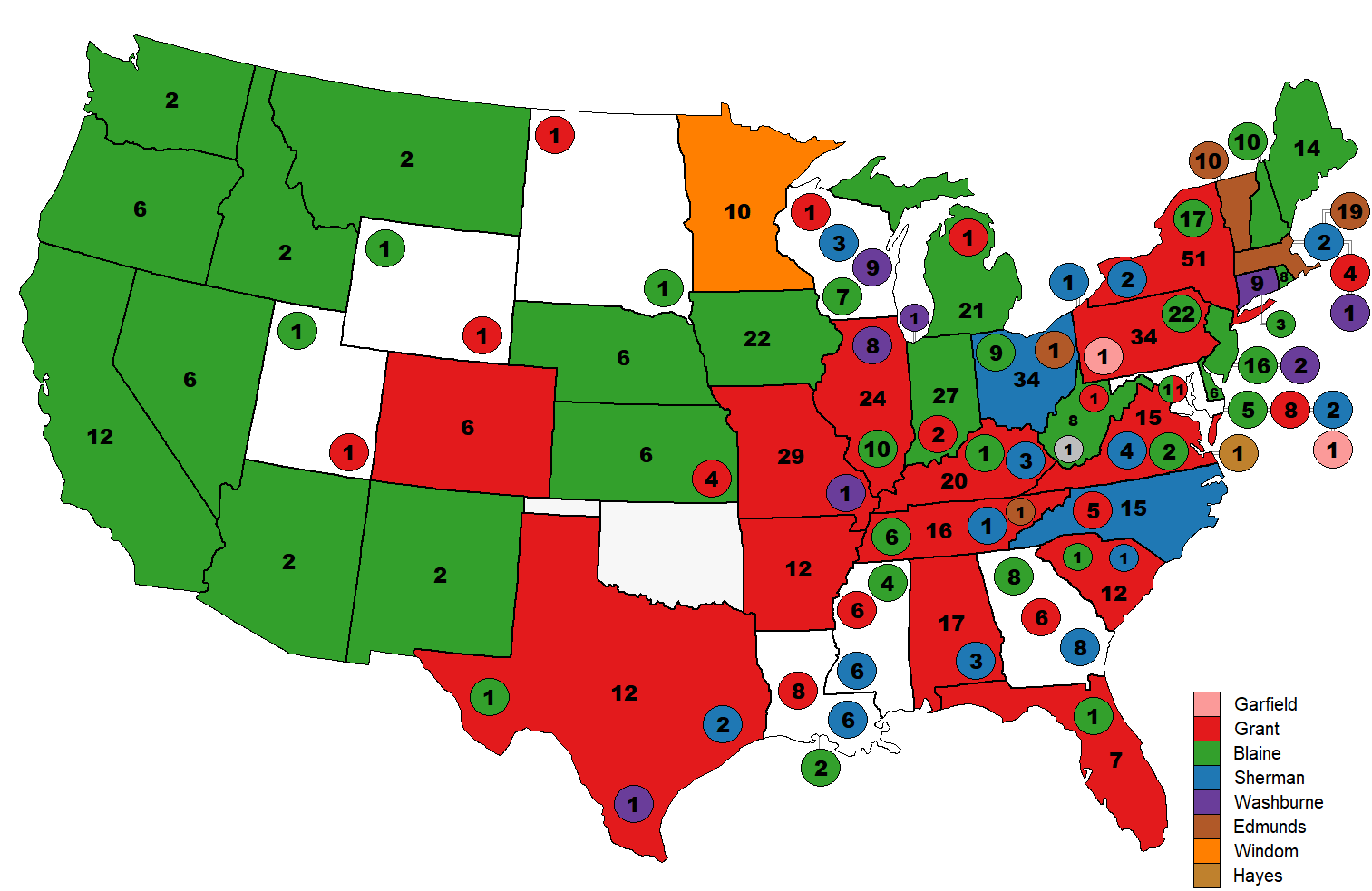
11th Presidential Ballot

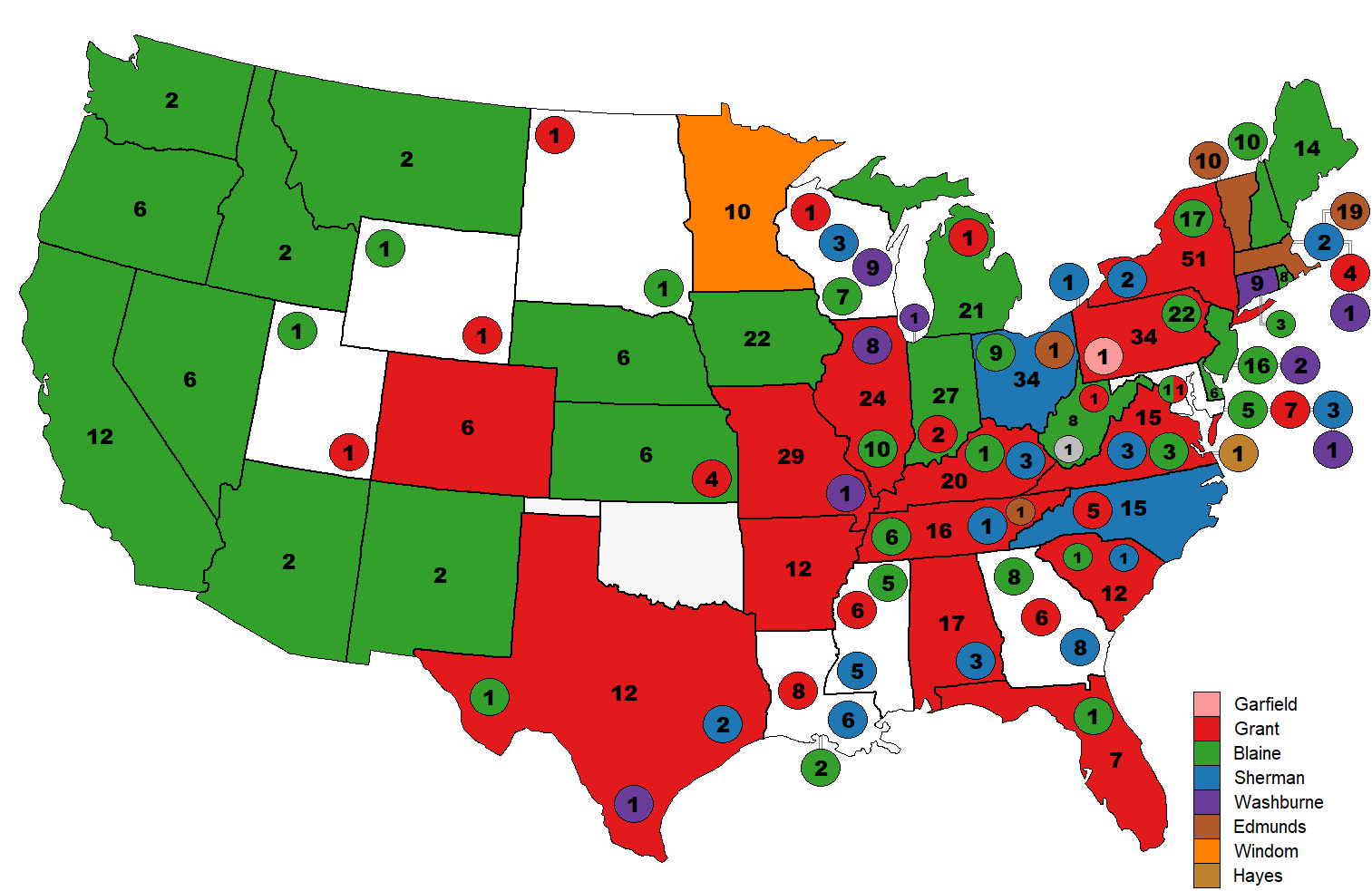
12th Presidential Ballot

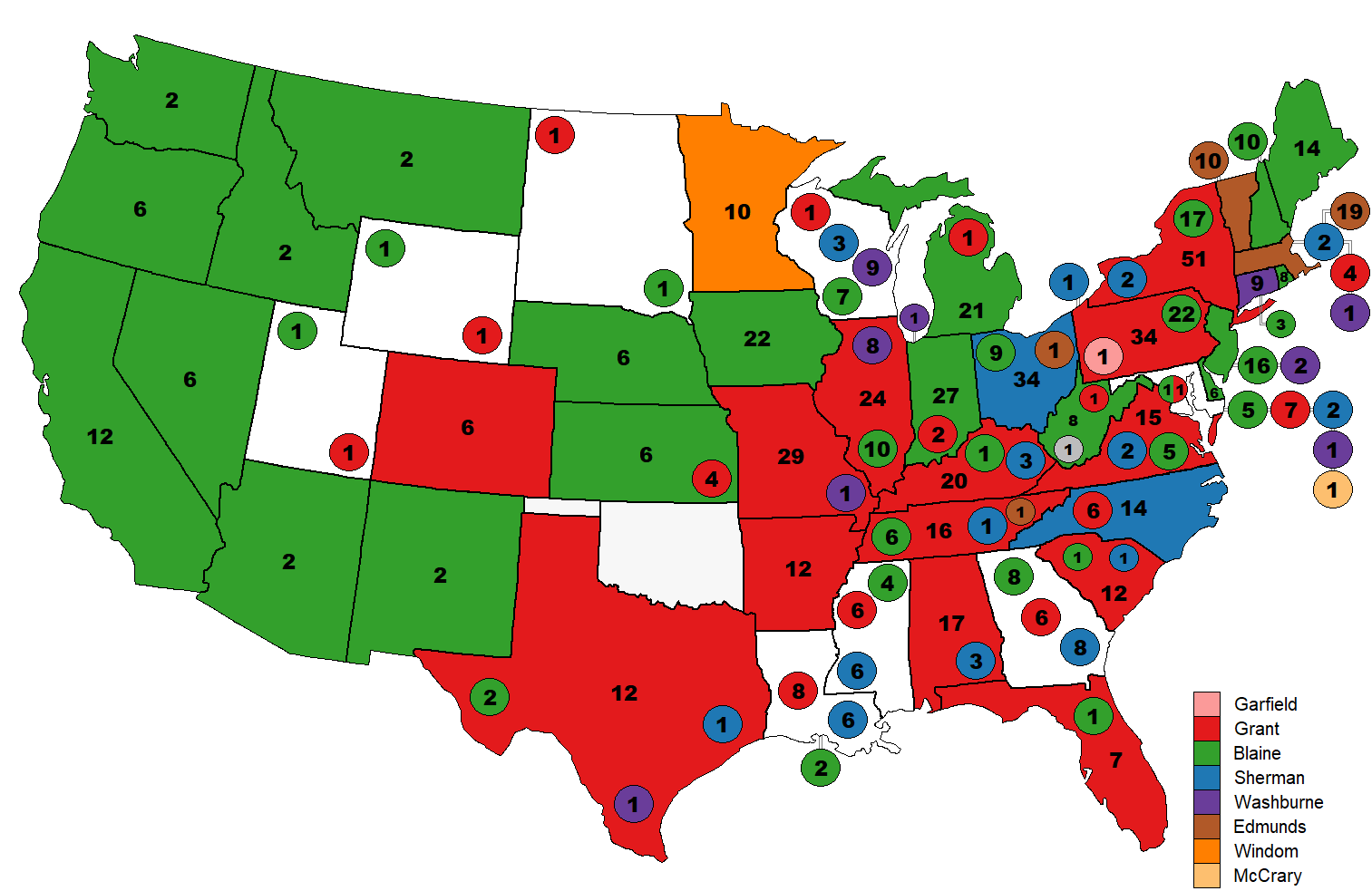
13th Presidential Ballot

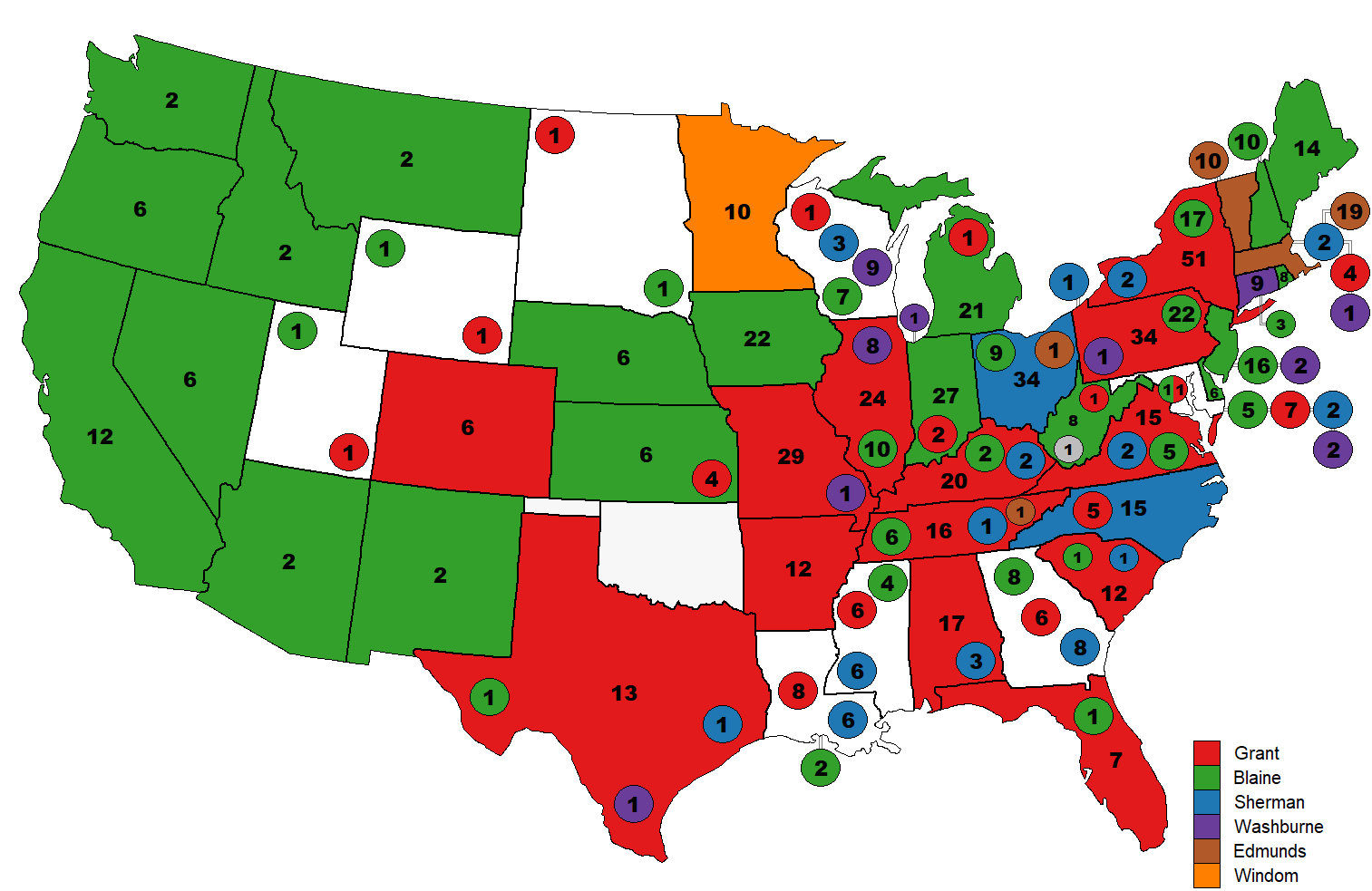
14th Presidential Ballot

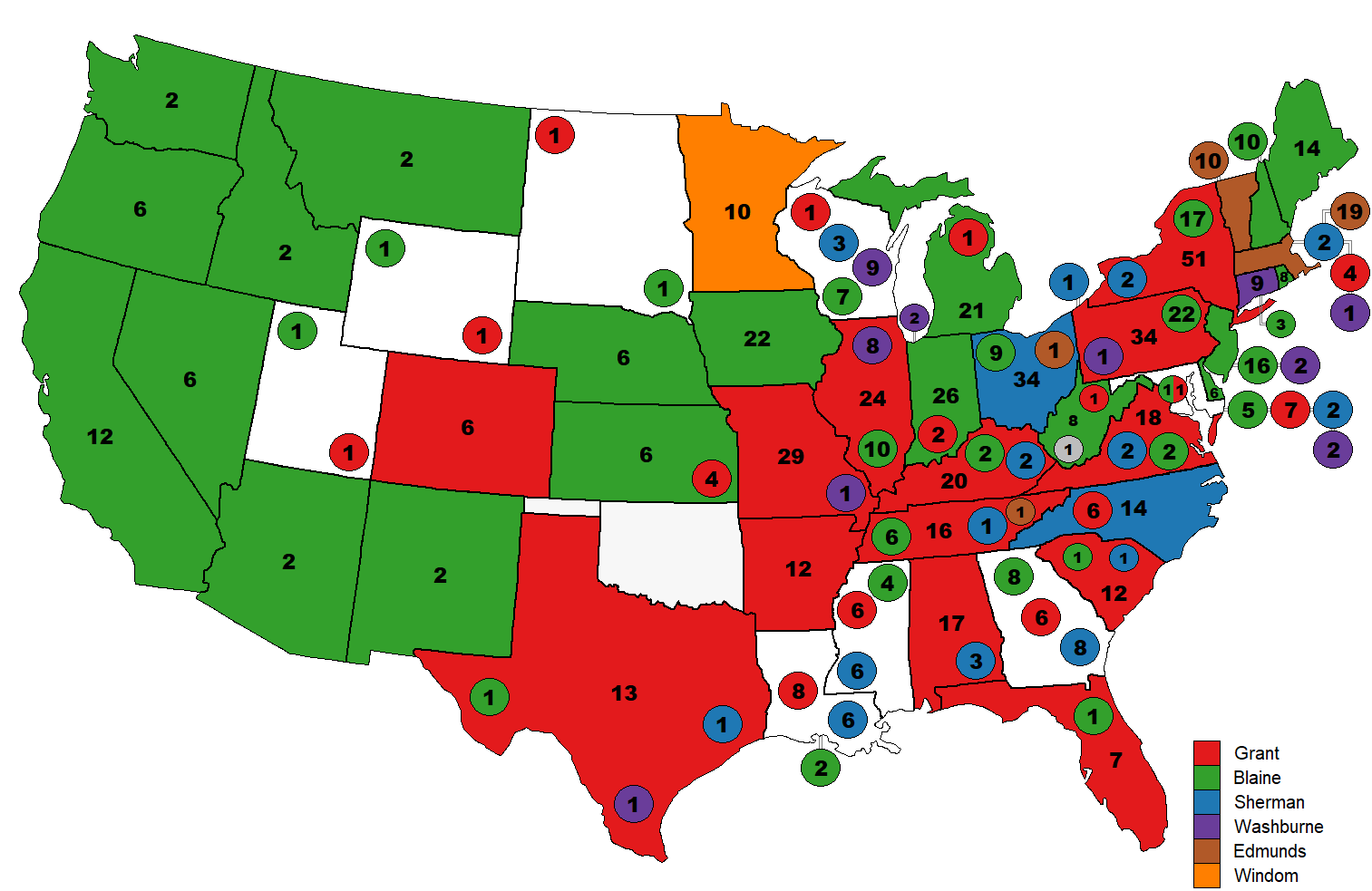
15th Presidential Ballot

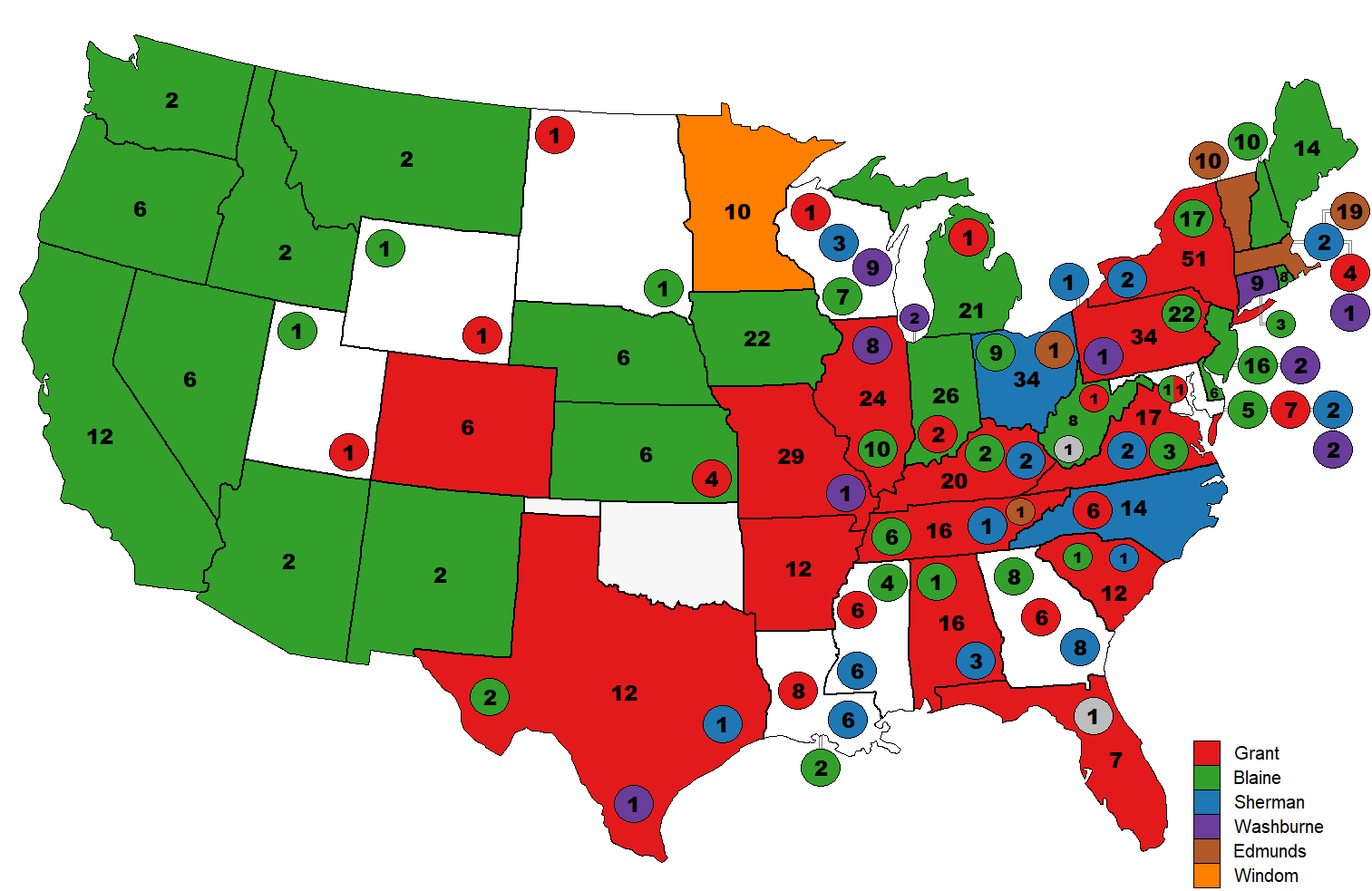
16th Presidential Ballot

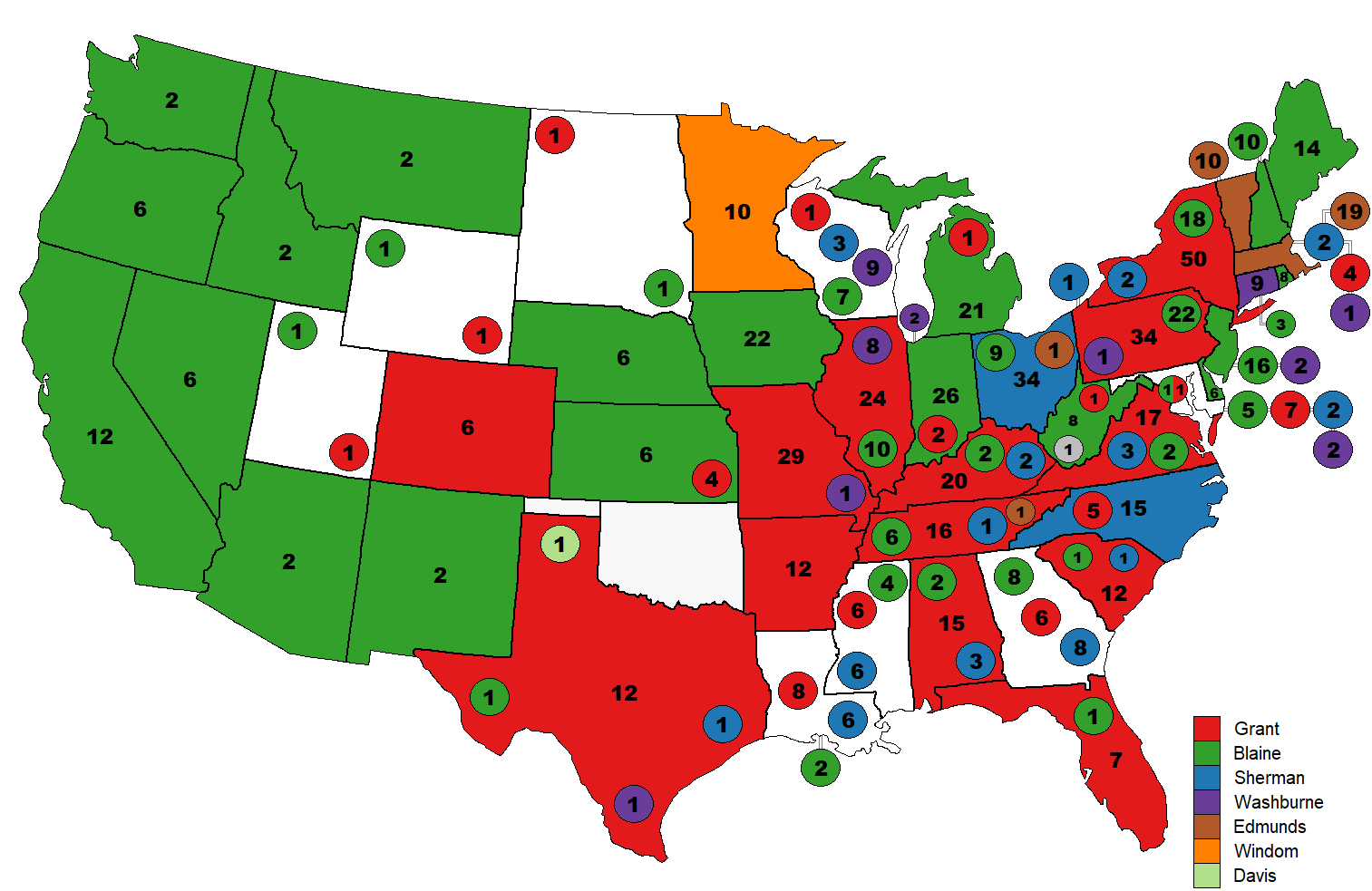
17th Presidential Ballot

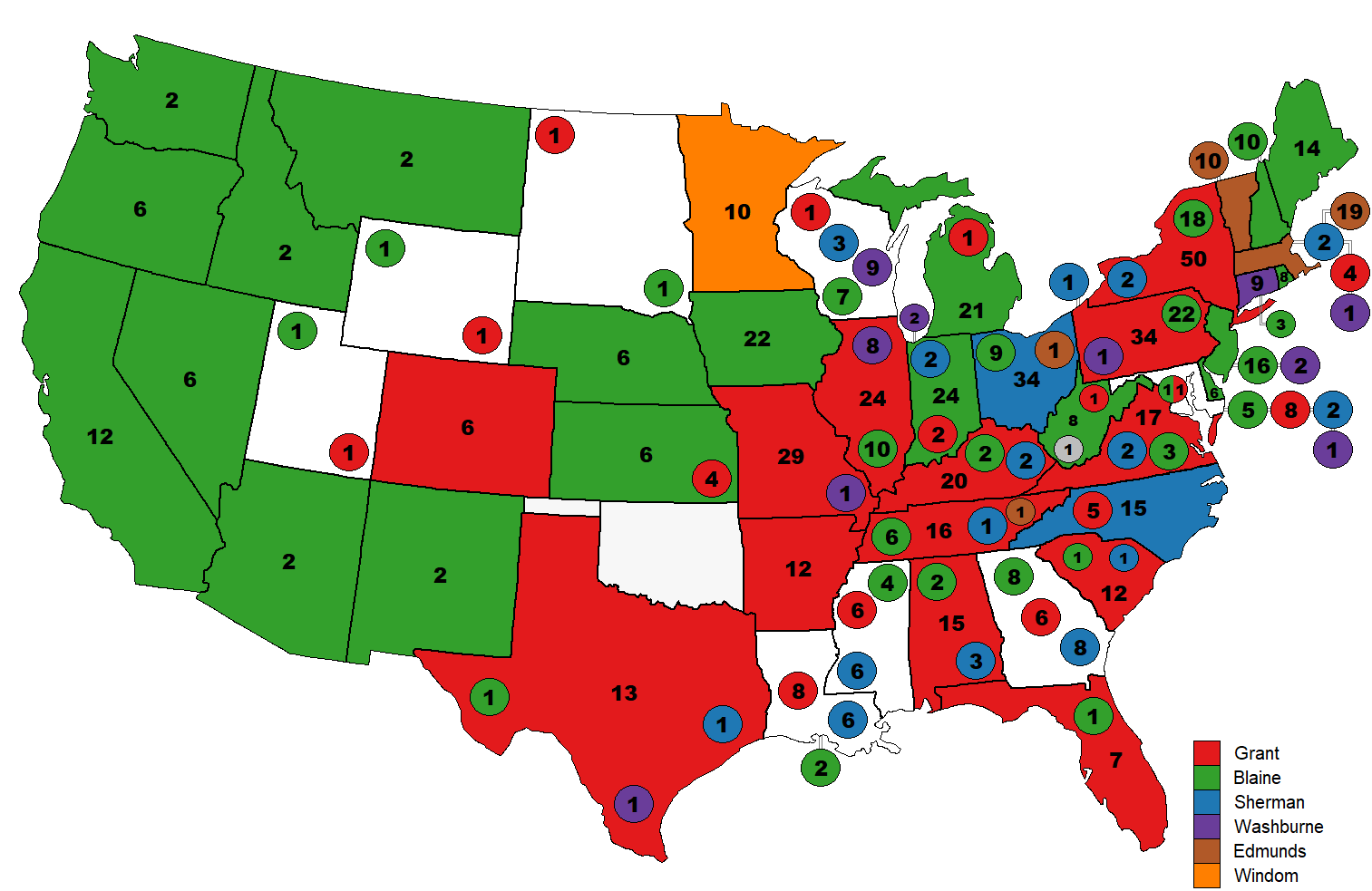
18th Presidential Ballot

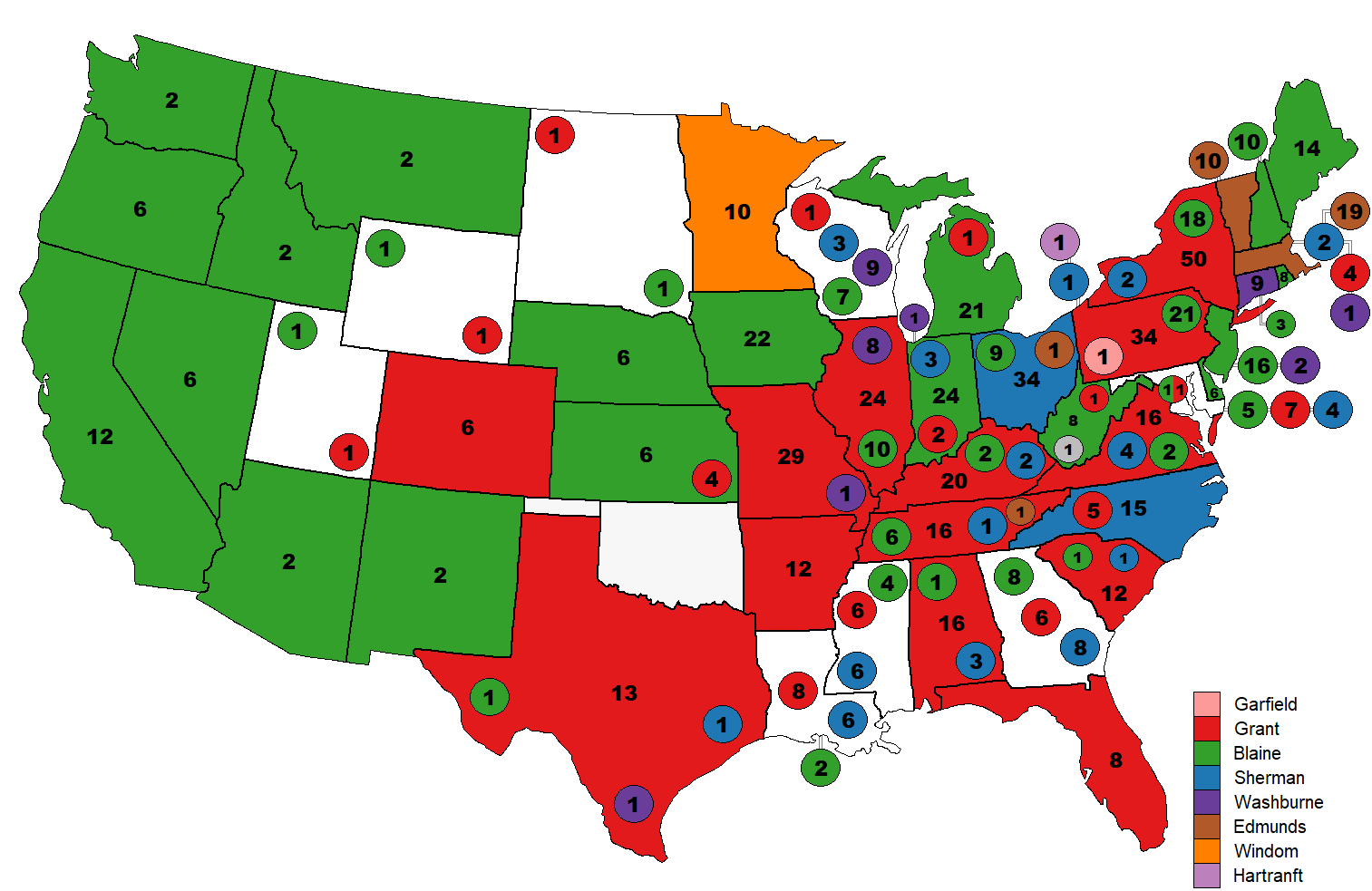
19th Presidential Ballot

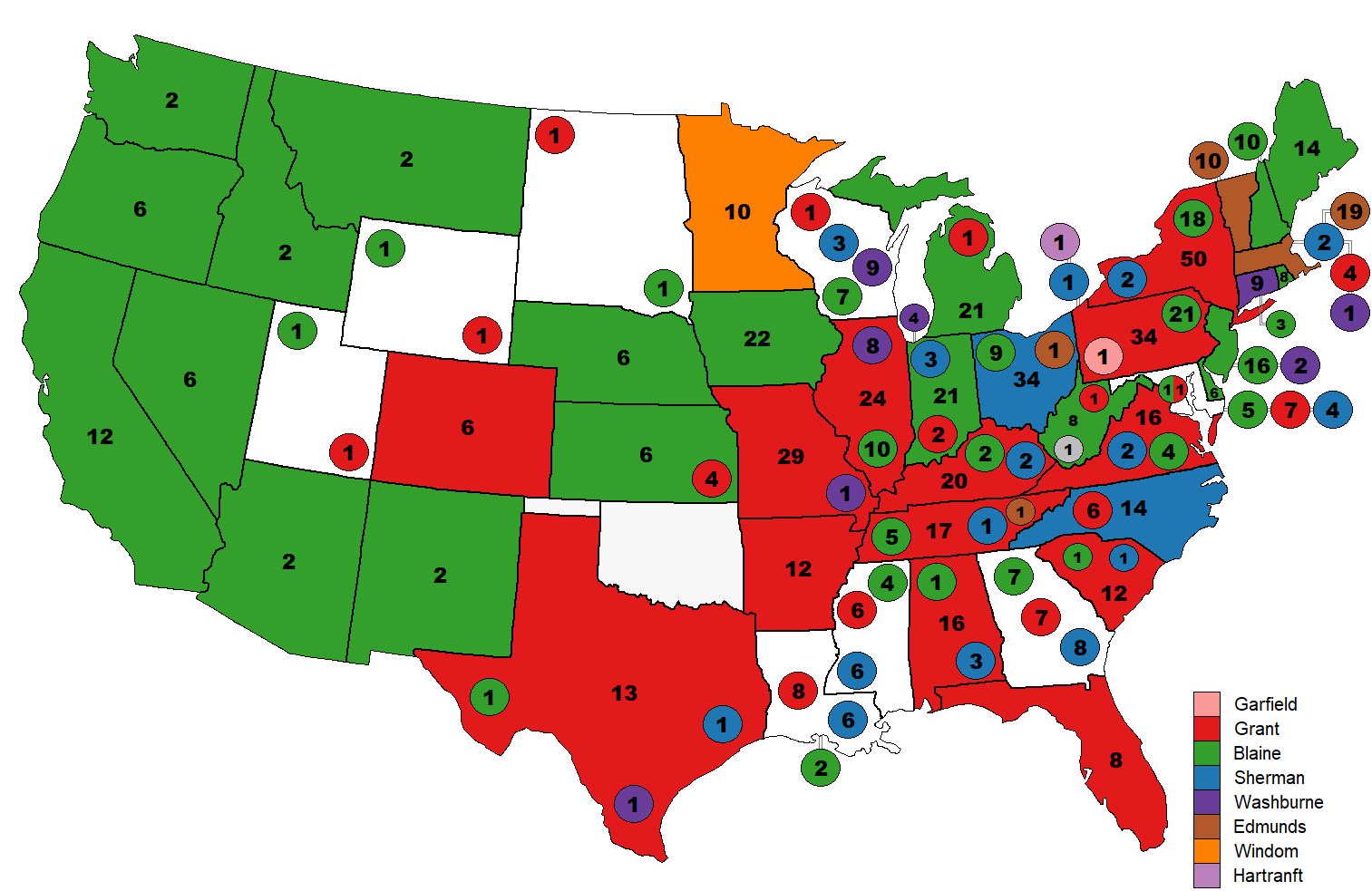
20th Presidential Ballot

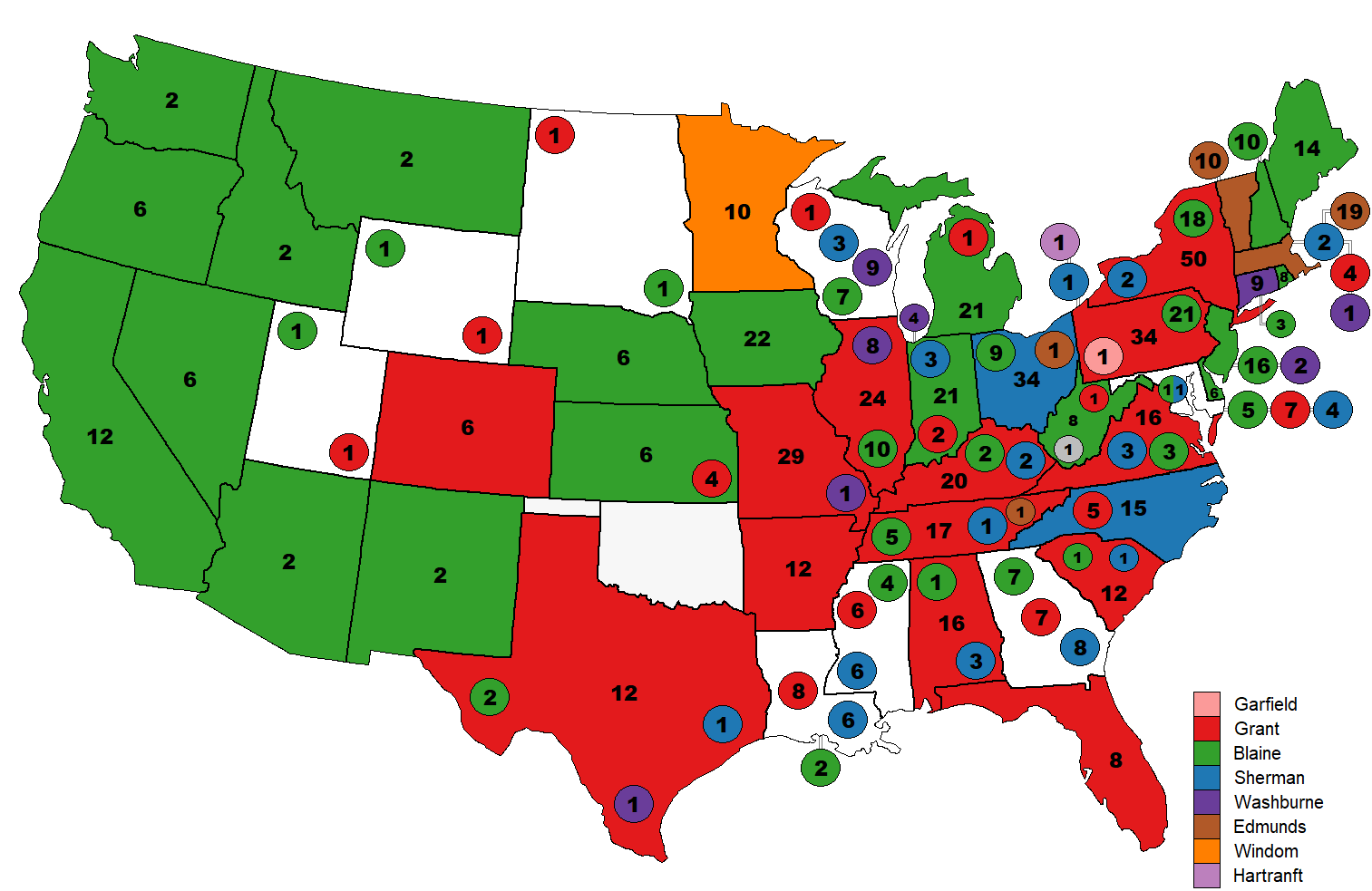
21st Presidential Ballot

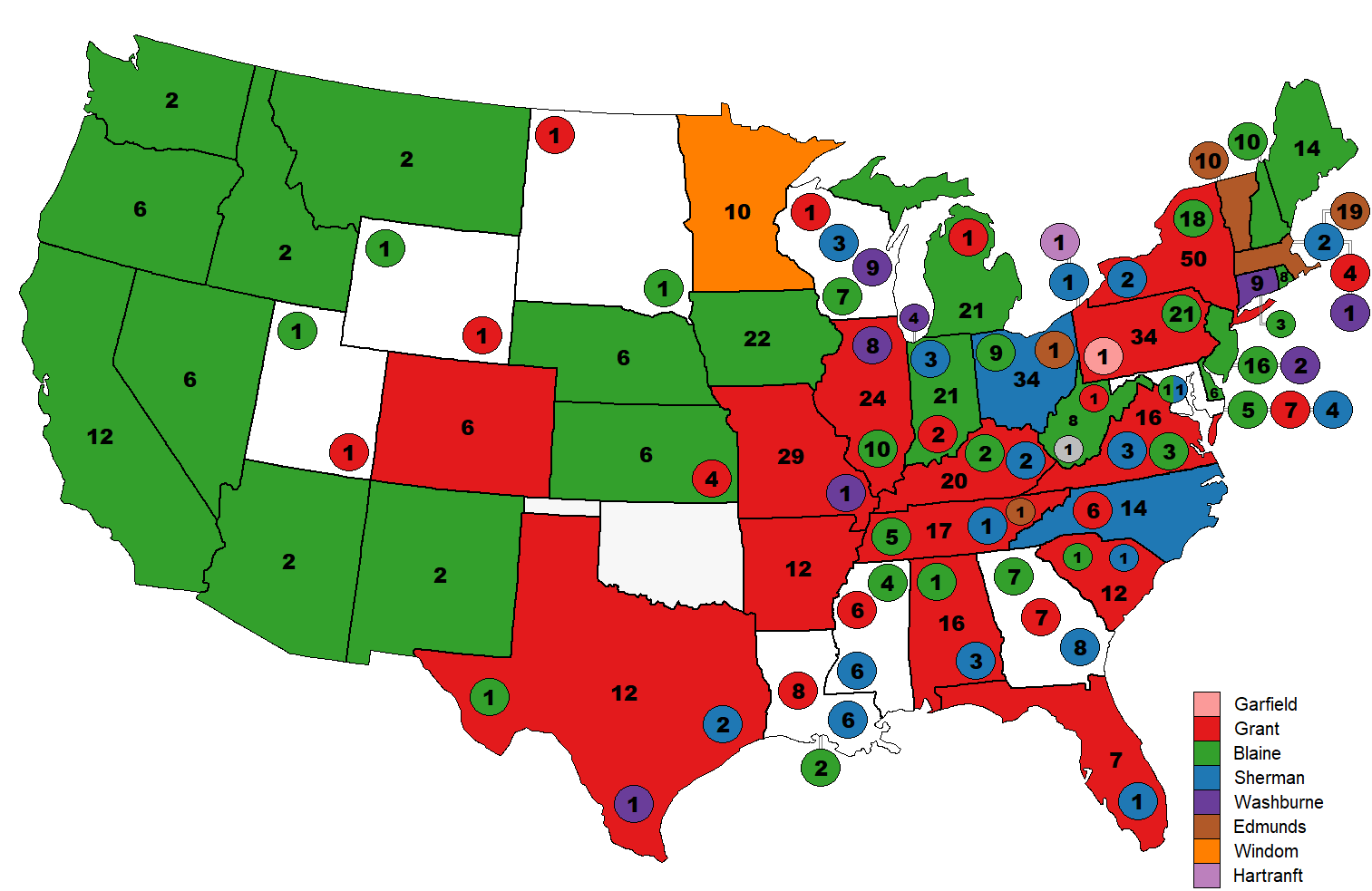
22nd Presidential Ballot

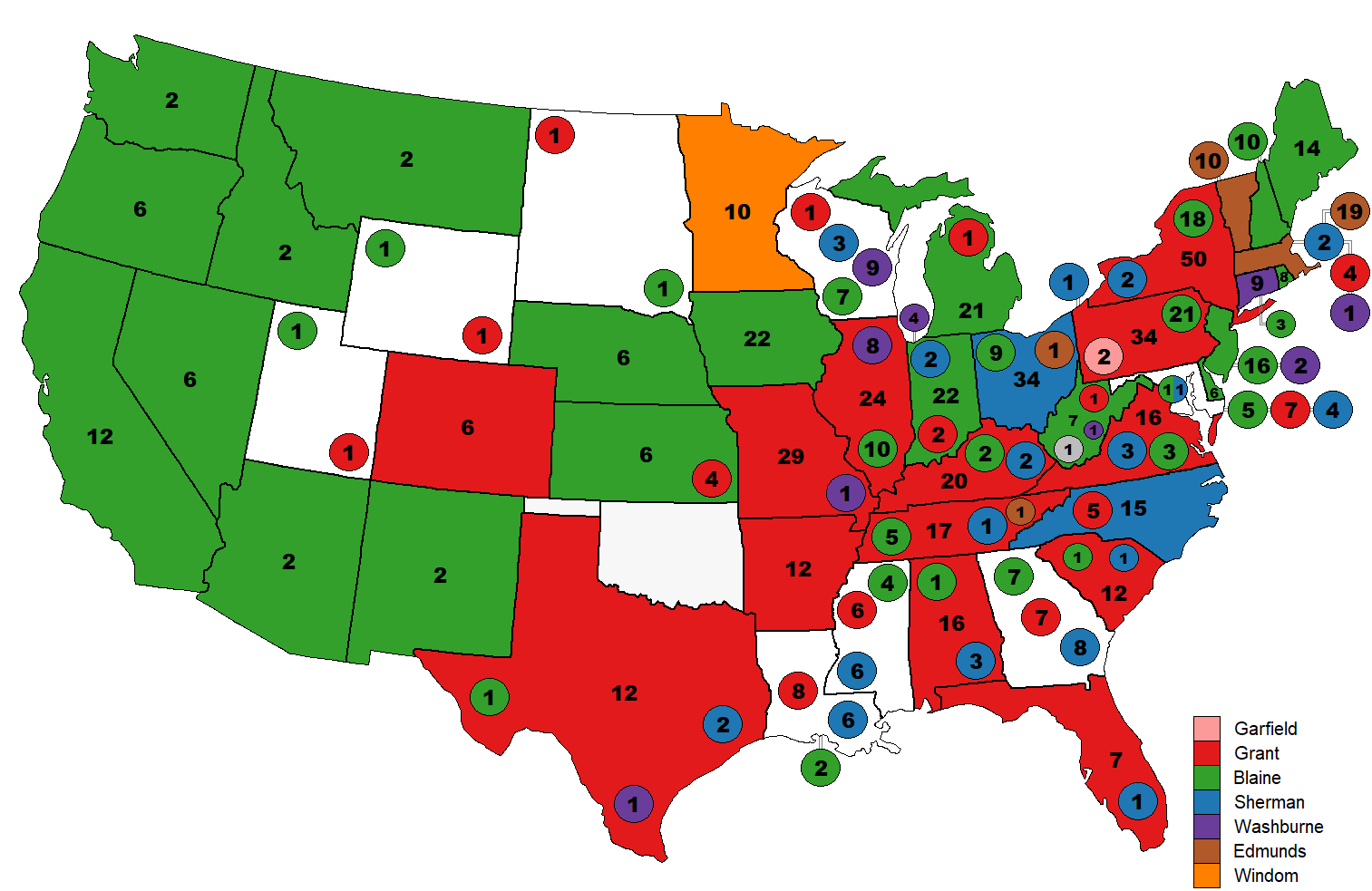
23rd Presidential Ballot

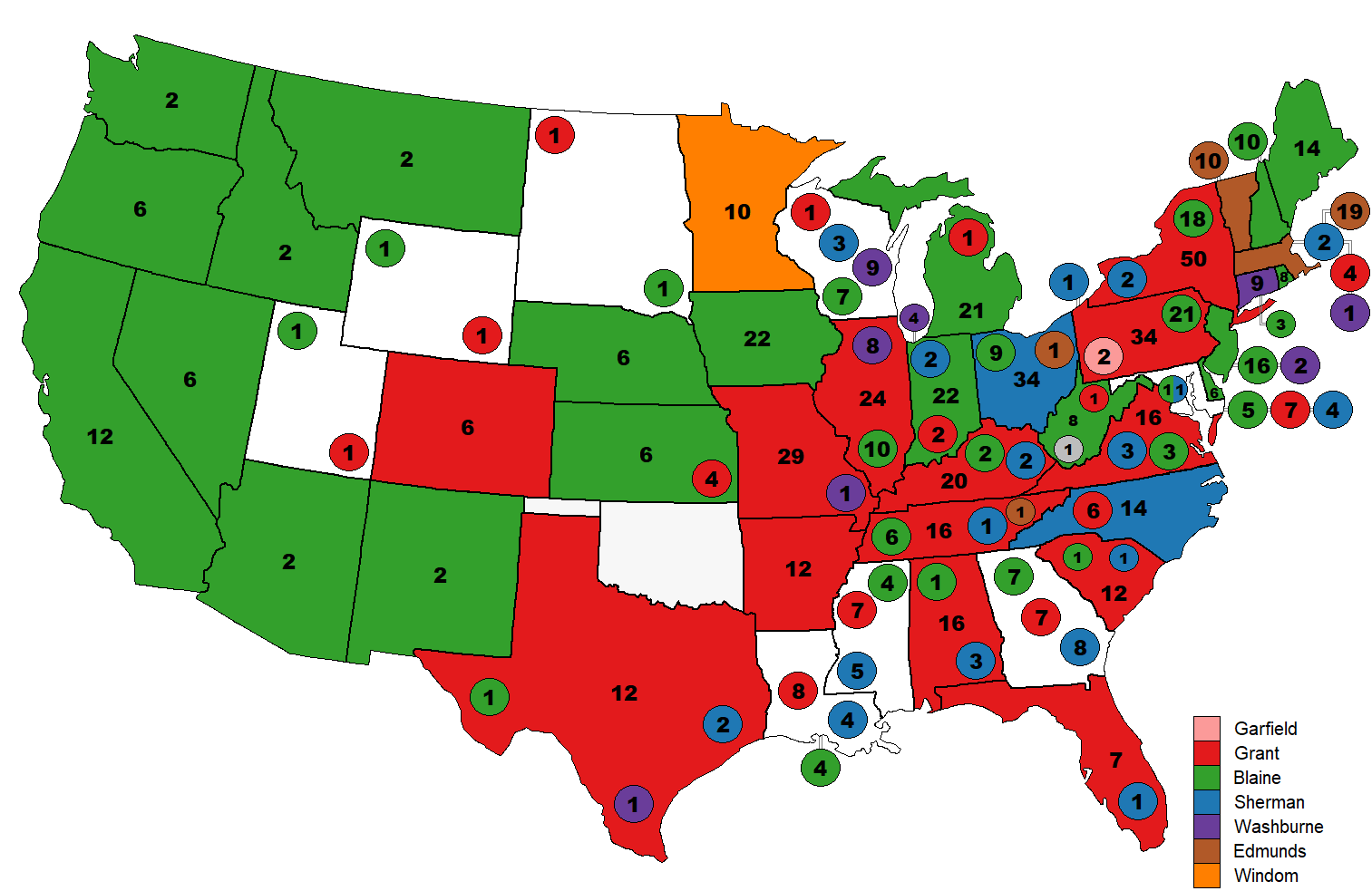
24th Presidential Ballot

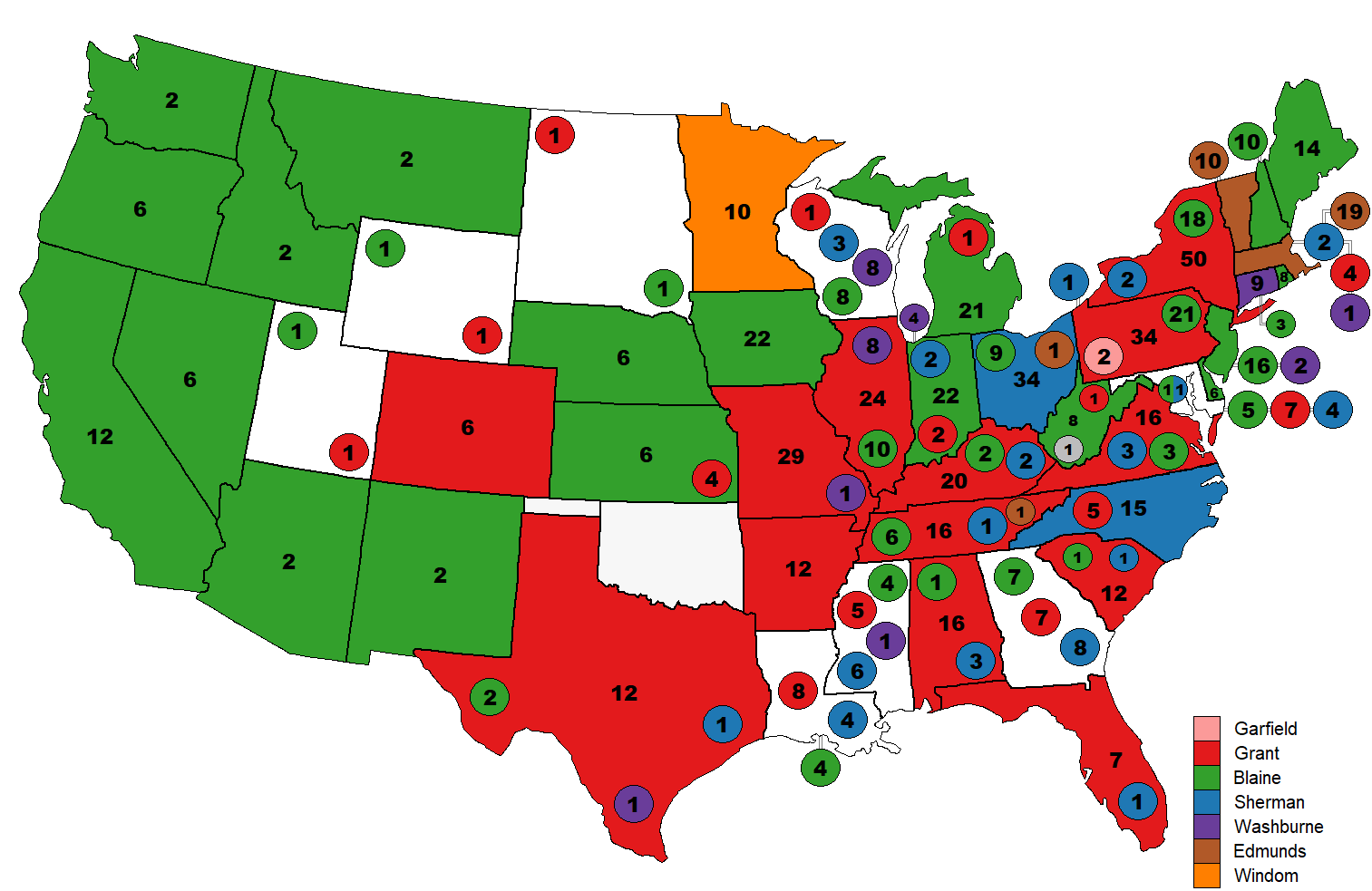
25th Presidential Ballot

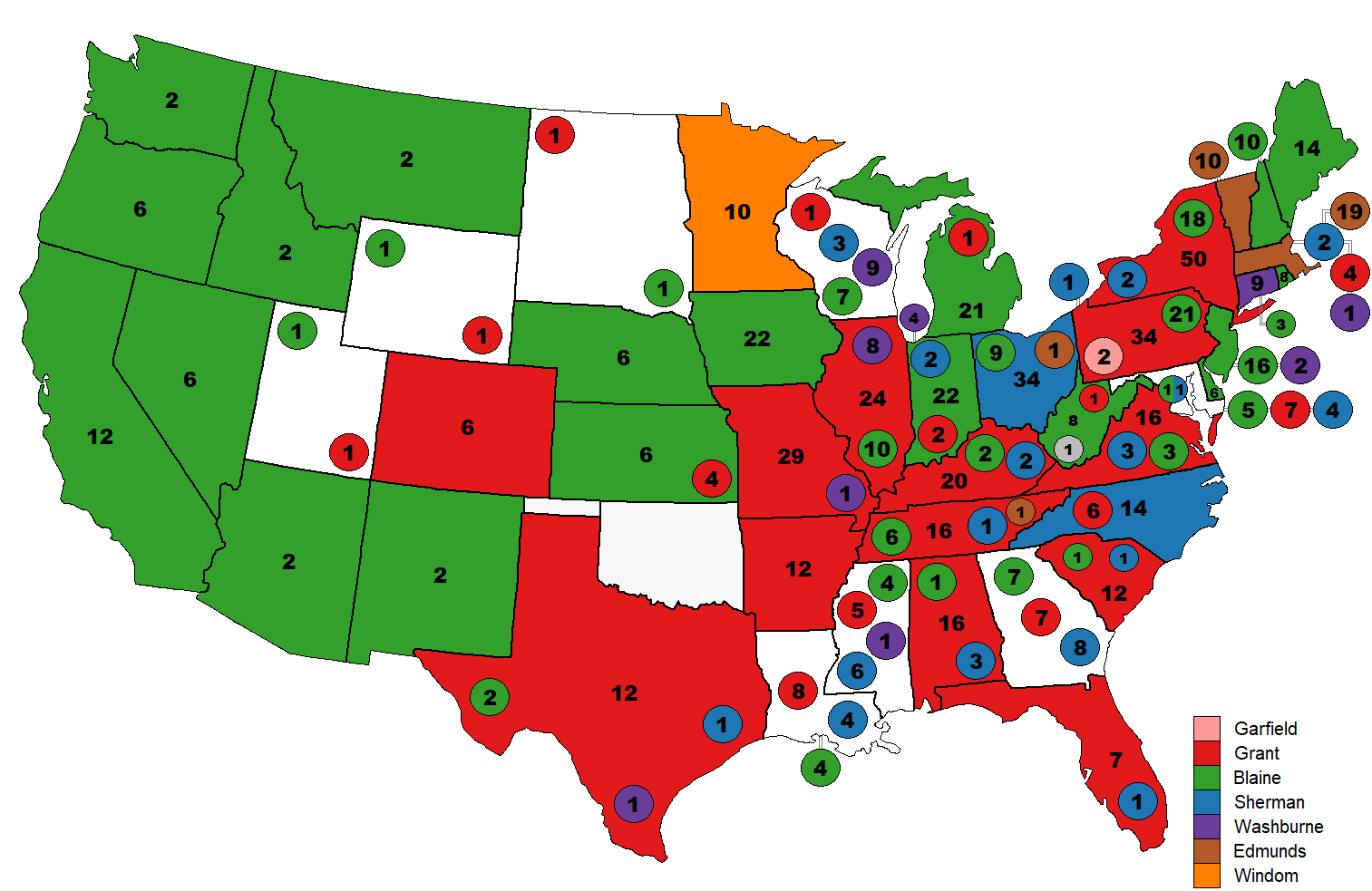
26th Presidential Ballot

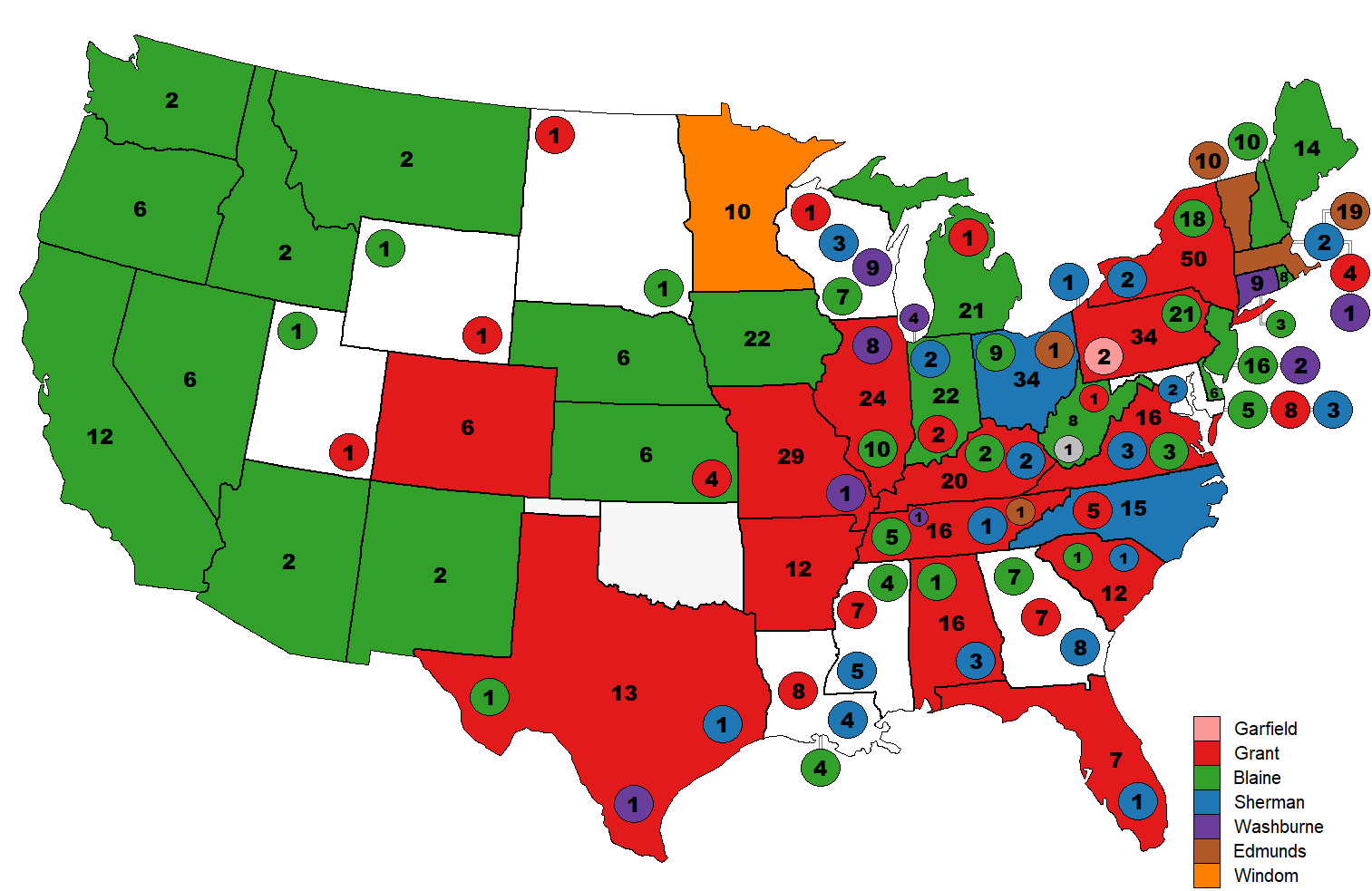
27th Presidential Ballot

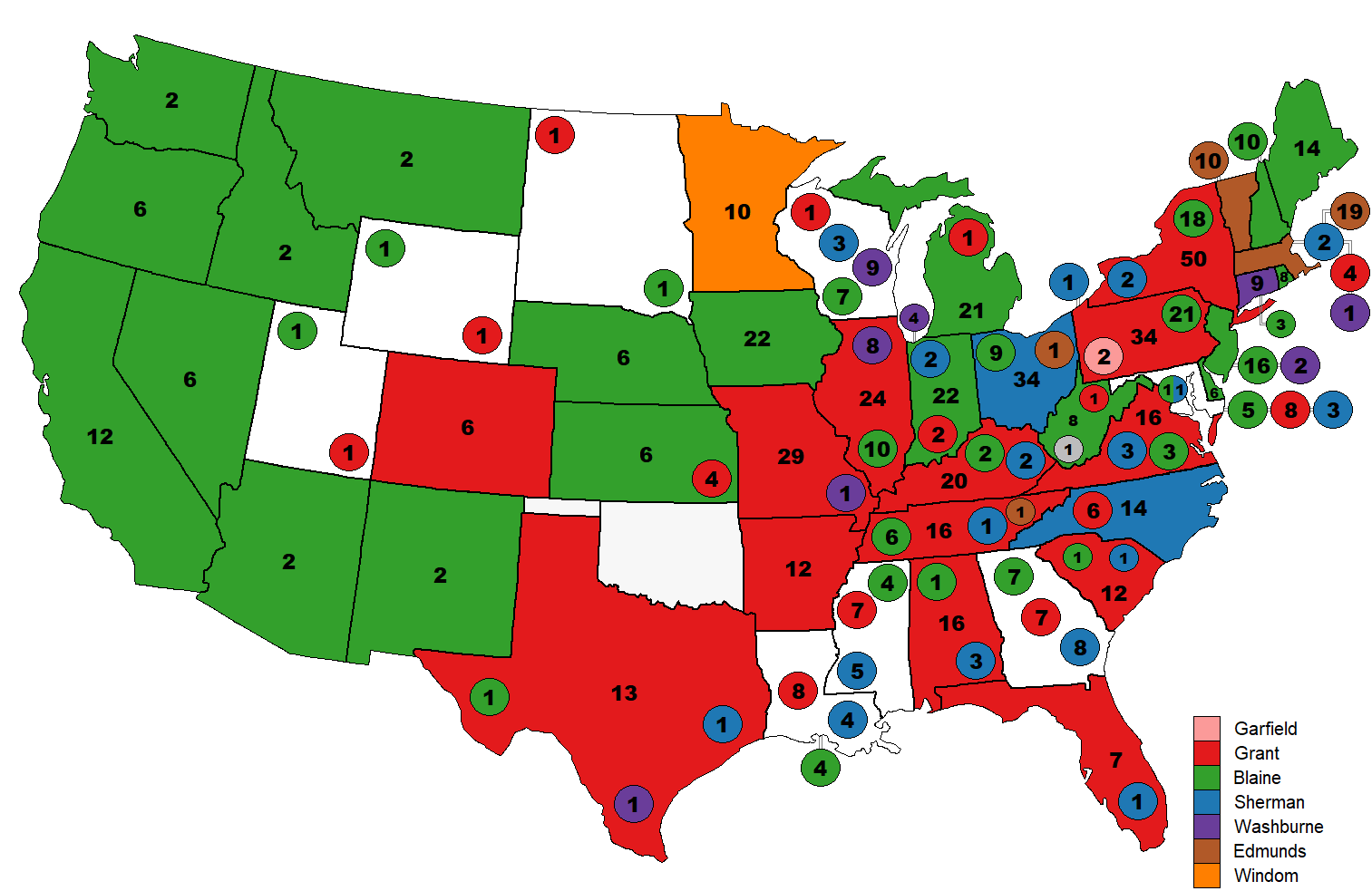
28th Presidential Ballot

Presidential Balloting / 6th Day of Convention (June 8, 1880)

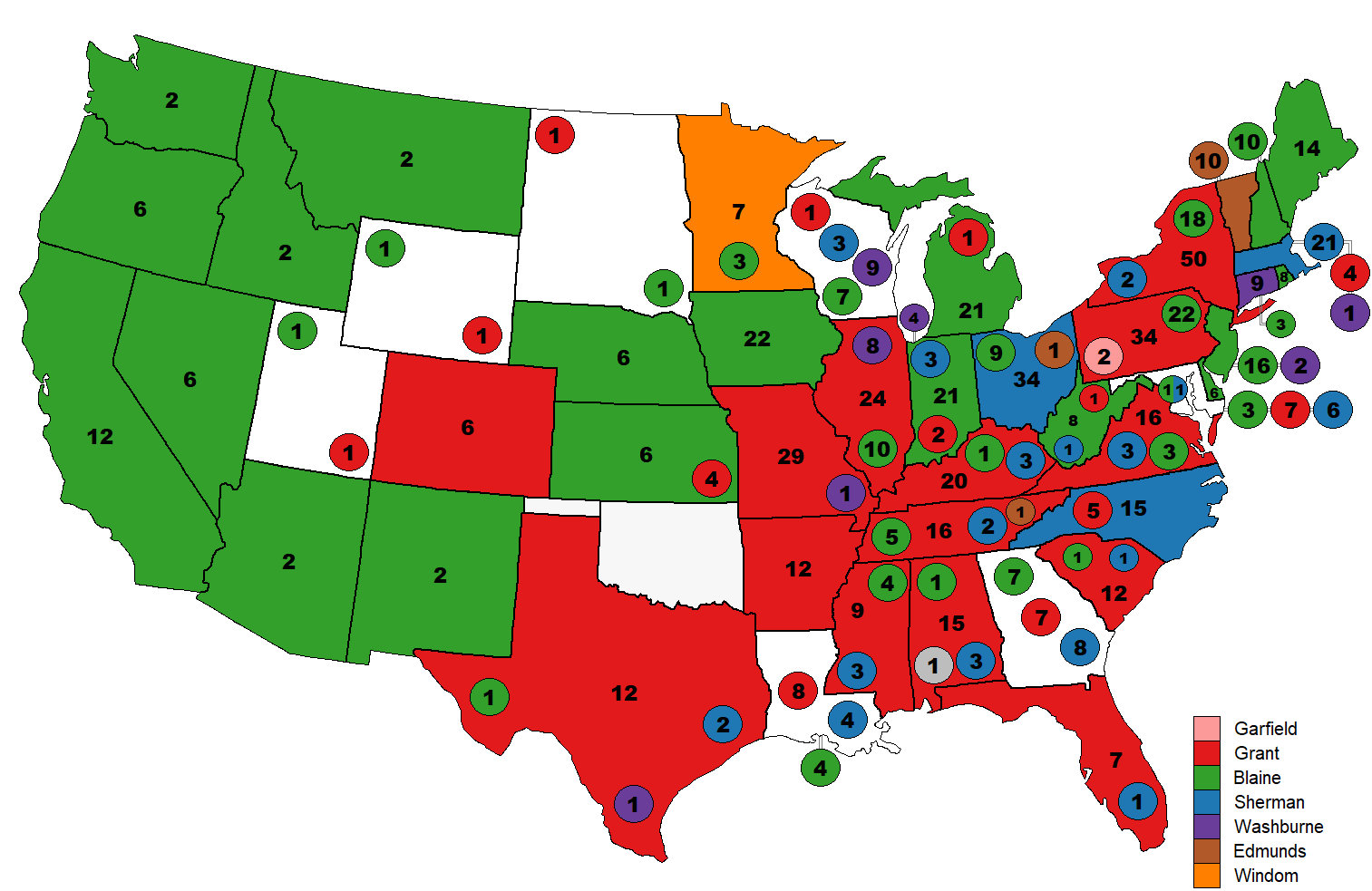
29th Presidential Ballot

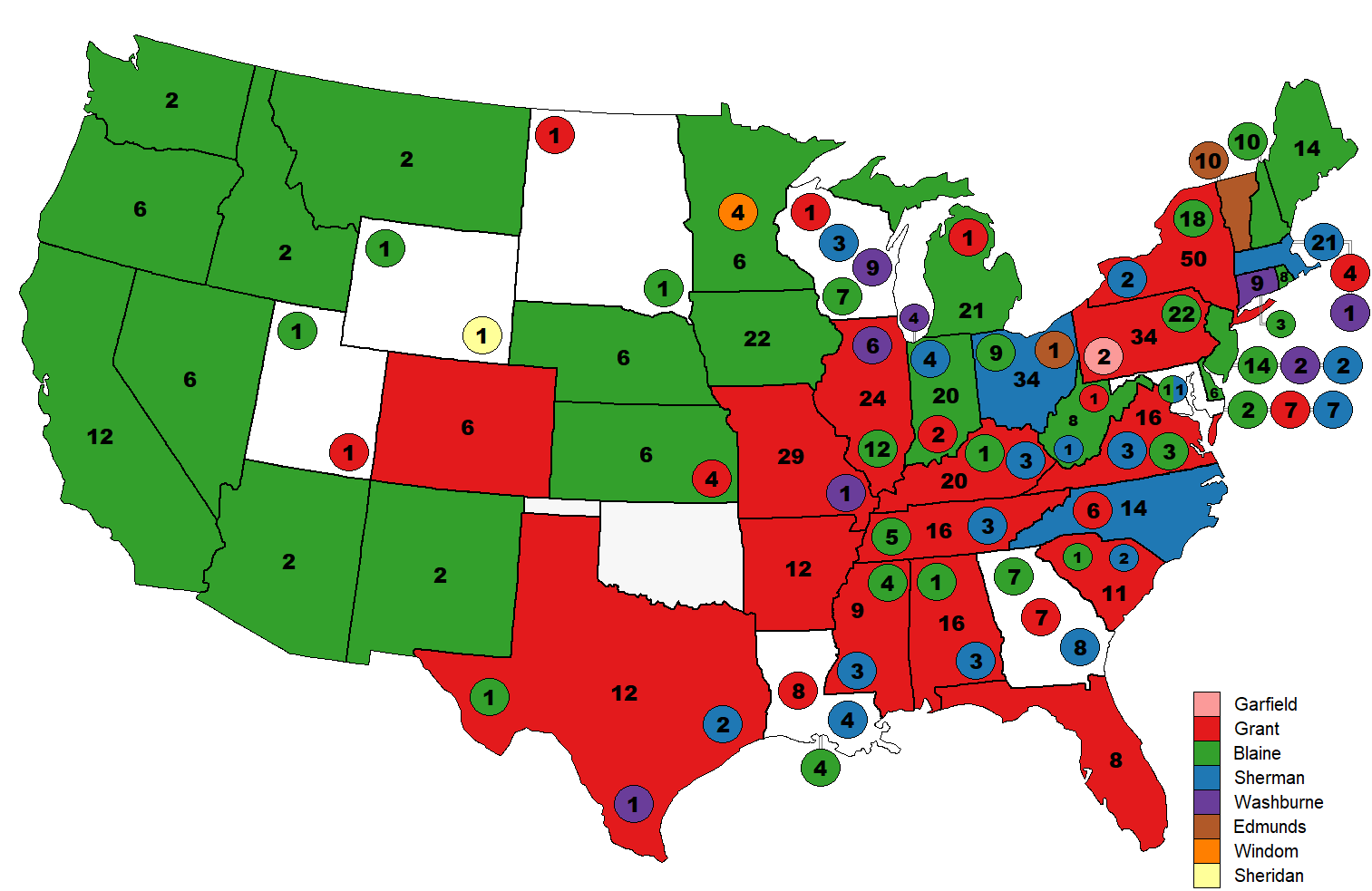
30th Presidential Ballot

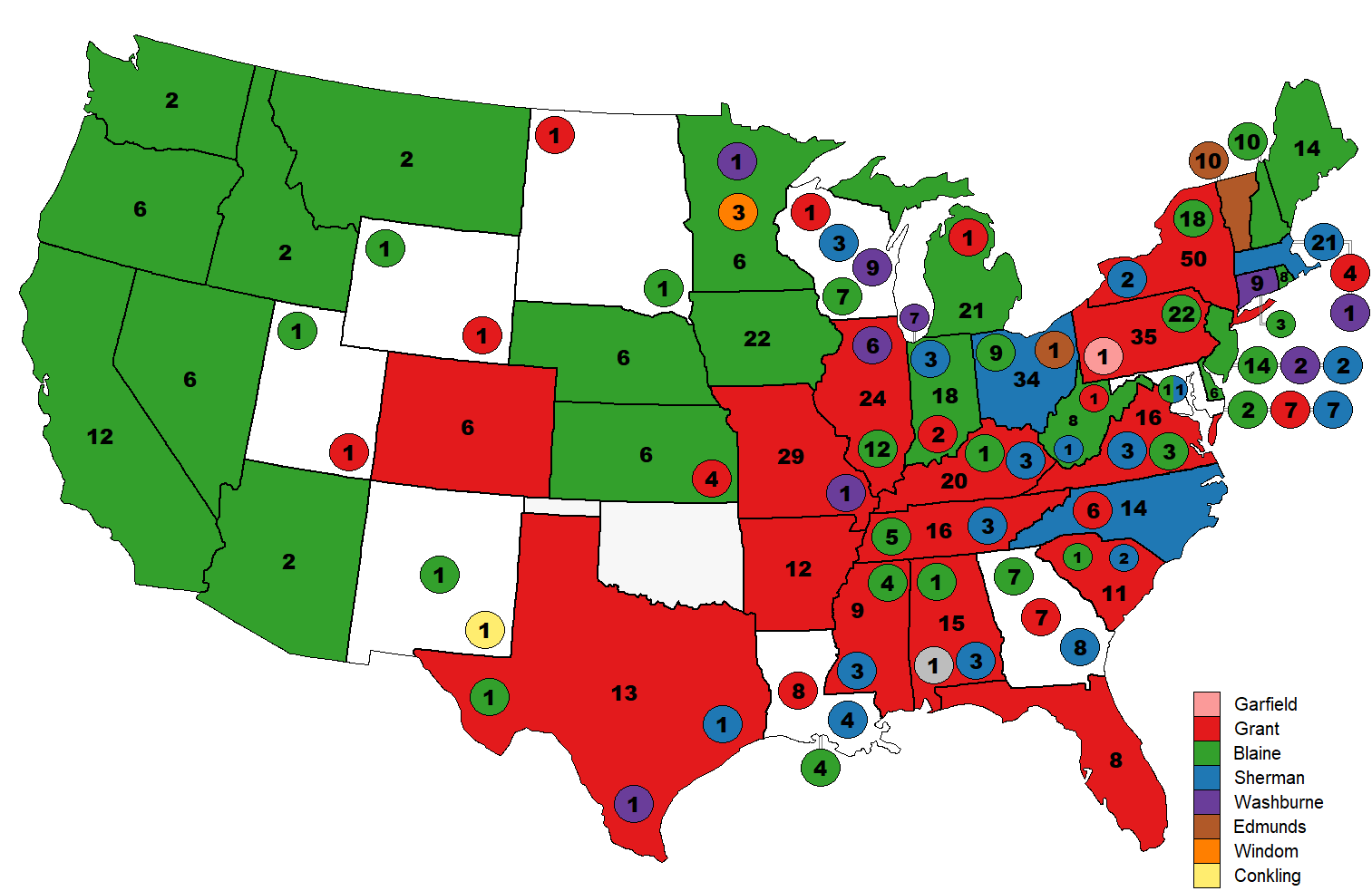
31st Presidential Ballot

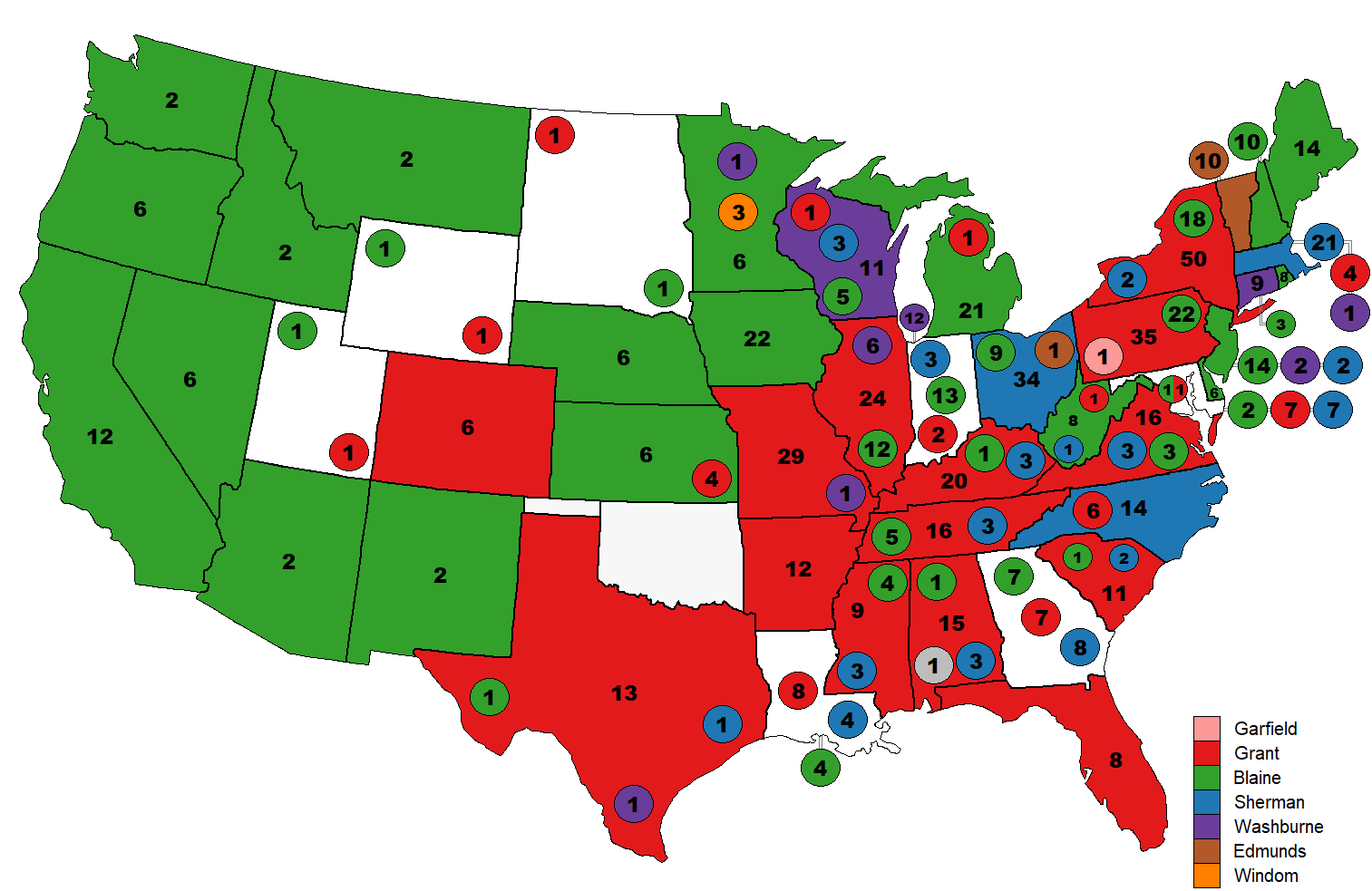
32nd Presidential Ballot

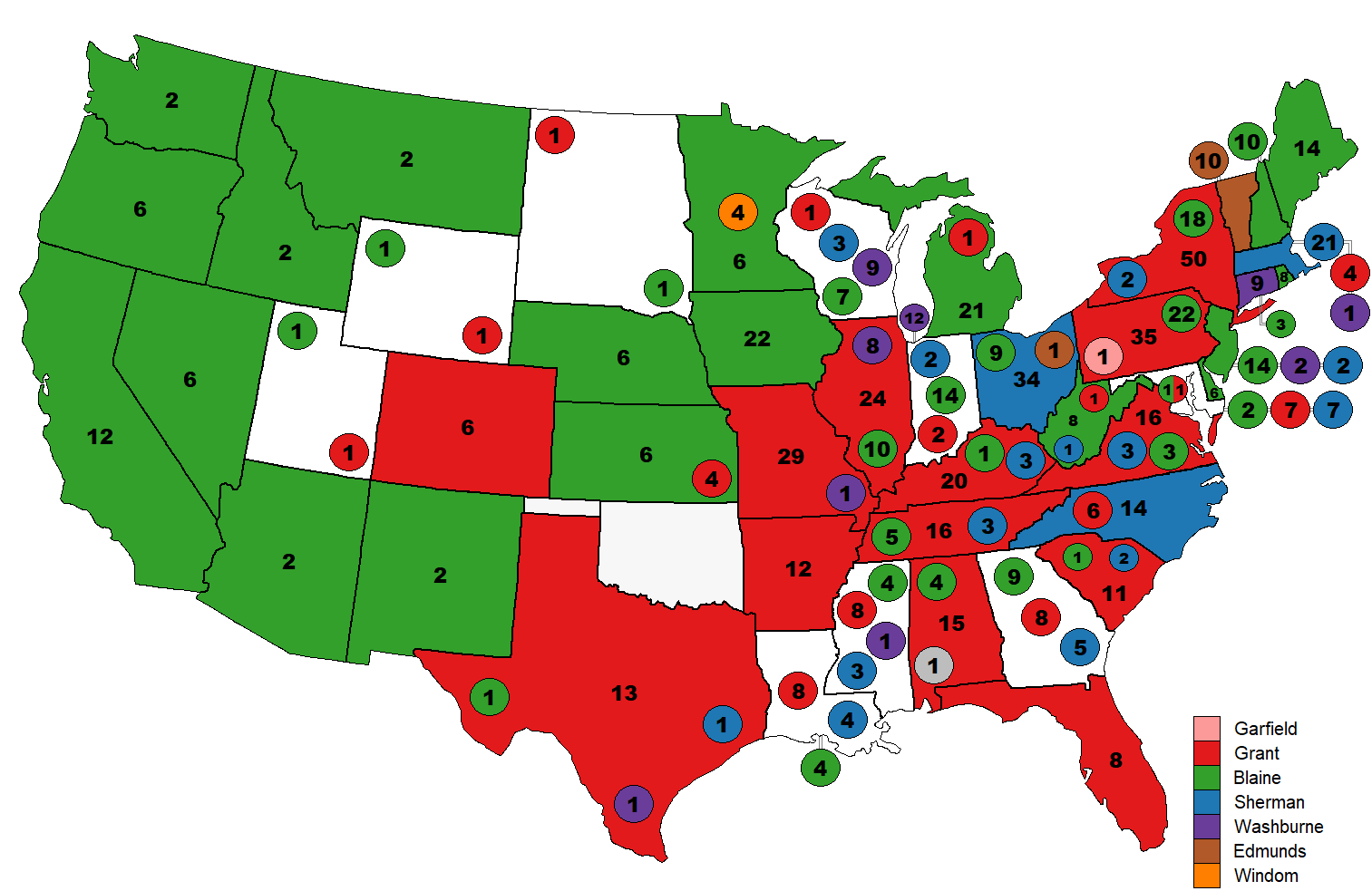
33rd Presidential Ballot

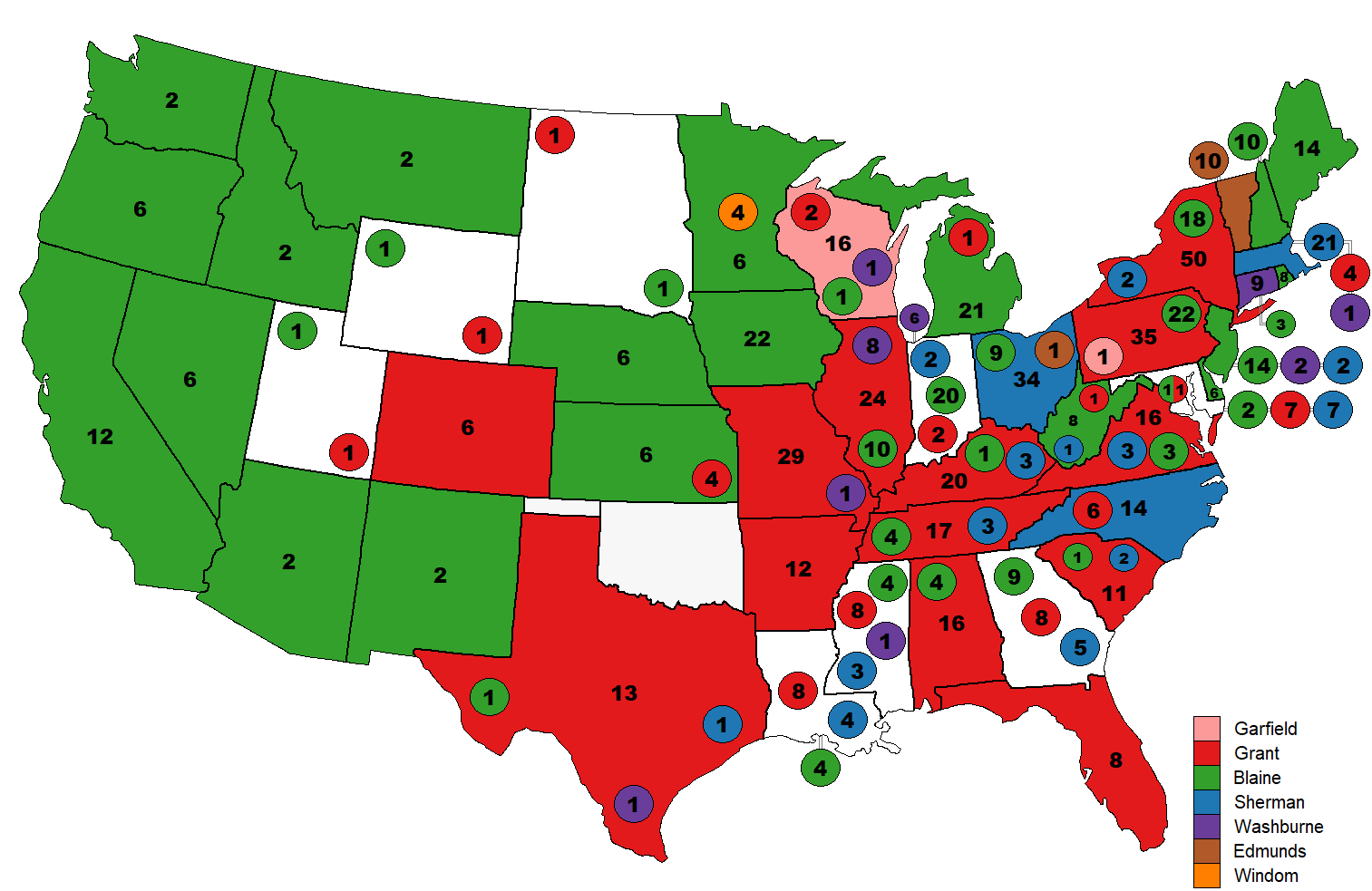
34th Presidential Ballot

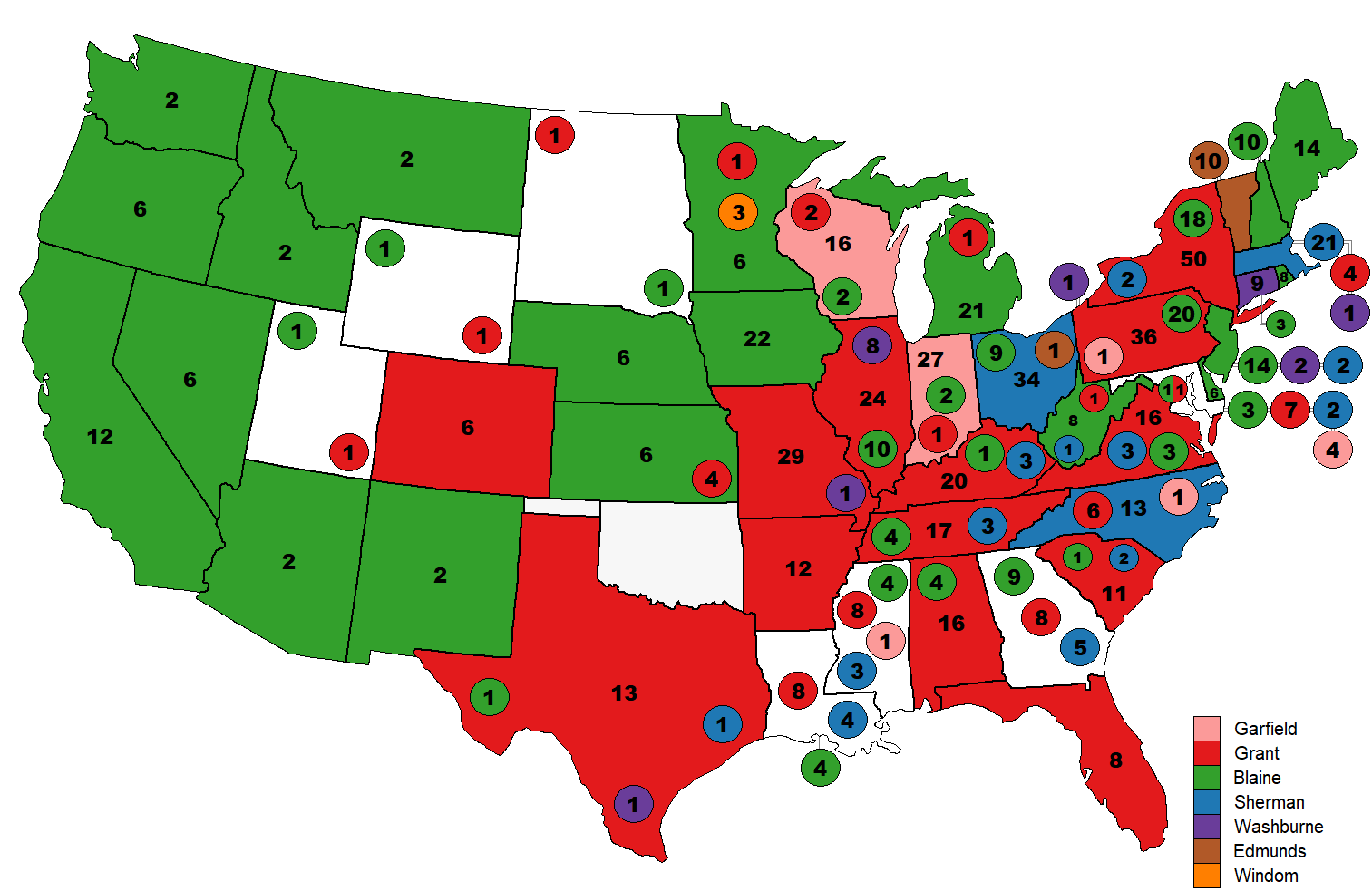
35th Presidential Ballot

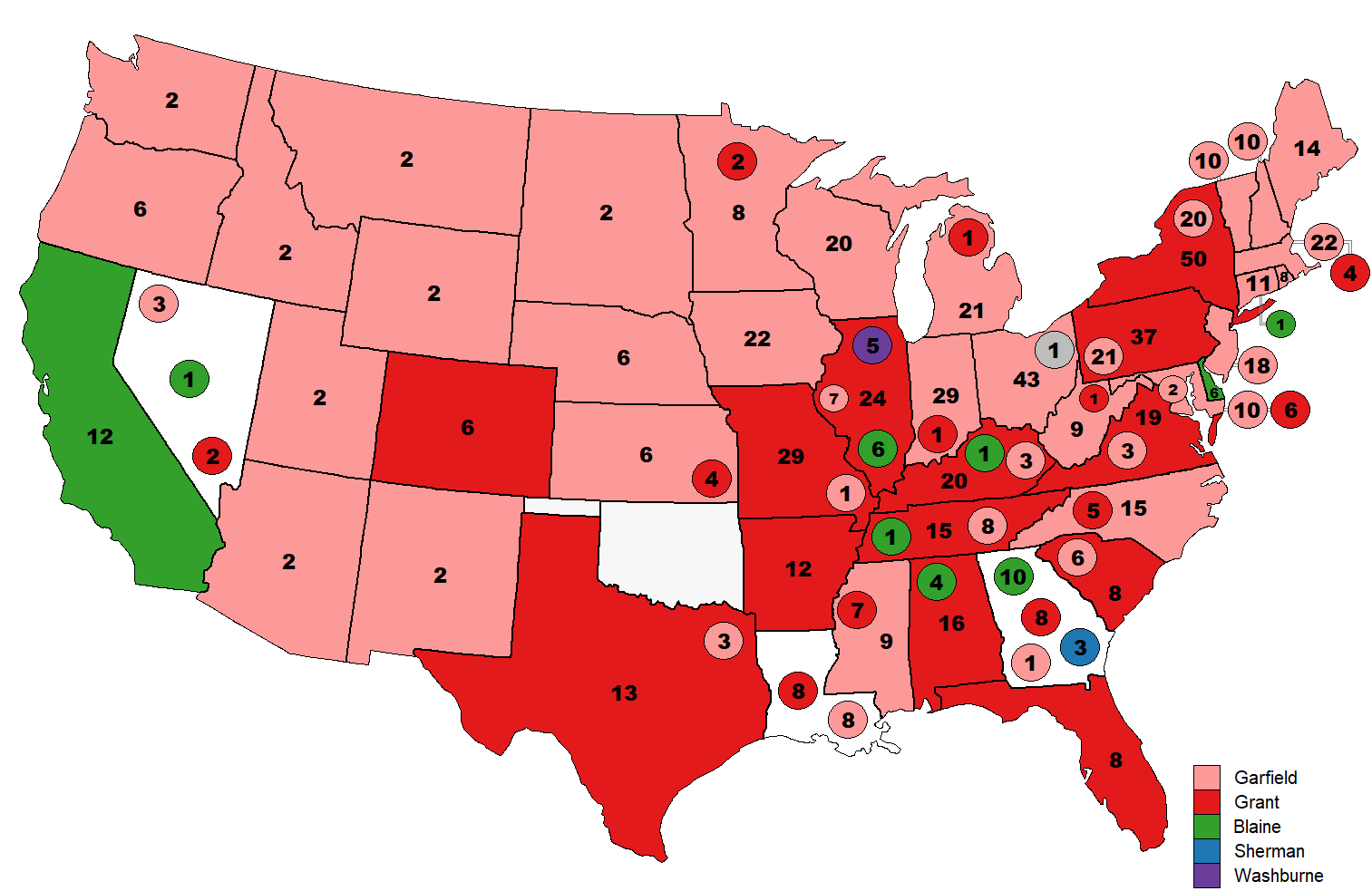
36th Presidential Ballot

Vice Presidential Balloting
Candidate	1st
Arthur	468
Washburne	193
Jewell	44
Maynard	30
Bruce	8
Alcorn	4
Davis	2
Settle	1
Woodford	1
Not Voting	5

Vice Presidential Balloting / 6th Day of Convention (June 8, 1880)

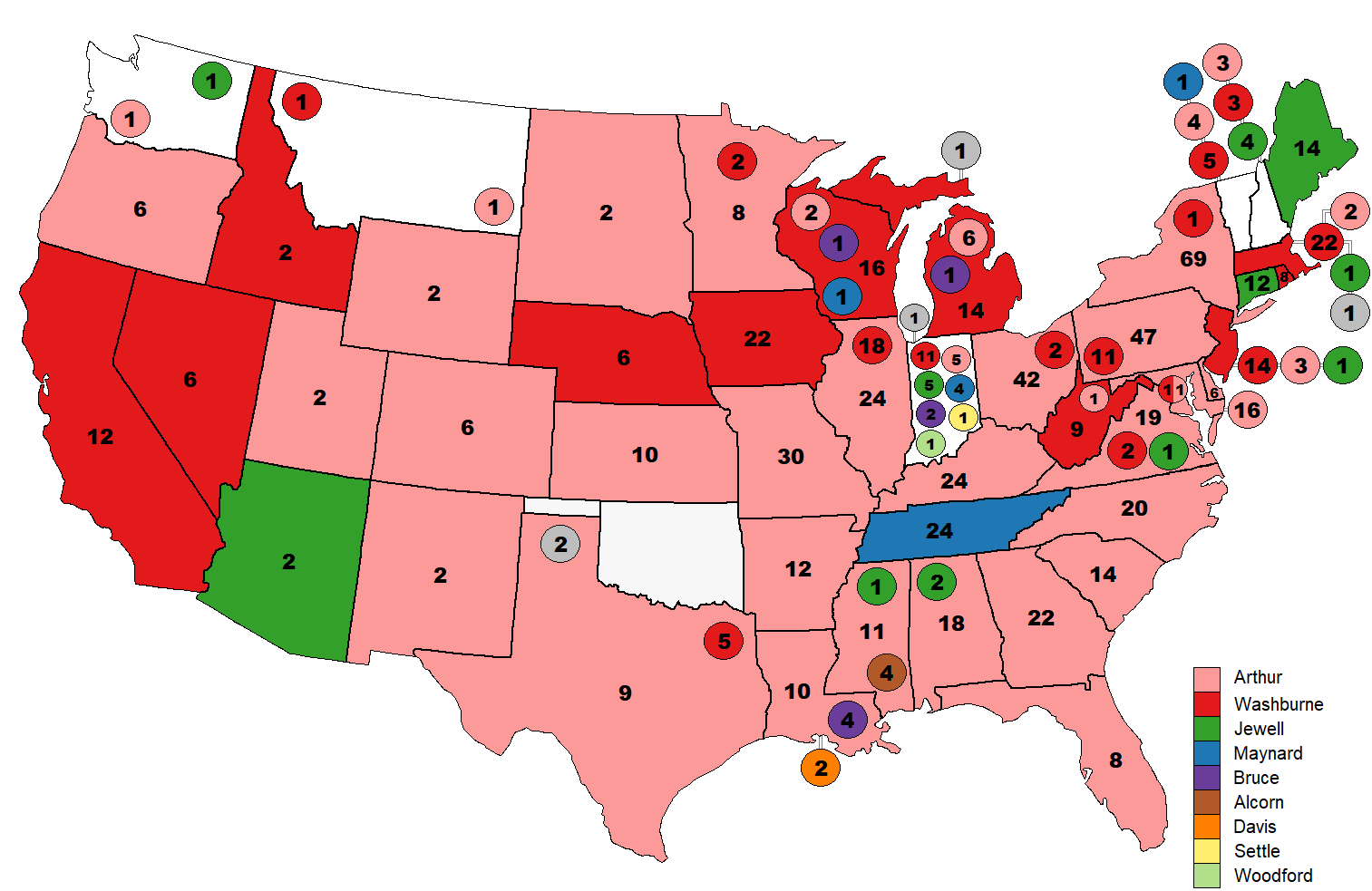
1st Vice Presidential Ballot

== Aftermath ==
Garfield led the first front porch campaign for the Presidency. He did not travel that much, and he usually stayed at home to present his presidential agenda to visitors. Garfield enlisted the support of the other candidates from the convention to help with the campaign. The 1880 Democratic National Convention chose Winfield Scott Hancock as the presidential candidate and William Hayden English as his vice-presidential running mate. The election featured a very close popular vote that put Garfield ahead with a majority of less than 10,000; some sources put the margin as low as 2,000. (Note: There is considerable disagreement among historians about the exact vote totals. As Kenneth Ackerman explained in his 2003 book: "Because (a) voting was decentralized, (b) states certified electoral votes, not popular votes as 'official', and (c) Democratic votes were divided among various splinter groups, there remains today a range of published 'final results' for the 1880 presidential popular vote." The federal government lists the figure of 1,898, which is used in this article. Others give the margin as 7,018; 7,368; or 9,457 among others.) Despite the close popular vote, Garfield won the election with 214 electoral votes to 155 for Hancock.

Electoral results
Presidential candidate	Party	Home state	Popular vote		Electoral vote	Running mate		
Presidential candidate	Party	Home state	Count	Percentage	Electoral vote	Vice-presidential candidate	Home state	Electoral vote
James A. Garfield	Republican	Ohio	4,446,158	48.27%	214	Chester A. Arthur	New York	214
Winfield S. Hancock	Democratic	Pennsylvania	4,444,260	48.25%	155	William H. English	Indiana	155
James B. Weaver	Greenback Labor	Iowa	305,997	3.32%	0	Barzillai J. Chambers	Texas	0
Neal Dow	Prohibition	Maine	10,305	0.11%	0	Henry A. Thompson	Ohio	0
John W. Phelps	Anti-Masonic	Vermont	707	0.01%	0	Samuel C. Pomeroy	Kansas	0
Total			9,211,058	100%	369			369
Needed to win					185			185

On July 2, 1881, Garfield was shot by a former Chicago lawyer named Charles J. Guiteau at the Baltimore and Potomac Railroad Station in Washington, D.C. Guiteau was a staunch supporter of the Stalwarts, and he even gave speeches in New York to rally Grant supporters. After Garfield was elected president, Guiteau repeatedly tried to contact the president and his Secretary of State James G. Blaine in hopes of receiving the consulship in Paris. After finally being told by Blaine that he would not get the position, Guiteau decided to seek revenge on Garfield. He planned Garfield's assassination for weeks. After shooting Garfield, he proclaimed "I am a Stalwart and Arthur will be President." Garfield died on September 19, more than two and a half months after the shooting. After a lengthy trial, Guiteau was sentenced to death, and he was hanged on June 30, 1882.

== See also ==
- List of Republican National Conventions
- 1880 United States presidential election
- United States presidential nominating convention
- History of the Republican Party
- 1880 Democratic National Convention

== Notes ==
Preceded by 1876; Cincinnati, Ohio	Republican National Conventions	Succeeded by 1884; Chicago, Illinois
