= List of Syracuse University College of Law alumni =

Syracuse University College of Law is a private law school in Syracuse, New York. Following are some of its notable alumni.

== Academia ==
- Grey J. Dimenna - president of Monmouth University
- Joanie Mahoney - president of the State University of New York College of Environmental Science and Forestry
- Deborah F. Stanley - president of the State University of New York at Oswego
- David P. Weber - Maryland State university professor; former assistant inspector general of investigations for the U.S. Securities and Exchange Commission (SEC)

== Business ==
- William J. Brodsky - executive chairman of the Chicago Board Options Exchange
- Karen DeCrow - former president of the National Organization for Women
- Carl Paladino - chief executive officer of Ellicott Development Co.

== Entertainment ==
- Jay Schadler - ABC News correspondent and journalist

== Government ==
- Andrew P. Bakaj - former Department of Defense and CIA official; lead counsel for the whistleblower during the impeachment inquiry and the subsequent impeachment of President Donald Trump
- Rostin Behnam - commissioner, Commodity Futures Trading Commission
- Ann Marie Buerkle - commissioner, U.S. Consumer Product Safety Commission; former U.S. representative for 25th District of New York
- David P. Weber - former assistant inspector general of investigations for the U.S. Securities and Exchange Commission (SEC); current Maryland State university professor

== Judiciary ==
- Bob Antonacci - New York Supreme Court
- Richard J. Cardamone - senior judge for the United States Court of Appeals for the Second Circuit
- Mae D'Agostino - judge for the U.S. District Court, Northern District of New York
- Sydney F. Foster - former justice, New York Court of Appeals
- James E. Graves Jr. - judge for the United States Court of Appeals for the Fifth Circuit
- Vincent S. Haneman - former Associate Justice Supreme Court of New Jersey
- William Q. Hayes - judge for the U.S. District Court, Southern District of California
- David N. Hurd - judge for the U.S. District Court, Northern District of New York
- Thomas Blake Kennedy - senior judge for the United States District Court for the District of Wyoming
- Edmund H. Lewis - former chief judge of the New York Court of Appeals
- Robert D. Mariani - judge for the United States District Court for the Middle District of Pennsylvania
- Neal P. McCurn - senior judge for the U.S. District Court, Northern District of New York
- Theodore A. McKee - chief judge for the U.S. Court of Appeals for the Third Circuit
- Amanda H. Mercier - chief judge for the Georgia Court of Appeals
- Norman A. Mordue - senior judge for the U.S. District Court, Northern District of New York
- Howard G. Munson - senior judge for the U.S. District Court, Northern District of New York
- John Pajak - chief special trial judge, United States Tax Court
- Edmund Port - senior judge for the U.S. District Court, Northern District of New York
- Frederick Scullin - senior judge for the U.S. District Court, Northern District of New York
- Glenn T. Suddaby - judge for the U.S. District Court, Northern District of New York
- Sandra L. Townes - judge for the U.S. District Court, Eastern District of New York

== Law ==
- Adam Leitman Bailey - lawyer, defended the Ground Zero Mosque, and other prominent cases
- Beau Biden - attorney general of Delaware
- David Crane - chief prosecutor for the Special Court for Sierra Leone

== Literature ==
- Tim Green - The New York Times best-selling author and former professional athlete
- Elizabeth Strout - Pulitzer Prize-winning author of Olive Kitteridge

== Politics ==
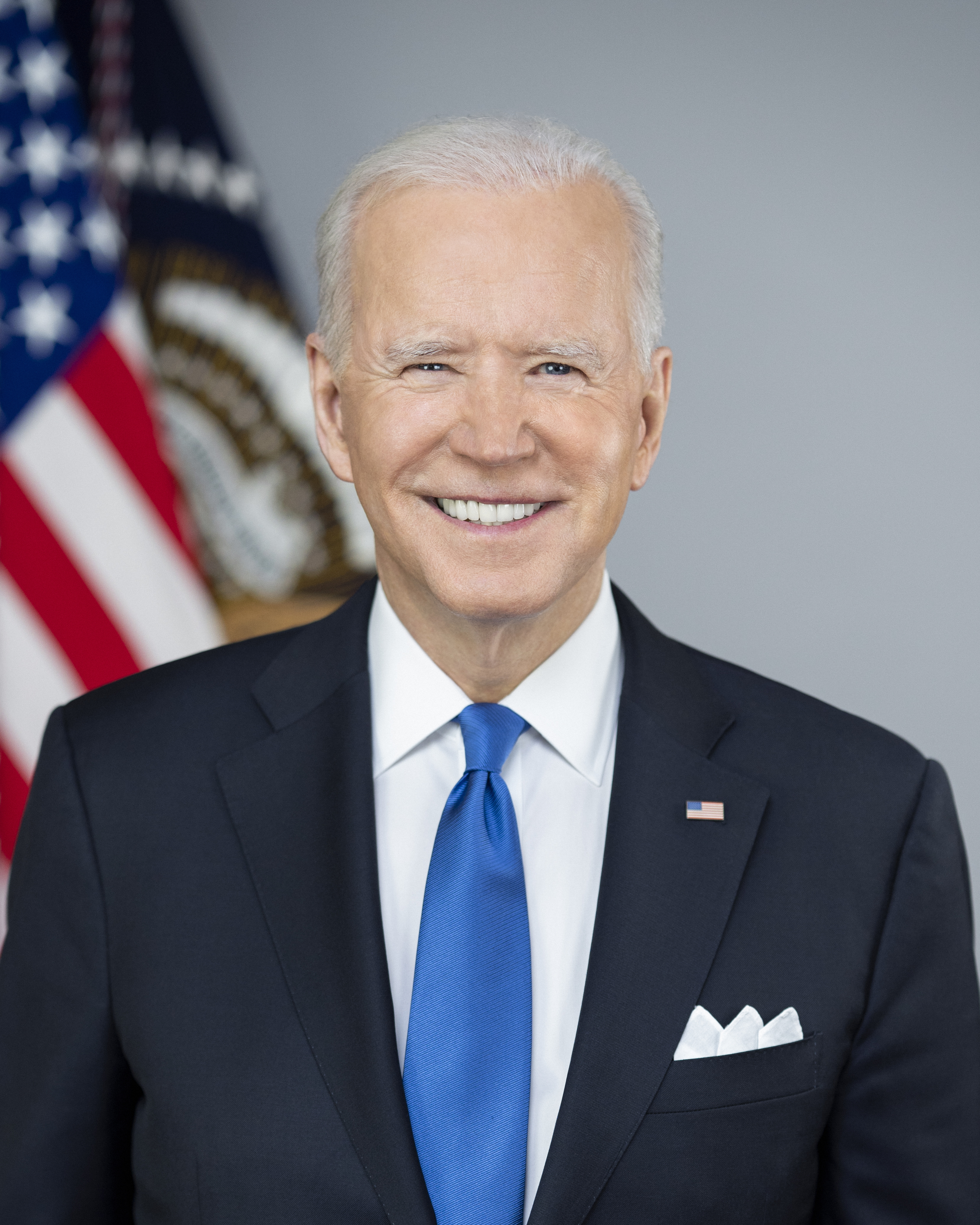
46th president of the United States Joe Biden L'68

=== U.S. presidents ===
- Joe Biden - 46th president of the United States of the United States, 47th Vice President of the United States

=== Diplomacy ===
- Hugh Douglas Barclay - former United States ambassador to El Salvador
- Herman W. Nickel - former United States ambassador to South Africa

=== U.S. legislature ===
- Ann Marie Buerkle - U.S. representative for 25th District of New York
- Alfonse D'Amato - former U.S. senator from New York
- John Katko - U.S. representative from the 24th District of New York
- Randy Kuhl - former U.S. representative from the 29th District of New York
- John H. Terry - former U.S. representative from the 34th District of New York
- Theodore S. Weiss - former U.S. representative from the 20th and 17th District of New York

=== State ===
- William Barclay - New York State Assembly
- Jeffrey Brown - New York State Assembly
- Jack Jackson Jr. - Arizona state senator
- Ben Keathley - Missouri state representative
- Tarky Lombardi - New York state senator
- William Magnarelli - New York State Assembly
- Michael Nozzolio - New York state senator
- Ted O'Brien - New York state senator
- Tom O'Mara - New York state senator
- Addie Jenne Russell - New York State Assembly
- Walter W. Westall - New York state senator
- Frank M. Williams - New York state engineer and surveyor

== Sports ==
- John Barsha - professional football player
- Tim Green - former professional athlete; New York Times best-selling author
