= Judge Brennan =

Judge Brennan may refer to:

- Bridget M. Brennan (born 1974), judge of the United States District Court for the Northern District of Ohio
- Michael B. Brennan (born 1963), judge of the United States Court of Appeals for the Seventh Circuit
- Stephen W. Brennan (1893–1968), judge of the United States District Court for the Northern District of New York

== See also ==
- Justice Brennan (disambiguation)
