= James T. Foley United States Courthouse =

1930s US federal government building in Albany, New York

- United States Post Office, Court House, and Custom House
- U.S. National Register of Historic Places
- U.S. Historic district – Contributing property
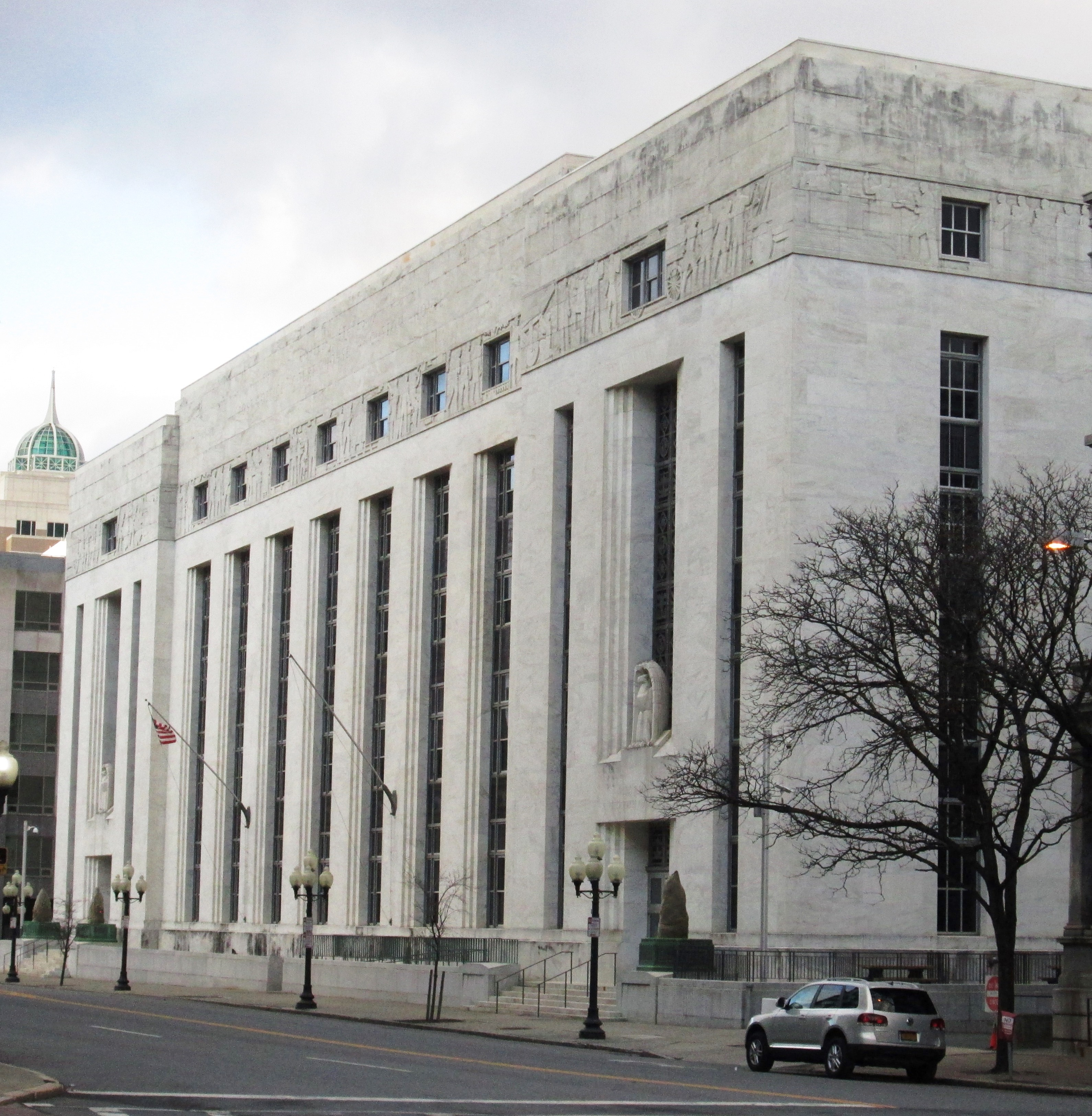
- West (front) elevation and south profile, 2019

- Location within New York Location within the United States
- Interactive map showing the location for US Post Office, Court and Customs House, Albany
- Location: 445 Broadway, Albany, New York
- Coordinates: 42°38′58.3686″N 73°45′0.5502″W
- Architect: Gander, Gander & Gander, Norman R. Sturgis, Electus Darwin Litchfield
- Architectural style: Art Deco
- Part of: Downtown Albany Historic District (ID80002579)
- NRHP reference No.: 10005000
- Added to NRHP: February 28, 2020

The James T. Foley United States Courthouse is a stone Art Deco federal courthouse, located on Broadway (New York State Route 32) in downtown Albany, New York, United States. Built in the 1930s, it was included in 1980 as a contributing property when the Downtown Albany Historic District was listed on the National Register of Historic Places. In 2020 it was listed on the Register individually as the United States Post Office, Court House, and Custom House.

The building houses courtrooms and chambers of the United States District Court for the Northern District of New York, offices of the district's U.S. Attorney, and the local offices of several federal law enforcement agencies. For 60 years after its construction it served as Albany's main post office as well. It was designed and constructed under the supervision of consulting architect Electus Darwin Litchfield and built by the Kenny Brothers Construction Company.

== Building history ==
In 1930, Congress allocated $3.325 million for the Secretary of the Treasury to purchase a site and construct a new federal building in Albany, New York, to house a post office, courthouse, and custom house. The following year, the government chose a location on the southeast corner of Broadway and Maiden Lane and subsequently demolished several existing buildings to prepare the site for new construction. The Office of the Supervising Architect of the Treasury selected the prominent local architectural firm Gander, Gander & Gander to design the building under the Public Buildings Act of 1926, which gave treasury officials the option of hiring private architects for federal projects. Norman R. Sturgis served as associate architect. Notable New York City architect Electus Darwin Litchfield, who began his career with the renowned firm of Carrère and Hastings before establishing his own practice, served as consulting architect on the project and contributed major design concepts and aesthetic refinements. The architects designed the building in the Art Deco style, which was simultaneously Modern and decorative. When discussing the building, the architects used the term "modern classical" to describe their innovative design, instructing observers to "Squint your eyes, look in perspective and note the classical proportions of the building--minus columns and entablature."

The architects completed their plans in 1931 and the following year, the government awarded the construction contract to Kenny Brothers, Inc., of New York City. Prominent officials and the public gathered for a cornerstone-laying ceremony on August 18, 1933, and construction was completed in 1934, for a cost of $3,325,000 ($1,510,000 for the site and $1,815,000 for construction). The building had an exterior bridge connecting the nearby rail station with the post office, which occupied the entire first two floors.

In 1980, the building was listed in the National Register of Historic Places as a contributing building to the Downtown Albany Historic District. In 1988, it was renamed to honor Judge James Thomas Foley (1910-1990), who President Harry Truman appointed to the Northern District of New York in 1949. Foley served the federal courts for forty years, including a period as chief judge from 1963-1980 and senior judge from 1980 until his death.

The post office vacated the building in 1995. Current tenants include the U.S. District Northern Division of New York State, U.S. Bankruptcy Courts, United States Marshals Service, U.S. Customs and Border Protection, and the FBI.

== Architecture ==
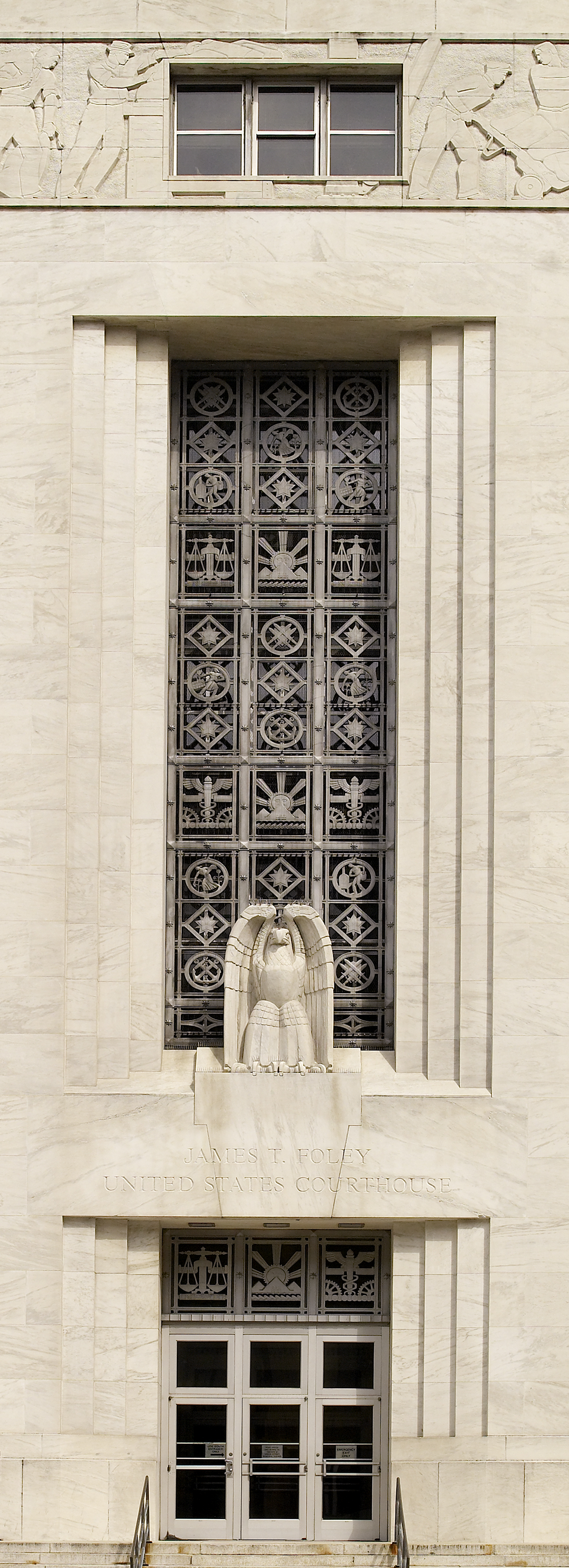
Entrance to James T. Foley United States Courthouse, with art by Albert T. Stewart (stone) and Benjamin Hawkins (aluminum)

The courthouse is an excellent example of Art Deco architecture, which incorporated sleek Modern forms while retaining ornate yet stylized decorative elements. The architects utilized high-quality materials on both the interior and exterior. The walls rest on a Bethel White granite base and are faced with Vermont Eureka marble above the water table. The building is built around two light courts that admit natural light into the interior. Vertical bands of windows with aluminum muntins emphasize the height of the five-story building. Black structural glass spandrels separate the windows on the facade.

The facade, which faces west on Broadway, contains two entrances, each topped with an eagle that is more than eight feet tall and carved from a seventeen-ton Vermont marble block by New York City sculptor Albert T. Stewart, who also received the commission for the building's frieze. Artist Benjamin Hawkins created ornate aluminum screens titled Departments of Government located behind the eagles. The screens contain stylized motifs representing the Departments of Navy, Agriculture, Labor, Army, Post Office, Commerce and Revenue, as well as images of the courts, thirteen stars representing the original colonies, and the New York state seal. A bas-relief frieze encircles the building on three elevations: the west facade contains images of postal service activities, the north elevation shows customs duties, and the south elevation illustrates the mission of the courts. To make the carvings visible to street-level viewers, Stewart created figures approximately eight feet tall and executed at a depth of nearly three inches.

Typical of the Art Deco style, the architects designed an opulent interior. Six marble types, including St. Genevieve Golden Vein, Rose, Champlain Black, Eagle Grey Tennessee, Eagle Pink Tennessee, and Verde Antique, are used on the richly appointed interior walls and floors. Ceilings are ornate plaster with medallions and stepped molding covered with aluminum leaf. Entrance vestibules lead to public lobbies with marble walls. Marble mosaic medallions are inset in the north and south lobby floors. A gilded plaster ceiling medallion of the United States Seal is centered in the lobby and framed by step moldings covered with aluminum leaf and gold stars.

Marble pilasters divide the main lobby into nine bays, each articulated with a ceiling mural. Artist Ethel M. Parsons painted the oil-on-canvas murals in 1935, depicting each of the seven continents as well as the North Pole and the United States. Interspersed with the murals are plaster plaques by Italian artist Enea Biafora Portraying famous Americans, including Abraham Lincoln, Benjamin Franklin, and George Washington, as portrayed on the earliest U.S. postage stamps. With the exception of the murals, the ceiling is covered with aluminum leaf. Four original black marble writing desks are centered in the main lobby.

Throughout the building, in both public and private spaces, intricate wood inlay designs adorn the ceiling and wall trim. Each of the five floors contains two elevator lobbies with adjacent public staircases. The stairs have treads and landings of Eagle Grey Tennessee marble with Champlain black marble risers. Cast-aluminum railings, also designed by Biafora, contain stylized motifs related to the functions of the building, including an airplane and scales of justice.

The two original courtrooms retain many original finishes and features. Both feature elaborate ornamentation on the wood walls and plaster ceilings. Courtroom No. 1, used for District Court proceedings since its construction, has Oregon maple burl paneling with exotic wood inlays and decorative aluminum grilles. The Courtroom Lobby retains original radiator grilles, bronze Art Deco light fixtures, and marble floor and walls. Two black-and-gold marble benches provide seating. Courtroom No. 2 features walnut burl veneer walls and Art Deco wall sconces.

When the post office vacated the building in 1995, much of their original workspace on the first and second floors was transformed to accommodate new uses, including renovated office space and the installation of a new courtroom.

== Significant events ==
- 1930 Congressional funding for new federal building allocated
- 1932 Construction begins
- 1934 Building completed
- 1980 Building listed in the National Register of Historic Places as part of Downtown Albany Historic District
- 1988 Building renamed to honor Judge James Thomas Foley
- 1995 U.S. Postal Service vacates the building

== See also ==
- Architecture of Albany, New York
- National Register of Historic Places listings in Albany, New York
