= Constantine George Cholakis =

American judge

Senior Judge of the United States District Court for the Northern District of New York
- In office June 30, 1996 – December 1, 1996

Judge of the United States District Court for the Northern District of New York
- In office March 17, 1986 – June 30, 1996
- Appointed by: Ronald Reagan
- Preceded by: Roger Miner
- Succeeded by: David N. Hurd

Personal details
- Born: Constantine George Cholakis; October 6, 1930 Troy, New York
- Died: December 1, 1996 (aged 66) North Greenbush, New York
- Party: Republican
- Education: Siena College (B.A.); Albany Law School (J.D.)

Constantine George Cholakis (October 6, 1930 – December 1, 1996) was a United States district judge of the United States District Court for the Northern District of New York.

== Education and career ==
Cholakis was born in Troy, New York. He was a non-commissioned officer in the United States Marine Corps in the Korean War from 1951 to 1953, and then entered college. He received a Bachelor of Arts degree in sociology from Siena College in 1955, and a Juris Doctor from Albany Law School in 1958. He was in private practice of law in Troy from 1958 to 1970, and he held various positions in the public sector. He was an assistant district attorney of Rensselaer County, New York from 1963 to 1965, and he was an assistant public defender for that county 1966 to 1967. He became district attorney in 1968, and held that position until 1974. He was then a county judge from 1974 to 1977, and was a justice of the New York Supreme Court, Third Judicial District, from 1978 to 1986. While on this court, his most famous ruling was to annul the suspension of the license of a physician who assisted in home births, a practice that New York's Department of Health had opposed.

== Federal judicial service ==
Although a lifelong Republican, he was initially reluctant to accept a national position in federal court. He agreed, however, to allow Senator Alfonse M. D'Amato recommend him for to a seat on the United States District Court for the Northern District of New York that had been vacated by Judge Roger Miner. On February 7, 1986, President Ronald Reagan nominated Cholakis. Cholakis was confirmed by the United States Senate on March 14, 1986, and received commission on March 17, 1986. He had a high reputation as an able and diligent judge, and an Albany Times Union survey among judges and lawyers rated him first for impartiality in 1994, and the "Con G. Cholakis Judicial Excellence award" was named in his honor, awarded each year in New York.

== Notable case ==
Cholakis' most famous ruling was to allow Libertarian candidate Robert L. Schulz to run for Governor of New York, even though Schulz had had numerous legal problems involving tax advice and compliance with election laws. This move angered many Republican leaders, since Schulz was seen as a threat to Republican George E. Pataki's candidacy. However, this helped to cement Cholakis' reputation as an impartial judge who valued fair rulings more than party loyalty.

== Later life and death ==
Cholakis assumed senior status on June 30, 1996 due to a certified disability, and died of an unspecified degenerative disorder in North Greenbush, New York, on December 1, 1996.

Legal offices
Preceded by Roger Miner	Judge of the United States District Court for the Northern District of New York; 1986–1996	Succeeded by David N. Hurd
