= George W. Ray =

American judge (1844–1925)

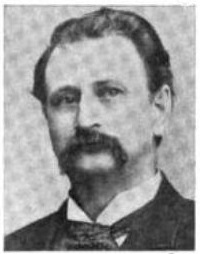

Judge of the United States District Court for the Northern District of New York
- In office September 12, 1902 – January 10, 1925
- Appointed by: Theodore Roosevelt
- Preceded by: Alfred Conkling Coxe Sr.
- Succeeded by: Seat abolished

Member of the U.S. House of Representatives from New York
- In office March 4, 1891 – September 11, 1902
- Preceded by: Milton De Lano
- Succeeded by: William H. Flack
- Constituency: 26th district
- In office March 4, 1883 – March 3, 1885
- Preceded by: Ferris Jacobs Jr.
- Succeeded by: Frederick A. Johnson
- Constituency: 21st district

Personal details
- Born: George Washington Ray; February 3, 1844 Otselic, New York
- Died: January 10, 1925 (aged 80) Norwich, New York
- Resting place: Mount Hope Cemetery; Norwich, New York
- Party: Republican
- Education: read law

George Washington Ray (February 3, 1844 – January 10, 1925) was a United States representative from New York and a United States district judge of the United States District Court for the Northern District of New York.

== Education and career ==
Born on February 3, 1844, in Otselic, Chenango County, New York, Ray attended the common schools and Norwich Academy. During the American Civil War, he served as a private in Company B of the Ninetieth New York Volunteers, and as a brigade clerk for the First Brigade, First Division, Nineteenth Army Corps. He was discharged at the close of the war. He read law and was admitted to the bar in November 1867. He then was a farmer and in private practice in Norwich, New York. He was Chairman of the Republican county committee of Chenango County and was a member of the Republican state committee in 1880.

== Congressional service ==
Ray was elected as a Republican from New York's 21st congressional district to the United States House of Representatives of the 48th United States Congress, serving from March 4, 1883, to March 3, 1885. Following his first term in Congress, he was a member of the board of education of Norwich Academy and Union Free School. He was elected from New York's 26th congressional district to the United States House of Representatives of the 52nd United States Congress and to the five succeeding Congresses and served from March 4, 1891, to September 11, 1902. He was Chairman of the Committee on Levees and Improvements of the Mississippi River in the 54th United States Congress, Chairman of the Committee on Invalid Pensions in the 55th United States Congress and Chairman of the Committee on the Judiciary in the 56th and 57th United States Congresses. He resigned from Congress to accept a federal judgeship.

== Federal judicial service ==
Ray received a recess appointment from President Theodore Roosevelt on September 12, 1902, to a seat on the United States District Court for the Northern District of New York vacated by Judge Alfred Conkling Coxe Sr. He was nominated to the same position by President Roosevelt on December 2, 1902. He was confirmed by the United States Senate on December 8, 1902, and received his commission the same day. On or about April 29, 1920, President Woodrow Wilson certified Ray involuntarily as disabled in accordance with the act of February 25, 1919, 40 Stat. 1156, which entitled the President to appoint an additional judge for the court and provided that no successor to the judge certified as disabled be appointed. Frank Cooper was appointed to the additional judgeship. Ray's service terminated on January 10, 1925, due to his death in Norwich. He was interred in Mount Hope Cemetery in Norwich.

== Sources ==
- "George Washington Ray". Biographical Directory of the United States Congress.

U.S. House of Representatives
Preceded by Ferris Jacobs Jr.	Member of the U.S. House of Representatives from New York's 21st congressional district 1883–1885	Succeeded by Frederick A. Johnson
Preceded by Milton De Lano	Member of the U.S. House of Representatives from New York's 26th congressional district 1891–1902	Succeeded by William H. Flack
Legal offices
Preceded by Alfred Conkling Coxe Sr.	Judge of the United States District Court for the Northern District of New York; 1902–1925	Succeeded by Seat abolished
