= Lawrence E. Kahn =

American judge (born 1937)

Senior Judge of the United States District Court for the Northern District of New York
- Incumbent
- Assumed office August 1, 2007

Judge of the United States District Court for the Northern District of New York
- In office August 1, 1996 – August 1, 2007
- Appointed by: Bill Clinton
- Preceded by: Neal Peters McCurn
- Succeeded by: Glenn T. Suddaby

Personal details
- Born: December 8, 1937 (age 88) Troy, New York, U.S.
- Education: Union College (AB); Harvard University (JD); Oxford University

Lawrence Edwin Kahn (born December 8, 1937) is an American attorney serving as a senior United States district judge of the United States District Court for the Northern District of New York.

== Education and career ==
Kahn was born in Troy, New York. He graduated from Union College with a Bachelor of Arts degree in 1959 and Harvard Law School with a Juris Doctor in 1962. He studied at Oxford University and then practiced law with his brother in Albany, New York, from 1963 to 1973. Kahn was also Albany's Assistant Corporation Counsel from 1963 to 1968. Kahn served as an Albany County Surrogate Court Judge from 1973 to 1979. In 1980, Kahn became a justice of the New York Supreme Court, on which he served until 1996. Since 1990, Kahn has served as an adjunct professor at Albany Law School, where he teaches courses on litigation in state and federal courts.

=== Federal judicial service ===
President Bill Clinton nominated Kahn to the United States District Court for the Northern District of New York on April 18, 1996, to fill the seat vacated by Neal Peters McCurn. Kahn was confirmed by the United States Senate on July 16, 1996, and received his commission on August 1, 1996. Kahn assumed senior status on August 1, 2007.

== Selected publications ==
- Kahn, Lawrence E. When Couples Part: How the Legal System Can Work for You. New York: Franklin Watts, 1981.
- Kahn, Robert W. & Lawrence E. Kahn, The Divorce Lawyers' Casebook. New York: St. Martin's Press, 1972.

Legal offices
Preceded by Neal Peters McCurn	Judge of the United States District Court for the Northern District of New York; 1996–2007	Succeeded by Glenn T. Suddaby
