= Anne M. Nardacci =

American judge (born 1977)

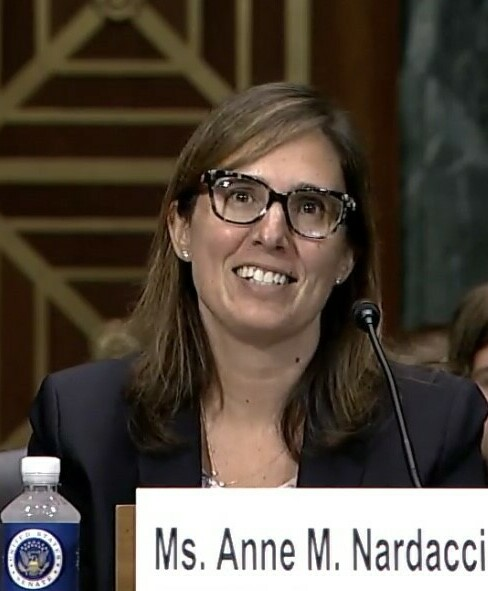

Judge of the United States District Court for the Northern District of New York
- Incumbent
- Assumed office December 16, 2022
- Appointed by: Joe Biden
- Preceded by: Gary L. Sharpe

Personal details
- Born: Anne Marie Torrey; 1977 (age 48–49) Albany, New York, U.S.
- Education: Georgetown University (BA); Cornell University (JD)

Anne Marie Nardacci (née Torrey; born 1977) is an American lawyer from New York who is a United States district judge of the United States District Court for the Northern District of New York.

== Education ==
Nardacci received a Bachelor of Arts, magna cum laude, from Georgetown University in 1998 and a Juris Doctor, cum laude, from Cornell Law School in 2002.

== Career ==
From 1999 to 2000, Nardacci served on the staff of Congressman Michael McNulty in Washington, D.C. From 2002 to 2005, Nardacci was an associate at Skadden, Arps, Slate, Meagher & Flom in New York City. From 2005 to 2022, she worked at the Albany, New York, office of Boies Schiller Flexner LLP; first as an associate from 2005 to 2012, then as a counsel from 2012 to 2020 and as a partner from 2020 to 2022. During her legal career, she specialized in anti-trust law.

=== Federal judicial service ===
On April 27, 2022, President Joe Biden announced his intent to nominate Nardacci after she had been recommended by U.S. Senator Chuck Schumer to serve as a United States district judge of the United States District Court for the Northern District of New York. On May 19, 2022, her nomination was sent to the Senate. President Biden nominated Nardacci to the seat vacated by Judge Gary L. Sharpe, who assumed senior status on January 1, 2016. On July 27, 2022, a hearing on her nomination was held before the Senate Judiciary Committee. Nardacci was given a majority "Qualified" rating by the American Bar Association, but was the first judicial nominee by President Biden to receive "Not Qualified" votes from the Standing Committee on the Federal Judiciary. On September 15, 2022, her nomination was reported out of committee by a 14–8 vote. On November 30, 2022, the United States Senate invoked cloture on her nomination by a 52–45 vote. Later that day, her nomination was confirmed by a 52–44 vote. She received her judicial commission on December 16, 2022.

Legal offices
Preceded by Gary L. Sharpe	Judge of the United States District Court for the Northern District of New York; 2022–present	Incumbent
