= Siena University (New York) =

Private university in Loudonville, New York, US

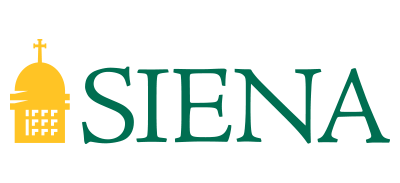
- Former names: St. Bernardine of Siena College (1937–1968); Siena College (1968–2025)
- Motto: The Education for a Lifetime
- Type: Private
- Established: 1937
- Religious affiliation: Roman Catholic (Franciscan)
- Academic affiliations: AFCU; CIC; MSA; ACCU
- Endowment: $200 million (2026)
- President: Charles Seifert
- Faculty: 350 (fall 2023)
- Students: 3,623 (fall 2023)
- Undergraduates: 3,497 (fall 2023)
- Postgraduates: 126 (fall 2023)
- Location: Loudonville, New York, U.S. 42°43′06″N 73°45′13″W
- Campus: Suburban, 174 acres (70 ha)
- Fight song: "When the Saints Go Marching In"
- Colors: Green and gold
- Nickname: Saints
- Sporting affiliations: NCAA Division I – Metro Conference
- Mascot: Bernie "Saint" Bernard (St. Bernard Dog)
- Website: www.siena.edu

Siena University, formerly Siena College, is a private Franciscan university in Loudonville, New York, United States. It was founded by the Order of Friars Minor in 1937 and is named after the Franciscan friar Bernardino of Siena. The university enrolls approximately 3,600 students and offers undergraduate and graduate programs through three schools in business, liberal arts, and science. Siena competes in NCAA Division I athletics as a member of the Metro Conference.

== History ==
What is now Siena University was established in 1937 by the Order of Friars Minor, a modest institution with a faculty of seven friars and one layperson operating out of the former Garrett estate in Loudonville, New York. Initially named St. Bernardine of Siena College, it received its provisional charter from the University of the State of New York in 1938 and was granted a permanent charter in 1942. The university is named for Bernardino of Siena, a 15th-century Italian Franciscan friar and preacher.

In the late 1930s, Thomas Plassmann, president of St. Bonaventure University in Western New York, sent seven Franciscan friars to New York's Capital Region to found another college.

Siena University carried out initiatives to enhance its academic programs, campus facilities, and student resources.

In 1950, Albert Mattingly became the first African American to graduate from the university (degree in chemistry): Albert Mattingly

A Grotto, along with a new bookstore, opened in 2014. A new rugby pitch was opened in fall 2016. In 2020, the college was listed as a census-designated place (Siena College CDP).

In May 2024, the university opened Patricia Gioia Hall, a 10,000-square-foot welcome center and academic facility designed for prospective student admissions and university programming.

In January 2025, Siena opened a $35 million science building. This includes laboratories and a nursing floor equipped with simulation tools.

In June 2025, the college's board of trustees voted to approve a name change to "Siena University". In July 2025, Siena College officially changed its name to Siena University.

== Academics ==
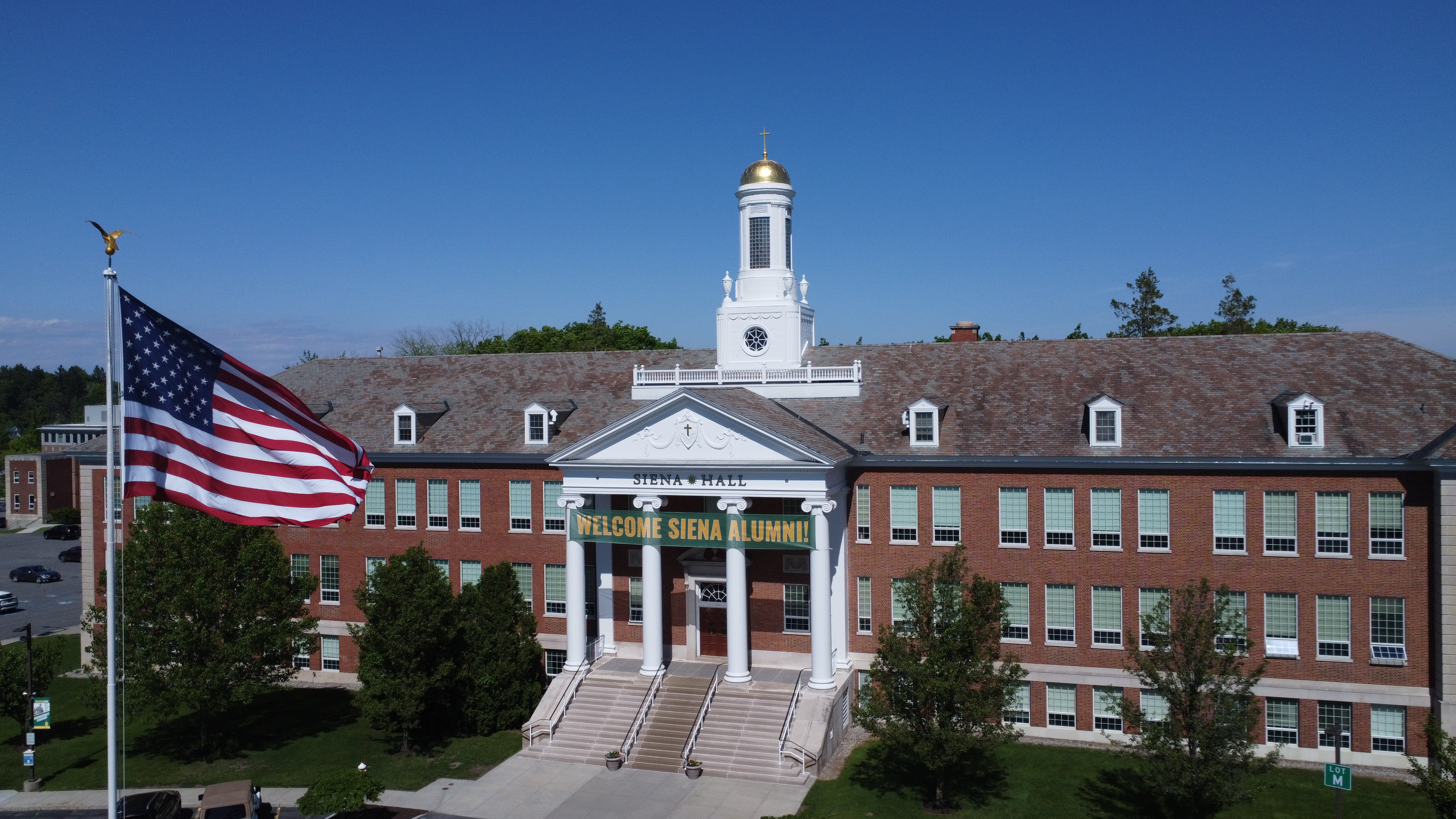
Siena Hall - May 2025

Siena University offers more than 40 majors, 80 minors and certificates, and graduate programs in business, education, and other fields. Students attend three schools within the university:

- School of Business
- School of Liberal Arts
- School of Science

Siena maintains joint degree and early-assurance academic partnerships, including the Siena-Albany Medical College Program in Humanities and Medicine, which guarantees admission to Albany Medical College for students focusing on the humanities and service.

The university is accredited by the Middle States Commission on Higher Education. The university also holds several program-level accreditations: the School of Business is accredited by the Association to Advance Collegiate Schools of Business, the Baccalaureate Nursing program by the Commission on Collegiate Nursing Education, the Education program by the Association for Advancing Quality in Educator Preparation, and the Bachelor of Social Work program by the Council on Social Work Education.

=== Rankings ===
In the 2025 Wall Street Journal/College Pulse "Best Colleges in the U.S." rankings, Siena was ranked 69th nationally and 6th in New York State. The university is also included in Money's 2026 "Best Colleges in America" ratings, which evaluate institutions on educational quality, affordability, and graduate outcomes. In the 2027 U.S. News & World Report rankings, Siena moved up five places to tie for #11 among Regional Universities in the North and ranked tied for #8 among Top Private Regional Universities in the North. Siena is also featured in the 2026 Forbes "America's Top Colleges" list, which reports a median 20-year alumni salary of $124,100.

== Siena Research Institute ==
Siena Research Institute, an affiliate of Siena University, conducts expert and public opinion polls, focusing on New York State and the United States, on issues of public policy interest.

== Student life ==
Student body composition as of Fall 2026
Race and ethnicity	Total
White	72%
Hispanic	10%
Asian	5%
Black	4%
Two or more races	4%
International student	3%
Unknown	1%
Economic diversity
Low-income (Note: The percentage of students who received an income-based federal Pell grant intended for low-income students.)	28%
Affluent (Note: The percentage of students who are a part of the American middle class at the bare minimum.)	72%

Siena is a primarily residential, suburban campus. 71% of undergraduate students live on campus. There are more than 80 student organizations.

The university operates WVCR-FM (88.3 “The Saint”), a noncommercial radio station licensed to Siena by the U.S. Federal Communications Commission. Student media also include a student-run campus newspaper and television station.

Siena has various housing options, including residence halls, private rooms, and townhouse units, across eight residential communities. Housing assignments for Siena students who live on campus are based on class year. Additionally, some students opt for off-campus housing at the College Suites or commute from nearby areas.

Approximately 90 student clubs and organizations range from academic and professional groups to cultural and recreational clubs.

== Athletics ==
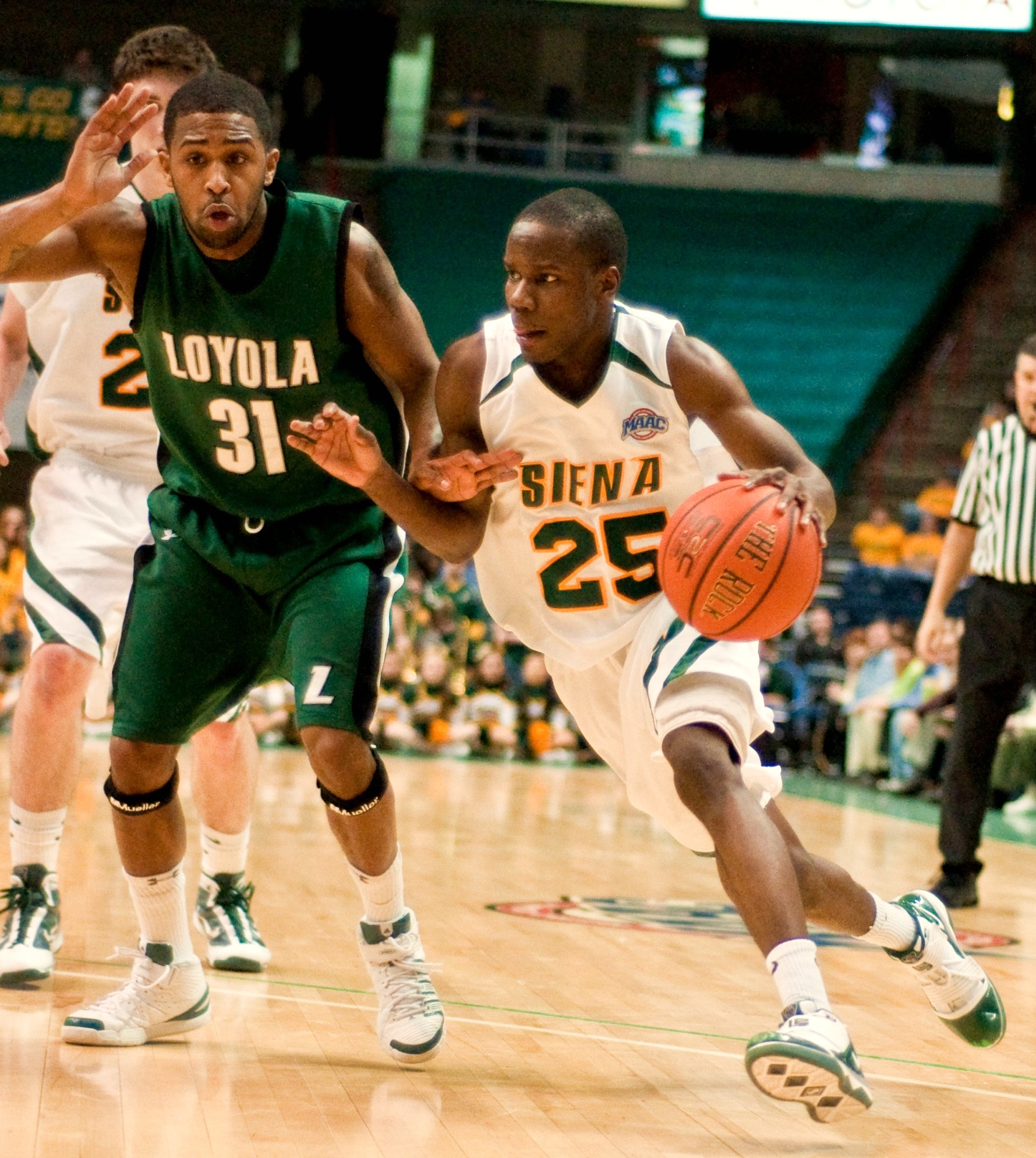
Siena guard Ronald Moore dribbles toward the basket in a game against Loyola in January 2010.

Siena sponsors 21 NCAA Division I sports, all of which compete in the Metro Conference.

=== Men's basketball ===
The men’s basketball program has earned eight NCAA Tournament berths (1989, 1999, 2002, 2008, 2009, 2010, 2010, and 2026), leading to national postseason success. The Saints have won four NCAA Tournament games, upsetting Stanford in their first appearance in 1989, while also defeating Alcorn State (2002), Vanderbilt (2008), and Ohio State (2009). In 2026, the Saints secured the program's eighth NCAA Tournament bid by winning the conference tournament championship in a 64–54 victory over Merrimack. Entered as a 16-seed in the tournament, Siena pushed No. 1 overall seed Duke to the wire before ultimately falling short in a 71–65 opening-round battle. Men’s basketball also captured the school’s first national postseason tournament title in 2014, winning the College Basketball Invitational.

The Saints play their home games at MVP Arena, where they have ranked in the top-100 nationally in attendance each season since making the move to downtown Albany beginning during the 1997–98 season, and have boasted the nation’s top average attendance amongst all Northeast mid-major programs three times.

=== Other sports ===
The baseball program has won five conference championships and holds Siena’s additional NCAA Tournament victory, defeating Dallas Baptist in 2014. A total of six Saints have played in Major League Baseball, with Brendan White (2023, Detroit Tigers), Matt Gage (2022, Toronto Blue Jays; 2023, Houston Astros), John Lannan (2007–12, Washington Nationals; 2013, Philadelphia Phillies; 2014, New York Mets), Tim Christman (2001, Colorado Rockies), Gary Holle (1979, Texas Rangers), and Billy Harrell (1955, 1957–58, Cleveland Indians; 1961, Boston Red Sox) all reaching the major leagues.

Volleyball leads all Siena programs with nine total conference championships, highlighted by a pair of four-peats (1993–96, 2005–08), before securing its most recent title in 2014.

Women’s basketball won the conference tournament championship in 2001, and has earned six national postseason tournament berths, appearing in the NCAA Tournament (2001), WNIT (1999, 2002, 2003, 2025), and WBI (2015). The Saints advanced to the Women’s Basketball Invitational Championship Game in 2015.

The men's lacrosse team qualified for their first conference tournament in 2007 and their first NCAA tournament in 2009. The program secured its fourth conference championship in 2025 by winning nine consecutive games to capture the crown, earning the program's first national ranking since 2011.

=== Facilities ===
Between 2016 and 2019, Siena University undertook a $13.5 million renovation project for the Alumni Recreation Center (now known as the UHY Center) and the Marcelle Athletic Complex (MAC). The multi-phase initiative included the construction of a new men's and women's basketball practice facility, seating and facility upgrades to the competition court, a new event entrance for women's basketball and volleyball, new student-athlete strength and conditioning and sports medicine suites, and an expanded and enhanced student, faculty, and staff fitness center.

The university is currently in the planning stages for a $4.5 million lacrosse complex, named Bice/Clive Field at the Paladini Family Lacrosse Complex. The project aims to provide dedicated space for the lacrosse programs while honoring the legacy of former lacrosse players Frank Bice and Colin Clive. The complex bears the name of 2004 alumnus Mike Paladini and his wife, Kerry, who competed on the Siena volleyball team.

== Notable alumni ==
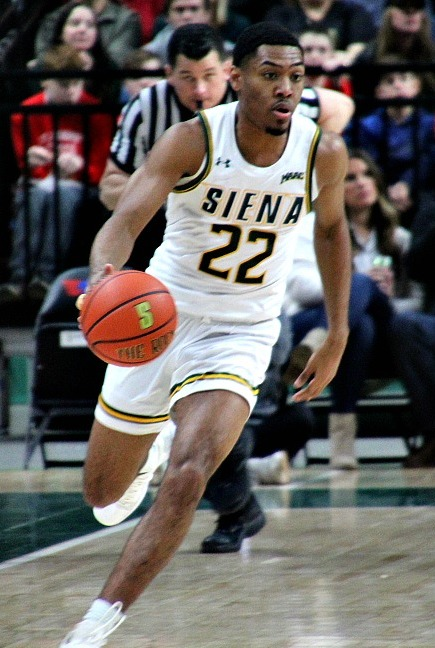
Jalen Pickett with the Siena Saints in 2019

=== Arts and entertainment ===
William J. Kennedy '49 is an American author and journalist who won the 1984 Pulitzer Prize for Fiction for his novel Ironweed. Wendy Moniz is an American television actress known for her roles in Guiding Light, Nash Bridges, The Guardian, House of Cards, and Yellowstone.

=== Politics and government ===
Christopher P. Gibson served as U.S. Representative for New York's 19th congressional district from 2013 to 2017 and New York's 20th congressional district from 2011 to 2013. George Deukmejian served as the 35th Governor of California from 1983 to 1991 and as Attorney General of California from 1979 to 1983. Anthony Brindisi, class of 2000, served as U.S. Representative from New York's 22nd congressional district from 2019 to 2021.

=== Law and judiciary ===
Mae D'Agostino is a United States District Court judge for the United States District Court for the Northern District of New York.

=== Sports ===
Jeff Hafley '01, who played wide receiver for the Saints from 1997 to 2000, was named the 12th head coach of the Miami Dolphins of the National Football League in January 2026. Jalen Pickett is a professional basketball player for the Denver Nuggets of the National Basketball Association (NBA).
