= Frederick Howard Bryant =

American judge (1877–1945)

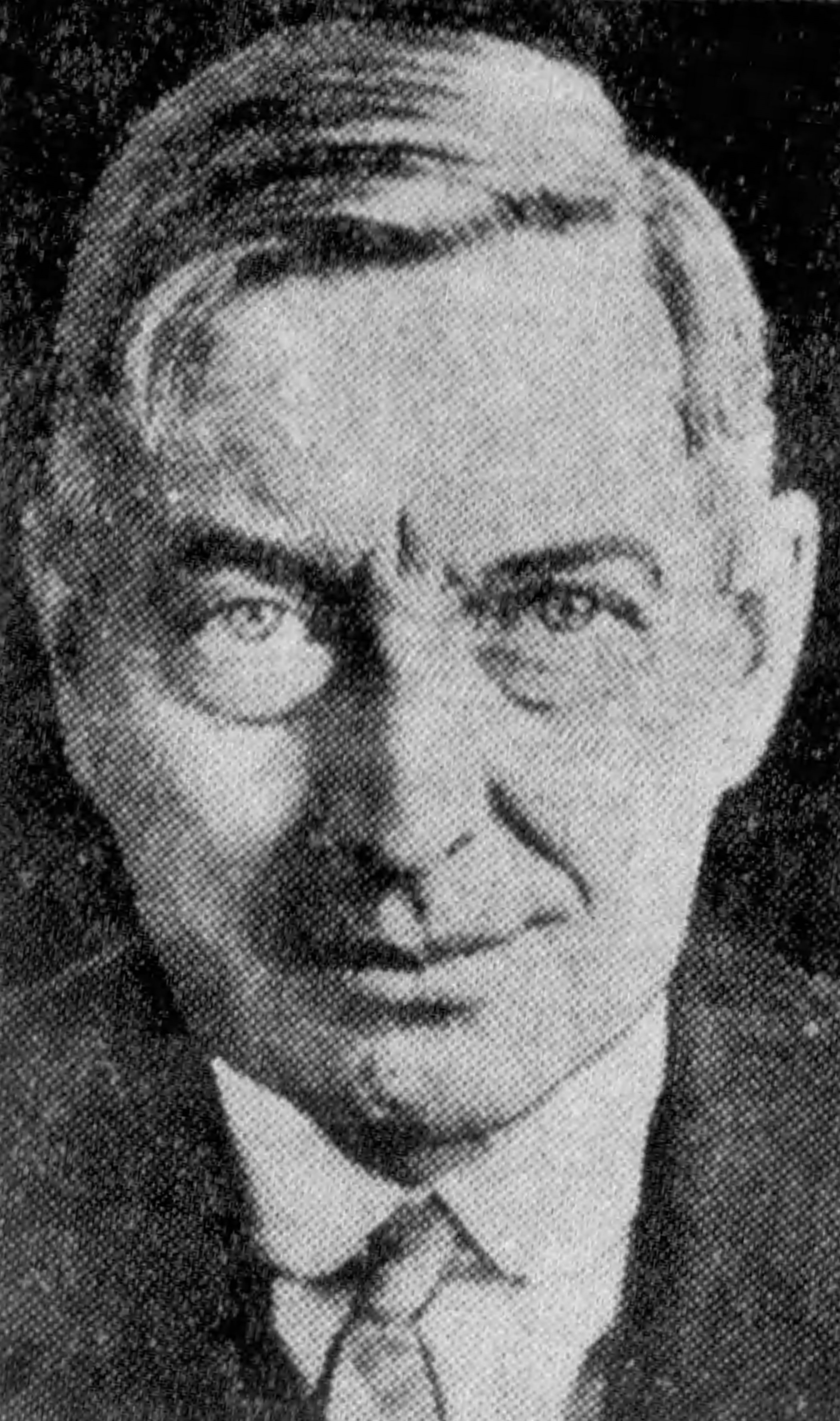

Judge of the United States District Court for the Northern District of New York
- In office May 19, 1927 – September 4, 1945
- Appointed by: Calvin Coolidge
- Preceded by: Seat established by 44 Stat. 1374
- Succeeded by: Edward S. Kampf

Personal details
- Born: Frederick Howard Bryant; July 25, 1877 Lincoln, Vermont
- Died: September 4, 1945 (aged 68) Malone, New York
- Education: Middlebury College (A.B.) read law

Frederick Howard Bryant (July 25, 1877 – September 4, 1945) was a United States district judge of the United States District Court for the Northern District of New York.

== Education and career ==
Born in Lincoln, Vermont, Bryant received an Artium Baccalaureus degree from Middlebury College in 1900. He read law in 1903 and went into private practice of law in Malone, New York until 1927.

== Federal judicial service ==
Bryant received a recess appointment from President Calvin Coolidge on May 19, 1927, to the United States District Court for the Northern District of New York, to a new seat authorized by 44 Stat. 1374. He was nominated to the same position by President Coolidge on December 6, 1927. He was confirmed by the United States Senate on December 19, 1927, and received his commission the same day. His service terminated on September 4, 1945, due to his death in Malone.

== Sources ==
Legal offices
Preceded by Seat established by 44 Stat. 1374	Judge of the United States District Court for the Northern District of New York; 1927–1945	Succeeded by Edward S. Kampf
