= Justice Brennan =

Justice Brennan may refer to:

- William J. Brennan Jr. (1906–1997), former Justice of the Supreme Court of the United States
- Gerard Brennan (1928-2022), former Chief Justice of Australia and former judge of the Hong Kong Court of Final Appeal
- Thomas E. Brennan (1929–2018), former Chief Justice of the Michigan Supreme Court and founder of the Thomas M. Cooley Law School

== See also ==
- Judge Brennan (disambiguation)
