= Rosemary S. Pooler =

American judge (1938–2023)

Senior Judge of the United States Court of Appeals for the Second Circuit
- In office March 23, 2022 – August 10, 2023

Judge of the United States Court of Appeals for the Second Circuit
- In office June 3, 1998 – March 23, 2022
- Appointed by: Bill Clinton
- Preceded by: Frank Altimari
- Succeeded by: Alison Nathan

Judge of the United States District Court for the Northern District of New York
- In office August 10, 1994 – June 9, 1998
- Appointed by: Bill Clinton
- Preceded by: Howard G. Munson
- Succeeded by: Norman A. Mordue

Justice of the New York State Supreme Court from the 5th Judicial district
- In office 1990–1994

Personal details
- Born: Rosemary Shankman; June 21, 1938 New York City, New York, U.S.
- Died: August 10, 2023 (aged 85) Syracuse, New York, U.S.
- Party: Democratic
- Education: Brooklyn College (BA); University of Connecticut (MA); University of Michigan (JD); University at Albany, SUNY (GradCert)

Rosemary Shankman Pooler (June 21, 1938 – August 10, 2023) was a United States circuit judge of the United States Court of Appeals for the Second Circuit.

== Early life and education ==
Pooler was born Rosemary Shankman in New York City on June 21, 1938. She earned a Bachelor of Arts degree from Brooklyn College in 1959, a Master of Arts from the University of Connecticut in 1961, and a Juris Doctor from the University of Michigan Law School in 1965. She also attended the Program for Senior Managers in Government of Harvard University in 1978, and earned a Graduate Certificate in Regulatory Economics from the State University of New York, Albany in 1978.

== Early career ==
Following graduation from law school, Pooler entered private law practice in Syracuse, New York. In 1972, she was appointed Director of the Consumer Affairs Unit in the Syracuse Corporation Counsel's Office, serving in that post for a year. From 1974 to 1975, she served on the Syracuse City Council. In 1975, she was appointed Chairman of the New York State Consumer Protection Board, serving until 1980. The following year, she was appointed to the state Public Service Commission. In 1987, she served as a committee staff member for the New York State Assembly. Following a stint on the faculty at Syracuse University College of Law, she served as Vice President of Legal Affairs at the Atlantic States Legal Foundation from 1989 to 1990.

=== Congressional campaigns ===
In 1986, Pooler decided to run for the United States House of Representatives in New York's 27th congressional district. She challenged conservative Republican incumbent George C. Wortley, who was seeking a fourth term. She campaigned aggressively and came within less than 1,000 votes of winning. In 1988, Wortley decided not to seek reelection. Pooler was considered a leading prospect of a Democratic gain. But her Republican opponent that year, Syracuse City Councilman James T. Walsh, was a much more difficult target for her attacks. Walsh won handily, with Pooler winning only 42% of the vote.

== Judicial career ==
=== Supreme Court of New York ===
In 1990, Pooler was elected as a Justice for the Fifth Judicial District of the Supreme Court of New York, serving until 1994.

=== Federal judicial service ===
Pooler was nominated by President Bill Clinton on April 26, 1994, to a seat on the United States District Court for the Northern District of New York vacated by Judge Howard G. Munson. She was confirmed by the United States Senate on August 9, 1994, and received commission on August 10, 1994. Her service terminated on June 9, 1998, when she was elevated to the court of appeals.

Pooler was nominated by President Clinton on November 6, 1997, to a seat on the United States Court of Appeals for the Second Circuit vacated by Judge Frank Altimari. She was confirmed by the Senate on June 2, 1998, and received commission on June 3, 1998. On October 7, 2021, Pooler announced she would assume senior status upon the confirmation of her successor. She assumed senior status on March 23, 2022. During her service on the court, she participated in a three-judge panel that ruled on the case of Ricci v. DeStefano, which was later appealed to the Supreme Court.

In May 2024, the Supreme Court ruled unanimously in the First Amendment case of National Rifle Association of America v. Vullo, favoring the NRA's case against New York insurance regulator Maria Vullo. The court overturned the decision of Pooler and her two fellow Second Circuit jurists, Denny Chin and Susan Carney.

=== Notable dissents ===
Pooler dissented in the 2009 ruling Arar v. Ashcroft, a case in which Maher Arar, a Canadian citizen, had been sent to Syria and was tortured there. While the majority found that there was no remedy for Arar, Pooler and three other judges would have granted Arar the declaratory judgment he was seeking. All four dissenters wrote their own dissenting opinion.

In August 2017, Pooler dissented when the court upheld the insider trading conviction of Mathew Martoma, in which she argued that the majority was improperly overruling circuit precedent. In June 2018, the majority issued an amended opinion reaching the same result, again over the dissent of Pooler.

In an August 2021 case regarding an unwarranted police search of a Black man, Pooler was one of three dissenters who argued that the search violates the 4th Amendment (the other 2 dissenters were Guido Calabresi and Denny Chin). Pooler noted that "The victims of police officers’ whims are disproportionately people of color. Black drivers are more likely to be pulled over by police officers than white drivers, and police officers search stopped black and Latino drivers twice as often as stopped white drivers, despite data suggesting searches of these black and Latino drivers are less likely to discover guns, drugs, or other illegal contraband."

== Death ==
Pooler died on August 10, 2023, at the age of 85.

== See also ==
- List of Jewish American jurists

Legal offices
Preceded by Howard G. Munson	Judge of the United States District Court for the Northern District of New York; 1994–1998	Succeeded by Norman A. Mordue
Preceded by Frank Altimari	Judge of the United States Court of Appeals for the Second Circuit; 1998–2022	Succeeded by Alison Nathan
