= Thomas James McAvoy =

American judge (born 1938)

Senior Judge of the United States District Court for the Northern District of New York
- Incumbent
- Assumed office September 17, 2003

Chief Judge of the United States District Court for the Northern District of New York
- In office 1993–2000
- Preceded by: Neal Peters McCurn
- Succeeded by: Frederick Scullin

Judge of the United States District Court for the Northern District of New York
- In office March 4, 1986 – September 17, 2003
- Appointed by: Ronald Reagan
- Preceded by: Seat established by 98 Stat. 333
- Succeeded by: Gary L. Sharpe

Personal details
- Born: September 17, 1938 (age 88) Johnson City, New York, U.S.
- Education: Villanova University (AB); Albany Law School (JD)

Thomas James McAvoy (born September 17, 1938) is a senior United States district judge of the United States District Court for the Northern District of New York.

== Education and career ==
McAvoy was born in Johnson City, New York and graduated from Villanova University with an Artium Baccalaureus degree in 1960 and Albany Law School with a Juris Doctor in 1964. A Republican, McAvoy was a practicing attorney in Binghamton, New York from 1964 to 1985. He was a member of the Broome County Legislature from 1971 to 1986.

=== Federal judicial service ===
McAvoy was recommended for a judicial appointment by Senator Al D'Amato. On January 29, 1986 he was nominated by President Ronald Reagan to the United States District Court for the Northern District of New York, to a new seat created by 98 Stat. 333. He was confirmed by the United States Senate on March 3, 1986, and received his commission on March 4, 1986. McAvoy served as chief judge from 1993 to 2000. He assumed senior status on September 17, 2003. As of September 2026, McAvoy appears to have gone inactive.

== Sources ==
- D'Amato Suggests Several as Judges, Arnold H. Lubasch, New York Times, February 24, 1985

Legal offices
Preceded by Seat established by 98 Stat. 333	Judge of the United States District Court for the Northern District of New York; 1986–2003	Succeeded by Gary L. Sharpe
Preceded by Neal Peters McCurn	Chief Judge of the United States District Court for the Northern District of New York; 1993–2000	Succeeded by Frederick Scullin
