= Anthony Brindisi =

American jurist (born 1978)

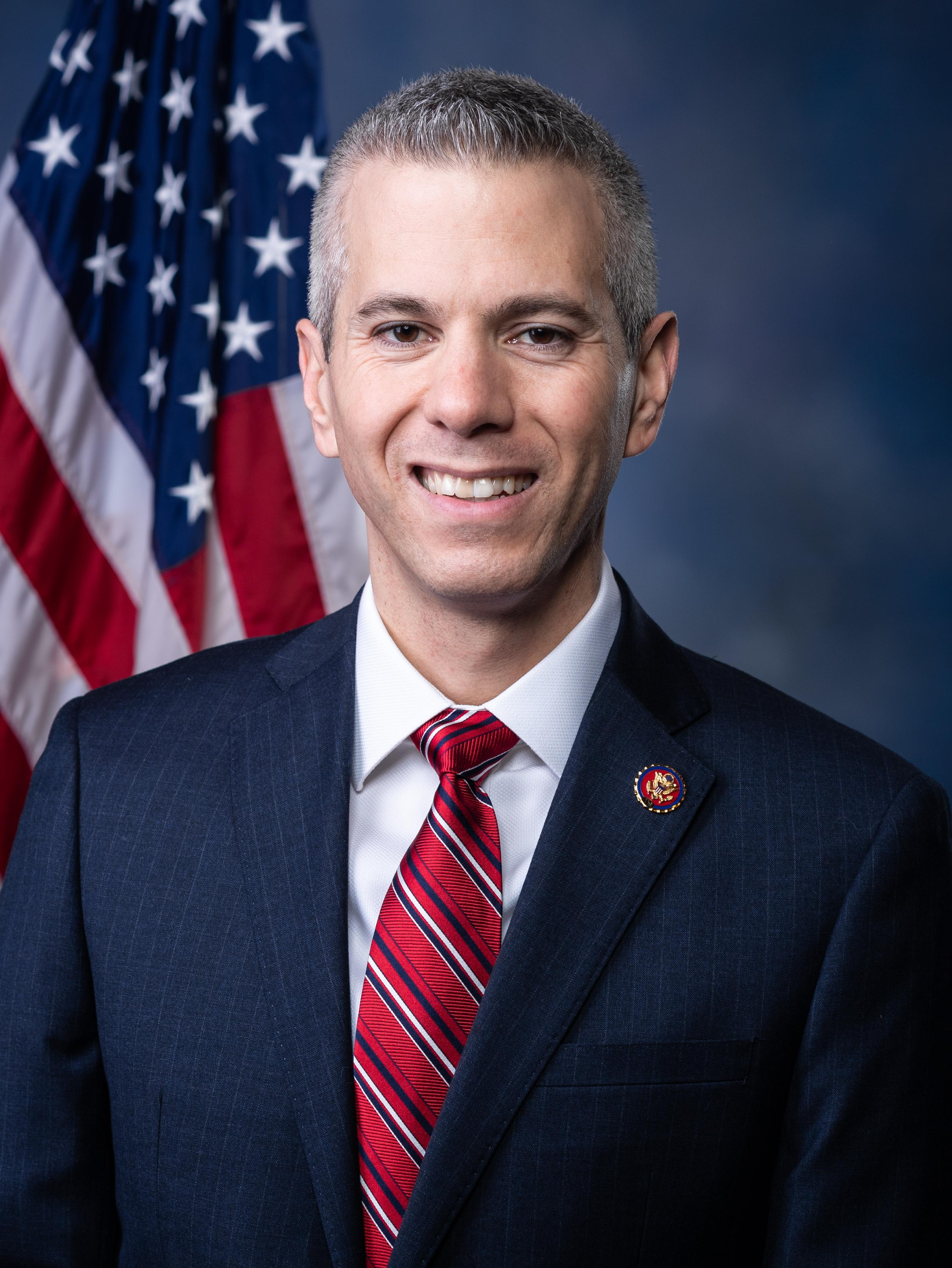
- Official portrait, 2019

Judge of the United States District Court for the Northern District of New York
- Incumbent
- Assumed office December 9, 2024
- Appointed by: Joe Biden
- Preceded by: David N. Hurd

Member of the U.S. House of Representatives from New York's 22nd district
- In office January 3, 2019 – January 3, 2021
- Preceded by: Claudia Tenney
- Succeeded by: Claudia Tenney

Member of the New York State Assembly from the 119th district
- In office September 14, 2011 – January 1, 2019
- Preceded by: RoAnn Destito
- Succeeded by: Marianne Buttenschon

Personal details
- Born: Anthony Joseph Brindisi; November 22, 1978 (age 47) New Hartford, New York, U.S.
- Party: Democratic
- Spouse: Erica McGovern
- Children: 2
- Education: Mohawk Valley Community College; Siena College (BA); Albany Law School (JD)

Anthony Joseph Brindisi (born November 22, 1978) is an American lawyer and politician from the state of New York. He serves as a United States district judge on the United States District Court for the Northern District of New York. Brindisi served as the U.S. representative from New York's 22nd congressional district from 2019 to 2021. He represented New York's 119th Assembly District from 2011 to 2019.

Before his election to the New York State Assembly, Brindisi served on the Utica School Board and practiced as an attorney. He was first elected to the New York State Assembly in a September 2011 special election. Brindisi narrowly defeated Republican U.S. Representative Claudia Tenney in the 2018 election in New York's 22nd congressional district. Tenney challenged Brindisi in 2020. Initially, the 2020 election was too close to call, and its results were challenged in court. On February 5, 2021, a state trial court judge declared Tenney the winner. After leaving Congress, Brindisi unsuccessfully sought election to the New York Supreme Court. He was later appointed to the New York Court of Claims by Governor Kathy Hochul in 2022 and to the United States District Court for the Northern District of New York by President Joe Biden in 2024.

== Early life and education ==
Brindisi was born on November 22, 1978, in New Hartford, New York, to Louis and Jacqueline Brindisi. He has five siblings. His great grandparents were from Mardin (present-day Turkey) and fled to Aleppo, Syria during the Armenian genocide. His mother died of cancer when he was four years old, on the same day that a murder took place at Louis's law firm. Louis gave up the practice of criminal defense law after the murder.

Brindisi graduated from Notre Dame Junior Senior High School in Utica, New York, and attended Herkimer County Community College and Mohawk Valley Community College before graduating from Siena College in 2000. He has said that the 2000 United States presidential election inspired him to become a lawyer. He attended Thomas M. Cooley Law School for a year, then attended Albany Law School of Union University, New York like his father. He received his J.D. degree in 2004. He joined the law firm his father founded and later won a seat on the Utica School Board.

== New York State Assembly ==
Following the appointment of Assemblywoman RoAnn Destito as Commissioner of the New York State Office of General Services, Brindisi won a special election to replace her to represent the 119th Assembly district, beating Republican Gregory Johnson in a September 13, 2011, special election. He was unopposed in the 2012 general election, running on the Democratic, Working Families Party, and Independence Party of New York State fusion ticket. He was also unchallenged in 2014 and 2016.

Brindisi voted against the NY SAFE Act, a 2013 gun control law written in response to the Sandy Hook Elementary School shooting. He was endorsed by the National Rifle Association of America in 2016, and the NRA also gave him a 100% rating in 2017. The NRA downgraded his rating to an F during his 2018 campaign for Congress.

== U.S. House of Representatives ==
=== Elections ===
==== 2018 ====
Brindisi ran for Congress in New York's 22nd congressional district, which was held by first-term Republican Claudia Tenney of nearby New Hartford. Tenney had served alongside Brindisi in the State Assembly from 2011 to 2017. Brindisi ran unopposed in the Democratic primary. He was endorsed by former Republican congressmen Richard Hanna and Sherwood Boehlert. The brand of Republicanism in central New York has traditionally been a moderate one, and Tenney was considered a staunch conservative and an outspoken supporter of President Trump.

On November 19, 2018, Brindisi declared victory. By November 20, his lead grew to over 3,900 votes, and there were not enough remaining absentee ballots for Tenney to close the gap. Tenney conceded on November 28. The 22nd voted for Donald Trump by a 15% margin over Hillary Clinton in 2016, the largest margin in any House district to change hands from a Republican to a Democrat in 2018.

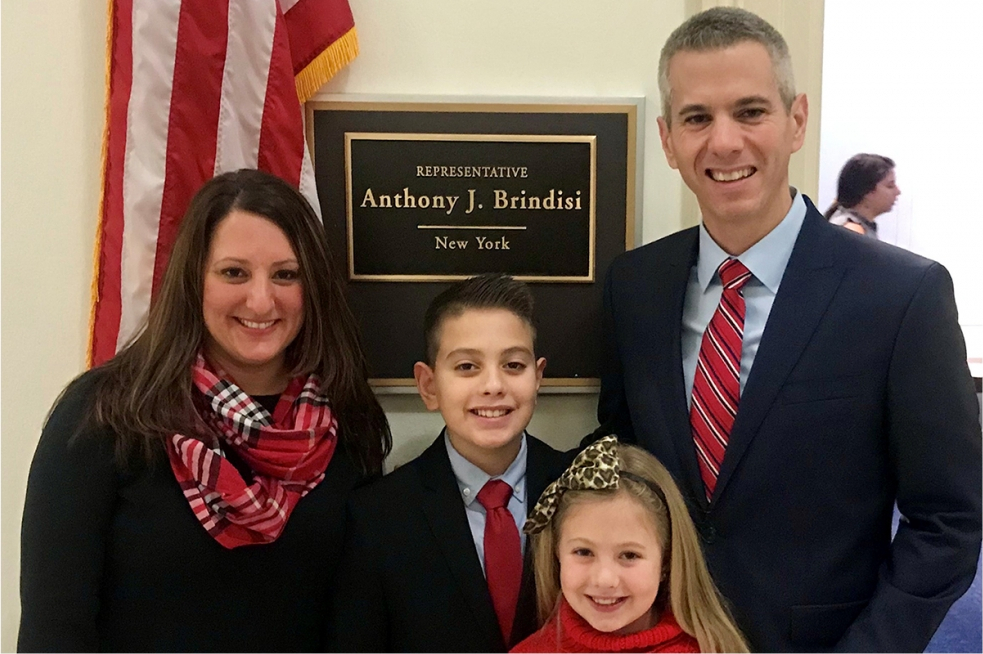
Brindisi with his wife and children in 2019

Upon his swearing-in on January 3, 2019, Brindisi became only the second Democrat to represent the district in 68 years, and the third in 119 years. The last Democrat to represent this district was Mike Arcuri, who represented what was then the 24th district from 2007 to 2011. Arcuri won with 54% of the vote, becoming only the second Democrat to represent this district and its predecessors in 106 years, and the first since 1951.

==== 2020 ====
Brindisi sought reelection to Congress in 2020. In October 2019, Tenney announced that she would challenge him. The initial election results were too close to call, and a court challenge ensued. On December 8, a New York state judge ordered a district-wide recanvass of all ballots, including provisional ballots and disputed ballots not included in the original count. By January 29, 2021, Tenney had a 122-vote lead over Brindisi based on unofficial tallies. On February 5, 2021, New York Supreme Court Judge Scott DelConte ruled in Tenney's favor, allowing her to be declared the winner of the election by 109 votes.

=== Tenure ===
On December 18, 2019, Brindisi voted to impeach President Donald Trump for abuse of power and obstruction of Congress.

=== Committee assignments ===
- Committee on Agriculture
  - Subcommittee on Biotechnology, Horticulture, and Research
  - Subcommittee on Livestock and Foreign Agriculture
- Committee on Veterans' Affairs
  - Subcommittee on Economic Opportunity
  - Subcommittee on Health
- Armed Services Committee
  - Subcommittee on Tactical Air and Land Forces
  - Subcommittee on Seapower and Projection Forces

=== Caucus memberships ===
- Blue Dog Coalition (Co-Chair for Whip)
- New Democrat Coalition
- Problem Solvers Caucus (former member)

== Judicial service ==
=== 2021 campaign for Supreme Court justice ===
In July 2021, Brindisi announced his candidacy for state Supreme Court. He lost the 2021 race for the 5th Supreme Court District to Republican Danielle Fogel.

=== New York State Court of Claims ===
In May 2022, Governor Kathy Hochul appointed Brindisi to the New York State Court of Claims.

=== Federal judicial service ===
On July 31, 2024, President Joe Biden nominated Brindisi to serve as a United States district judge for the United States District Court for the Northern District of New York. President Biden nominated Brindisi to a seat being vacated by Judge David N. Hurd, who announced his intent to assume senior status upon confirmation of a successor. On September 25, 2024, a hearing on his nomination was held before the Senate Judiciary Committee. During his confirmation hearing, he was questioned by Senator John Kennedy on the constitutional limits of the government speech doctrine. Brindisi could not say whether the government has free speech rights. He was also questioned by Senator Marsha Blackburn over his support for the New York Dream Act and by Senator Lindsey Graham over his past congressional co-sponsorship of the Equality Act. On November 21, 2024, his nomination was reported out of committee by an 11–10 party-line vote. On December 4, 2024, the United States Senate invoked cloture on his nomination by a 50–48 vote. Later that day, his nomination was confirmed by a 50–49 vote. He received his judicial commission on December 9, 2024.

== Electoral history ==
New York's 22nd congressional district, 2018
Party	Candidate	Votes	%
Democratic	Anthony Brindisi	116,001	46.2
Independence	Anthony Brindisi	5,673	2.3
Working Families	Anthony Brindisi	4,651	1.9
Women's Equality	Anthony Brindisi	1,390	0.5
Total	Anthony Brindisi	127,715	50.9
Republican	Claudia Tenney	110,125	43.9
Conservative	Claudia Tenney	12,061	4.8
Reform	Claudia Tenney	1,056	0.4
Total	Claudia Tenney (incumbent)	123,242	49.1
Total votes		250,957	100.0
Democratic gain from Republican			

New York's 22nd congressional district, 2020
Party	Candidate	Votes	%
Republican	Claudia Tenney	143,291	43.88
Conservative	Claudia Tenney	12,807	3.92
Total	Claudia Tenney	156,098	47.80
Democratic	Anthony Brindisi	138,898	42.53
Working Families	Anthony Brindisi	11,188	3.43
Independence	Anthony Brindisi	5,903	1.81
Total	Anthony Brindisi (incumbent)	155,989	47.77
Libertarian	Keith Price	6,780	2.08
Total votes		326,566	100.0
Republican gain from Democratic			

New York's 5th Supreme Court district, 2021
Party	Candidate	Votes	%
Republican	Danielle Fogel	102,144	56%
Democratic	Anthony Brindisi	85,219	44%
Total votes		194,059	100.0
Republican gain from Democratic			

== Personal life ==
Brindisi lives with his wife, Erica, and their two children in Utica.

U.S. House of Representatives
Preceded by Claudia Tenney	Member of the U.S. House of Representatives from New York's 22nd congressional district 2019–2021	Succeeded by Claudia Tenney
Legal offices
Preceded by David N. Hurd	Judge of the United States District Court for the Northern District of New York; 2024–present	Incumbent
U.S. order of precedence (ceremonial)
Preceded by John Faso as Former U.S. Representative	Order of precedence of the United States as Former U.S. Representative	Succeeded by Antonio Delgado as Former U.S. Representative
