= Alfred Conkling Coxe Sr. =

American judge (1847–1923)

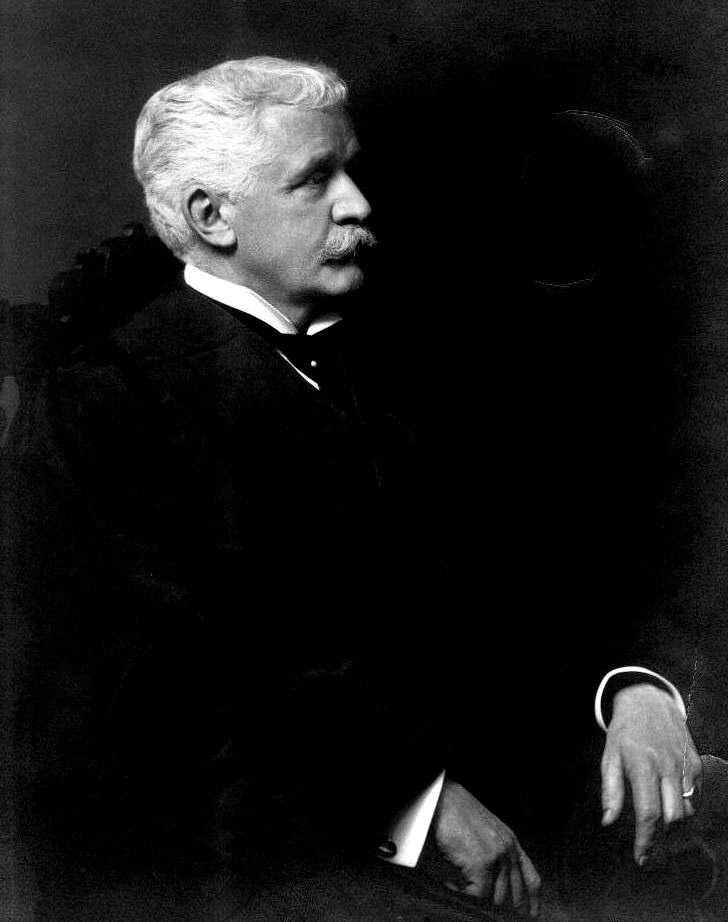

Judge of the United States Court of Appeals for the Second Circuit
- In office June 3, 1902 – July 31, 1917
- Appointed by: Theodore Roosevelt
- Preceded by: Seat established by 32 Stat. 106
- Succeeded by: Martin Thomas Manton

Judge of the United States Circuit Courts for the Second Circuit
- In office June 3, 1902 – December 31, 1911
- Appointed by: Theodore Roosevelt
- Preceded by: Seat established by 32 Stat. 106
- Succeeded by: Seat abolished

Judge of the United States District Court for the Northern District of New York
- In office May 4, 1882 – June 14, 1902
- Appointed by: Chester A. Arthur
- Preceded by: William James Wallace
- Succeeded by: George W. Ray

Personal details
- Born: Alfred Conkling Coxe; May 20, 1847 Auburn, New York
- Died: April 15, 1923 (aged 75) Hartford, Connecticut
- Relations: Samuel Hanson Cox (grandfather); Arthur Cleveland Coxe (uncle); Alfred Conkling (grandfather); Roscoe Conkling (uncle)
- Children: 5, including Alfred Jr.
- Parent(s): Samuel Hanson Coxe; Eliza Conkling Coxe

Alfred Conkling Coxe Sr. (May 20, 1847 – April 15, 1923) was a United States circuit judge of the United States Court of Appeals for the Second Circuit and of the United States Circuit Courts for the Second Circuit and previously was a United States district judge of the United States District Court for the Northern District of New York.

== Early life ==
Coxe was born on May 20, 1847, in Auburn, New York. He was a son of the Rev. Samuel Hanson Coxe (1819–1895) and Eliza (née Conkling) Coxe (1822–1868).

His paternal grandfather was the abolitionist minister Samuel Hanson Cox and his uncle was Arthur Cleveland Coxe, the Episcopal Bishop of Western New York. His maternal grandfather was Alfred Conkling, who served as a U.S. Representative from upstate New York and a judge in the Northern District. He was also a nephew of Roscoe Conkling, who was a U.S. Congressman and Senator from New York.

Coxe was educated at the Oxford Academy, the Utica Academy before attending Hamilton College. He later received an LL.D. from Columbia University.

== Career ==
Coxe read law in 1868. He entered private practice in Utica, New York from 1868 to 1882. In 1870 he entered the firm of Conkling, Holmes & Coxe of Utica with his uncle, Roscoe Conkling who was then a U.S. Senator, together with former Judge and U.S. Representative Sidney T. Holmes. He continued in private practice to 1882. He was manager of the Utica State Hospital from 1880 to 1882.

=== Federal judicial service ===
On April 24, 1882 Coxe was nominated by President Chester A. Arthur to a seat on the United States District Court for the Northern District of New York vacated by Judge William J. Wallace. He was confirmed by the United States Senate on May 4, 1882, and received his commission the same day. His service terminated on June 14, 1902, due to his elevation to the Second Circuit.

Coxe was nominated by President Theodore Roosevelt on May 29, 1902, to the United States Court of Appeals for the Second Circuit and the United States Circuit Courts for the Second Circuit, to a new joint seat authorized by 32 Stat. 106. He was confirmed by the Senate on June 3, 1902, and received his commission the same day. On December 31, 1911, the Circuit Courts were abolished and he thereafter served only on the Court of Appeals. His service terminated on July 31, 1917, due to his retirement.

== Personal life ==
Coxe was married to Maryette Andrews Doolittle (1852–1947), a daughter of Charles Hutchins Doolittle and Julia Tyler (née Shearman) Doolittle. Together, they were the parents of five children:

- Gertrude Doolittle Coxe (b. 1878), who married John Trumbull Robinson, a son of Henry Robinson of Hartford, Connecticut, in 1905.
- Alfred Conkling Coxe Jr. (1884–1970), who also became a federal judge, serving on the United States District Court for the Southern District of New York from 1929 to 1957; he married Helen Emery, a daughter of Woodward Emery of Boston, Massachusetts, in 1913.
- Isabel Elise Coxe (b. 1883), who married architect Louis Seabury Weeks, in 1913.
- Charles Shearman Coxe (1886–1955), who married Helen Osborn, daughter of the Rev. Louis Shreve Osborn of Salem, Massachusetts in 1913.
- Howard Cleveland Coxe (1897–1940), was a newspaperman and novelist.

Coxe died on April 15, 1923, in Hartford, Connecticut. His widow died in 1947.

=== Descendants ===
Through his son Charles, he was a grandfather of Louis Osborne Coxe (1918–1993), the poet and playwright best known for writing the Broadway version of Billy Budd.

== See also ==
- List of United States federal judges by longevity of service

== Sources ==
Legal offices
Preceded by William James Wallace	Judge of the United States District Court for the Northern District of New York; 1882–1902	Succeeded by George W. Ray
Preceded by Seat established by 32 Stat. 106	Judge of the United States Circuit Courts for the Second Circuit; 1902–1911	Seat abolished
Preceded by Seat established by 32 Stat. 106	Judge of the United States Court of Appeals for the Second Circuit; 1902–1917	Succeeded by Martin Thomas Manton
