= Roger Miner =

American judge (1934–2012)

Senior Judge of the United States Court of Appeals for the Second Circuit
- In office January 1, 1997 – February 18, 2012

Judge of the United States Court of Appeals for the Second Circuit
- In office July 22, 1985 – January 1, 1997
- Appointed by: Ronald Reagan
- Preceded by: Seat established by 98 Stat. 333
- Succeeded by: Robert D. Sack

Judge of the United States District Court for the Northern District of New York
- In office September 28, 1981 – August 2, 1985
- Appointed by: Ronald Reagan
- Preceded by: James Thomas Foley
- Succeeded by: Constantine George Cholakis

Justice of the New York Supreme Court
- In office 1976–1981

District Attorney of Columbia County
- In office 1968–1975

Personal details
- Born: Roger Jeffrey Miner; April 14, 1934 Hudson, New York, U.S.
- Died: February 18, 2012 (aged 77) Greenport, Columbia County, New York, U.S.
- Party: Republican
- Other political affiliations: Conservative
- Spouse: Jacqueline
- Children: 2
- Education: State University of New York at Albany (BS); New York Law School (LLB)

Roger Jeffrey Miner (April 14, 1934 – February 18, 2012) was an American lawyer and judge. He was a United States circuit judge of the United States Court of Appeals for the Second Circuit from 1985 until his death, and was previously a United States district judge of the United States District Court for the Northern District of New York from 1981 to 1985. Before his time as a federal judge, he was a New York Supreme Court justice from 1976 to 1981, and the district attorney of Columbia County, New York, from 1968 to 1975.

== Education and career ==
Miner was born on April 14, 1934, in Hudson, New York. He received a Bachelor of Laws from New York Law School in 1956. He received a Bachelor of Science from the State University of New York at Albany in 1977. He served as a Captain in the United States Army Judge Advocate General's Corps from 1956 to 1959. He was in private practice of law in Hudson from 1959 to 1975. He was corporation counsel for the City of Hudson, New York from 1961 to 1964. He was an assistant district attorney of Columbia County, New York in 1964. He was the district attorney of Columbia County from 1968 to 1975. He was an adjunct associate professor, Columbia-Greene Community College from 1974 to 1979. In 1975, he was elected a justice of the New York State Supreme Court on the Republican and Conservative party lines, and served from 1976 to 1981. He was an adjunct professor, New York Law School from 1986 to 1996. He was an adjunct professor of Albany Law School of Union University from 1997 until his death.

== Federal judicial service ==
Miner was nominated by President Ronald Reagan on July 28, 1981, to a seat on the United States District Court for the Northern District of New York vacated by Judge James Thomas Foley. He was confirmed by the United States Senate on September 25, 1981, and received commission on September 28, 1981. His service was terminated on August 2, 1985, due to elevation to the court of appeals.

Miner was nominated by President Reagan on June 25, 1985, to the United States Court of Appeals for the Second Circuit, to a new seat created by 98 Stat. 333. He was confirmed by the Senate on July 22, 1985, and received commission the same day. He assumed senior status on January 1, 1997, due to a certified disability, serving in that status until his death.

Future U.S. Senator Kirsten Gillibrand was a law clerk for Miner from 1992 to 1993.

=== Supreme Court consideration ===
In 1987 after Robert Bork’s Supreme Court nomination was rejected by the Senate, President Reagan considered appointing Miner. Miner was alongside eventual nominee Anthony Kennedy and Ralph K. Winter Jr. one of three candidates considered acceptable by the Senate’s Democratic majority under the leadership of Joe Biden and Robert Byrd. Miner was, however, opposed by some Senate Republicans, and drew strong opposition from anti-abortion and right-to-work groups, because of his refusal to state his position on abortion. The seat, formerly held by Lewis F. Powell Jr, ultimately went to Kennedy.

=== Notable case ===
In January 1987 Miner and Jon O. Newman heard Salinger v. Random House, deciding that with unpublished works the right of the copyright owner to control publication took precedence over the right of "fair use". This was interpreted as setting the right of an individual to privacy ahead of the public right to know.

== Death ==
Minber died from endocarditis at his home in Greenport, Columbia County, New York, on February 18, 2012, aged 77. He was survived by his wife, Jacqueline, two sons, two stepsons, and a brother.

== See also ==
- George H. W. Bush Supreme Court candidates
- List of Jewish American jurists

Legal offices
Preceded by James Thomas Foley	Judge of the United States District Court for the Northern District of New York; 1981–1985	Succeeded by Constantine George Cholakis
Preceded by Seat established by 98 Stat. 333	Judge of the United States Court of Appeals for the Second Circuit; 1985–1997	Succeeded by Robert D. Sack
