= Gary L. Sharpe =

American judge (1947–2024)

Gary Lawrence Sharpe

Senior Judge of the United States District Court for the Northern District of New York
- In office January 1, 2016 – February 12, 2024

Chief Judge of the United States District Court for the Northern District of New York
- In office December 16, 2011 – August 31, 2015
- Preceded by: Norman A. Mordue
- Succeeded by: Glenn T. Suddaby

Judge of the United States District Court for the Northern District of New York
- In office January 29, 2004 – January 1, 2016
- Appointed by: George W. Bush
- Preceded by: Thomas James McAvoy
- Succeeded by: Anne M. Nardacci

Magistrate Judge of the United States District Court for the Northern District of New York
- In office 1997–2004

Personal details
- Born: Gary Lawrence Sharpe; January 1, 1947 Cortland, New York, U.S.
- Died: February 12, 2024 (aged 77) Ballston, New York, U.S.
- Education: University at Buffalo (BA); Cornell University (JD)

Gary Lawrence Sharpe (January 1, 1947 – February 12, 2024) was an American lawyer who served as a United States district judge of the United States District Court for the Northern District of New York.

== Education and career ==
Sharpe graduated from the University at Buffalo with a Bachelor of Arts degree in 1971 and Cornell Law School with a Juris Doctor in 1974. He served as a senior assistant district attorney for Broome County, New York, from 1974 to 1981. He served as a special assistant attorney general for New York State, from 1981 to 1982. He served as an adjunct professor at Binghamton University and Broome Community College, from 1978 to 1982. He served as an assistant United States attorney, from 1982 to 1997, serving as a supervisory assistant United States attorney, from 1982 to 1992, interim United States attorney, from 1992 to 1994, and senior litigation counsel, from 1994 to 1997. He served as a United States magistrate judge for the Northern District of New York, from 1997 to 2004.

=== Federal judicial service ===
On April 28, 2003, President George W. Bush nominated Sharpe to the United States District Court for the Northern District of New York, to a seat vacated by Judge Thomas James McAvoy. He was confirmed by the Senate on January 28, 2004, and received his commission on January 29, 2004. He served as chief judge from December 16, 2011, until August 31, 2015. He assumed senior status on January 1, 2016.

== Death ==
Sharpe died on February 12, 2024, while surrounded by family. He was 77.

== Sources ==
Legal offices
Preceded by Thomas James McAvoy	Judge of the United States District Court for the Northern District of New York; 2004–2016	Succeeded by Anne M. Nardacci
Preceded by Norman A. Mordue	Chief Judge of the United States District Court for the Northern District of New York; 2011–2015	Succeeded by Glenn T. Suddaby
