= Elizabeth C. Coombe =

American lawyer (born 1967)

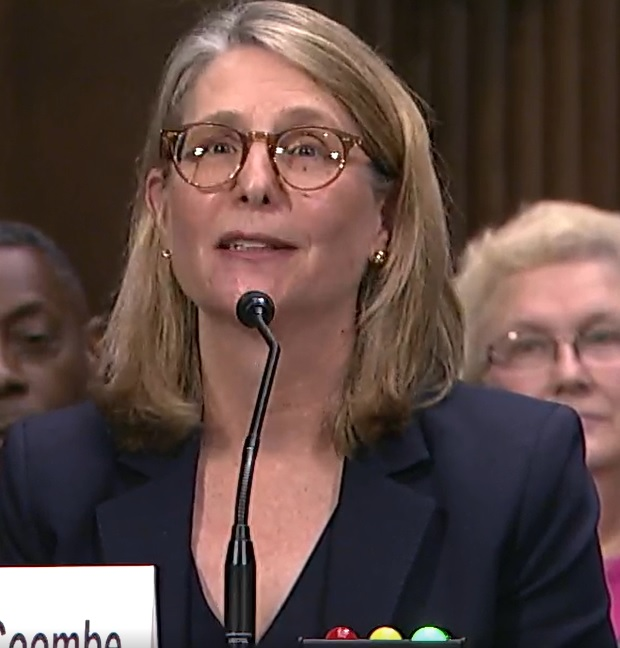

Judge of the United States District Court for the Northern District of New York
- Incumbent
- Assumed office December 9, 2024
- Appointed by: Joe Biden
- Preceded by: Glenn T. Suddaby

Personal details
- Born: Elizabeth Cheryl Coombe; 1967 (age 58–59) Ridgewood, New Jersey, U.S.
- Education: Hamilton College (BA); University of Michigan (JD)

Elizabeth Cheryl Coombe (born 1967) is an American lawyer who serves as a United States district judge of the United States District Court for the Northern District of New York.

== Education ==
Born in Ridgewood, New Jersey. She graduated from Tri-Valley Central School. She earned a Bachelor of Arts, summa cum laude, from Hamilton College in 1989 and a Juris Doctor, cum laude, from the University of Michigan Law School in 1992.

== Career ==
From 1992 to 1993, she served as a law clerk for Judge Diana E. Murphy of the United States District Court for the District of Minnesota. From 1994 to 1996, she was a staff attorney in the U.S. Securities and Exchange Commission's Enforcement Division; from 1996 to 1997, she was a trial attorney in the U.S. Department of Justice's Civil Division, Commercial Litigation Branch and from 1998 to 2003 she served as an assistant United States attorney in the U.S. Attorney's Office for the District of Columbia. She joined the office in 2003 and from 2014 to 2018, she served as chief of the criminal division, becoming the first woman to do so. From 2018 to 2024, served as the first assistant United States attorney in the U.S. Attorney's Office for the Northern District of New York.

=== Federal judicial service ===
On August 28, 2024, President Joe Biden announced his intent to nominate Coombe to serve as a United States district judge of the United States District Court for the Northern District of New York. On September 9, 2024, her nomination was sent to the Senate. President Biden nominated Coombe to the seat being vacated by Judge Glenn T. Suddaby, who subsequently assumed senior status on September 1, 2024. Senator Kirsten Gillibrand endorsed Coombe's nomination. On September 25, 2024, a hearing on her nomination was held before the Senate Judiciary Committee. On November 21, 2024, her nomination was reported out of committee by an 11–10 party-line vote. On December 4, 2024, the United States Senate invoked cloture on her nomination by a 52–46 vote. Later that day, her nomination was confirmed by a 52–45 vote. She received her judicial commission on December 9, 2024.

Legal offices
Preceded by Glenn T. Suddaby	Judge of the United States District Court for the Northern District of New York; 2024–present	Incumbent
