= Edward S. Kampf =

American judge (1900–1971)

Judge of the United States District Court for the Northern District of New York
- In office February 8, 1946 – July 1, 1948
- Appointed by: Harry S. Truman
- Preceded by: Frederick Howard Bryant
- Succeeded by: James Thomas Foley

Personal details
- Born: Edward S. Kampf; October 14, 1900 Albany, New York
- Died: March 8, 1971 (aged 70) Miami, Florida
- Education: Albany Law School (LL.B.)

Edward S. Kampf (October 14, 1900 – March 8, 1971) was a United States district judge of the United States District Court for the Northern District of New York.

== Education and career ==
Born in Albany, New York, Kampf received a Bachelor of Laws from Albany Law School in 1924. He was a law clerk for New York State Senator William T. Byrne from 1924 to 1925. He was a member of the Albany County Board of Supervisors from 1931 to 1935. He was a Judge of the Albany Police Court from 1935 to 1945.

== Federal judicial service ==
Kampf was nominated by President Harry S. Truman on January 17, 1946, to a seat on the United States District Court for the Northern District of New York vacated by Judge Frederick Howard Bryant. He was confirmed by the United States Senate on February 5, 1946, and received his commission on February 8, 1946. His service was terminated on July 1, 1948, due to his resignation.

== Post judicial service ==
Following his resignation from the federal bench, Kampf engaged in private practice of law in Albany, New York from 1948 to 1961. He died on March 8, 1971, in Miami, Florida.

== Sources ==
Legal offices
Preceded by Frederick Howard Bryant	Judge of the United States District Court for the Northern District of New York; 1946–1948	Succeeded by James Thomas Foley
