= Brenda K. Sannes =

American judge (born 1958)

Brenda Sannes
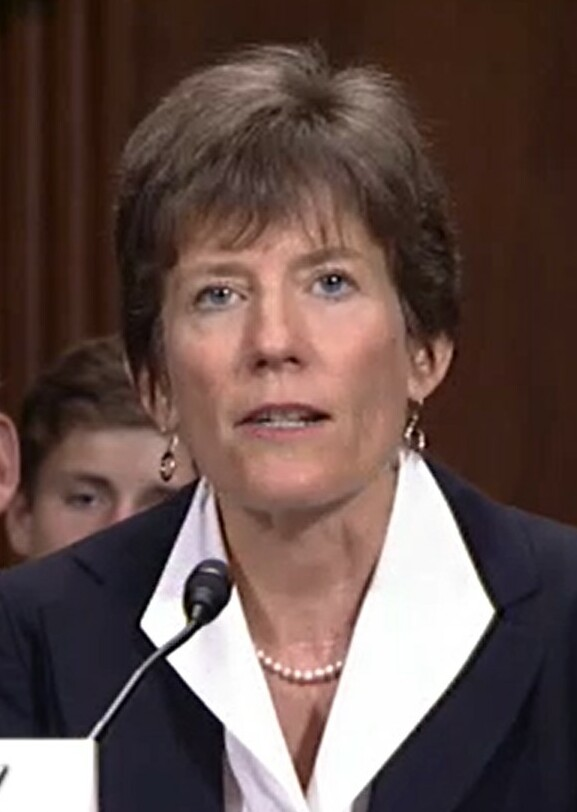
- Sannes in 2014

Chief Judge of the United States District Court for the Northern District of New York
- Incumbent
- Assumed office August 31, 2022
- Preceded by: Glenn T. Suddaby

Judge of the United States District Court for the Northern District of New York
- Incumbent
- Assumed office November 21, 2014
- Appointed by: Barack Obama
- Preceded by: Norman A. Mordue

Personal details
- Born: 1958 (age 67–68) Billings, Montana, U.S.
- Education: Carleton College (BA); University of Wisconsin, Madison (JD)

Brenda Kay Sannes (born 1958) is an American lawyer who serves as the chief United States district judge of the United States District Court for the Northern District of New York. She is a former assistant United States attorney who served from 1988 to 2014.

== Biography ==
Sannes received a Bachelor of Arts degree, magna cum laude, in 1980 from Carleton College. She received a Juris Doctor in 1983 from the University of Wisconsin Law School. She served as a law clerk to Judge Jerome Farris of the United States Court of Appeals for the Ninth Circuit, from 1983 to 1984. From 1984 to 1988, she worked at the law firm of Wyman, Bautzer, Christensen, Kuchel & Silbert in Los Angeles. She served as an assistant United States attorney for the Central District of California, from 1988 to 1994, later serving a two-year detail in that office from 2003 to 2005. From 1995 to 2014, she served as an assistant United States attorney in the Northern District of New York, serving as chief of the Appellate Section from 2005 to 2014.

=== Federal judicial service ===
On May 8, 2014, President Barack Obama nominated Sannes to serve as a United States district judge of the United States District Court for the Northern District of New York, to the seat vacated by Judge Norman A. Mordue, who assumed senior status on June 30, 2013. She received a hearing on her nomination on June 24, 2014. On July 17, 2014, her nomination was reported out of committee by a voice vote. On November 18, 2014, Senate Majority Leader Harry Reid filed for cloture on her nomination. On November 19, 2014, the United States Senate invoked cloture on her nomination by a 55–42 vote. On November 20, 2014, her nomination was confirmed by a 96–0 vote. She received her judicial commission on November 21, 2014. Sannes became chief judge on August 31, 2022.

In August 2026, Sannes ruled that the 2024 New York Climate Change Superfund Act, a law that would tax fossil fuel companies to pay for climate change adaptive infrastructure projects, could not be enforced, calling it "beyond the limits of state law".

Legal offices
Preceded by Norman A. Mordue	Judge of the United States District Court for the Northern District of New York; 2014–present	Incumbent
Preceded by Glenn T. Suddaby	Chief Judge of the United States District Court for the Northern District of New York; 2022–present	Incumbent
