= Neal Peters McCurn =

American judge

Senior Judge of the United States District Court for the Northern District of New York
- In office April 6, 1993 – September 7, 2014

Chief Judge of the United States District Court for the Northern District of New York
- In office 1988–1993
- Preceded by: Howard G. Munson
- Succeeded by: Thomas James McAvoy

Judge of the United States District Court for the Northern District of New York
- In office November 2, 1979 – April 6, 1993
- Appointed by: Jimmy Carter
- Preceded by: Seat established by 92 Stat. 1629
- Succeeded by: Lawrence E. Kahn

Personal details
- Born: Neal Peters McCurn; April 6, 1926 Syracuse, New York
- Died: September 7, 2014 (aged 88) Syracuse, New York
- Education: Syracuse University (AB); Syracuse University College of Law (LLB)

Neal Peters McCurn (April 6, 1926 – September 7, 2014) was a United States district judge of the United States District Court for the Northern District of New York from 1979 to 2014 and Chief Judge from 1988 to 1993.

== Education and career ==
Born in Syracuse, New York, McCurn received an Artium Baccalaureus degree from Syracuse University in 1950. He received a Bachelor of Laws from Syracuse University College of Law in 1952. He served in the United States Naval Reserve as a Cadet-Midshipman from 1944 to 1946. He was in private practice of law in Syracuse from 1952 to 1979. He was the President of the City of Syracuse Common Council in New York from 1968 to 1979.

== Federal judicial service ==
McCurn was nominated by President Jimmy Carter on September 28, 1979, to the United States District Court for the Northern District of New York, to a new seat created by 92 Stat. 1629. He was confirmed by the United States Senate on October 31, 1979, and received his commission on November 2, 1979. He served as Chief Judge from 1988 to 1993. He assumed senior status on April 6, 1993, serving in that status until his death on September 7, 2014, in Syracuse.

== Sources ==
Legal offices
Preceded by Seat established by 92 Stat. 1629	Judge of the United States District Court for the Northern District of New York; 1979–1993	Succeeded by Lawrence E. Kahn
Preceded by Howard G. Munson	Chief Judge of the United States District Court for the Northern District of New York; 1988–1993	Succeeded by Thomas James McAvoy
