= Frederick Scullin =

American judge (born 1939)

Frederick James Scullin Jr.

Senior Judge of the United States District Court for the Northern District of New York
- Incumbent
- Assumed office March 13, 2006

Chief Judge of the United States District Court for the Northern District of New York
- In office 2000–2006
- Preceded by: Thomas James McAvoy
- Succeeded by: Norman A. Mordue

Judge of the United States District Court for the Northern District of New York
- In office February 10, 1992 – March 13, 2006
- Appointed by: George H. W. Bush
- Preceded by: Seat established by 104 Stat. 5089
- Succeeded by: Mae D'Agostino

Personal details
- Born: Frederick James Scullin Jr. November 5, 1939 (age 86) Syracuse, New York, U.S.
- Education: Niagara University (BS); Syracuse University (LLB)

Frederick James Scullin Jr. (born November 5, 1939) is an American lawyer who serves as a senior United States district judge of the United States District Court for the Northern District of New York.

== Education and career ==
Scullin was born in Syracuse, New York. He attended Niagara University where he received a Bachelor of Science in 1961, and he graduated from Syracuse University College of Law with a Bachelor of Laws in 1964. After graduating from law school, Scullin served in the United States Army as an Infantry Commander in Vietnam. Scullin practiced law as a private attorney and in various prosecutors' offices from 1967 to 1982. In 1982 he was appointed United States Attorney for the Northern District of New York by President Ronald Reagan. He served in the position for ten years until 1992.

=== Federal judicial service ===
On September 12, 1991, Scullin was nominated to the United States District Court for the Northern District of New York by President George H. W. Bush. He was confirmed by the United States Senate on February 6, 1992, and received his commission on February 10, 1992. He served as Chief Judge of the District from 2000 until March 13, 2006, when he assumed senior status.

Scullin was also appointed by Chief Justice Rehnquist to the United States Foreign Intelligence Surveillance Court for a term of seven years running from 2004 until 2011.

=== Notable case ===
On July 26, 2014, Judge Scullin struck down the District of Columbia's ban on carrying handguns outside of a person's home, saying that the ban violated the Second Amendment. He wrote that "there is no longer any basis on which this court can conclude that the District of Columbia's total ban on the public carrying of ready-to-use handguns outside the home is constitutional under any level of scrutiny." In response to the ruling, the D.C. Metropolitan Police determined that non-residents bearing firearms in the district are subject to the handgun laws of their home jurisdiction; in effect, this makes the District much more permissive of firearms. On July 29, 2014, in response to a partially unopposed motion filed by the District of Columbia, Judge Scullin issued a 90-day stay of his initial order. The stay expired on November 28, 2014.

== Sources ==
- Official biography from the District Court

Legal offices
Preceded by Seat established by 104 Stat. 5089	Judge of the United States District Court for the Northern District of New York; 1992–2006	Succeeded by Mae D'Agostino
Preceded by Thomas James McAvoy	Chief Judge of the United States District Court for the Northern District of New York; 2000–2006	Succeeded by Norman A. Mordue
