= Edmund Port =

American judge

Senior Judge of the United States District Court for the Northern District of New York
- In office February 7, 1976 – March 2, 1986

Judge of the United States District Court for the Northern District of New York
- In office July 2, 1964 – February 7, 1976
- Appointed by: Lyndon B. Johnson
- Preceded by: Stephen W. Brennan
- Succeeded by: Howard G. Munson

Personal details
- Born: Edmund Port; February 6, 1906 Syracuse, New York
- Died: March 2, 1986 (aged 80) New Smyrna Beach, Florida
- Education: Syracuse University College of Law (LL.B.)

Edmund Port (February 6, 1906 – March 2, 1986) was a United States district judge of the United States District Court for the Northern District of New York.

== Education and career ==
Born in Syracuse, New York, Port received a Bachelor of Laws from Syracuse University College of Law in 1929. He was in private practice of law in Syracuse from 1929 to 1932. He was hospitalized for tuberculosis and convalesced from 1932 to 1934. He returned to private practice in Syracuse from 1934 to 1953, as well as working as an Attorney and District Compensation Officer for the Works Progress Administration and the Civilian Conservation Corps from 1935 to 1938. He also worked as a rent attorney for the Office of Price Administration in Syracuse from 1942 to 1943 as well as an Assistant United States Attorney for the Northern District of New York from 1943 to 1951. He was promoted to the United States Attorney for the Northern District of New York in 1951 and stayed in that position until 1953. After this period, he moved back to practicing private law in Auburn, New York from 1953 to 1964.

== Federal judicial service ==
Port was nominated by President Lyndon B. Johnson on April 30, 1964, to a seat on the United States District Court for the Northern District of New York vacated by Judge Stephen W. Brennan. He was confirmed by the United States Senate on July 1, 1964, and received his commission on July 2, 1964. He assumed senior status on February 7, 1976. His service was terminated on March 2, 1986, due to his death in New Smyrna Beach, Florida.

== See also ==
- List of Jewish American jurists

== Sources ==
Legal offices
Preceded by Stephen W. Brennan	Judge of the United States District Court for the Northern District of New York; 1964–1976	Succeeded by Howard G. Munson
