= Glenn T. Suddaby =

American judge (born 1956)

Glenn Thomas Suddaby

Senior Judge of the United States District Court for the Northern District of New York
- Incumbent
- Assumed office September 1, 2024

Chief Judge of the United States District Court for the Northern District of New York
- In office August 31, 2015 – August 31, 2022
- Preceded by: Gary L. Sharpe
- Succeeded by: Brenda K. Sannes

Judge of the United States District Court for the Northern District of New York
- In office August 29, 2008 – September 1, 2024
- Appointed by: George W. Bush
- Preceded by: Lawrence E. Kahn
- Succeeded by: Elizabeth C. Coombe

United States Attorney for the Northern District of New York
- In office October 25, 2002 – September 5, 2008
- President: George W. Bush
- Preceded by: Joseph A. Pavone
- Succeeded by: Andrew T. Baxter

Personal details
- Born: Glenn Thomas Suddaby; 1956 (age 69–70) Glens Falls, New York, U.S.
- Education: State University of New York at Plattsburgh (BA); Syracuse University (JD)

Glenn Thomas Suddaby (born 1956) is a senior United States district judge of the United States District Court for the Northern District of New York.

== Biography ==
Suddaby was born in Glens Falls, New York. He received a Bachelor of Arts degree from State University of New York at Plattsburgh in 1980 and a Juris Doctor from Syracuse University College of Law in 1985. He was an Assistant district attorney of Onondaga County District Attorney's Office from 1985 to 1989. He was in private practice in Syracuse, New York, from 1989 to 1992. He was a first chief assistant district attorney of Onondaga County District Attorney's Office, New York from 1992 to 2002. He was the United States attorney for the Northern District of New York from 2002 to 2008.

=== Federal judicial service ===
Suddaby was nominated to serve as a United States district judge of the United States District Court for the Northern District of New York by President George W. Bush on December 11, 2007. He was nominated to a seat vacated by Judge Lawrence E. Kahn. He was confirmed by the United States Senate on July 22, 2008, and received commission on August 29, 2008. He served as chief judge from August 31, 2015 to August 31, 2022. He assumed senior status on September 1, 2024.

In July of 2026, Suddaby sentenced chinese immigrant ride-share driver Wenjian Zhuo to 27 months in prison for attempting to smuggle a large amount of marijuana into New York. The family man and father of two was unaware of the fact he was transporting drugs after a would-be passenger unloaded packages into his vehicle and asked him to bring them to New York.

== Sources ==
Legal offices
Preceded by Joseph A. Pavone	United States Attorney for the Northern District of New York; 2002–2008	Succeeded by Andrew T. Baxter
Preceded by Lawrence E. Kahn	Judge of the United States District Court for the Northern District of New York; 2008–2024	Succeeded by Elizabeth C. Coombe
Preceded by Gary L. Sharpe	Chief Judge of the United States District Court for the Northern District of New York; 2015–2022	Succeeded by Brenda K. Sannes
