= David N. Hurd =

American judge (born 1937)

Senior Judge of the United States District Court for the Northern District of New York
- Incumbent
- Assumed office December 9, 2024

Judge of the United States District Court for the Northern District of New York
- In office September 22, 1999 – December 9, 2024
- Appointed by: Bill Clinton
- Preceded by: Constantine George Cholakis
- Succeeded by: Anthony Brindisi

Magistrate Judge of the United States District Court for the Northern District of New York
- In office 1991–1999

Personal details
- Born: May 9, 1937 (age 88) Hancock, New York, U.S.
- Education: Cornell University (BS); Syracuse University College of Law (JD)

David Norman Hurd (born May 9, 1937) is a senior United States district judge of the United States District Court for the Northern District of New York.

== Education and career ==
Hurd was born in Hancock, New York. He received a Bachelor of Science degree from Cornell University in 1959. He received a Juris Doctor from Syracuse University College of Law in 1963. He was in private practice of law in Utica, New York from 1963 to 1991. He was an assistant district attorney (part-time), Oneida County District Attorney's Office from 1966 to 1967.

== Federal judicial service ==
Hurd served as a United States magistrate judge of the United States District Court for the Northern District of New York from 1991 to 1999.

Hurd is a United States district judge of the United States District Court for the Northern District of New York. He was nominated by President Bill Clinton on February 12, 1999, to a seat vacated by Constantine George Cholakis. He was confirmed by the United States Senate on September 13, 1999, and received his commission on September 22, 1999.

On November 1, 2021, Hurd informed President Biden that he intended to take senior status effective upon the confirmation of his successor. On July 14, 2022, one day after Biden nominated Jorge Alberto Rodriguez of Clifton Park, an Albany-based assistant attorney general, Hurd wrote another letter to President Biden. In the letter, Hurd wrote “Please be advised that I immediately rescind my decision to take senior status as a United States District Judge for the Northern District of New York". “I will take senior status if a confirmed successor lives in this area and is permanently assigned to the United States Courthouse in Utica, New York. Otherwise, I shall remain on full-time active status until I retire or die.” On August 8, 2022, Kirsten Gillibrand's chief of staff Jess Fassler said “It has always been the expectation that Judge Hurd’s successor would sit in the Utica courthouse, and Jorge Rodriguez has committed to doing so”. On August 10, 2022, Hurd wrote a letter to Biden to officially rescind his senior status and remain in active service.

On March 27, 2024, Hurd wrote a new letter to Biden stating that he intended to take senior status upon confirmation of a successor. The news of his decision coincided with an announcement from the Administrative Office of the U.S. Courts that "there is no plan to close the courthouse" in Utica. On July 31, Biden nominated Anthony J. Brindisi to succeed Hurd. Brindisi's nomination was confirmed on December 4, 2024. Hurd assumed senior status on December 9, 2024.

== Notable cases ==
In August 2001, Hurd became the first judge to apply New York's abortion clinic access law, passed in 1999.

On February 20, 2003, Hurd ruled that New York authorities cannot punish a state trial judge for political activity. Albany judge Thomas J. Spargo had handed out doughnuts and gasoline coupons during his campaign, bought drinks for voters, spoke at political fundraising rallies, and loudly protested against the 2000 election recount process in Florida. However, Hurd said he had no opinion on whether Spargo's actions "would bring disrespect to the judiciary". Hurd cited Republican Party of Minnesota v. White in his ruling.

On March 22, 2019, Hurd ruled that New York's ban on stun guns is unconstitutional.

In August 2020, Hurd ruled that a mandatory 14-day quarantine for travelers entering New York from states that have high rates of COVID-19 is constitutional.

In May 2021, in a suit between the Cayuga Nation of New York and the village of Union Springs, New York, Hurd ruled that a local ordinance that banned gambling in a village was preempted by the federal Indian Gaming Regulatory Act. This ruling was affirmed by the United States Court of Appeals for the Second Circuit soon after.

In June 2021, Hurd was removed from a criminal case by a 3-judge panel in the Second Circuit, who ruled that he improperly forced prosecutors to move for a lighter sentence.

On September 14, 2021, Hurd blocked a state vaccination mandate for health care workers from being enforced against those workers claiming religious exemptions, under the First Amendment right to freedom of religion. He later invited the state to appeal his ruling due to the importance of the case. On appeal, the Second Circuit vacated his injunction, and the Supreme Court of the United States refused to hear appeals to the Second Circuit's ruling.

On February 27, 2024, the Second Circuit vacated an order that Hurd entered on February 9, 2024. In Hurd's February 9 order, he denied—without any explanation—a defendant's request to modify the special conditions of the defendant's release from prison. In vacating Hurd's order, the Second Circuit found that Hurd's order "gives us no indication that the statutory factors were considered, nor does it permit this Court to conduct a meaningful review of the district court's determination." The Second Circuit ordered Hurd to reconsider the defendant's motion and "provide an explanation for its rationale" by March 28, 2024. However, following the Second Circuit's February 27 order, Hurd failed to reconsider the defendant's motion or take any action by the March 28 deadline. Accordingly, on April 17, 2024, the Second Circuit reassigned the case to a different district court judge "to preserve the appearance of justice."

== See also ==
- COVID-19 pandemic in New York (state)
- New York state government response to the COVID-19 pandemic

Legal offices
Preceded by Constantine George Cholakis	Judge of the United States District Court for the Northern District of New York; 1999–2024	Succeeded by Anthony Brindisi
