= Stephen W. Brennan =

American judge (1893–1968)

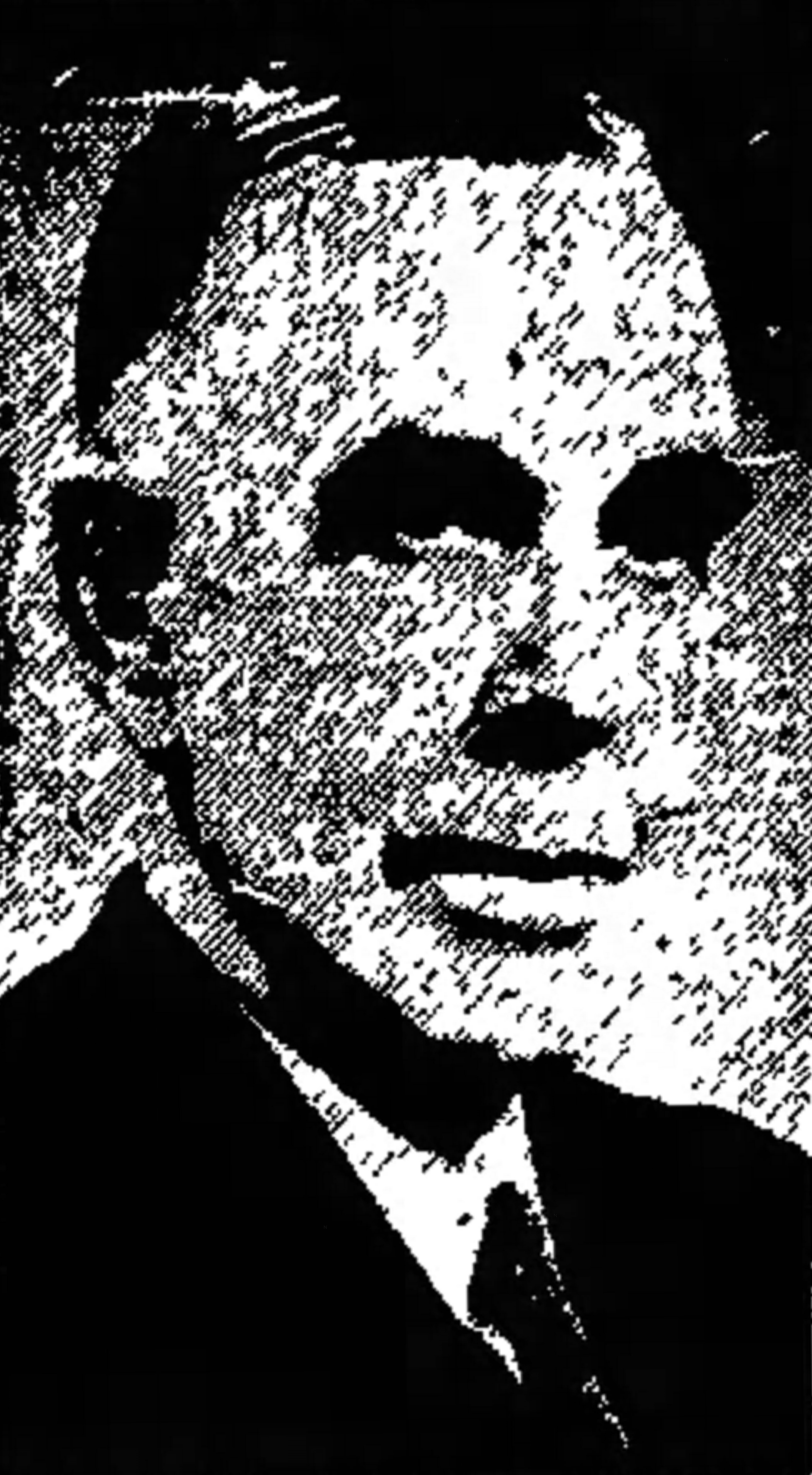

Senior Judge of the United States District Court for the Northern District of New York
- In office May 1, 1963 – April 9, 1968

Chief Judge of the United States District Court for the Northern District of New York
- In office 1948–1963
- Preceded by: Office established
- Succeeded by: James Thomas Foley

Judge of the United States District Court for the Northern District of New York
- In office May 6, 1942 – May 1, 1963
- Appointed by: Franklin D. Roosevelt
- Preceded by: Frank Cooper
- Succeeded by: Edmund Port

Personal details
- Born: Stephen William Brennan; March 20, 1893 Clinton, New York
- Died: April 9, 1968 (aged 75) Utica, New York
- Education: Albany Law School (LL.B.)

Stephen William Brennan (March 20, 1893 – April 9, 1968) was a United States district judge of the United States District Court for the Northern District of New York from 1942 to 1968 and Chief Judge from 1948 to 1963.

== Education and career ==
Born in Clinton, New York, Brennan received a Bachelor of Laws from Albany Law School in 1915. He was a Captain in the United States Army until 1916. He was a law clerk in private practice in New York from 1915 to 1916. He was in private practice in New York. He was an attorney for the New York State Tax Department.

== Federal judicial service ==
On March 31, 1942, President Franklin D. Roosevelt nominated Brennan to a seat on the United States District Court for the Northern District of New York vacated by Judge Frank Cooper. Brennan was confirmed by the United States Senate on April 28, 1942, and received his commission on May 6, 1942. He served as Chief Judge from 1948 to 1963. He assumed senior status on May 1, 1963, and continued serving in that capacity until his death on April 9, 1968, in Utica, New York.

== Sources ==
Legal offices
Preceded by Frank Cooper	Judge of the United States District Court for the Northern District of New York; 1942–1963	Succeeded by Edmund Port
Preceded by Office established	Chief Judge of the United States District Court for the Northern District of New York; 1948–1963	Succeeded by James Thomas Foley
