= Frank Cooper (judge) =

American judge (1869–1946)

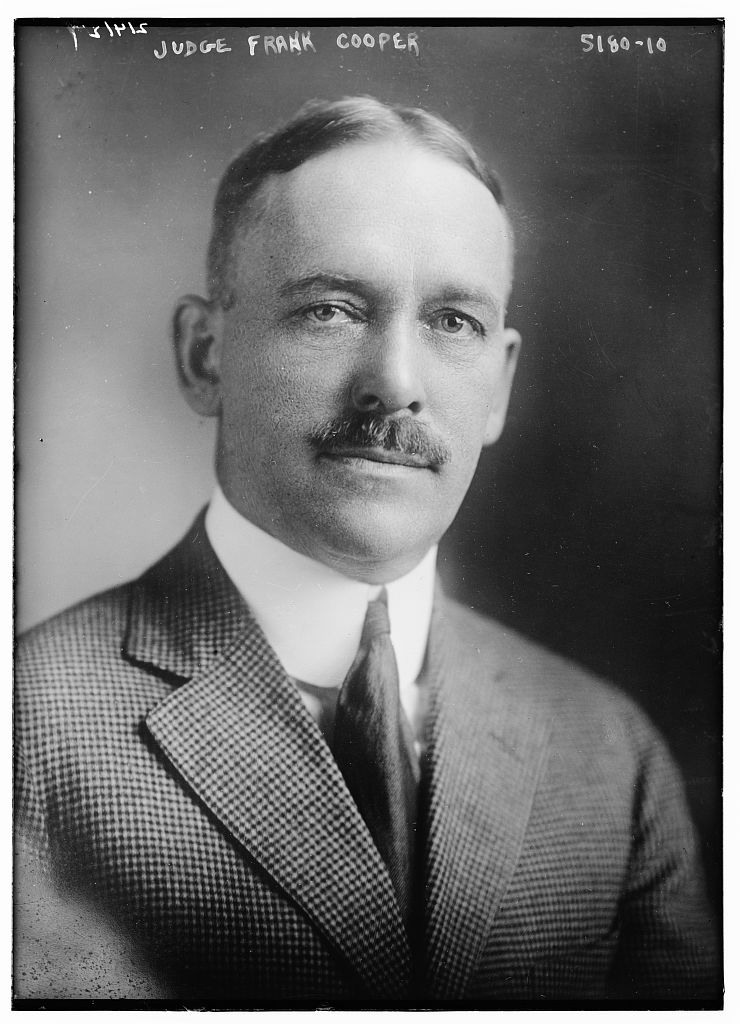
- Frank Cooper circa 1920

Senior Judge of the United States District Court for the Northern District of New York
- In office September 30, 1941 – July 16, 1946

Judge of the United States District Court for the Northern District of New York
- In office June 3, 1920 – September 30, 1941
- Appointed by: Woodrow Wilson
- Preceded by: Seat established by 40 Stat. 1156
- Succeeded by: Stephen W. Brennan

Personal details
- Born: Frank Cooper; October 1, 1869 Glenville, New York
- Died: July 16, 1946 (aged 76) Albany, New York
- Education: Union College (A.B., A.M.) read law

Frank Cooper (October 1, 1869 – July 16, 1946) was a United States district judge of the United States District Court for the Northern District of New York.

== Education and career ==
Born in Glenville, New York, Cooper received an Artium Baccalaureus degree from Union College in 1893, and read law in 1895. He received an Artium Magister degree from Union College in 1896, and was in private practice of law in Schenectady, New York from 1895 to 1920. He served as corporation counsel for Schenectady from 1910 to 1913, in 1916, in 1917, and in 1920.

== Federal judicial service ==
Cooper was nominated by President Woodrow Wilson on April 29, 1920, to the United States District Court for the Northern District of New York, to a new seat created by 40 Stat. 1156. He was confirmed by the United States Senate on June 3, 1920, and received his commission the same day. He assumed senior status on September 30, 1941. His service was terminated on July 16, 1946, due to his death in Albany, New York.

== Sources ==
Legal offices
Preceded by Seat established by 40 Stat. 1156	Judge of the United States District Court for the Northern District of New York; 1920–1941	Succeeded by Stephen W. Brennan
