= Howard G. Munson =

American judge (1924–2008)

Senior Judge of the United States District Court for the Northern District of New York
- In office November 5, 1990 – October 5, 2008

Chief Judge of the United States District Court for the Northern District of New York
- In office 1980–1988
- Preceded by: James Thomas Foley
- Succeeded by: Neal Peters McCurn

Judge of the United States District Court for the Northern District of New York
- In office October 4, 1976 – November 5, 1990
- Appointed by: Gerald Ford
- Preceded by: Edmund Port
- Succeeded by: Rosemary S. Pooler

Personal details
- Born: Howard G. Munson; July 26, 1924 Claremont, New Hampshire
- Died: October 5, 2008 (aged 84) Syracuse, New York
- Education: University of Pennsylvania (B.S.); Syracuse University College of Law (LL.B.)

Howard G. Munson (July 26, 1924 – October 5, 2008) was a United States district judge of the United States District Court for the Northern District of New York from 1976 to 2008 and chief judge from 1980 to 1988.

== Education and career ==
Born on July 26, 1924, in Claremont, New Hampshire, Munson received a Bachelor of Science degree from University of Pennsylvania in 1948. He received a Bachelor of Laws from Syracuse University College of Law in 1952. He was in the United States Army from 1943 to 1945. He was in private practice of law in Syracuse, New York, from 1952 to 1976. He was a member of the Syracuse Board of Education from 1965 to 1973 and President of the Board, from 1968 to 1970.

== Federal judicial service ==
Munson was nominated by President Gerald Ford on August 26, 1976, to a seat on the United States District Court for the Northern District of New York vacated by Judge Edmund Port. He was confirmed by the United States Senate on September 23, 1976, and received his commission on October 4, 1976. He served as Chief Judge, from 1980 to 1988. He assumed senior status on November 5, 1990 and took senior status but kept a full case load until May 2008, He retired and died on October 5, 2008.

== Sources ==
Legal offices
Preceded by Edmund Port	Judge of the United States District Court for the Northern District of New York; 1976–1990	Succeeded by Rosemary S. Pooler
Preceded by James Thomas Foley	Chief Judge of the United States District Court for the Northern District of New York; 1980–1988	Succeeded by Neal Peters McCurn
