= Mae D'Agostino =

American judge (born 1954)

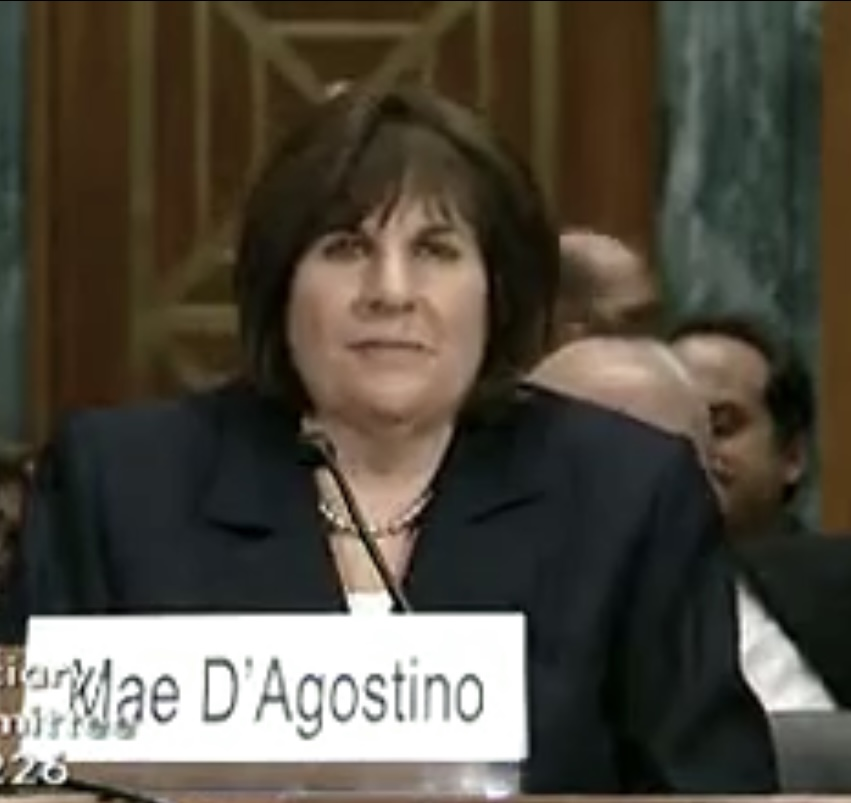

Judge of the United States District Court for the Northern District of New York
- Incumbent
- Assumed office March 30, 2011
- Appointed by: Barack Obama
- Preceded by: Frederick Scullin

Personal details
- Born: 1954 (age 71–72) Albany, New York
- Education: Siena College (BA); Syracuse University (JD)

Mae Avila D'Agostino (born in 1954) is a United States district judge of the United States District Court for the Northern District of New York. She was formerly an attorney in Albany County, New York.

== Early life, education and career ==
D'Agostino was born in 1954, in Albany, New York. D'Agostino received a Bachelor of Arts, magna cum laude, from Siena College in 1977 and a Juris Doctor from Syracuse University College of Law in 1980. D'Agostino practiced law in the Albany area, and was a partner in the firm of D'Agostino, Krackeler & Maguire, which focused on representing doctors, hospitals, and insurance companies in medical malpractice cases. From 1991 to 2011, she was an adjunct professor at Albany Law School.

== Federal judicial service ==
On June 23, 2010, Senator Chuck Schumer recommended D'Agostino to fill a vacancy on the United States District Court for the Northern District of New York. On September 29, 2010, President Barack Obama formally nominated her to the Northern District of New York. On March 28, 2011, the United States Senate confirmed her nomination by a 88–0 vote. She received her commission on March 30, 2011.

== Personal ==
D'Agostino is a single mother of an adopted boy.

Legal offices
Preceded by Frederick Scullin	Judge of the United States District Court for the Northern District of New York; 2011–present	Incumbent
