= James Thomas Foley =

American judge (1910–1990)

Senior Judge of the United States District Court for the Northern District of New York
- In office June 30, 1980 – August 17, 1990

Chief Judge of the United States District Court for the Northern District of New York
- In office 1963–1980
- Preceded by: Stephen W. Brennan
- Succeeded by: Howard G. Munson

Judge of the United States District Court for the Northern District of New York
- In office February 2, 1949 – June 30, 1980
- Appointed by: Harry S. Truman
- Preceded by: Edward S. Kampf
- Succeeded by: Roger Miner

Personal details
- Born: James Thomas Foley; July 9, 1910 Troy, New York
- Died: August 17, 1990 (aged 80) Albany, New York
- Education: Fordham University (A.B.); Albany Law School (LL.B.)

James Thomas Foley (July 9, 1910 – August 17, 1990) was a United States district judge of the United States District Court for the Northern District of New York from 1949 to 1990 and Chief Judge from 1963 to 1980.

== Education and career ==
Born on July 9, 1910, in Troy, New York, Foley received an Artium Baccalaureus degree in 1931 from Fordham University and a Bachelor of Laws in 1934 from Albany Law School. He entered private practice in Troy from 1935 to 1942. He was Secretary to Justice William H. Murray of the Supreme Court of the State of New York from 1939 to 1942 and from 1946 to 1949. He served in the United States Naval Reserve from 1942 to 1945.

== Federal judicial service ==
Foley was nominated by President Harry S. Truman on January 13, 1949, to a seat on the United States District Court for the Northern District of New York vacated by Judge Edward S. Kampf. He was confirmed by the United States Senate on January 31, 1949, and received his commission on February 2, 1949. He served as Chief Judge from 1963 to 1980. He assumed senior status on June 30, 1980. His service terminated on August 17, 1990, due to his death in Albany, New York.

== See also ==
- List of United States federal judges by longevity of service

== Sources ==
Legal offices
Preceded by Edward S. Kampf	Judge of the United States District Court for the Northern District of New York; 1949–1980	Succeeded by Roger Miner
Preceded by Stephen W. Brennan	Chief Judge of the United States District Court for the Northern District of New York; 1963–1980	Succeeded by Howard G. Munson
