= Norman A. Mordue =

American judge (1942–2022)

Senior Judge of the United States District Court for the Northern District of New York
- In office June 30, 2013 – December 29, 2022

Chief Judge of the United States District Court for the Northern District of New York
- In office 2006–2011
- Preceded by: Frederick Scullin
- Succeeded by: Gary L. Sharpe

Judge of the United States District Court for the Northern District of New York
- In office October 22, 1998 – June 30, 2013
- Appointed by: Bill Clinton
- Preceded by: Rosemary S. Pooler
- Succeeded by: Brenda K. Sannes

Personal details
- Born: June 26, 1942 Syracuse, New York, U.S.
- Died: December 29, 2022 (aged 80)
- Education: Syracuse University (BA, JD)

Norman Allen Mordue (June 26, 1942 – December 29, 2022) was an American jurist who was a United States district judge of the United States District Court for the Northern District of New York.

== Early life and education ==
Mordue grew up as one of five children in Elmira, New York and attended Manlius Military Academy. He graduated with a Bachelor of Arts degree in Economics from Syracuse University in 1966 and with a Juris Doctor from the Syracuse University College of Law in 1971.

Mordue played halfback for the Syracuse Orange football under coach Ben Schwartzwalder, playing alongside future NFL players Floyd Little and Jim Nance. He was a member of the 1965 Sugar Bowl team.

== Career ==
From 1972 to 1982, he worked for the district attorney in Onondaga County, New York, becoming a senior assistant distract attorney in 1974 and chief prosecutor in 1976.

He was a county court judge from 1982 to 1988, and a State Supreme Court Justice in Onondaga County from 1986 to 1998.

=== Military service ===
Mordue earned the Purple Heart, the Bronze Star, and the Distinguished Service Cross while serving as a captain in the U.S. Army in the Vietnam War from 1966 to 1968.

=== Federal judicial service ===
Upon the recommendation of Senator Alfonse D'Amato, President Bill Clinton nominated Mordue to replace Rosemary S. Pooler on the United States District Court for the Northern District of New York in July 1998. Mordue was confirmed unanimously by the Senate on October 21, 1998, received his commission on October 22, 1998, and took office on December 4, 1998. He took senior status on June 30, 2013. He was Chief Judge of the court from 2006 to 2011.

== Notable cases ==
As a prosecutor in the Onondaga County District Attorney's Office, Mordue successfully prosecuted Robert Garrow, a notorious serial killer convicted of murdering three campers in the Adirondacks and a teenage girl in Syracuse in 1973.

Mordue three times ruled in favor of the school district's censorship of religious content in an assignment in Peck v. Baldwinsville School District. He also ruled in favor of a school district censoring a student newspaper's cartoon of stick figures in sexual positions in R.O. v. Ithaca.

== Death ==
Mordue died on December 29, 2022, at the age of 80.

== Sources ==
Legal offices
Preceded by Rosemary S. Pooler	Judge of the United States District Court for the Northern District of New York; 1998–2013	Succeeded by Brenda K. Sannes
Preceded by Frederick Scullin	Chief Judge of the United States District Court for the Northern District of New York; 2006–2011	Succeeded by Gary L. Sharpe
