= United States District Court for the Northern District of New York =

United States federal district court in New York (U.S. state)

- (N.D.N.Y.)
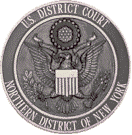

- Geographic boundaries of the district
- Location: James M. Hanley Federal Building & U.S. Courthouse (Syracuse) More locations: James T. Foley United States Courthouse (Albany); Binghamton; Plattsburgh; Alexander Pirnie Federal Building (Utica); Auburn; Malone; Watertown
- Appeals to: Second Circuit
- Established: April 9, 1814
- Judges: 5
- Chief Judge: Brenda K. Sannes

Officers of the court
- U.S. Attorney: Vacant
- U.S. Marshal: David McNulty
- www.nynd.uscourts.gov

The United States District Court for the Northern District of New York (in case citations, N.D.N.Y.) serves one of the 94 judicial districts in the United States and one of four in the state of New York. Appeals from the Northern District of New York are taken to the United States Court of Appeals for the Second Circuit, which has jurisdiction over the four districts of New York, the District of Connecticut and the District of Vermont (except for patent claims and claims against the U.S. government under the Tucker Act, which are appealed to the Federal Circuit). The U.S. attorney for the district is vacant since February 11, 2026.

Its jurisdiction comprises the counties of Albany, Broome, Cayuga, Chenango, Clinton, Columbia, Cortland, Delaware, Essex, Franklin, Fulton, Greene, Hamilton, Herkimer, Jefferson, Lewis, Madison, Montgomery, Oneida, Onondaga, Oswego, Otsego, Rensselaer, Saratoga, Schenectady, Schoharie, St. Lawrence, Tioga, Tompkins, Ulster, Warren, and Washington.

The court's main offices are in Syracuse, however, the court has additional offices in Albany, Binghamton, Plattsburgh, and Utica. The court also maintains facilities in Watertown. The court accepts filings from members of the bar through an automated case management system CM/ECF over the Internet.

== History ==
The first federal court district formed under the sovereignty of the United States was the District of New York. The District Court for the District of New York convened on November 3, 1789, with Judge James Duane presiding. On April 9, 1814, that original district split into the Northern and Southern Districts of New York; the first federal judge of the District Court for the Northern District of New York was Matthias Burnett Tallmadge. The Northern District's western area split off in 1900 and became the Western District of New York. The Northern District now covers thirty-two counties in upstate New York, and it shares its long northern border with Canada.

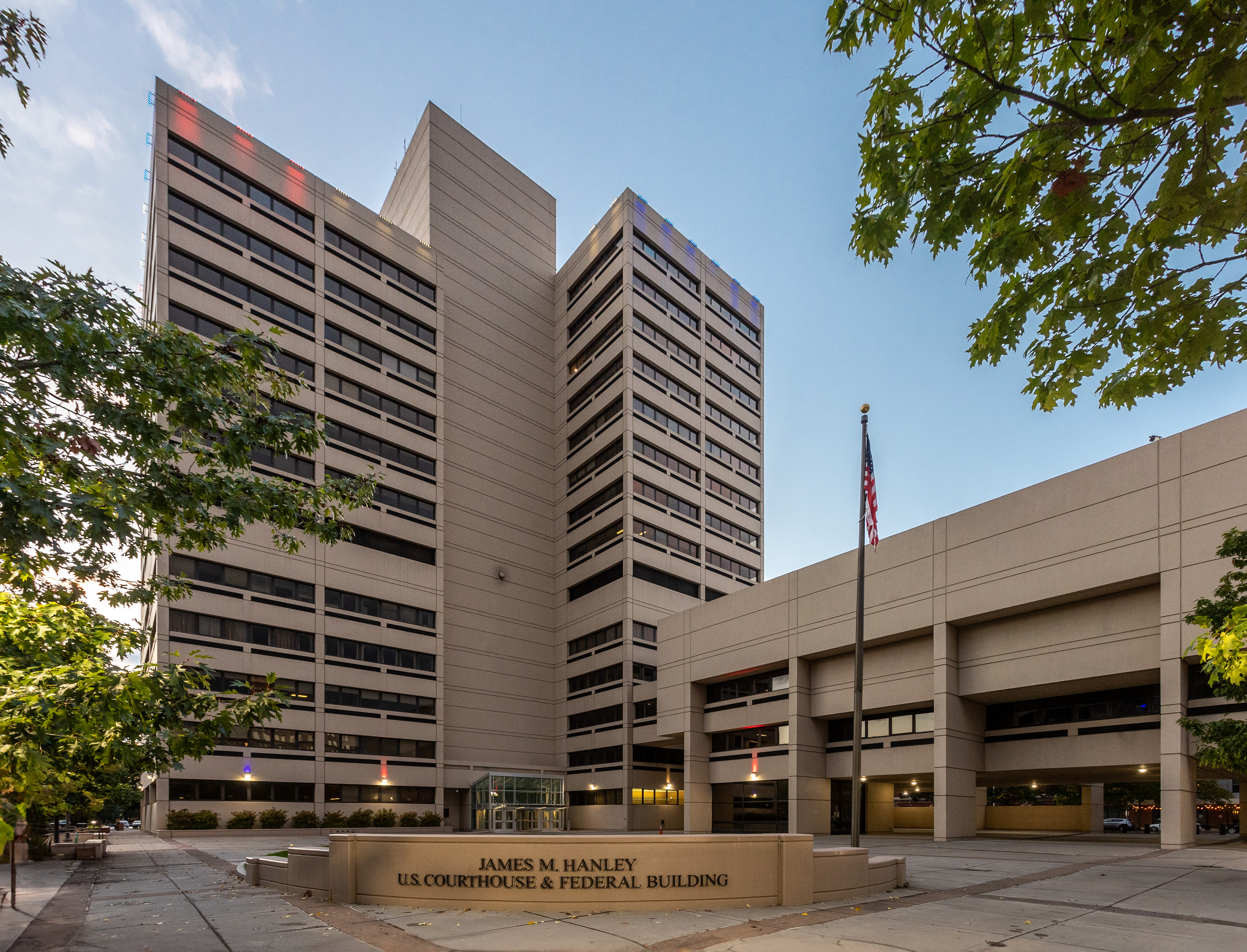
The court's main offices in Syracuse

== Current judges ==
As of December 9, 2024:

#	Title	Judge	Duty station	Born	Term of service			Appointed by
#	Title	Judge	Duty station	Born	Active	Chief	Senior	Appointed by
27	Chief Judge	Brenda K. Sannes	Syracuse	1958	2014–present	2022–present	—	Obama
26	District Judge	Mae D'Agostino	Albany	1954	2011–present	—	—	Obama
28	District Judge	Anne M. Nardacci	Albany	1977	2022–present	—	—	Biden
29	District Judge	Elizabeth C. Coombe	Syracuse	1967	2024–present	—	—	Biden
30	District Judge	Anthony Brindisi	Utica	1978	2024–present	—	—	Biden
17	Senior Judge	Thomas James McAvoy	inactive	1938	1986–2003	1993–2000	2003–present	Reagan
19	Senior Judge	Frederick Scullin	Syracuse	1939	1992–2006	2000–2006	2006–present	G.H.W. Bush
21	Senior Judge	Lawrence E. Kahn	Albany	1937	1996–2007	—	2007–present	Clinton
23	Senior Judge	David N. Hurd	Utica	1937	1999–2024	—	2024–present	Clinton
25	Senior Judge	Glenn T. Suddaby	Syracuse	1956	2008–2024	2015–2022	2024–present	G.W. Bush

== Former judges ==
#	Judge	Born–died	Active service	Chief Judge	Senior status	Appointed by	Reason for termination
1	Matthias B. Tallmadge	1774–1819	1814–1819 (Note: Recess appointment; formally nominated on December 20, 1805, confirmed by the United States Senate on December 23, 1805, and received commission on January 17, 1806. Reassigned from the District of New York.)	—	—	Jefferson/Operation of law	resignation
2	Roger Skinner	1773–1825	1819–1825 (Note: Recess appointment; formally nominated on January 3, 1820, confirmed by the Senate on January 5, 1820, and received commission the same day.)	—	—	Monroe	death
3	Alfred Conkling	1789–1874	1825–1852 (Note: Recess appointment; formally nominated on December 13, 1825, confirmed by the Senate on December 14, 1825, and received commission the same day.)	—	—	J.Q. Adams	resignation
4	Nathan K. Hall	1810–1874	1852–1874	—	—	Fillmore	death
5	William James Wallace	1837–1917	1874–1882	—	—	Grant	elevation
6	Alfred Conkling Coxe Sr.	1847–1923	1882–1902	—	—	Arthur	elevation
7	George W. Ray	1844–1925	1902–1925 (Note: Recess appointment; formally nominated on December 2, 1902, confirmed by the Senate on December 8, 1902, and received commission the same day.)	—	—	T. Roosevelt	death
8	Frank Cooper	1869–1946	1920–1941	—	1941–1946	Wilson	death
9	Frederick Howard Bryant	1877–1945	1927–1945 (Note: Recess appointment; formally nominated on December 6, 1927, confirmed by the Senate on December 19, 1927, and received commission the same day.)	—	—	Coolidge	death
10	Stephen W. Brennan	1893–1968	1942–1963	1948–1963	1963–1968	F. Roosevelt	death
11	Edward S. Kampf	1900–1971	1946–1948	—	—	Truman	resignation
12	James Thomas Foley	1910–1990	1949–1980	1963–1980	1980–1990	Truman	death
13	Edmund Port	1906–1986	1964–1976	—	1976–1986	L. Johnson	death
14	Howard G. Munson	1924–2008	1976–1990	1980–1988	1990–2008	Ford	death
15	Neal Peters McCurn	1926–2014	1979–1993	1988–1993	1993–2014	Carter	death
16	Roger Miner	1934–2012	1981–1985	—	—	Reagan	elevation
18	Constantine Cholakis	1930–1996	1986–1996	—	1996	Reagan	death
20	Rosemary S. Pooler	1938–2023	1994–1998	—	—	Clinton	elevation
22	Norman A. Mordue	1942–2022	1998–2013	2006–2011	2013–2022	Clinton	death
24	Gary L. Sharpe	1947–2024	2004–2016	2011–2015	2016–2024	G.W. Bush	death

== Chief judges ==
Chief Judge
Brennan	1948–1963
Foley	1963–1980
Munson	1980–1988
McCurn	1988–1993
McAvoy	1993–2000
Scullin	2000–2006
Mordue	2006–2011
Sharpe	2011–2015
Suddaby	2015–2022
Sannes	2022–present

Chief judges have administrative responsibilities with respect to their district court. Unlike the Supreme Court, where one justice is specifically nominated to be chief, the office of chief judge rotates among the district court judges. To be chief, a judge must have been in active service on the court for at least one year, be under the age of 65, and have not previously served as chief judge.

A vacancy is filled by the judge highest in seniority among the group of qualified judges. The chief judge serves for a term of seven years, or until age 70, whichever occurs first. The age restrictions are waived if no members of the court would otherwise be qualified for the position.

When the office was created in 1948, the chief judge was the longest-serving judge who had not elected to retire, on what has since 1958 been known as senior status, or declined to serve as chief judge. After August 6, 1959, judges could not become or remain chief after turning 70 years old. The current rules have been in operation since October 1, 1982.

== Succession of seats ==
Seat 1
Seat reassigned from the District of New York on April 9, 1814
Tallmadge	1814–1819
Skinner	1819–1825
Conkling	1825–1852
Hall	1852–1874
Wallace	1874–1882
Coxe, Sr.	1882–1902
Ray	1902–1925
Seat abolished on January 10, 1925 pursuant to the provisions of 40 Stat. 1156

Seat 2
Seat established on June 3, 1920 pursuant to the provisions 40 Stat. 1156 (temporary)
Seat became permanent upon the abolition of Seat 1 on January 10, 1925
Cooper	1920–1941
Brennan	1942–1963
Port	1964–1976
Munson	1976–1990
Pooler	1994–1998
Mordue	1998–2013
Sannes	2014–present

Seat 3
Seat established on March 3, 1927 by 44 Stat. 1374
Bryant	1927–1945
Kampf	1946–1948
Foley	1949–1980
Miner	1981–1985
Cholakis	1986–1996
Hurd	1999–2024
Brindisi	2024–present

Seat 4
Seat established on October 20, 1978 by 92 Stat. 1629
McCurn	1979–1993
Kahn	1996–2007
Suddaby	2008–2024
Coombe	2024–present

Seat 5
Seat established on July 10, 1984 by 98 Stat. 333
McAvoy	1986–2003
Sharpe	2004–2016
Nardacci	2022–present

Seat 6
Seat established on December 1, 1990 by 104 Stat. 5089 (temporary)
Seat made permanent on November 2, 2002 by 116 Stat. 1758
Scullin, Jr.	1992–2006
D'Agostino	2011–present

== See also ==
- Courts of New York
- List of current United States district judges
- List of United States federal courthouses in New York
- United States Attorney for the Northern District of New York
