= Howard Conkling =

American politician

Howard Conkling (December 7, 1855 – September 5, 1938) was an American lawyer and politician from New York.

== Life ==
Conkling was born on December 7, 1855, at the family's Manhattan home, 27 E. 10th St. He came from a distinguished political family, the Seymour-Conkling family, which included his father, Representative Frederick A. Conkling, his uncle, Senator Roscoe Conkling, and his brother, New York Assemblyman Alfred R. Conkling.

Conkling attended Mount Washington Collegiate Institute in Washington Square. From 1879 to 1881, Howard Conkling served as a clerk for New York City Fire Department Chief Eli Bates and also worked as a clerk in an importing house. After several years of traveling, he relocated to Luzerne, New York, where he became involved in the lumbering business. In Luzerne, he founded the Luzerne Driving Park Association and held leadership roles in various organizations, including vice-president of the Warren County Agricultural Society and secretary of the Society for Instruction in First Aid to the Injured. Additionally, he curated a picture gallery featuring a collection of prints and engravings on the history of the United States.

In 1891, Conkling was first elected to the New York State Assembly as a Republican, representing Warren County. He served in the Assembly in 1892 and 1893. He then attended New York University School of Law, graduating in 1896 and later passing the bar. He was a member of the Delta Chi fraternity. At one point, he moved to Indiana and was admitted to the bar in Indianapolis, but later returned to New York City and practiced law there. He also worked in real estate.

In the 1898 United States House of Representatives election, Conkling ran for the House of Representatives in New York's 12th congressional district. He lost the election to George B. McClellan Jr. He then returned to the New York State Assembly in 1903, 1914, and 1915.

Conkling wrote several books, including one on his travels to Mexico called "Mexico and the Mexicans" and a biography on Le Chevalier de la Luzerne. He was interested in the French language and was an officer of Alliance française. He was a member of the Union Club, the Metropolitan Club, the New York Athletic Club, and the Saint Nicholas Society of the City of New York. He was a pewholder of the Church of the Transfiguration, Episcopal.

When Conkling retired from law in around 1918, he moved to Providence, Rhode Island. He died on September 5, 1938, in Butler Hospital. He was buried in Green-Wood Cemetery.

New York State Assembly
| Preceded by William M. Cameron | New York State Assembly; Warren County; 1892-1893 | Succeeded by Taylor J. Eldridge |
| Preceded by John A. Weekes, Jr. | New York State Assembly; New York County, 25th District; 1903 | Succeeded by Ezra P. Prentice |
| Preceded by Charles J. Carroll | New York State Assembly; New York County, 29th District; 1914-1915 | Succeeded by Alfred D. Bell |
