= Margaret Cockburn Conkling =

American writer (1814–1890)

- Born: October 29, 1814; Albany County
- Died: July 28, 1890; Jersey City
- Occupation: Writer
- Father: Alfred Conkling
- Relatives: Roscoe Conkling, Frederick A. Conkling

Margaret Cockburn Conkling Steele (October 29, 1814 – July 28, 1890) was an American writer.

Margaret Cockburn Conkling was born on October 29, 1814 in Albany County, New York, the daughter of Judge Alfred Conkling and Elizabeth Cockburn Conkling. Her siblings included politicians Roscoe Conkling and Frederick A. Conkling. She married Albert Steele.

Conkling's most famous work was Memoirs of the Mother and Wife of Washington (1850), a romantic and embellished account of the lives of Mary Ball Washington and Martha Washington.

She wrote The American Gentleman’s Guide to Politeness and Fashion (1857) under the name Henry Lunettes. A rare 19th century etiquette guide written by a woman under a man's name, it was republished a half dozen times in the 19th century. Conkling also published a novel, Isabel; or, Trials of the Heart (1845), a play, The widower's stratagem (1860), and a translation of Florian's History of the Moors of Spain that was included in Harper & Brothers's "School District Library Series".

Margaret Cockburn Conkling died on 28 July 1890 in Jersey City, New Jersey.

== Bibliography ==
- Isabel; or, Trials of the Heart. New York: Harper and Bros., 1845
- Memoirs of the mother and wife of Washington. Life story of Mary Washington, and Martha Washington. Auburn, NY: Derby, Miller, & Co., 1850.
- The American Gentleman’s Guide to Politeness and Fashion; or, Familiar Letters to His Nephews, Containing Rules of Etiquette, Directions for the Formation of Character, etc., etc., illustrated by Sketches Drawn from Life, of the Men and Manners of Our Times. By Henry Lunettes. New York: Derby & Jackson and Cincinnati: H. W. Derby & Co., 1857.
- The widower's stratagem; or, a circle within a circle. A drama in 5 acts. Racine, WI : Sanford & Tapley, 1860.
