= William James Wallace =

American judge (1837–1917)

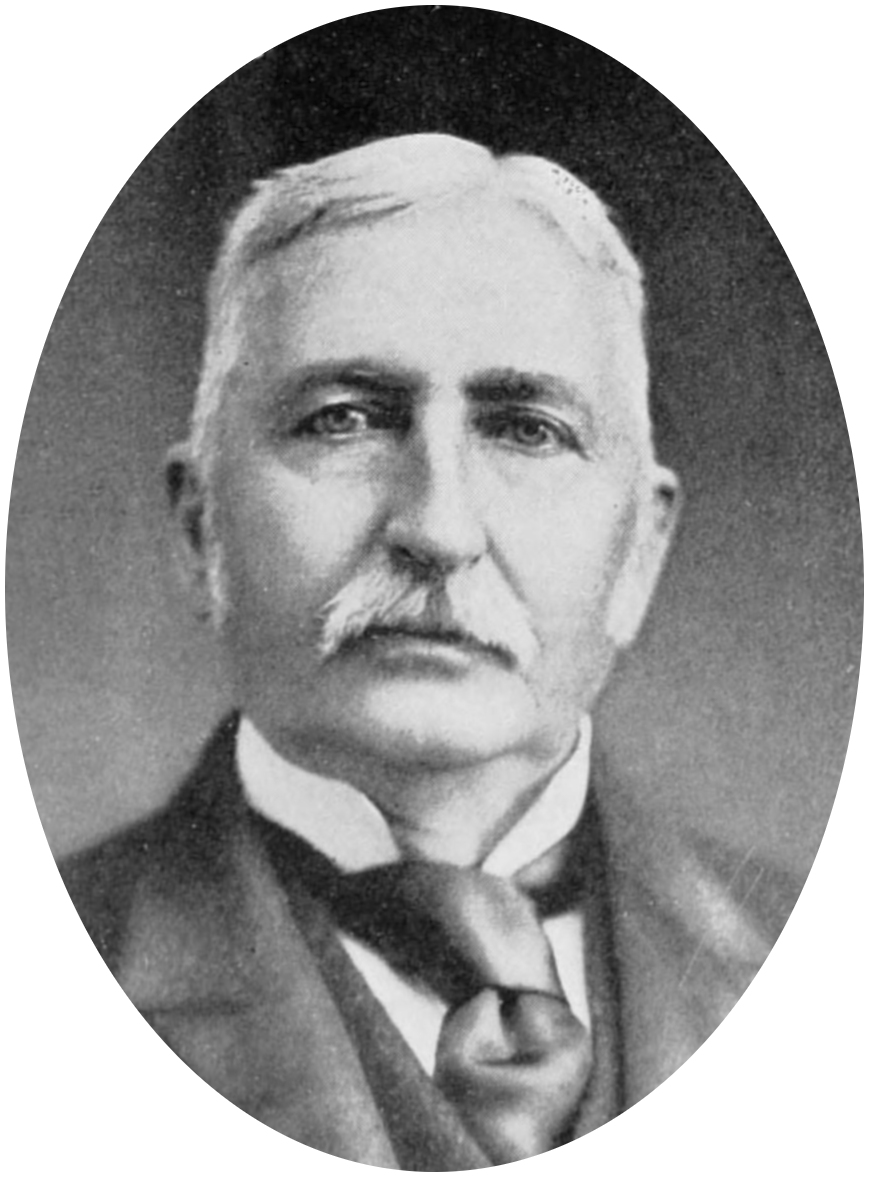

Judge of the United States Court of Appeals for the Second Circuit
- In office June 16, 1891 – May 8, 1907
- Appointed by: operation of law
- Preceded by: Seat established by 26 Stat. 826
- Succeeded by: Henry Galbraith Ward

Judge of the United States Circuit Courts for the Second Circuit
- In office April 6, 1882 – May 8, 1907
- Appointed by: Chester A. Arthur
- Preceded by: Samuel Blatchford
- Succeeded by: Henry Galbraith Ward

Judge of the United States District Court for the Northern District of New York
- In office April 7, 1874 – April 25, 1882
- Appointed by: Ulysses S. Grant
- Preceded by: Nathan K. Hall
- Succeeded by: Alfred Conkling Coxe Sr.

Personal details
- Born: William James Wallace; April 14, 1837 Syracuse, New York, US
- Died: March 11, 1917 (aged 79) Jacksonville, Florida, US
- Education: Syracuse University; Hamilton College (LLB)

William James Wallace (April 14, 1837 – March 11, 1917) was a United States circuit judge of the United States Court of Appeals for the Second Circuit and of the United States Circuit Courts for the Second Circuit and previously was a United States district judge of the United States District Court for the Northern District of New York.

== Education and career ==
Born on April 14, 1837, in Syracuse, New York, Wallace attended Syracuse University and received a Bachelor of Laws in 1857 from the law department of Hamilton College, then read law in 1858. He entered private practice in Syracuse from 1859 to 1874. He was the Mayor of Syracuse from 1873 to 1874.

== Federal judicial service ==
Wallace was nominated by President Ulysses S. Grant on April 2, 1874, to a seat on the United States District Court for the Northern District of New York vacated by Judge Nathan K. Hall. He was confirmed by the United States Senate on April 7, 1874, and received his commission the same day. His service terminated on April 25, 1882, due to his elevation to the Second Circuit.

Wallace was nominated by President Chester A. Arthur on March 28, 1882, to a seat on the United States Circuit Court for the Second Circuit vacated by Judge Samuel Blatchford. He was confirmed by the United States Senate on April 6, 1882, and received his commission the same day. Wallace was assigned by operation of law to additional and concurrent service on the United States Court of Appeals for the Second Circuit on June 16, 1891, to a new seat authorized by 26 Stat. 826 (Evarts Act). His service terminated on May 8, 1907, due to his retirement.

== Later career and death ==
Following his retirement from the federal bench, Wallace resumed private practice in Syracuse from 1907 to 1917. He died on March 11, 1917, in Jacksonville, Florida.

== Sources ==
Legal offices
Preceded by Nathan K. Hall	Judge of the United States District Court for the Northern District of New York; 1874–1882	Succeeded by Alfred Conkling Coxe Sr.
Preceded by Samuel Blatchford	Judge of the United States Circuit Courts for the Second Circuit; 1882–1907	Succeeded by Henry Galbraith Ward
Preceded by Seat established by 26 Stat. 826	Judge of the United States Court of Appeals for the Second Circuit; 1891–1907	Succeeded by Henry Galbraith Ward
