= Alfred Conkling =

American judge (1789–1874)

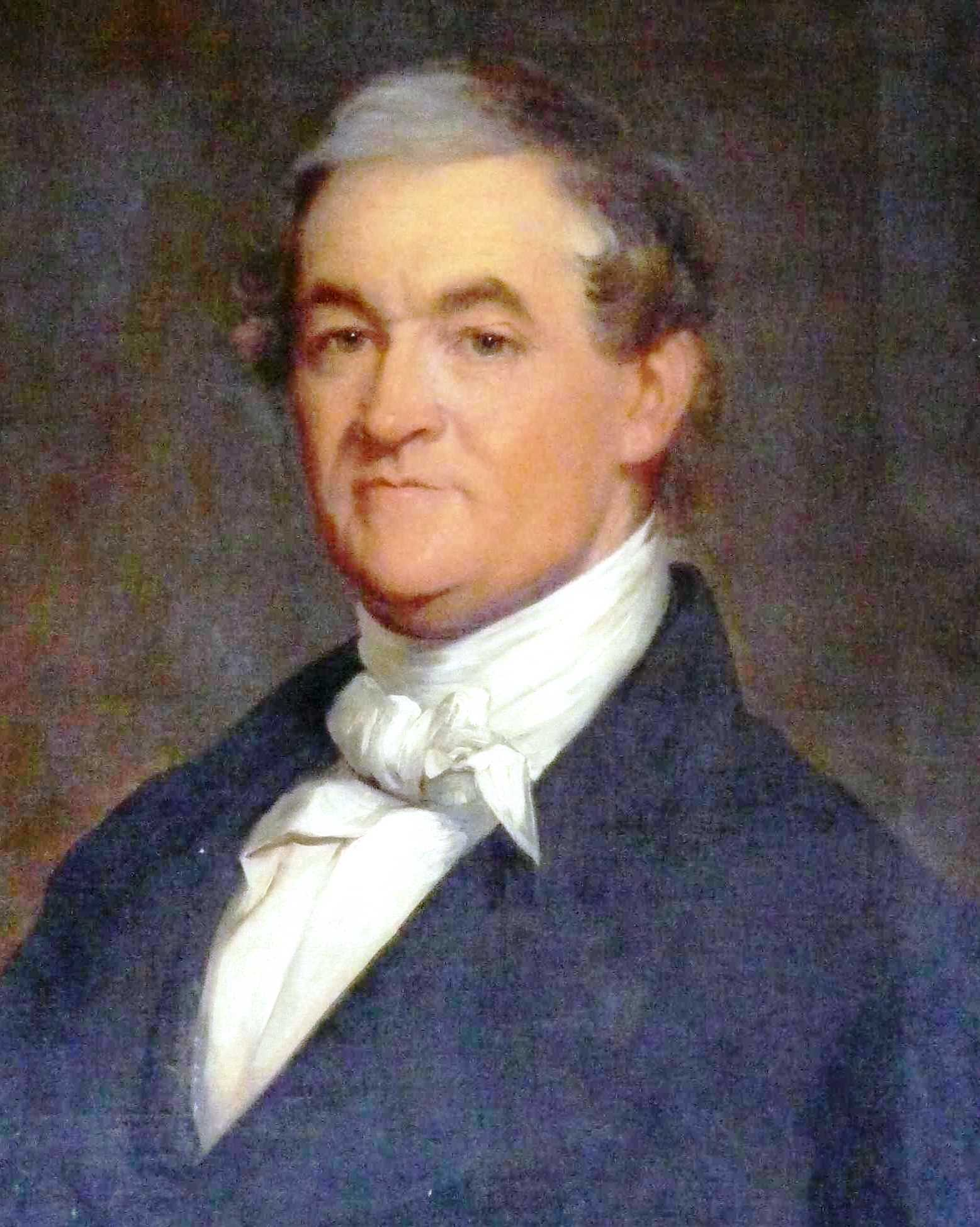

United States Minister to Mexico
- In office August 6, 1852 – August 17, 1853
- Appointed by: Millard Fillmore
- Preceded by: Robert P. Letcher
- Succeeded by: James Gadsden

Judge of the United States District Court for the Northern District of New York
- In office December 14, 1825 – August 25, 1852
- Appointed by: John Quincy Adams
- Preceded by: Roger Skinner
- Succeeded by: Nathan K. Hall

Member of the U.S. House of Representatives from New York's 14th district
- In office March 4, 1821 – March 3, 1823
- Preceded by: John Fay
- Succeeded by: Henry R. Storrs

Personal details
- Born: Alfred Conkling; October 12, 1789 Amagansett, New York, U.S.
- Died: February 5, 1874 (aged 84) Utica, New York, U.S.
- Resting place: Forest Hill Cemetery; Utica, New York, U.S.
- Party: Democratic-Republican; Whig
- Spouse: Eliza Cockburn (after 1812)
- Children: 5, including Frederick, Roscoe
- Relatives: Alfred Conkling Coxe Sr. (grandson)
- Education: Union College
- Profession: Attorney

Alfred Conkling (October 12, 1789 – February 5, 1874) was a United States representative from New York, a United States district judge of the United States District Court for the Northern District of New York and United States Minister to Mexico.

== Early life ==
Conkling was born on October 12, 1789, in Amagansett, New York. He was the son of Benjamin Conkling and Esther Hand.

He graduated from Union College in 1810 and read law in 1812.

== Career ==
He was admitted to the bar and entered private practice in Johnstown, New York, from 1812 to 1813. He continued private practice in Canajoharie, New York, from 1813 to 1819. He was district attorney for Montgomery County, New York, from 1819 to 1821.

=== Congressional service ===
Conkling was elected as a Democratic-Republican from New York's 14th congressional district to the United States House of Representatives of the 17th United States Congress, serving from March 4, 1821, to March 3, 1823. Following his departure from Congress, he resumed private practice in Albany, New York, from 1823 to 1825.

=== Federal judicial service ===
Conkling received a recess appointment from President John Quincy Adams on August 27, 1825, to a seat on the United States District Court for the Northern District of New York vacated by Judge Roger Skinner. He was nominated to the same position by President Adams on December 13, 1825. He was confirmed by the United States Senate on December 14, 1825, and received his commission the same day. While on the bench, he moved from Albany to Auburn, New York, in 1839. There were several attempts to impeach him, but they failed. His service terminated on August 25, 1852, due to his resignation.

=== Later career ===
Conkling was United States Envoy Extraordinary and Minister Plenipotentiary to Mexico for the United States Department of State from August 6, 1852, to August 17, 1853. He resumed private practice in Omaha, Nebraska, from 1853 to 1861. He was a writer in Rochester and Geneseo, New York, from 1861 to 1872. He was a writer in Utica, New York, from 1872 to 1874.

== Personal life ==
On May 5, 1812, Conkling was married to Elizabeth "Eliza" Cockburn (1791–1851). Together, they were the parents of five children, including:

- Margaret Cockburn Conkling (1814–1890), who became an accomplished author, with works such as The American Gentleman's Guide To Politeness and Fashion, Memoirs of the Mother and Wife of Washington, Isabel; or, Trials of the Heart and a translation of Florian's History of the Moors of Spain.
- Frederick Augustus Conkling (1816–1891), a United States representative from New York.
- Aurelian Conkling (1819–1861), who studied law and served as the Clerk of Court for the Northern District of New York in Buffalo until his death in May 1860. He married Harriet Adriana Schermerhorn (1815–1886), a daughter of Commissioner John F. Schermerhorn.
- Eliza Conkling (1820–1868), who married Reverend Samuel Hanson Coxe, the son of abolitionist minister, author, and educator Samuel Hanson Cox.
- Roscoe Conkling (1829–1888), a United States Representative and United States Senator from New York.

Conkling died on February 5, 1874, in Utica. He was interred in Forest Hill Cemetery in Utica.

=== Descendants and legacy ===
Conkling's grandson Alfred Conkling Coxe Sr. also served as United States District Judge in the Northern District of New York, and later a judge on the United States Court of Appeals for the Second Circuit; Coxe's own son (Conkling's great-grandson) Alfred Conkling Coxe Jr. was a Judge of the United States District Court for the Southern District of New York.

A photograph of Judge Conkling hangs in the courtroom at the United States District Court in Utica, New York.

== See also ==
- Seymour-Conkling family

== Sources ==
- United States Congress. "Alfred Conkling (id: C000679)". Biographical Directory of the United States Congress.
- Alfred Conkling at the Biographical Directory of Federal Judges, a publication of the Federal Judicial Center.
- Wilson, J. G.; Fiske, J., eds. (1900). "Conkling, Alfred" . Appletons' Cyclopædia of American Biography. New York: D. Appleton.

U.S. House of Representatives
Preceded by John Fay	Member of the U.S. House of Representatives from New York's 14th congressional district 1821–1823	Succeeded by Henry R. Storrs
Legal offices
Preceded by Roger Skinner	Judge of the United States District Court for the Northern District of New York; 1825–1852	Succeeded by Nathan K. Hall
