= Henry Galbraith Ward =

American judge (1851–1933)

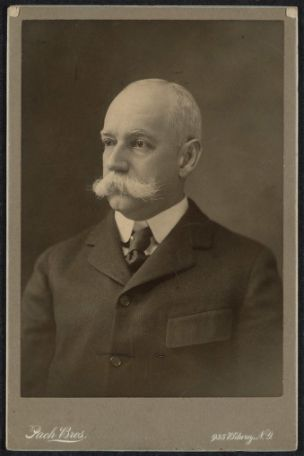

Senior Judge of the United States Court of Appeals for the Second Circuit
- In office June 30, 1921 – October 31, 1924

Judge of the United States Court of Appeals for the Second Circuit
- In office May 18, 1907 – June 30, 1921
- Appointed by: Theodore Roosevelt
- Preceded by: William James Wallace
- Succeeded by: Julius Marshuetz Mayer

Judge of the United States Circuit Courts for the Second Circuit
- In office May 18, 1907 – December 31, 1911
- Appointed by: Theodore Roosevelt
- Preceded by: William James Wallace
- Succeeded by: Seat abolished

Personal details
- Born: Henry Galbraith Ward; April 19, 1851 New York City, US
- Died: August 24, 1933 (aged 82) Shelter Island, New York, US
- Spouse: Mabel Marquand Ward
- Education: University of Pennsylvania (BA, MA)

Henry Galbraith Ward (April 19, 1851 – August 24, 1933) was a United States circuit judge of the United States Court of Appeals for the Second Circuit and of the United States Circuit Courts for the Second Circuit.

== Education and career ==
Born on April 19, 1851, in New York City, New York, Ward received a Bachelor of Arts degree and a Master of Arts degree in 1870 from the University of Pennsylvania and read law in 1873. He entered private practice in Philadelphia, Pennsylvania from 1882 to 1884. He continued private practice in New York City starting in 1884.

== Federal judicial service ==
Ward received a recess appointment from President Theodore Roosevelt on May 18, 1907, to a joint seat on the United States Court of Appeals for the Second Circuit and the United States Circuit Courts for the Second Circuit vacated by Judge William James Wallace. He was nominated to the same position by President Roosevelt on December 3, 1907. He was confirmed by the United States Senate on December 17, 1907, and received his commission the same day. On December 31, 1911, the Circuit Courts were abolished and he thereafter served only on the Court of Appeals. He assumed senior status on June 30, 1921. His service terminated on October 31, 1924, due to his retirement.

== Death ==
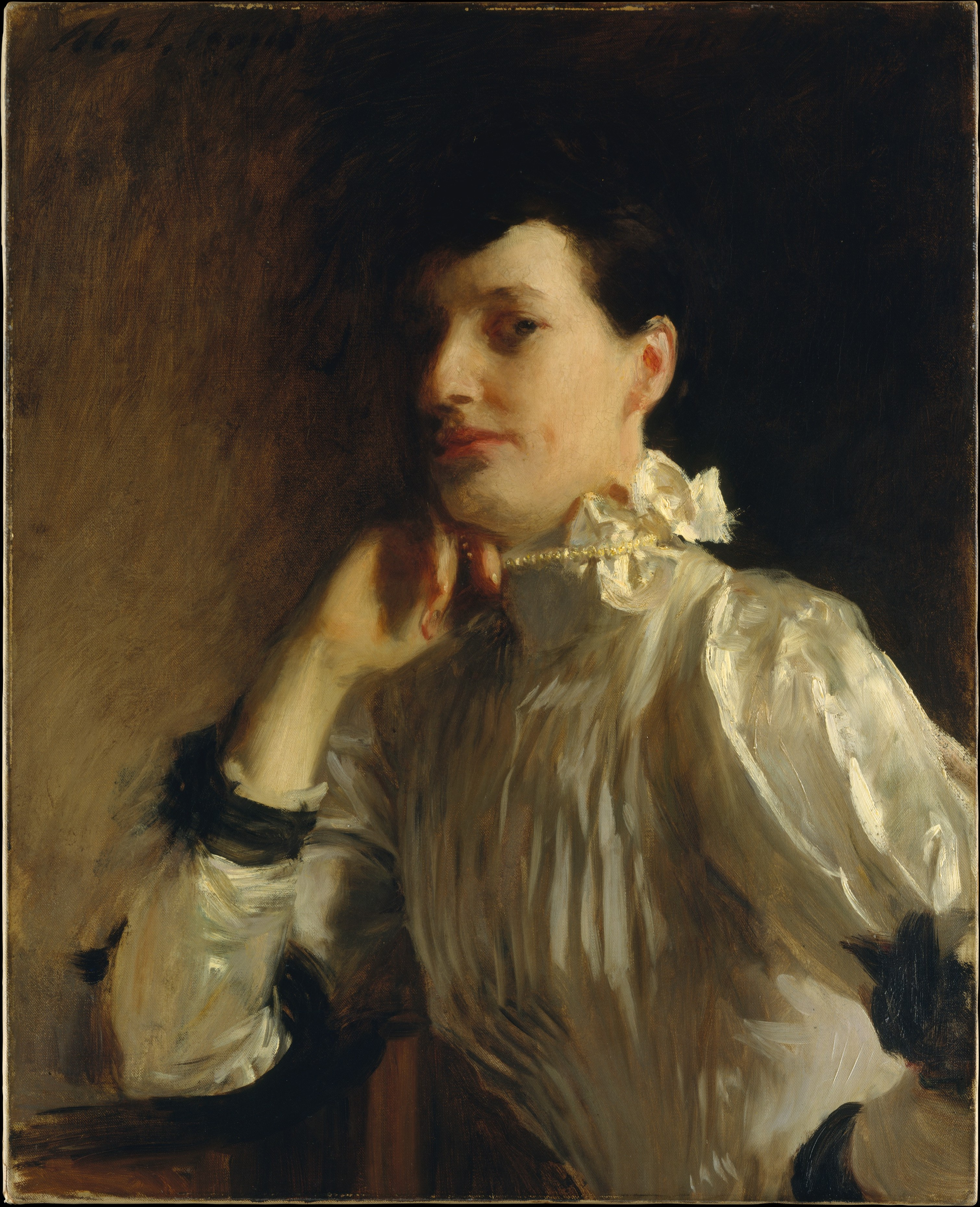
Ward's wife, Mabel Marquand Ward, painted by John Singer Sargent

Ward died on August 24, 1933, in Shelter Island, New York, New York.

== Sources ==
Legal offices
| Preceded by William James Wallace | Judge of the United States Circuit Courts for the Second Circuit; 1907–1911 | Succeeded by Seat abolished |
| Preceded by William James Wallace | Judge of the United States Court of Appeals for the Second Circuit; 1907–1921 | Succeeded by Julius Marshuetz Mayer |
