= Charles J. Carroll =

American lawyer and politician (1882–1942)

- Preceded by: Thomas S. Coleman
- Succeeded by: Howard Conkling

Senior attorney of the United States Maritime Commission's Legal Division
- In office ?–1942

Lawyer for the United States Department of Commerce
- In office 1913–?

New York State Assembly
- In office 1913–1913

Personal details
- Born: September 1, 1882 New York City, New York
- Died: August 15, 1942 (aged 59) New York City, New York
- Party: Democratic Party
- Spouse: May
- Children: 3
- Education: College of St. Francis Xavier; New York Law School

Charles Joseph Carroll (September 1, 1882 – August 15, 1942) was an American lawyer and politician from New York City.

== Early life and education ==
Carroll was born on September 1, 1882, in New York City, New York, the son of Patrick Carroll and Mary Kelly. His family was among the oldest and best known in Yorkville. Carroll attended P.S. No. 6 and graduated from College of St. Francis Xavier with a B.A. in 1905. He then studied law at New York Law School while teaching in public evening schools. He was involved in athletics in college, especially baseball and football. He graduated from New York Law School and was admitted to the bar that year.

== Career ==
By 1913, he was a member of the law firm Carroll & McCormack, with offices at 256 Broadway. He vacationed on the shores of Lake Champlain, where he assisted in managing the College Camp at Cliff Haven. He was interested in politics since boyhood and gave a number of public speeches. In 1912, he was elected to the New York State Assembly as a Democrat, representing the New York County 29th District. The district was in Yorkville, which was usually a Republican stronghold. He served in the Assembly in 1913. He lost the 1913 re-election to Republican Howard Conkling.

At one point, Carroll was a member of the law firm Sheehy, Carroll and McCormick. Specializing in admiralty law, he was associated with the admiralty division of the Corporation Counsel's office. In 1913, he went to Washington, D.C. as a lawyer for the United States Department of Commerce. He later became a senior attorney of the legal division of the United States Maritime Commission, with offices at 45 Broadway, and a special assistant to the United States Attorneys for the Southern District and Eastern District of New York. He still held those offices at the time of his death.

== Personal life ==
Carroll died at home from a heart attack on August 15, 1942. His wife's name was May and his children were Mercedes, Catherine, and John. He was buried in Gate of Heaven Cemetery.

New York State Assembly
Preceded by Thomas S. Coleman	New York State Assembly; New York County, 29th District; 1913	Succeeded by Howard Conkling
