= Nathan K. Hall =

American politician (1810–1874)

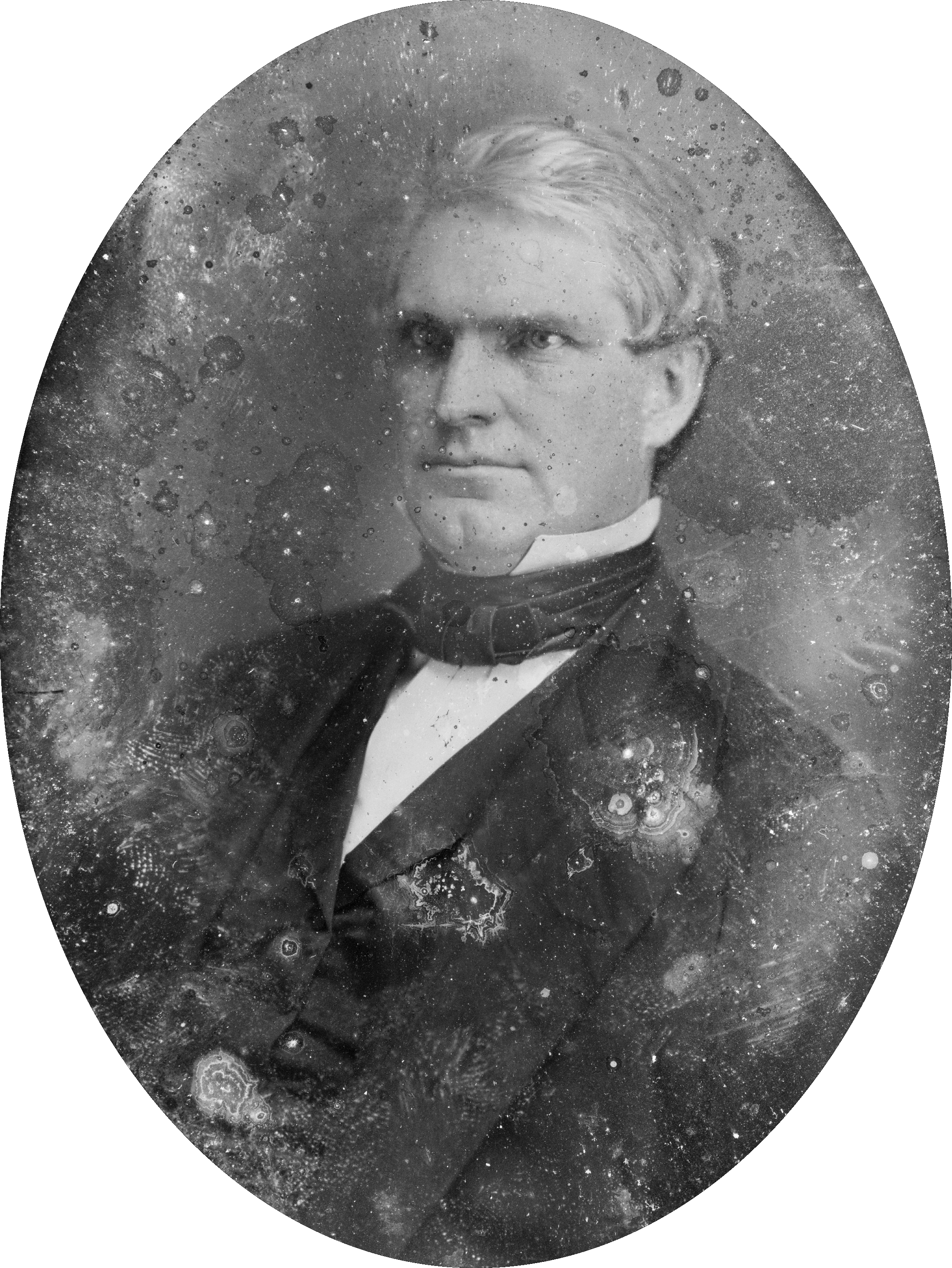

Judge of the United States District Court for the Northern District of New York
- In office August 31, 1852 – March 2, 1874
- Appointed by: Millard Fillmore
- Preceded by: Alfred Conkling
- Succeeded by: William James Wallace

14th United States Postmaster General
- In office July 23, 1850 – August 31, 1852
- President: Millard Fillmore
- Preceded by: Jacob Collamer
- Succeeded by: Samuel Dickinson Hubbard

Member of the U.S. House of Representatives from New York's 32nd district
- In office March 4, 1847 – March 3, 1849
- Preceded by: William A. Moseley
- Succeeded by: Elbridge G. Spaulding

Personal details
- Born: Nathan Kelsey Hall; March 28, 1810 Marcellus, New York, US
- Died: March 2, 1874 (aged 63) Buffalo, New York, US
- Resting place: Forest Lawn Cemetery (Buffalo)
- Party: Whig
- Education: read law

Nathan Kelsey Hall (March 28, 1810 – March 2, 1874) was a United States representative from New York, the 14th United States Postmaster General and a United States district judge of the United States District Court for the Northern District of New York.

Hall was nominated by President Millard Fillmore on August 13, 1852, to a seat vacated by Alfred Conkling. He was confirmed by the United States Senate on August 31, 1852, and received commission the same day. Hall's service was terminated on March 2, 1874, upon his death.

== Early life ==
Born on March 28, 1810, in Marcellus, Onondaga County, New York, Hall moved to Erie County, New York in his early youth and attended the district schools, and engaged in shoe-making and agricultural pursuits. He read law with future President Millard Fillmore in 1832. He entered private practice in Buffalo, New York from 1832 to 1850.

== Political career ==
Hall was clerk for the Board of Supervisors of Erie County from 1832 to 1838. He was city attorney for Buffalo from 1833 to 1834. He was an alderman for Buffalo in 1837. He was a Master in Chancery in Buffalo from 1839 to 1841, on the appointment of Governor of New York William H. Seward. He was a Judge of the Court of Common Pleas for Erie County from January 1841 to January 1845. He was a member of the New York State Assembly in 1846. Hall was elected as a Whig from New York's 32nd congressional district to the United States House of Representatives of the 30th United States Congress, serving from March 4, 1847, to March 3, 1849. He was not a candidate for renomination in 1848. Hall served as the 14th Postmaster General of the United States in the cabinet of President Millard Fillmore from July 23, 1850, to August 31, 1852.

He was later nominated by Fillmore on August 13, 1852, to a seat on the United States District Court for the Northern District of New York vacated by Judge Alfred Conkling. He was confirmed by the United States Senate on August 31, 1852, and received his commission the same day. His service terminated on March 2, 1874, due to his death in Buffalo. He was interred in Forest Lawn Cemetery in Buffalo.

== University of Buffalo ==
Hall was "particularly active in procuring the charter" of the University at Buffalo, which Fillmore was involved with founding in 1846.

== Sources ==
- United States Congress. "Nathan K. Hall (id: H000062)". Biographical Directory of the United States Congress.
- Nathan Kelsey Hall at the Biographical Directory of Federal Judges, a publication of the Federal Judicial Center.
- Works by Nathan K. Hall at Project Gutenberg
- Works by or about Nathan K. Hall at the Internet Archive

Political offices
Preceded by Jacob Collamer	United States Postmaster General; Served under: Millard Fillmore; 1850–1852	Succeeded by Samuel Dickinson Hubbard
U.S. House of Representatives
Preceded by William A. Moseley	Member of the U.S. House of Representatives from New York's 32nd congressional district 1847–1849	Succeeded by Elbridge G. Spaulding
Legal offices
Preceded by Alfred Conkling	Judge of the United States District Court for the Northern District of New York; 1852–1874	Succeeded by William James Wallace
