= John Fay (politician) =

American politician (1773–1855)

Member of the U.S. House of Representatives from New York's 14th district
- In office March 4, 1819 – March 3, 1821
- Preceded by: John Herkimer
- Succeeded by: Alfred Conkling

Personal details
- Born: February 10, 1773 Hardwick, Province of Massachusetts Bay, British America
- Died: June 21, 1855 (aged 82) Northampton, New York, U.S.
- Resting place: Old Presbyterian Church Cemetery
- Party: Democratic-Republican Party

John Fay (February 10, 1773 – June 21, 1855) was an American politician from New York who served as U.S. representative for New York's 4th congressional district from 1819 to 1821 as a Democratic-Republican. He previously served in the New York State Assembly between 1808 and 1809, and again in 1812.

== Life ==
Fay attended the common schools for a period of only six months. He removed to New York with his parents, who settled in Montgomery County, and later in Galway, Saratoga County.

In 1804, Fay removed to Northampton, then in Montgomery County. He became a land surveyor and later engaged in agricultural pursuits, milling, and manufacturing. He held various local offices and was Postmaster of Northampton for several years. He was a member from Montgomery County of the New York State Assembly in 1808–09 and 1812.

Fay was elected as a Democratic-Republican to the 16th United States Congress, holding office from March 4, 1819, to March 3, 1821. Afterwards he resumed his former activities. He was a presidential elector on the Democratic James K. Polk ticket in 1844.

He was buried at the Old Presbyterian Church Cemetery in Northampton.

U.S. House of Representatives
Preceded by John Herkimer	Member of the U.S. House of Representatives from New York's 14th congressional district 1819–1821	Succeeded by Alfred Conkling
