= Frederick A. Conkling =

American politician

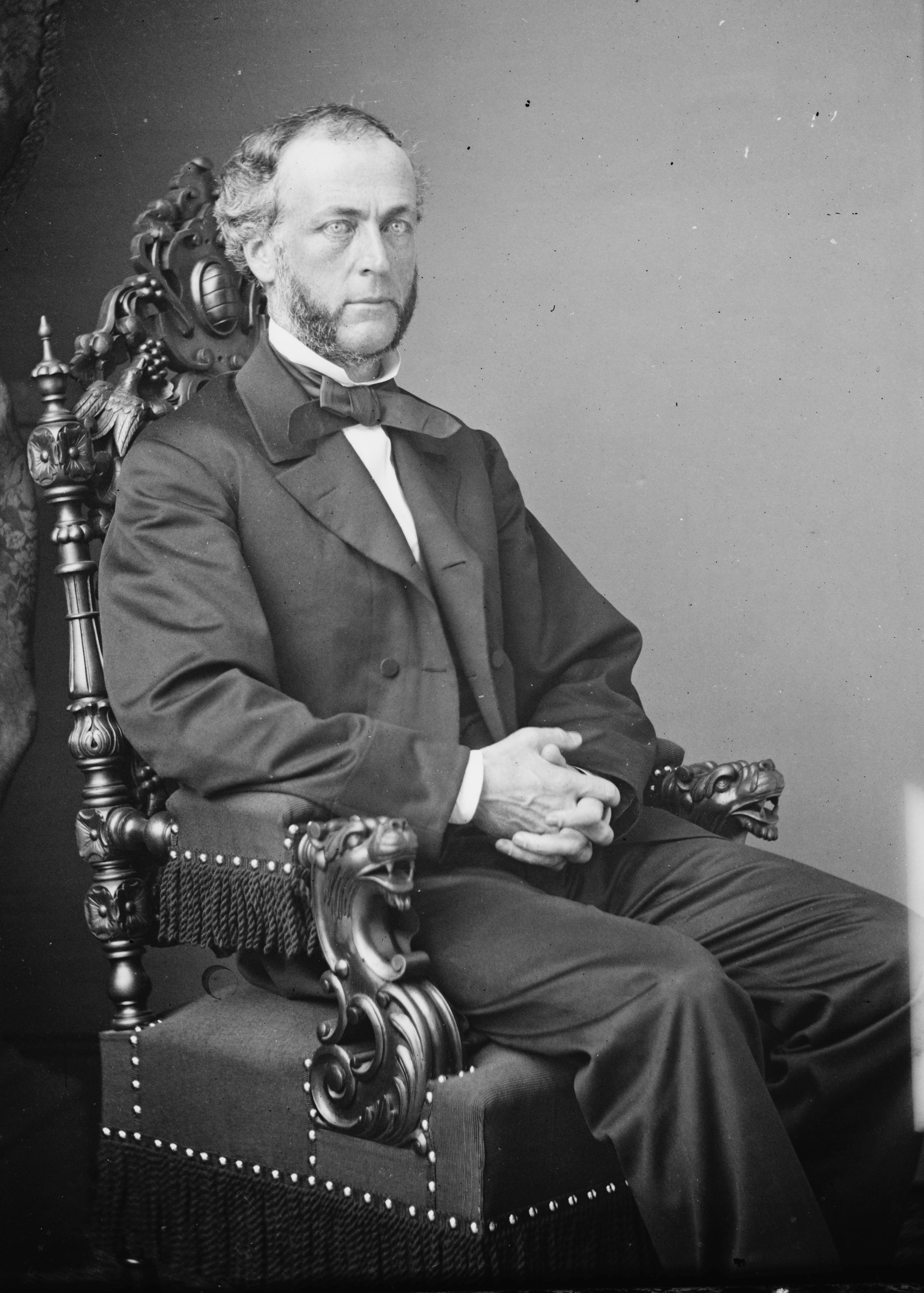
- Conkling between 1855 and 1865

Member of the U.S. House of Representatives from New York's 6th district
- In office March 4, 1861 – March 3, 1863
- Preceded by: John Cochrane
- Succeeded by: Elijah Ward

Member of the New York State Assembly from the 7th District
- In office January 1, 1859 – December 31, 1860
- Preceded by: David J. Chatfield
- Succeeded by: Daniel Young

Member of the New York State Assembly from the 13th District
- In office January 1, 1854 – December 31, 1854
- Preceded by: William Taylor
- Succeeded by: Richard M. Blatchford

Personal details
- Born: Frederick Augustus Conkling; August 22, 1816 Canajoharie, New York, U.S.
- Died: September 18, 1891 (aged 75) New York City, New York, U.S.
- Party: Republican, Liberal Republican, Democrat
- Spouse: Eleanora Lorillard Ronalds (died 1879)
- Parent(s): Alfred Conkling; Eliza Cockburn
- Relatives: Roscoe Conkling (brother)
- Education: The Albany Academy
- Profession: Politician, banker, executive, and writer

Frederick Augustus Conkling (August 22, 1816 – September 18, 1891) was a United States representative from New York during the American Civil War. He was also a reconstruction era banker, insurance company executive, and writer.

== Early life ==
Frederick Conkling was born in Canajoharie, Montgomery County, New York. He was one of five children born to U.S. Congressman Alfred Conkling (1789–1874) and Eliza Cockburn. He was the elder brother of U.S. Representative and Senator Roscoe Conkling (1829–1888).

He pursued classical studies and attended The Albany Academy.

== Career ==
He engaged in mercantile pursuits in New York City and became a member of the dry goods house of Conkling & Churchill. He was elected as a Republican to the New York State Assembly, serving in 1854, 1859, and 1860.

Conkling was elected as a Republican over Democrat John Winthrop Chanler, in the same election cycle that elevated Abraham Lincoln as a Republican to the presidency, to the Thirty-seventh Congress, holding office from March 4, 1861, to March 3, 1863. While in office, he was Chairman of the Ways and Means Committee. He was an unsuccessful candidate for reelection in 1862 to the 38th United States Congress.

=== U.S. Civil War ===
In June 1861 upon the outbreak of the U.S. Civil War, Conkling organized the 84th Regiment of New York Volunteers, becoming its Colonel, and went to the front at the first call for 100-day men. He initially served throughout the Shenandoah Valley Campaign and in 1863, his regiment was on duty as provost guard at Baltimore, Maryland.

=== Later career ===
After his defeat in Congress, he was an unsuccessful Republican candidate for mayor of New York City in 1868. Following this loss, he changed parties, becoming first a Liberal Republican and then a Democrat, speaking highly of Horace Greeley and Gen. Winfield Scott Hancock. He refused the Democratic nomination for Congress in his old district in 1874.

He was one of the organizers of the West Side Savings Bank of New York City and served as its president for many years; subsequently he became president of the Aetna Fire Insurance Co., of Hartford, Connecticut, and served until its dissolution in 1880. He authored numerous pamphlets on political, commercial, and scientific subjects.

== Personal life ==
Conkling was married to Eleanora Lorillard Ronalds (1825–1879), the daughter of Maria Dorothea Lorillard (1790–1848) and Thomas Alexander Ronalds (1788–1835), a New York merchant. Eleanora was the granddaughter of Pierre Lorillard II, the head of the Lorillard Tobacco Company, and a cousin of Catharine Lorillard Wolfe. Frederick and Eleanora were the parents of three children:

- Alfred Ronalds Conkling (1850–1917), a New York City Alderman and author who married Ethel Eastman Johnson (b. 1870), daughter of prominent painter Eastman Johnson.
- Howard Conkling (1855–1938), a noted lawyer.
- Helena Conkling.

Conkling died at his residence in New York City, 27 East 10th Street, on September 18, 1891, after a protracted illness extending over two years. He was buried in Green-Wood Cemetery in Brooklyn.

=== Descendants ===
Through his son Alfred, he was the grandfather of Gwendolyn Lorillard Conkling, Vivien Eastman H. Conkling, and Muriel Lorillard Ronalds Conkling (1898–1971), who married Baron Louis van Reigersberg Versluys (1883–1957) of Holland in 1922. Within one month of her wedding, her mother had married William H. Holden, and her 79-year-old grandmother had married 77 year old General Stillman F. Kneeland.

== See also ==
- Seymour-Conkling family

New York State Assembly
Preceded by William Taylor	New York State Assembly; New York County, 13th District; 1854	Succeeded by Richard M. Blatchford
Preceded by David J. Chatfield	New York State Assembly; New York County, 7th District; 1859–1860	Succeeded by Daniel Young
U.S. House of Representatives
Preceded by John Cochrane	Member of the U.S. House of Representatives from New York's 6th congressional district 1861–1863	Succeeded by Elijah Ward
