= Seymour-Conkling family =

Family of politicians from the US

The Seymour–Conkling family is a family of politicians from the United States.

- Horatio Seymour 1778–1857, U.S. Senator from Vermont 1821–1833.
- Henry Seymour 1780–1837, New York State Senator 1815–1819, 1821–1822. Brother of Horatio Seymour.
  - Origen S. Seymour 1804–1881, Connecticut State Representative 1842 1849–1850 1880, U.S. Representative from Connecticut 1851–1855, Judge in Connecticut 1855–1863, candidate for Governor of Connecticut 1864 1865, Justice of the Connecticut Supreme Court 1870–1874, Chief Justice of the Connecticut Supreme Court 1873–1874. Nephew of Horatio Seymour and Henry Seymour.
  - Horatio Seymour 1810–1886, New York Assemblyman 1842 1844–1846, Mayor of Utica, New York 1843; candidate for Governor of New York 1850; Governor of New York 1853–1855 1863–1865; candidate for the Democratic nomination for President of the United States 1860; delegate to the Democratic National Convention 1864; candidate for President of the United States 1868; Presidential Elector for New York 1876. Son of Henry Seymour.
    - Edward W. Seymour 1832–1892, Connecticut State Senator 1876, U.S. Representative from Connecticut 1873–1877. Son of Origin Storrs Seymour.
      - Horatio Seymour Jr., New York Surveyor 1878–1881. Nephew of Horatio Seymour.
- Alfred Conkling 1789–1874, U.S. Representative from New York 1821–1823, Judge of U.S. District Court of Northern District of New York 1825–1852, U.S. Minister to Mexico 1852–1853.
  - Frederick A. Conkling 1816–1891, U.S. Representative from New York 1861–1863. Son of Alfred Conkling.
  - Roscoe Conkling 1829–1888, Mayor of Utica, New York 1858–1859; U.S. Representative from New York 1859–1863 1865–1867; U.S. Senator from New York 1867 1869–1881; candidate for the Republican nomination for President of the United States 1876; delegate to the Republican National Convention 1880. Son of Alfred Conkling, brother-in-law of Horatio Seymour.
  - Alfred Conkling Coxe 1847–1923, Judge of U.S. District Court of Northern District of New York 1882, Judge of U.S. Court of Appeals 1902–1917. Nephew of Alfred Conkling.
