= Benjamin Mead =

Benjamin Mead may refer to:

- Benjamin P. Mead (1849–1913), Connecticut politician
- Benjamin C. Mead (1873–1934), American lawyer from New York
