= Union Garnet Chargers =

Sports program at Union College in Schenectady, New York

- University: Union College
- Nickname: Garnet Chargers
- Association: Division I ice hockey; Division III all other sports
- Conference: Liberty League, ECAC Hockey
- President: Elizabeth Kiss
- Athletic director: Jim McLaughlin
- Location: Schenectady, New York
- First year: 1874
- Sports: 27 (12 men's, 15 women's)
- Football stadium: Frank Bailey Field at Bertagna-Class of 1985 Stadium
- Basketball arena: Viniar Athletic Center
- Ice hockey arena: M&T Bank Center
- Baseball stadium: Central Park "A" Diamond
- Softball stadium: Alexander Field
- Soccer stadium: College Park Field
- Aquatics center: Alumni Gym Pool
- Golf course: Mohawk Golf Course
- Tennis venue: Union Tennis Courts
- Other venues: Brooks Field at Achilles Center
- Colors: Union garnet and white
- Mascot: Charger
- Website: www.unionathletics.com

Team NCAA championships
- 2014 NCAA DI Men's Hockey

Individual and relay NCAA champions
- 1996 NCAA DIII Men's 1m Diving: Brian Field; 1996 NCAA DIII Men's 100m Backstroke: Mike Humphreys

The Union Garnet Chargers comprise the 27 teams representing Union College in intercollegiate athletics, including men's and women's basketball, crew, cross country, ice hockey, lacrosse, soccer, swimming & diving, tennis, and track and field. Men's only sports include baseball and football. Women's only sports include field hockey, flag football, golf, softball, and volleyball.

== Name ==
On October 13, 1933, the school newspaper Concordiensis dubbed the Union College football team the "Dutchmen" despite the College's athletic teams being named the "Garnet" the school's color which was adopted in 1866. The nickname was widely adopted by local sports journalists with the two names, Garnet and Dutchmen, being used interchangeably for decades before Dutchmen eventually won out. The college eventually conceded and used the name Dutchmen, and later Dutchwoman, despite the name never being endorsed nor officially adopted by the school in any capacity. On February 2, 2023, Union College's president David R. Harris announced that the school would explore choosing a new nickname and mascot noting that while the name "Dutchmen" was popular, that it does "little to connect the College to prospective students" and "puts the College at a distinct disadvantage from a marketing and branding standpoint" while also clarifying "we don't find anything offensive with a Dutchman/Dutchwoman name."

The school created a website where students could propose new nicknames, with over 2,200 different ideas being proposed, with the school only seriously considering 400 of them. This would eventually get narrowed down to 20, including retaining the "Dutchmen", before four finalists where selected: "Garnet Chargers", "Garnet Hawks", "Garnet Griffins", and "Garnet Storm." The school also stated that while it would have liked to just adopt the "Garnet" as their logo, that it was already trademarked by Swarthmore College. On August 3, 2023, the school formally announced that it had chosen the "Garnet Chargers" as their new nickname and mascot, with the name being a reference to "Schenectady’s legacy as a leader in electrical technologies."

== Affiliation ==
The Garnet Chargers compete in the NCAA Division III and are members of the Liberty League for all sports except ice hockey, which competes in NCAA Division I as a member of ECAC Hockey.

== Sponsored sports ==
Men's sports	Women's sports
Baseball	Basketball
Basketball	Crew
Crew	Cross country
Cross country	Field Hockey
Football	Flag Football (spring 2027)
Ice hockey	Golf
Lacrosse	Ice hockey
Soccer	Lacrosse
Swimming & diving	Soccer
Tennis	Softball
Track and field^{1}	Swimming & diving
	Tennis
	Track and field^{1}
	Volleyball
^{1} – includes both indoor and outdoor.

== Notable athletes ==
- Jake Fishman (born 1995), Major League Baseball pitcher for the Miami Marlins, and Olympian for Team Israel
- Shayne Gostisbehere (born 1993), NHL player
- Ashley Johnston (born 1992), NWHL player
- Keith Kinkaid (born 1989), NHL player
