= Hiram C. Todd =

American lawyer (1876–1965)

Hiram Charles Todd (July 17, 1876 – April 7, 1965) was an American lawyer from New York.

== Early life and education ==
Todd was born on July 17, 1876, in Saratoga Springs, New York, the son of merchant Vernon Lawrence Todd and Anna Elizabeth Teftt.

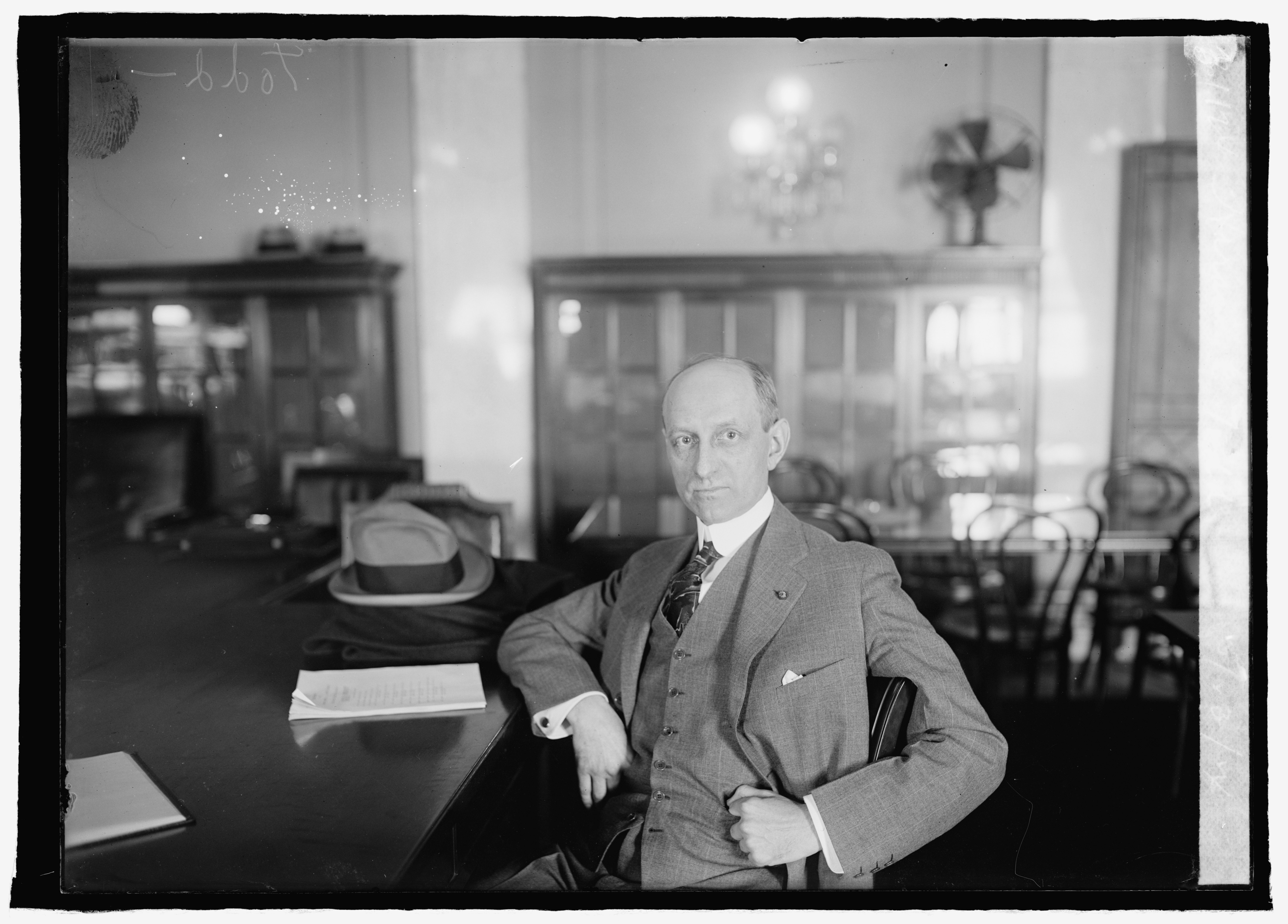

Todd attended Saratoga Springs High School. He then went to Union College, where he was editor-in-chief of the Garnet and associate editor of the Concordiensis and the Parthenon. He graduated with a Ph.B. in 1897.

== Career ==
=== Army career ===
In May 1898, during the Spanish-American War, he enlisted as a private in Company L, Second Regiment of the New York Volunteers Infantry. He was promoted to corporal shortly afterwards, and was appointed second lieutenant of Company A, 202nd New York Volunteers Infantry. He then served in Cuba for four months, and was mustered out in April 1899. He joined the New York National Guard after the war, serving with them for the next 15 years and serving as Lieutenant and Captain. During World War I, he served as Major, Judge Advocate with the 13th Division in Camp Lewis, Washington

=== Legal career ===
Todd was admitted to the bar in 1900, at which point he began practicing law with Edgar T. Brackett in Saratoga Springs. In 1917, he became a member of the law firm Brackett, Todd, Wheat & Wait. In 1922, he became a member of the firm Baldwin, Hutchins & Todd. In 1937, he was part of the firm Baldwin, Todd & Young. He eventually moved his law practice to New York City.

Todd was one of the counsel of managers in the impeachment of Governor William Sulzer. In July 1921, he was appointed United States Attorney for the Northern District of New York, an office he resigned from in September 1922. From 1922 to 1925, he was Special Assistant to United States Attorney General Daugherty in prosecuting striking train workers that deserted trains in the desert in Arizona and southern California He was also involved in the prosecution Gaston B. Means and Thomas Felder, and Thomas W. Miller. In 1929, he was Special Assistant of the New York County District Attorney in prosecution connected to the failure of the City Trust Company. From 1930 to 1931, he was Special Assistant of the Attorney General of New York in the prosecution of George F. Ewald. He again served as Special Assistant to the Attorney General in the prosecution of the Samuel Druckman murderers from 1936 to 1937. He also served as attorney for the petitioners to remove Brooklyn District Attorney William F. X. Geoghan from office in 1936. Over the years, he served as special investigator into government corruption for New York governors Franklin Roosevelt, Lehman, and Dewey, helping the latter investigate payroll padding by members of the New York State Legislature in 1944.

== Other activities and personal life ==
Todd was a trustee emeritus of Union College. He was a Republican. He was a member of the Elks, the New York City Bar Association, the University Club of New York, McGregor Links, and the New-York Historical Society. In 1901, he married Susan Thomas Lumpkin of Athens, Georgia, a descendant of Joseph Henry Lumpkin. She was a captain in the Red Cross Motor Corps at Saratoga Springs during World War I, an active participant in the auxiliaries of the United Spanish War Veterans and the American Legion, and a member of the Colonial Dames of America and the Daughters of the American Revolution. She died in 1946. Her and Todd's children were Mary Lumpkin, Susan, and Hiram Charles.

== Later life and death ==
Todd spent the last several years of his life in Copake Falls. He died on April 7, 1965, in Columbia Memorial Hospital in Hudson. He was buried in Greenridge Cemetery in Saratoga Springs.

In 1972, his house, known as the Hiram Charles Todd House, was listed in the National Register of Historic Places. He purchased the home from the Sackett family in 1927.

Legal offices
Preceded by Clarence E. Williams	United States Attorney for the Northern District of New York; 1921–1922	Succeeded by Earle Gallufo
