= Dismissal of U.S. attorneys controversy =

Dismissal of U.S. attorneys controversy may refer to

- 2006 dismissal of U.S. attorneys
- 2017 dismissal of U.S. attorneys
