= Madison Business College =

Former school in Madison, Wisconsin, 1858–1998

Coordinates: 42°59′43″N 89°31′04″W

Madison Business College was the name of a business college in Madison, Wisconsin, founded in 1858.

== History ==
The college was also known as Northwestern Business College and School of Shorthand, Capital City Commercial College, Madison College, Madison Junior College, and Madison Junior Business College; it closed on September 22, 1998.

Steiger's Educational Directory for 1878 classified it as, "Institute of Penmanship and Telegraph; Classical, Scientific and Musical Academy". In the mid-1880s, it issued at least two copies of a magazine named The School Visitor.

== Notable alumni ==
Notable alumni include:

- Liberian President and Nobel Prize winner Ellen Johnson Sirleaf
- Wisconsin governor Albert G. Schmedeman
- Wisconsin Secretary of State and legislator John S. Donald
- State Treasurer, and Assemblyman Andrew H. Dahl
- State Senator Albert M. Stondall
- State Assemblyman D. D. Conway
- State Assemblyman Joanne M. Duren
- State Assemblyman Hugh Pierce Jamieson
- State Assemblyman Daniel O. Mahoney
- State Assemblyman Edward C. Meland
- State Assemblyman Herbert C. Schenk
- State Assemblyman Thomas A. Stewart
- C. L. Brusletten, a member of the Minnesota House of Representatives
- George B. Curtiss, United States Attorney for the Northern District of New York
- Charles S. Eastman, a member of the South Dakota House of Representatives
- Leo Kieffer, Maine State Senator
