= George B. Curtiss =

American politician

George Boughton Curtiss
- Born: September 16, 1852; Mount Morris, New York
- Died: June 20, 1920 (aged 67); Binghamton, New York
- Occupation: Lawyer
- Years active: 1882 - 1920
- Known for: Protection and Prosperity (1896); The Industrial Development of the Nations (1912)

George Boughton Curtiss (September 16, 1852 – June 20, 1920) was an American lawyer from New York who authored two books on protectionism.

== Early life and education ==
Curtiss was born on September 16, 1852, in Mount Morris, New York, the son of George Curtiss and Hulda Boughton. His father moved to McHenry County, Illinois, near Marengo, to work as a farmer in 1856, enlisted as a soldier in the 127th Illinois Infantry Regiment at the start of the American Civil War, and died of a fever during the Siege of Vicksburg in 1863. Curtiss' now-widowed mother raised her five children on her own until her death in 1873. Curtiss attended an academic school in Marengo for two years. In early 1875, he began attending the Northwestern Business College in Madison, Wisconsin. He graduated from there in September 1875.

== Early career ==
Curtiss taught penmanship at an Elgin school as well as his own school in Woodstock. In the spring of 1876, he was hired by Daniel W. Lowell as professor of penmanship at Lowell's Business College in Binghamton, New York. He moved there that April, and spent the next four years working with the college. He also spent this time studying law in the office of Hotchkiss & Millard, later with A. De Witt Wales. He was admitted to the bar in 1880.

== Legal and government career ==
Curtiss initially worked for Wales' law office as a clerk. In 1882, he opened his own law office. In 1883, shortly after he argued his first court case, he was elected District Attorney of Broome County as a Republican. He was re-elected to the office in 1886, and finished his term there in 1890. He then returned to his private law practice. From 1887 to 1889 he had a law partnership with Taylor L. Arms. After Arms was elected County Judge and Surrogate, he entered a new law practice with W. W. Newell from 1892 to 1896, after which he practiced law on his own for a few years. In 1900, he formed the law firm Curtiss, Arms & Keenan with his former partner Arms and Thomas J. Keenan. After Arms died in 1909, the firm became Curtiss, Keenan & Tuttle.

In 1900, President McKinley appointed him the United States Attorney for the Northern District of New York. Presidents Theodore Roosevelt and William Howard Taft reappointed him to the office, and he served in that position for 13 years.

== Author of protectionism literature ==
Curtiss supported Protectionism. He wrote an influential, 300-page treatise on supporting the tariff called Protection and Prosperity, with introductions by William McKinley, Thomas B. Reed, and Levi P. Morton, in 1896. He also wrote The Industrial Development of the Nations in 1912.

Along with being a lawyer and working for the federal government, Curtiss was an honorary member of the American Protective Tariff League. At the request of the League he wrote a pamphlet, Abraham Lincoln Protectionist, in which he wrote "Washington introduced the American System of protection to domestic labor and industry, and Lincoln aided in establishing and perfecting that system."

== Personal life ==
Curtiss was a member of the Freemasons and the New York State Bar Association. In 1888, he married Mary D. Bliss. They had two daughters. Curtiss died at home on June 20, 1920. He was buried in Floral Park Cemetery in Johnson City.

Legal offices
Preceded by Charles H. Brown	U.S. Attorney for the Northern District of New York; 1900–1913	Succeeded by John H. Gleason
