= Mark F. Green =

American attorney

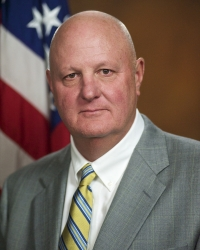

United States Attorney for the Eastern District of Oklahoma
- In office October 14, 2010 – March 10, 2017
- President: Barack Obama; Donald Trump
- Preceded by: Sheldon J. Sperling
- Succeeded by: Brian Kuester

Personal details
- Born: 1953 (age 72–73) Fort Smith, Arkansas, U.S.
- Education: University of Oklahoma (BA, JD)

Mark F. Green (born 1953) is an American lawyer from Oklahoma who served as the United States Attorney for the United States District Court for the Eastern District of Oklahoma, having served in that position from September 29, 2010, when he was appointed by President Barack Obama, until he was dismissed on March 10, 2017, by President Donald Trump.

== Biography ==
Mark F. Green graduated from the University of Oklahoma with a bachelor's degree in finance in 1975 and the OU College of Law with a Juris Doctor in 1978. After graduating, Green began working as an Assistant US Attorney for the United States District Court for the Eastern District of Oklahoma's U.S. Attorney's Office out of Muskogee, Oklahoma. Green left the office in 1983 to practice law privately in Muskogee. From 1983 to 1991, Green was a partner in the law firm of Green and Green with former U.S. Attorney Robert "Bruce" Green. Since 1991, Mark Green has been a sole practitioner handling a wide array of civil and criminal cases.

While practicing law privately, Green served as a member of the Muskogee City Council, a member of the Cherokee Nation Environmental Protection Commission, a member of the Oklahoma Scenic Reviers Commission, a member of the board of directors of the City of Muskogee Housing Authority, a tribal prosecutor with the Bureau of Indian Affairs and most recently as a Judge for the Municipal Court of the City of Muskogee.

== US Attorney ==
On Wednesday, July 14, 2010, a news release from the White House Press Office stated that President Barack Obama nominated Mark F. Green to be the new United States Attorney to succeed Sheldon J. Sperling. His nomination was confirmed by the United States Senate on September 29, 2010. He was sworn in on October 14, 2010.

== See also ==
- 2017 dismissal of U.S. attorneys

Legal offices
Preceded by Sheldon J. Sperling	United States Attorney for the Eastern District of Oklahoma; 2010–2017	Succeeded by Doug A. Horn (Acting)
