= Hiram Charles Todd House =

Historic house in New York, United States

- U.S. National Register of Historic Places
- U.S. Historic district – Contributing property
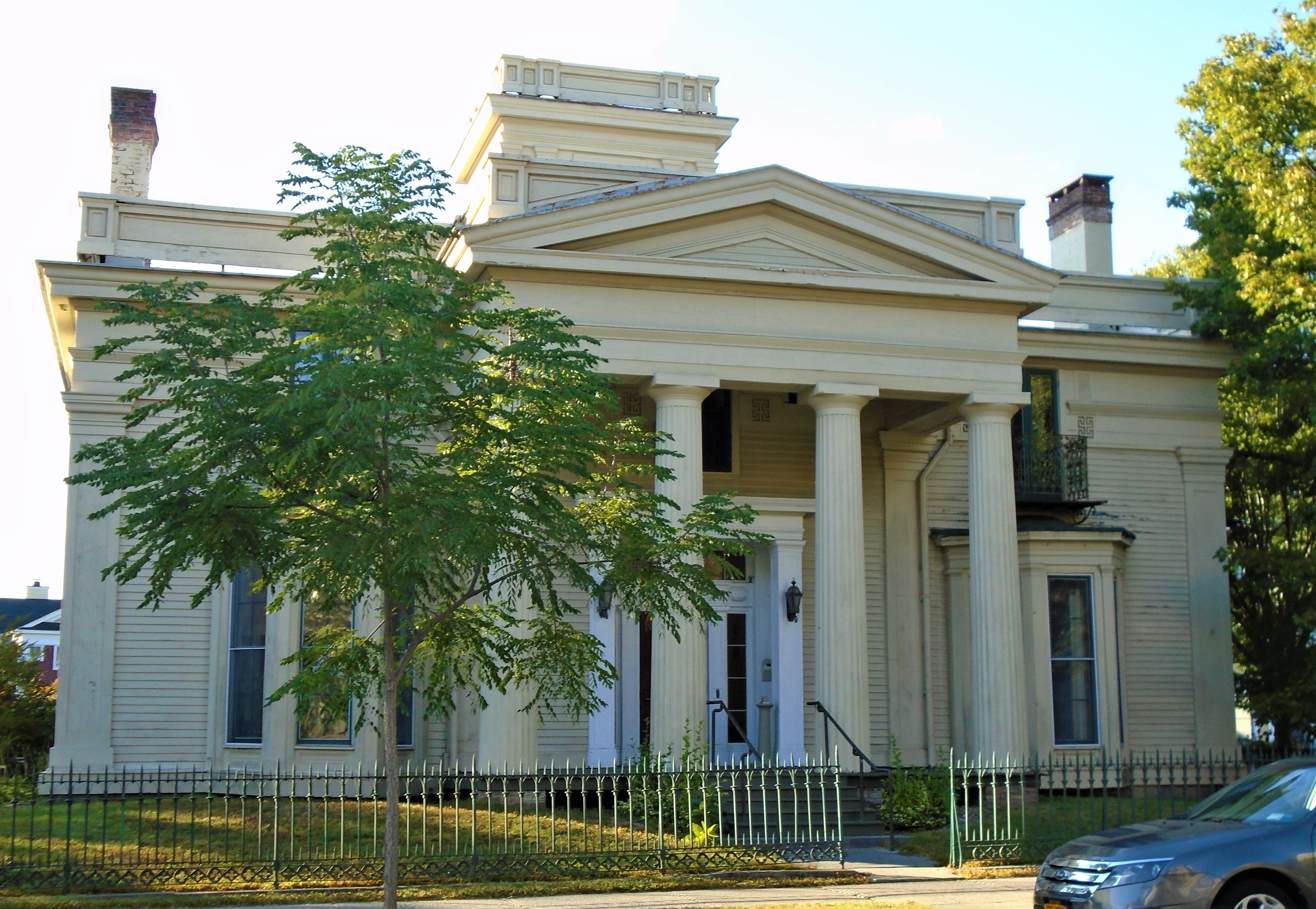
- Interactive map showing the location of the Hiram Charles Todd House
- Location: 4 Franklin Square; Saratoga Springs, New York
- Coordinates: 43°4′55″N 73°47′21″W
- Built: ca. 1837
- Architectural style: Greek Revival
- Part of: West Side Historic District (ID94000258)
- NRHP reference No.: 72000911
- Added to NRHP: May 31, 1972

The Hiram Charles Todd House, also known as the Marvin-Sackett-Todd House, is located at 4 Franklin Square in Saratoga Springs, Saratoga County, New York. It is a Greek Revival house built in the 1830s by a local hotelier. Later it was home to Hiram Charles Todd, a descendant of one of the original owners who was active in New York state politics.

The house remains intact today with almost no alterations. In 1972 it was listed on the National Register of Historic Places, the very first listing in Saratoga Springs. Later that year it became a contributing property to the Franklin Square Historic District. Two decades later that district became part of the new West Side Historic District. It is currently used as office space for several local businesses.

== Building ==
The house is located on the corner of Franklin Street just south of the square. The neighborhood is residential, with large trees lining the streets. The other houses are similar in size to the Todd House, either in Greek Revival as well or other Victorian styles. An iron fence runs along the north and east edges of the property; there is a parking lot in the rear.

It is two stories high, with a square three-by-three-bay central block and seven-bay T-shaped rear wing. The siding is clapboard over wood frame with diagonal brick braces. A wide entablature goes down to the middle of the second story windows; fretwork flanks the three on the east (front) facade. The main entrance is flanked by projecting bay windows. The mostly flat roof is pierced by six chimneys.

On that elevation, a full-height pedimented portico with four Doric fluted columns shelters the main entrance. It is one of five porches on the building. Two on the north side, facing Division Street, have colonnades echoing that on the front. On the west (rear), the only portion of the building with a gabled roof, there is a small upstairs porch and larger enclosed one downstairs.

Inside, the central hall has a double staircase that converges into a curved single one. The drawing room runs the length of the south side of the house on the first story. It is divided with a semi-elliptical arch. On the west end of the living room two French doors lead into the music room.

== History ==
The house was built by Thomas Marvin, a nephew of the founder of the United States Hotel, one of Saratoga Springs' early resorts. The exact date is unknown, but it was likely built in 1837, around the time of his marriage. Marvin at the time was co-owner of the hotel along with his brother, and the house faced the rear of the hotel across the square, originally called Marvin Square after the family. The front bay windows were added shortly after it was built.

During the house's construction, in 1833, Marvin heard of the proposed rail link that would connect the village with existing tracks at Ballston Spa. He sold a piece of land to the railroad so that the trains could run past the house and the hotel. The house thus became a landmark of Saratoga Springs to visitors.

It remained with the Marvins and their descendants for a century. Two of them were active in politics. William A. Sackett, Marvin's son-in-law served as a congressman around 1850, and later spent his last years in the house. Hiram Charles Todd, a lawyer and friend of the Sackett family who had served as U.S. Attorney for the Northern District of New York, inherited the house in 1927. It has since been reused as private office space.

== See also ==
- National Register of Historic Places listings in Saratoga County, New York
