= R. Trent Shores =

American attorney

Trent Shores
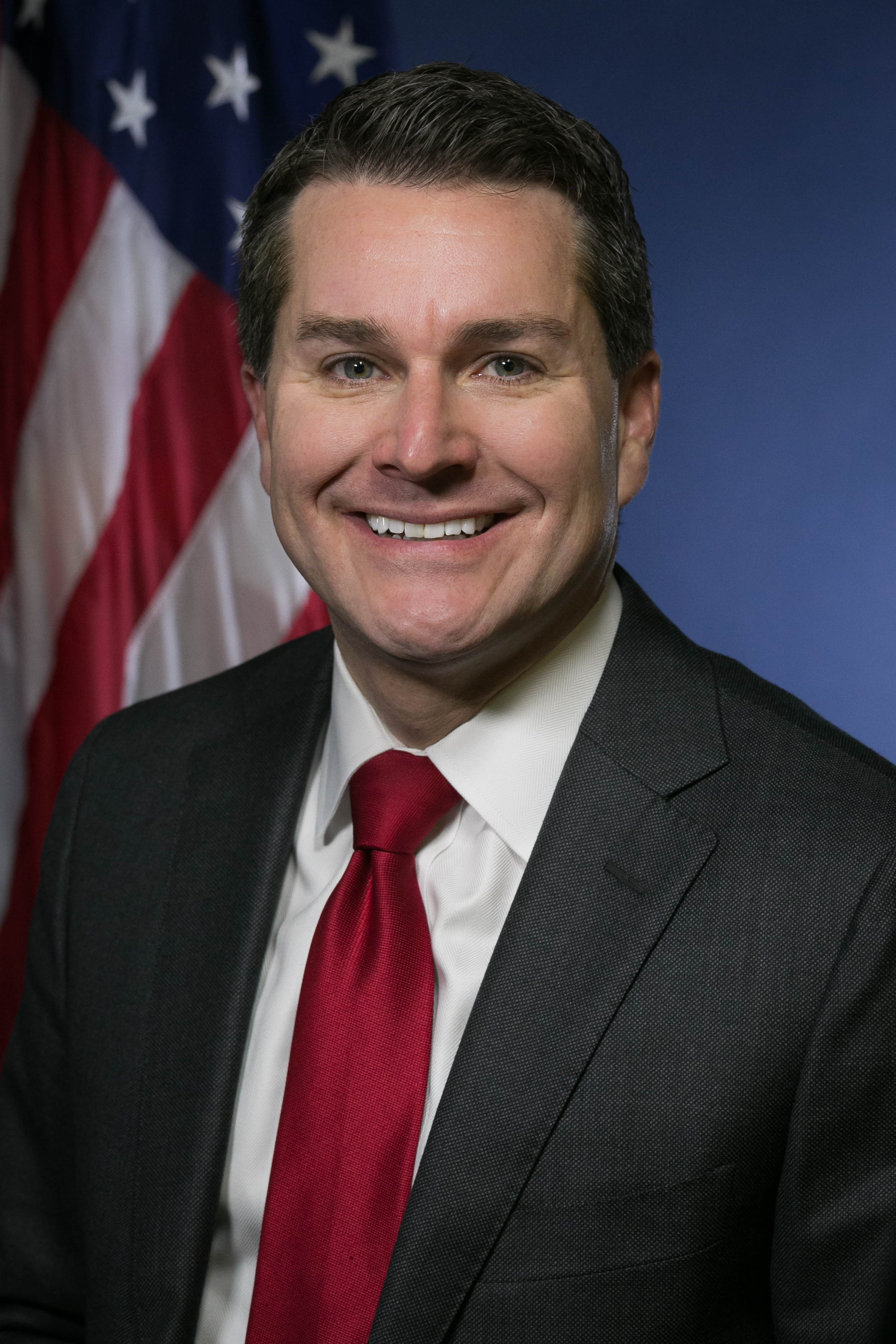

United States Attorney for the Northern District of Oklahoma
- In office September 21, 2017 – February 28, 2021
- President: Donald Trump; Joe Biden
- Preceded by: Danny C. Williams Sr.
- Succeeded by: Clinton Johnson

Personal details
- Born: 1976 or 1977 (age 48–49)
- Party: Republican
- Education: Vanderbilt University (BA); University of Oklahoma (JD)

Robert Trent Shores (born 1976/1977) is an American attorney who was the United States Attorney for the Northern District of Oklahoma from 2017 to 2021.

== Education ==
Trent Shores graduated with a political science degree from Vanderbilt University and received his Juris Doctor from the University of Oklahoma College of Law.

== Career ==
Prior to becoming United States Attorney, Shores was an Assistant United States Attorney in the Northern District of Oklahoma from 2007-2017. Shores was a National Security Cyber Specialist and Anti-Human Trafficking Coordinator for the Northern District. He prosecuted cases involving human trafficking and child exploitation, bank robbery, drug-trafficking organizations, public corruption, and white-collar crime. Some of his most notable prosecutions involved dismantling international human trafficking organizations as well as regional traffickers preying on Oklahoma children. Shores also served as the Tribal Liaison working with tribal nations within Oklahoma’s borders. Shores started his justice career as the Deputy Director at the United States Department of Justice’s Office of Tribal Justice. Shores also advised the United States State Department and served as a member of a U.S. Delegation to the United Nations, advocating on behalf of the United States in Geneva, Switzerland.

In March 2015, Scott Pruitt, the Attorney General of the State of Oklahoma at the time, appointed Shores as the First Assistant Attorney General. Shores, however, returned a short time later to the U.S. Attorney's Office as an Assistant United States Attorney in the Northern District of Oklahoma focusing on national security cybersecurity matters and taking down international and domestic human trafficking organizations.

Shores previously was the deputy director for the United States Department of Justice's Office of Tribal Justice, where he was active in tribal justice issues.

Shores is a citizen of the Choctaw Nation of Oklahoma. As an Oklahoman, Shores has written and spoken about the impact on his life of the Oklahoma City bombing’s unspeakable violence and his that, in part, drove him toward a career at the Justice Department. Shores is also known to be active in supporting military veterans and their families, especially at VFW Post 3656 in Bristow, Oklahoma where his grandfathers named is inscribed on a memorial wall commemorating the brave men who defended Wake Island in World War II.

=== United States Attorney for the Northern District of Oklahoma ===
In June 2017, President Donald Trump nominated Shores to serve as the United States Attorney in the Northern District of Oklahoma. The Senate approved his appointment on September 14, 2017. Shores was officially sworn into the office on September 21, 2017 with an official ceremony being held on December 15, 2017. United States Attorneys General Jeff Sessions and William Barr both appointed Shores to their Attorney General’s Advisory Councils. Shores also was appointed as Chair of the Native American Issues Subcommittee to the Attorney General’s Advisory Council. Shores participated in a pilot project prioritizing federal efforts to address the missing and murdered indigenous persons crisis. While an U.S. Attorney, Shores created and launched the “2150 Initiative” in partnership with the Tulsa Police Department and the Bureau of Alcohol, Tobacco, Firearms and Explosives. The 2150 Initiative aims at reducing gun violence and is named after the badge number of Sergeant Craig Johnson, a Tulsa Police Officer killed in 2020.

In 2019 Shores was appointed by President Trump to co-chair the Presidential Task Force on Protecting Native American Children in the Indian Health Service System and in 2020 the task force presented its results to first lady Melania Trump.

On February 8, 2021, he along with 55 other Trump-era attorneys were asked to resign. After nearly eighteen total years of service to the United States Department of Justice, Shores announced his resignation on February 9, effective February 28.

=== Kaw Nation Supreme Court Judgeship ===
In 2021, Shores was confirmed as a Supreme Court Justice for the Kaw Nation.

=== Private Practice ===
On March 29, 2021, Shores joined Tulsa-based law firm GableGotwals as a Shareholder. His practice includes complex litigation, cybersecurity, Native American law and policy, False Claims Act matters, and corporate and government investigations. In 2021 he was named as a member of the U.S. Global Leadership Coalition’s Oklahoma Advisory Committee.
