= 2017 dismissal of U.S. attorneys =

Trump administration controversy

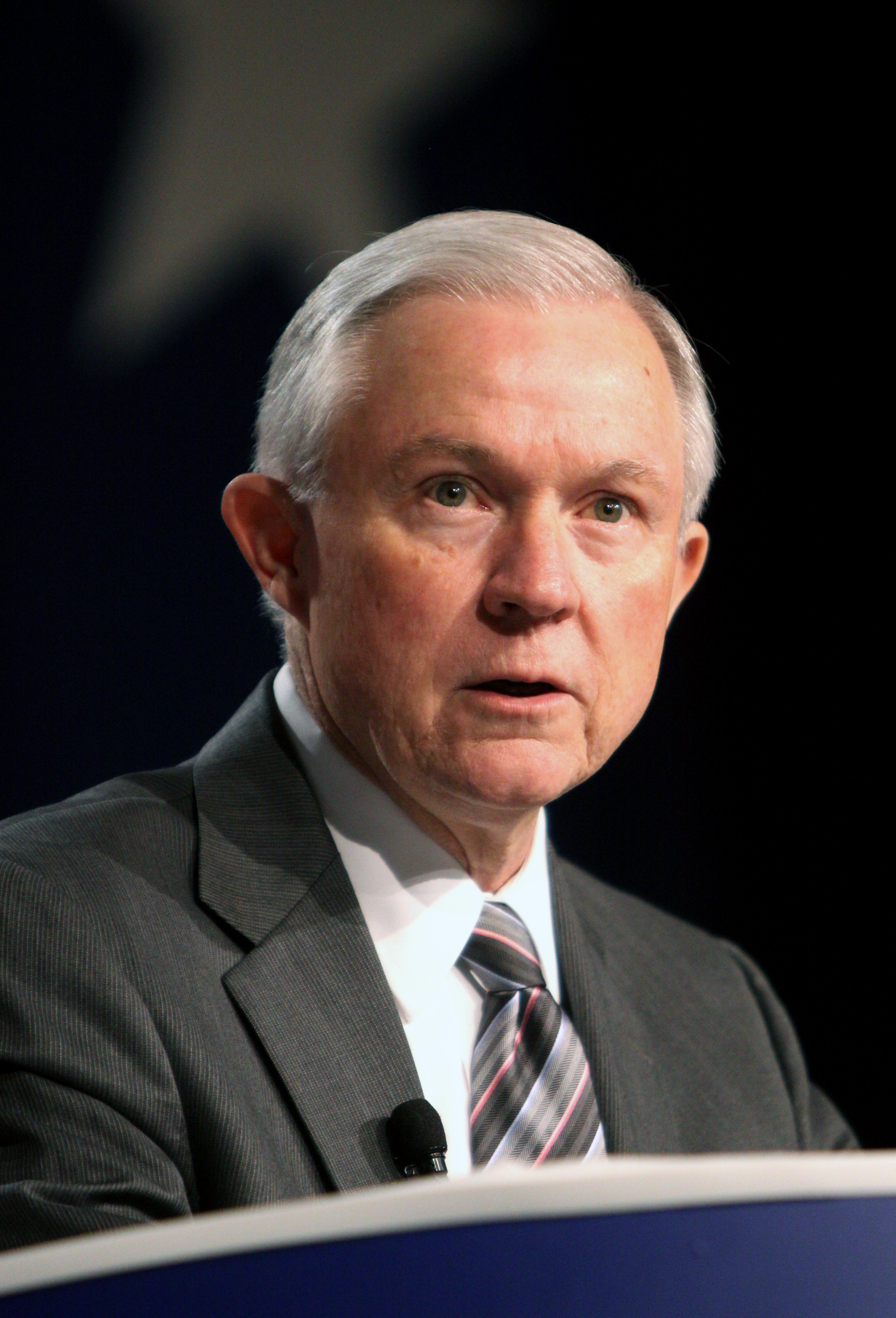
Jeff Sessions, U.S. attorney general, requested the resignations of 46 U.S. attorneys on March 10, 2017.

On March 10, 2017, Jeff Sessions, who was appointed United States attorney general by President Donald Trump, requested the resignations of 46 United States attorneys. Some resignations were declined by Sessions or Trump. Media outlets described Sessions' move as abrupt and unexpected but not unprecedented. When a new president enters office, many sitting U.S. attorneys typically depart on their own initiative before their term in office has concluded, or are asked to resign. The other 47 U.S. attorney posts were either already vacant by the end of Barack Obama's administration or the incumbent U.S. attorney had resigned at the beginning of Trump's administration.

Similarly, in February 2021, 56 Trump-era attorneys were asked to resign by the end of the month during the Biden administration and, in February 2025, all remaining Biden-era attorneys were fired during the second Trump administration.

== Resignations and dismissals ==
1. Felicia C. Adams, U.S. attorney for the Northern District of Mississippi
2. George L. Beck Jr., U.S. attorney for the Middle District of Alabama
3. A. Lee Bentley III, U.S. attorney for the Middle District of Florida
4. Preet Bharara, U.S. attorney for the Southern District of New York (dismissed)
5. Dana Boente, U.S. attorney for the Eastern District of Virginia and Acting U.S. Deputy Attorney General
6. Daniel Bogden, U.S. attorney for the District of Nevada
7. Kenyen R. Brown, U.S. attorney for the Southern District of Alabama
8. Richard G. Callahan, U.S. attorney for the Eastern District of Missouri
9. Robert Capers, U.S. attorney for the Eastern District of New York
10. David A. Capp, U.S. attorney for the Northern District of Indiana
11. Michael W. Cotter, U.S. attorney for the District of Montana
12. Christopher A. Crofts, U.S. attorney for the District of Wyoming
13. Deirdre M. Daly, U.S. attorney for the District of Connecticut
14. Gregory K. Davis, U.S. attorney for the Southern District of Mississippi
15. Eileen Decker, U.S. attorney for the Central District of California
16. Thomas E. Delahanty II, U.S. attorney for the District of Maine
17. Tammy Dickinson, U.S. attorney for the Western District of Missouri
18. Zachary T. Fardon, U.S. attorney for the Northern District of Illinois
19. Stephanie A. Finley, U.S. attorney for the Western District of Louisiana
20. Paul J. Fishman, U.S. attorney for the District of New Jersey
21. John P. Fishwick, Jr., U.S. attorney for the Western District of Virginia
22. Deborah R. Gilg, U.S. attorney for the District of Nebraska
23. Mark F. Green, U.S. attorney for the Eastern District of Oklahoma
24. J. Walter Green, U.S. attorney for the Middle District of Louisiana
25. Richard S. Hartunian, U.S. attorney for the Northern District of New York
26. John W. Huber, U.S. attorney for the District of Utah
27. Alicia Limtiaco, U.S. attorney for the Districts of Guam and the Northern Mariana Islands
28. Karen L. Loeffler, U.S. attorney for the District of Alaska
29. Andrew M. Luger, U.S. attorney for the District of Minnesota
30. Barbara L. McQuade, U.S. attorney for the Eastern District of Michigan
31. Kenneth Magidson, U.S. attorney for the Southern District of Texas
32. Damon P. Martinez, U.S. attorney for the District of New Mexico
33. Florence T. Nakakuni, U.S. attorney for the District of Hawaii
34. Peter Neronha, U.S. attorney for the District of Rhode Island
35. Charles Oberly, U.S. attorney for the District of Delaware
36. Michael C. Ormsby, U.S. attorney for the Eastern District of Washington
37. Kenneth Polite, U.S. attorney for the Eastern District of Louisiana
38. Carole Rendon, U.S. attorney for the Northern District of Ohio
39. Emily Gray Rice, U.S. attorney for the District of New Hampshire
40. David Rivera, U.S. attorney for the Middle District of Tennessee
41. Rod Rosenstein, U.S. attorney for the District of Maryland
42. Ronald Sharpe, U.S. attorney for the District Court of the Virgin Islands
43. Ed Tarver, U.S. attorney for the Southern District of Georgia
44. Kevin Techau, U.S. attorney for the Northern District of Iowa
45. Chris Thyer, U.S. attorney for the Eastern District of Arkansas
46. John W. Vaudreuil, U.S. attorney for the Western District of Wisconsin
47. Danny C. Williams Sr., U.S. attorney for the Northern District of Oklahoma

=== Declined resignations ===
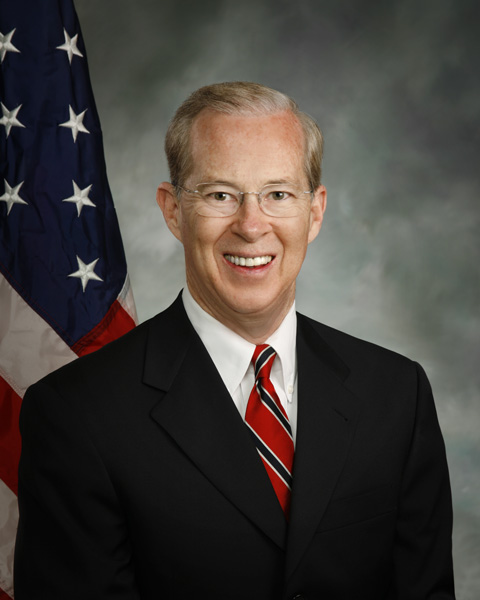
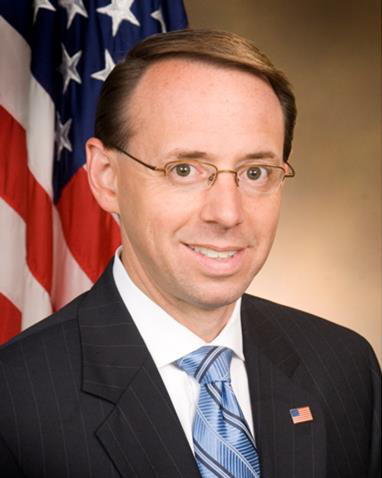
President Donald Trump declined to accept the resignations of Dana Boente (left) and Rod Rosenstein (right).

Trump declined to accept the resignations of Boente (Eastern District of Virginia), who was serving as acting deputy attorney general, and Rosenstein (District of Maryland), whom Trump had selected to become deputy attorney general. Trump also allowed Daly (District of Connecticut) and Hartunian (Northern District of New York) to remain in office for a period of several months until they completed 20 years of service at the Justice Department.

== Reactions ==
=== Media ===
Initial media reports described Sessions' move as abrupt and unexpected, but not unprecedented. Slate's Leon Neyfakh accused media outlets of sensationalizing Sessions' actions, which he said were "nothing particularly unusual or surprising," and noted the mass firings of U.S. attorneys accompanying each presidential transition. National Review pointed out that Janet Reno began her tenure as President Bill Clinton's attorney general in March 1993 by firing U.S. attorneys for 93 of the 94 federal districts, this being more than twice as many as Trump attorney general Sessions fired on Friday. The Washington Post contrasted the Trump administration's decision with those of George W. Bush and Barack Obama, who replaced U.S. attorneys gradually.

Sessions' move came less than 24 hours after Sean Hannity, the Fox News commentator and host of The Sean Hannity Show, called for the "immediate expulsion," or a "purge," of Obama appointees at the United States Justice Department in his show's opening monologue.

=== Politicians ===
Senator Dianne Feinstein (D-CA), the ranking member of the Judiciary Committee, criticized the "abrupt firing. " She said, "Under previous administrations, orderly transitions allowed U.S. attorneys to leave gradually as their replacements were chosen. This was done to protect the independence of our prosecutors and avoid disrupting ongoing federal cases. At a time when attorney General Sessions has recused himself from major investigations into the Trump campaign, the independence of federal prosecutors could not be more important."

Tim Purdon, who served as U.S. attorney for the District of North Dakota from 2010 to 2015, said: "The way the Obama administration handled it was appropriate and respectful and classy. This saddens me because many of these people are great public servants and now they are being asked to leave."

Senator Chuck Schumer (D-NY) said he was "troubled to learn of reports of requests for resignations from the remaining U.S. attorneys, particularly that of Preet Bharara." Other politicians expressed dismay, such as former Vermont Governor Howard Dean, Massachusetts U.S. Senator Elizabeth Warren, New York State Republican Assemblyman Steve McLaughlin, and Brian Kolb, the Assembly Leader, over Bharara's firing.

=== Resignees ===
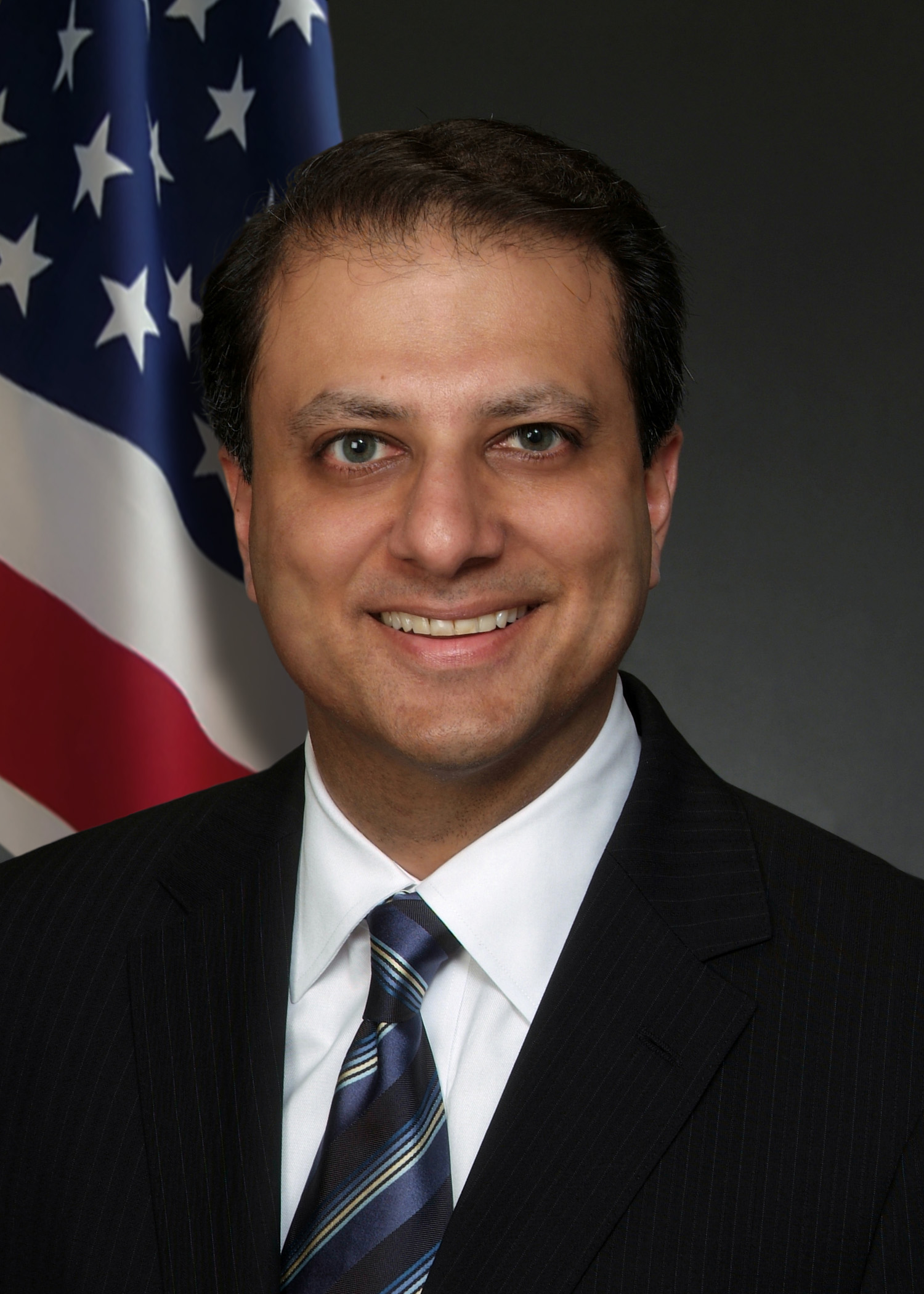
Preet Bharara said he was fired after refusing to submit his resignation.

Bharara said he was fired and did not resign. He had been asked to maintain his position in November 2016 by then President-elect Trump. Trump's Secretary of the Department of Health and Human Services, Tom Price, traded stocks of health-related corporations during the time period when Price was working on crafting the legislation that would affect those firms. Bharara was said to have been supervising an investigation about the propriety of those trades. The administration did not respond to questions regarding the relationship. Bharara was also reported to have been investigating the reports via CNN, The New York Times, The Washington Times, New York magazine, among other sources, that Fox News had covered up dozens of reports of sexual assault and harassment by its dismissed former chairman and CEO Roger Ailes, generating potential tort liabilities that should have been disclosed to its shareholders. Fox attorney and potential Bharara replacement Marc Mukasey declined to comment on these reports as well.

In his resignation statement, Capers wrote, "This afternoon, I was instructed to resign my position as United States attorney for the Eastern District of New York, effective March 10, 2017. It has been my greatest honor to serve my country, New York City and the people of this district for almost 14 years, with the last 17 months serving as United States attorney."

Capp said in a written statement, "After 31 years at the United States Attorney’s Office I have submitted my resignation as United States attorney. I had advised my office last summer that it was my plan to retire in 2017. I had been looking toward a June retirement, so this is just a few months earlier. It has been my greatest honor and privilege to serve all these years. The work we do in the United States Attorney’s Office has such an important positive impact on the citizens of northern Indiana. I want to thank the men and women of the USAO for their dedication and professionalism, day-in and day-out."

Cotter said, "I think it's very unprofessional and I'm very disappointed. What happened today on Friday, March 10, that was so important that all Obama appointees who are US attorneys need to be gone? I gotta write that (resignation) letter. It's going to be a one-liner."

Daly's office released a statement which said, "It has been a great honor and privilege to serve as Connecticut's United States attorney. In fact, it has been a gift of a lifetime. I am extremely proud of the tremendous accomplishments of the men and women of this office during my tenure."

Delahanty said, "I didn’t really get a chance to wrap up any loose ends. By Monday morning, my email and iPhone had been shut off."

Fishman said in his statement, "It has been the greatest professional experience that I can possibly imagine to have served in this office for the past seven-and-a-half years. Having spent so much of my career working to protect the interests of the people of New Jersey, I can think of no greater form of public service. I am enormously grateful for the opportunity I was given to lead the men and women who work in this office. They are the most extraordinary group of public servants I have ever known, and I am more than honored to have been their colleague."

Magidson's release said, "It has been privilege and an honor to serve as the United States attorney for the Southern District of Texas. It has been a hallmark of my administration to ensure that our office lived up to the ideals of justice. The ability to everyday protect the interests of the United States has truly been a great blessing and a hallmark of my career. I am confident that our office will continue to live up to these ideals."

McQuade said, "I have loved serving in this job as much as anyone has ever loved any job. It has been an incredible privilege to work alongside public servants who devote their tremendous talents to improving the quality of life in our community. I am proud to have served as U.S. attorney in the Obama Administration."

== See also ==
- Dismissal of U.S. attorneys controversy (2006)
