= Brian Kuester =

American attorney

Brian J. Kuester
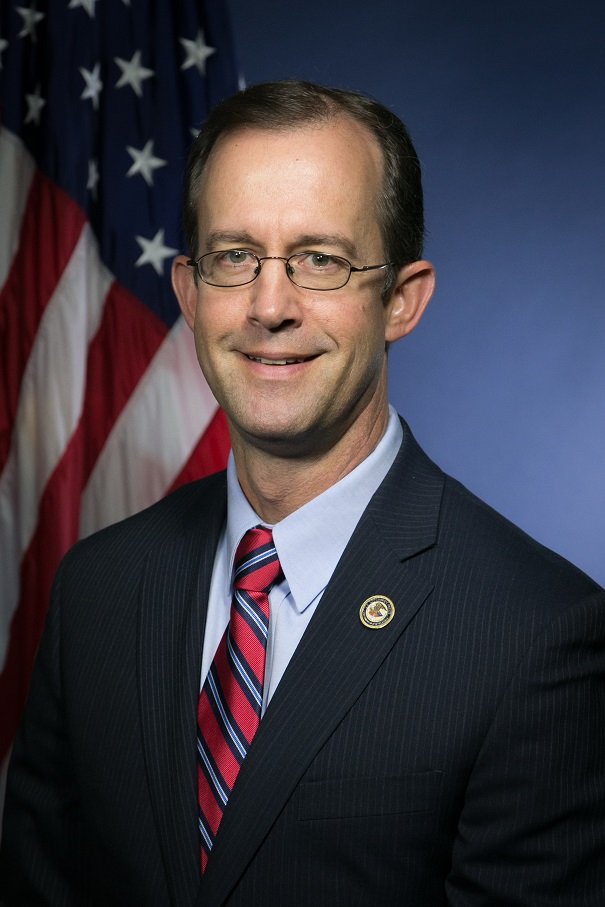

United States Attorney for the Eastern District of Oklahoma
- In office September 25, 2017 – February 28, 2021
- President: Donald Trump; Joe Biden
- Preceded by: Mark F. Green
- Succeeded by: Christopher Wilson (acting)

Personal details
- Education: University of Central Missouri (BS); University of Tulsa College of Law (JD)

Brian J. Kuester is an American lawyer who served as the United States Attorney for the Eastern District of Oklahoma from 2017 to 2021. He previously served as the District Attorney for District 27 in Oklahoma.

== Education and career ==
Kuester received his Bachelor of Science from the University of Central Missouri in 1990 and his Juris Doctor from the University of Tulsa College of Law in 2000. Prior to law school, Kuester was a police officer. He was previously an associate at Robinette & Osmond and staff counsel for Allstate. Kuester has also served as an Assistant District Attorney for the Tulsa County District Attorney's office. In November 2010, he was elected as the District Attorney for District 27 in Oklahoma. He was re-elected in 2014.

In June 2017, President Donald Trump nominated Kuester to become United States Attorney for the Eastern District of Oklahoma. He was confirmed by the United States Senate by voice vote on September 14, 2017.

On February 8, 2021, he along with 55 other Trump-era attorneys were asked to resign. He resigned on February 28, 2021.
