= Carla B. Freedman =

American lawyer (born 1963)

Carla Freedman
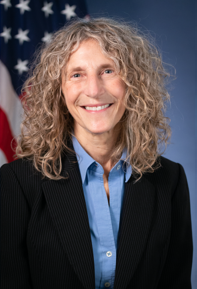
- Freedman in 2022

United States Attorney for the Northern District of New York
- In office October 8, 2021 – February 17, 2025
- President: Joe Biden; Donald Trump
- Preceded by: Grant Jaquith
- Succeeded by: Daniel Hanlon (acting)

Personal details
- Born: 1963 (age 62–63) Ann Arbor, Michigan, United States
- Party: Democratic
- Education: Syracuse University (BA); New York Law School (JD)

Carla Beth Freedman (born 1963) is an American lawyer who served as the United States Attorney for the Northern District of New York from 2021 to 2025.

== Education ==
Freedman earned a Bachelor of Arts degree from Syracuse University in 1985 and a Juris Doctor from the New York Law School in 1988.

== Career ==
From 1988 to 2004, Freedman was an assistant district attorney in the New York County District Attorney's Office in Manhattan, where she led a unit that focused on investigating organized crime from 1997 to 2004. From 2007 to 2021, she served as Assistant United States Attorney in the United States Attorney's Office for the Northern District of New York. From 2018 to 2021, she was the narcotics chief for the office.

=== U.S. attorney for the Northern District of New York ===
In March 2021, Freedman was recommended to the position of U.S. Attorney by Senator Kirsten Gillibrand. On August 10, 2021, President Joe Biden nominated Freedman to be the United States attorney for the Northern District of New York. On September 30, 2021, her nomination was reported out of committee by voice vote. On October 5, 2021, her nomination was confirmed in the United States Senate by voice vote. On October 8, 2021, Freedman was sworn in as the United States Attorney for the Northern District of New York by Glenn T. Suddaby, the Chief United States District Judge of the United States District Court for the Northern District of New York. Freedman was the first woman to hold this position.

On February 17, 2025, Freedman resigned.

== Personal life ==
Freedman is a registered Democrat.

Legal offices
Preceded by Antoinette T. Bacon; Acting	United States Attorney for the Northern District of New York; 8 October 2021 – 17 February 2025	Incumbent
