= Danny C. Williams Sr. =

American attorney

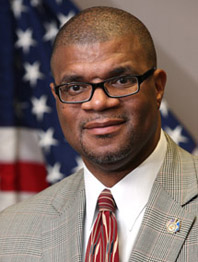

United States Attorney for the Northern District of Oklahoma
- In office August 7, 2012 – March 10, 2017
- President: Barack Obama; Donald Trump
- Preceded by: Thomas Scott Woodward (acting)
- Succeeded by: R. Trent Shores

Personal details
- Party: Democratic
- Education: Dillard University (BA); University of Tulsa College of Law (JD)

Danny C. Williams Sr. is an American attorney who served as the United States Attorney for the Northern District of Oklahoma from 2012 to 2017.

== See also ==
- 2017 dismissal of U.S. attorneys
