= Oliver D. Burden =

American lawyer (1873–1947)

Oliver Dudley Burden (March 15, 1873 – November 10, 1947) was an American lawyer from New York. He was the United States Attorney for the Northern District of New York from 1923 to 1936.

== Early life ==
Burden was born on March 15, 1873, in Nelson, New York, the son of landowner James H. Burden and Lucia Groesbeck.

Burden attended Cazenovia High School and graduated from Cazenovia Academy (now Cazenovia College) in 1891. He then attended Cornell University and received a Bachelor of Philosophy and Bachelor of Law 1896. from the school. He graduated from Cornell Law School in 1897, and studied law under Judge Michael H. Kiley of Cazenovia.

== Career ==
In 1898 he moved to Syracuse and began practicing law with M. E. and G. W. Driscoll. In 1899, he started practicing law with R. J. Shanahan. He was an active member of the Republican Party. He later practiced law with George R. Fearon. During World War I, he was chairman of Local Draft Board 469 in Syracuse.

In 1915, he was one of former President Theodore Roosevelt's attorneys during a libel lawsuit New York Republican state chairman William Barnes brought forward after Roosevelt called Barnes a corrupt leader. In 1923, President Warren G. Harding appointed him United States Attorney for the Northern District of New York. Calvin Coolidge and Herbert Hoover re-appointed him to the office, and he served until 1936. As United States Attorney, he was involved in a number of cases connected with enforcing Prohibition and income tax evasion.

Burden was a member of the American Bar Association, the New York State Bar Association, the Onondaga County Bar Association, and the Commercial Law League.

== Personal life ==
In 1905, Burden married Irene de Tamble. His children were Mrs. S. R. Brentnall and Oliver D. Jr. He was a member of Delta Chi, the Sigma Tau fraternity, the Freemasons, the Shriners, the Knights of Pythias, and the Odd Fellows.

Burden died in Syracuse on November 10, 1947. He was buried in Evergreen Cemetery in Cazenovia.

Legal offices
Preceded by Benjamin C. Mead	United States Attorney for the Northern District of New York; 1923–1936	Succeeded by Ralph L. Emmons
