= Charles H. Brown (New York judge) =

American judge

Charles Brown

Justice of the New York Supreme Court
- In office 1907–1928

United States Attorney for the Western District of New York
- In office 1900–1906
- President: William McKinley; Theodore Roosevelt
- Preceded by: Position created
- Succeeded by: Lyman M. Bass

United States Attorney for the Northern District of New York
- In office 1899–1900
- Preceded by: Emory P. Close
- Succeeded by: George B. Curtiss

Personal details
- Born: Charles Hiram Brown; July 20, 1858 West Winfield, New York, U.S.
- Died: January 6, 1933 (aged 75)

Charles Hiram Brown (July 20, 1858 – January 6, 1933) was an American lawyer and judge from New York.

== Early life and education ==
Brown was born on July 20, 1858, in West Winfield, New York, the son of merchant-miller Hiram Clark Brown and Alice Ann Stuart. He was a descendant of Mayflower passenger Peter Browne.

Brown attended the West Winfield Academy. He was apprenticed in the printing trade when he was 12, working in the trade until 1875. That year, he went to the Hungerford Collegiate Institute in Adams. He graduated from there in 1877. He also taught in school for one term. In 1878, he began studying law in the office of Mills, Palmer & Morgan in Little Falls. He was admitted to the state bar in 1880, and in 1881 he opened a law office in Richburg.

== Career ==
Brown was an active member of the Republican Party, serving as Chairman of the Republican County Committee. He was town supervisor of Bolivar in 1888 and 1889. In 1889, he was elected District Attorney of Allegany County. He was re-elected to the office in 1892 and 1895. In 1891, he moved to Belmont, then one of the two county seats, and managed to have Belmont declared the sole county seat.

Brown was assistant United States attorney for the Northern District of New York from 1897 to 1898. He then served as United States attorney, first for the Northern District of New York then for the Western District of New York. He served as a justice on the New York Supreme Court from 1907 to 1928.

== Personal life ==
Brown was warden of his local Episcopal Church. He was a member of the Freemasons, the Royal Arch Masonry, the Knights Templar, and the Shriners. In 1881, he married Alice C. Smith of Adams. They had two children, Charles H. Jr. and Harold Stuart. Harold worked as a lawyer in Buffalo as part of the law firm Locke, Babcock, Hollister & Brown.

Brown died at his home on January 6, 1933. He was buried in Forest Hills Cemetery.

Legal offices
Preceded by Emory P. Close	U.S. Attorney for the Northern District of New York; 1899–1900	Succeeded by George B. Curtiss
Preceded by Office Created	U.S. Attorney for the Western District of New York; 1900–1906	Succeeded by Lyman M. Bass
