= Emory P. Close =

American politician

Emory P. Close (December 13, 1859 – February 23, 1902) was an American lawyer from New York.

== Life ==
Close was born on December 13, 1859, in Buffalo, New York, the son of lake captain Emory A. Close.

Close worked as an assistant librarian in the Buffalo Library from 1874 to 1877. He studied stenography while working there, and at the age of 17 he left the library and began working in the office of Slocum & Thornton, the official stenographers of the New York Supreme Court, 8th Judicial District. He then spent some time with phrenologist Orson Squire Fowler during the latter's tour through the country reporting on his findings. Upon Close's return to Buffalo at the age of 21, he was appointed official stenographer of the Erie County Court. He then formed a partnership with George Macnoe, the reporter for the Superior Court, and became a member of the stenographic firm Thornton, Briggs & Close.

Close was the stenographer of the New York Supreme Court, 8th Judicial District, from 1880 to 1888. He was appointed official stenographer of the New York State Assembly in 1884, 1885, 1886, and 1887. He started studying law by that point, and in 1886 he was admitted to the bar. He began practicing law in Buffalo in 1888. He initially practiced in the law firm Close & Fleischmann, but later formed a partnership with William L. Marcy called Marcy & Close.

Close was an active member of the Republican Party. In the 1884 presidential election, he was appointed stenographer of the New York Republican State Committee and in charge of selecting and assigning campaign speakers in Western New York. In 1896, he was president of the Republican League of Buffalo, and when the League visited presidential candidate William McKinley a few days before the presidential election, he made an address. In July 1897, McKinley appointed him United States Attorney for the Northern District of New York.

Close attended the First Presbyterian Church. He was a member of the Freemasons, the Odd Fellows and the Ancient Order of United Workmen. In 1885, he married Etta S. Cobb. They had two children, Shirley Belle and Lorenzo Cobb.

Close died on February 23, 1902. He was buried in Forest Lawn Cemetery in Buffalo.

Legal offices
| Preceded by William A. Poucher | U.S. Attorney for the Northern District of New York; 1897–1899 | Succeeded by Charles H. Brown |
