= Richard S. Hartunian =

United States Attorney

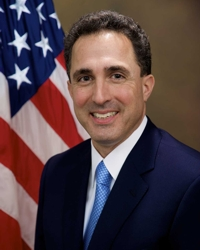
- Official portrait, 2010

United States Attorney for the Northern District of New York
- In office January 3, 2010 – June 30, 2017
- President: Barack Obama; Donald Trump
- Preceded by: Andrew T. Baxter (acting)
- Succeeded by: Grant C. Jaquith

Personal details
- Born: January 13, 1961 (age 65) Evanston, Illinois
- Party: Democratic
- Education: Georgetown University; Albany Law School J.D.

Richard S. Hartunian (born January 13, 1961) is an American attorney who served as the United States Attorney for the Northern District of New York from 2010 to 2017.

== Resignation ==
Hartunian submitted his resignation when it was requested on March 10, 2017, but Hartunian's resignation was declined; he would continue serving in office until June 2017, thereby completing 20 years of service with the Justice Department. He was one of two U.S. Attorneys granted this extension.

Hartunian officially resigned on June 30, 2017.

== See also ==
- 2017 dismissal of U.S. attorneys
