= United States Attorney for the Northern District of New York =

Federal Law enforcement officer in Upstate New York

U.S. Attorney's Office for the Northern District of New York
Agency overview
- Jurisdiction: Northern District of New York
- Parent department: United States Department of Justice
- Website: https://www.justice.gov/usao-ndny

United States Northern District of New York counties.

The United States attorney for the Northern District of New York is the chief federal law enforcement officer in 32 counties in the northern part of the State of New York. The position is currently vacant.

The United States District Court for the Northern District of New York has jurisdiction over all cases prosecuted by the U.S. Attorney. Its jurisdiction comprises the counties of Albany, Broome, Cayuga, Chenango, Clinton, Columbia, Cortland, Delaware, Essex, Franklin, Fulton, Greene, Hamilton, Herkimer, Jefferson, Lewis, Madison, Montgomery, Oneida, Onondaga, Oswego, Otsego, Rensselaer, Saratoga, Schenectady, Schoharie, St. Lawrence, Tioga, Tompkins, Ulster, Warren, and Washington.

The court has offices in Albany, Binghamton, Plattsburgh, Syracuse and Utica. The court also holds court at facilities in Watertown.

== History ==
The original District of New York, established in 1789, was divided in 1814 into the Southern and the Northern District. In 1900, the Western District, comprising 17 counties, was separated from the Northern District.

=== Second Trump administration ===
In the second Trump administration, John A. Sarcone III was sworn in for a 120-day term on March 17, 2025, by Attorney General Pamela Bondi per 28 U.S.C. § 546. As that term was about to expire, on July 14, 2025, Bondi appointed Sarcone as "special attorney to the attorney general" and then as first assistant United States attorney for the Northern District of New York. Per the Federal Vacancies Reform Act of 1998, he then was designated as the acting U.S. attorney for a period of 210 days, though the letter from the Executive Office for United States Attorneys claimed the term was indefinite. Sarcone has not been nominated by the President as U.S. attorney, and said he expected his designation to be temporary as he expected to be appointed as a judge downstate. The Board of Judges of the District Court had the power to appoint Sarcone or another person as U.S. Attorney until someone was appointed by the President after nomination and Senate confirmation, but the Board of Judges declined to exercise that appointment power, described in a New York Times article as a "rare move". Special attorneys have normally been named to lead a particular prosecution, and have seemingly never been used for someone acting as a U.S. attorney, with University of Richmond School of Law professor Carl Tobias saying he'd "never heard of that being done" and "It seems like they're making this up as they go along."

On February 12, 2026, the Northern District of New York appointed Donald T. Kinsella as U.S. attorney. The same day, the Department of Justice dismissed Kinsella as U.S. attorney.

== List of U.S. attorneys for the Northern District of New York ==
- Roger Skinner: 1815 – 1819
- Jacob Sutherland: 1819 – 1823
- Samuel Beardsley: 1823 – 1831
- Nathaniel S. Benton: 1831 – 1841
- Joshua A. Spencer: 1841 – 1845
- William F. Allen: 1845 – 1847
- George W. Clinton: 1847 – 1850
- James R. Lawrence: 1850 – 1853
- Henry A. Foster: 1853 (nominated and confirmed, but declined to take office)
- John B. Skinner: 1853 (nominated and confirmed, but declined to take office)
- Samuel B. Garvin: 1853 – 1857
- James Clark Spencer: 1857 – 1861
- William A. Dart: 1861 – 1866
- George G. Munger 1866 – 1867
- William Dorsheimer: 1867 – 1871
- Richard Crowley: 1871 – 1879
- Martin I. Townsend: 1879 – 1886
- Daniel N. Lockwood: 1886 – 1889
- De Alva S. Alexander: 1889 – 1893
- William A. Poucher: 1893 – 1897
- Emory P. Close: 1897 – 1899
- Charles H. Brown: 1899 – 1900
- George B. Curtiss: 1900 – 1913
- John H. Gleason: 1913 – 1916
- Dennis B. Lucey: 1916 – 1921
- Clarence E. Williams: 1921
- Hiram C. Todd: 1921 – 1922
- Earle Gallufo: 1922
- Benjamin C. Mead: 1922 – 1923
- Oliver D. Burden: 1923 – 1936
- Ralph L. Emmons: 1936 – 1943
- Irving J. Higbee: 1943 – 1951
- Edmund Port: 1951 – 1953
- Anthony F. Caffrey: 1953
- Theodore F. Bowes: 1953 – 1961
- Justin J. Mahoney: 1961 – 1969
- James M. Sullivan, Jr.: 1969
- Samuel T. Betts III: 1969 – 1973
- James M. Sullivan, Jr.: 1973 – 1976
- Paul V. French: 1976 – 1978
- George H. Lowe: 1978 – 1982
- Gustave J. DiBianco: 1982
- Frederick J. Scullin, Jr.: 1982 – 1992
- Gary L. Sharpe: 1992 – 1994
- Thomas J. Maroney: 1994 – 1999
- Daniel J. French: 1999 – 2001
- Joseph A. Pavone (Acting) 2001 – 2002
- Glenn T. Suddaby: October 25, 2002 – September 5, 2008
- Andrew T. Baxter (Acting): 2008 – 2010
- Richard S. Hartunian: February 19, 2010 – June 30, 2017
- Grant C. Jaquith: June 30, 2017 – September 3, 2020
- Antoinette T. Bacon (Acting): September 3, 2020 – October 8, 2021
- Carla B. Freedman: October 8, 2021 – February 17, 2025
- Daniel Hanlon (Acting): February 17, 2025 – March 17, 2025
- John A. Sarcone III (Acting): March 17, 2025 – January 8, 2026 (appointment found unlawful by court)
- Donald Kinsella: Midday of February 12, 2026 — Evening of February 12, 2026
