= Joanna Stern =

American technology journalist (born 1984)

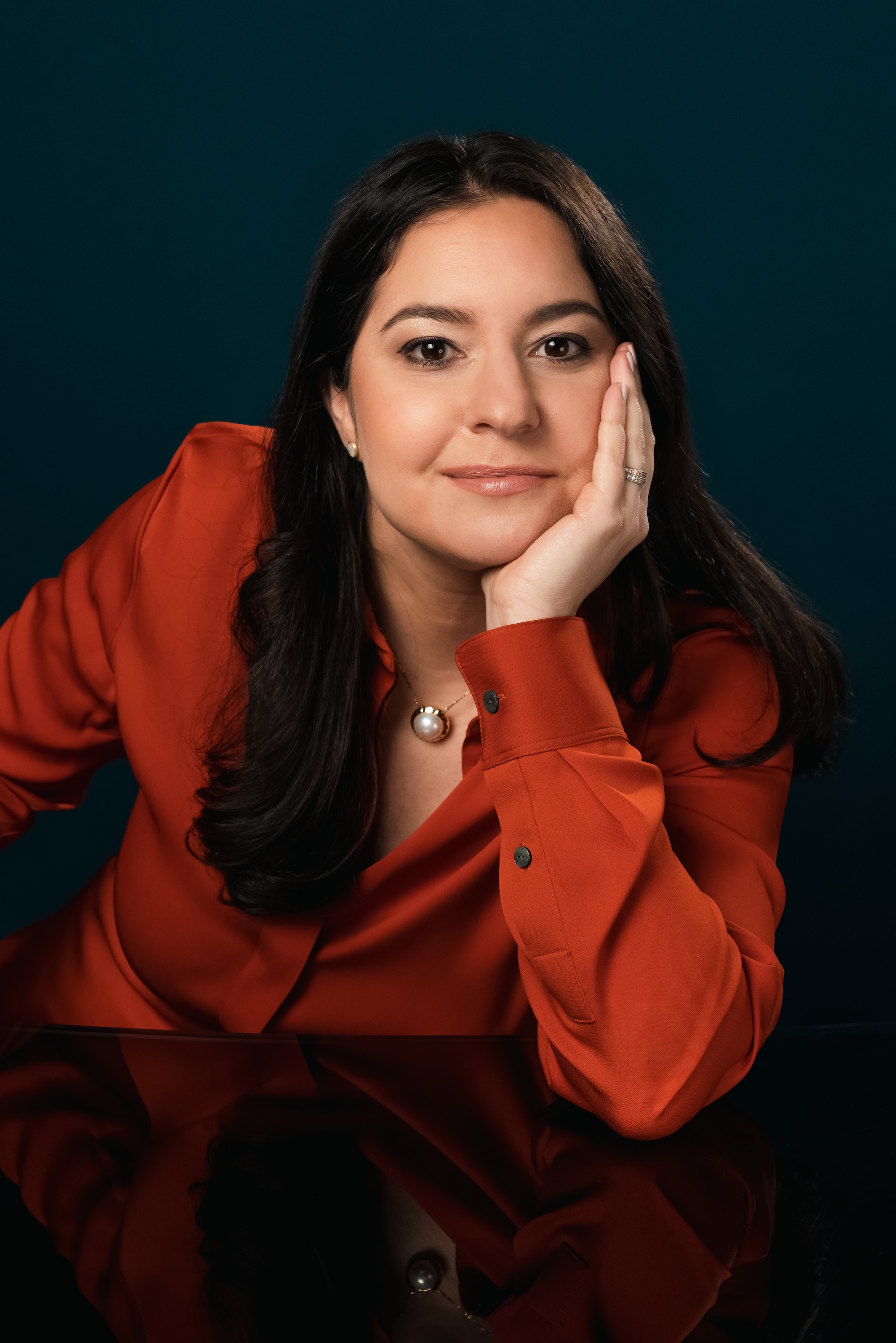
- Stern in 2022
- Born: Joanna Ruth Stern; December 5, 1984 (age 41)
- Education: Union College (BA)
- Years active: 2006–present
- Spouse: Michelle Katharine Barna (m. 2014)

Joanna Stern (born December 5, 1984) is an American technology journalist known for her videos and columns at The Wall Street Journal and technology news websites Engadget and The Verge. She became a personal technology columnist at The Wall Street Journal in 2014, as part of the team that replaced Walt Mossberg. She left the Journal in 2026 and launched The New Things, a tech journalism company that produces newsletters and YouTube videos. She also has a partnership with NBC News, which publishes and broadcasts her work from The New Things.

== Education ==
Stern graduated from Union College in 2006, where she studied political science and journalism. She served as the editor in chief of the Concordiensis, Union's student newspaper.

== Career ==
Stern began her technology writing career at Laptop Magazine, where she reviewed laptops and netbooks. She then spent three years at Engadget, as reviews editor, writing various consumer technology reviews. In March 2011, she left Engadget with Joshua Topolsky, Nilay Patel, Paul Miller, Chris Ziegler and other co-workers to create This Is My Next, which would later become The Verge.

In February 2012, Stern joined ABC News as a technology editor, hosting her own video series and appearing on the TV network's various shows as a technology expert. In December 2013, she and Geoffrey A. Fowler were named personal technology columnists at The Wall Street Journal.

In 2016, Stern received a Gerald Loeb Award for her Wall Street Journal videos, including her video review of the Apple Watch (which includes a cameo appearance by Rupert Murdoch) and another where she "rode" on a router that had a shape like a spaceship. She is also a CNBC contributor, often appearing on Tech Check. In September 2021, she won a News & Documentary Emmy Award for her Wall Street Journal documentary on death and technology. Stern received a second Gerald Loeb Award in 2022 for an article on TikTok.

== I Am Not a Robot ==
Stern is the author of I Am Not a Robot, published in 2026, an account of her use of AI and robots for one year. She used AI programs and hardware for health advice, housecleaning, driving and mental health therapy. She also had an AI boyfriend. “It’s the reality already starting to arrive for all of us,” she wrote in the book. “I just happened to live it first.”

The book was praised in The New Yorker by Joshua Rothman, who wrote that Stern "is exactly the sort of writer you want to read on the question of how useful A.I. can be in real life. She’s made a career out of being a normal person who knows a lot about technology but never gets carried away by sci-fi fantasies."

Publishers Weekly said "Stern’s balanced, clear-eyed assessments and crisp, funny prose make this stand out among the growing crowd of books on AI."

== Personal life ==
Stern was born to Susan Stern and Daniel Stern, the former the owner of a lecture agency.

In February 2009, Stern met her wife on Twitter and the couple married in 2014. They live in Jersey City with their children. She has written an article that jokingly names their dog as a co-author. Stern is Jewish.
