= Benjamin C. Mead =

American lawyer

Benjamin Charles Mead (February 17, 1873 – July 3, 1934) was an American lawyer from New York.

== Life ==
Mead was born on February 17, 1873, in Fleming, New York, the son of J. Warren Mead, sheriff of Cayuga County and warden of the Auburn State Prison, and Eliza Clark. His grandfather James Mead also served as sheriff of the county.

Mead graduated from the Auburn High School in 1891. He then went to Harvard College, graduating from there with an A.B. in 1896. In 1901, he graduated from Harvard Law School with an LL.B. He was admitted to the bar later that year and began practicing law in Auburn.

In 1902, Mead enlisted as a private in Company M, Third New York Infantry, New York National Guard. He gradually rose through the ranks, serving on the Mexican border in 1916 to 1917 as a captain of the company. In April 1917, after America entered World War I, he was initially stationed in the Fort Niagara training camp in New York. In August 1917, he was mobilized with the N. Y. Division and sent to Camp Wadsworth in South Carolina. In October 1917, he was transferred to Company M., 74th New York Infantry, New York National Guard. In January 1918, the regiment was renamed the 55th Pioneer Infantry. In May 1918, he was appointed Personnel Adjutant of the regiment. In September 1918, he was sent to France, where he served as Summary Court Officer of the Classification Camp in Le Mans. In January 1919, he returned to the United States, where he was a patient at the General Hospital in Fort Ontario, New York. He was suffering from a leaky heart, pneumonia, the flu, and other ailments. He was still a patient at the hospital when he was discharged in July 1919.

Mead served as Assistant United States Attorney for the Northern District of New York from 1921 to 1926. He also served at one point as the Acting United States Attorney for the district. He was also a major in the Judge Advocates Department, Reserve Corps, United States Army.

Mead was a Republican. He was a deacon of the Auburn First Baptist Church. He was a member of the Freemasons, the Order of the Founders and Patriots of America, the Cayuga County Farm Bureau, and the Disabled Emergency Officers Association of the World War. He was vice-commander of his American Legion post and president of the Cayuga County Bar Association. He was also a member of the Cayuga County Historical Society, the New York State Bar Association, and the Kiwanis Club. In 1905, he married Adelaide Bourne. Their children were Elizabeth Bourne, Florence Anderson, Benjamin Charles Jr., Emma Adelaide, Warren Frederick, and Margaret Wayland.

Mead died in Auburn City Hospital on July 3, 1934. He was buried in Fort Hill Cemetery in Auburn.

Legal offices
Preceded by Earle Gallufo	U.S. Attorney for the Northern District of New York; 1922–1923	Succeeded by Oliver D. Burden
