= Anthony F. Caffrey =

US attorney

Anthony Francis Caffrey (25 Aug 1908 in Syracuse, New York – 17 Oct 1968 in Syracuse, New York) served as US attorney and assistant US attorney prior to his appointment as Syracuse postmaster on Sept. 9, 1964.

The Syracuse, NY resident attended Sumner and Edward Smith Schools and Christian Brothers Academy. In 1929 he received his law degree from Syracuse University at the age of 21. He was associated with the firms of Page, Lay & Baker, and Ralph Shulman, before opening his own law practice in 1940 as a member of the firm Maxwell, Francis & Caffrey.

In 1943 he entered the Army as a private and was honorably discharged as a captain in 1946 after having served with an anti-aircraft unit, foreign claims service, and Judge Advocate General’s office.

A member of the Democratic Party, Caffrey secured the endorsement of the Syracuse Post-Standard when he ran for district attorney in 1957, after he had served as an assistant US attorney in 1952.

In 1953 he was appointed interim US attorney for the Northern New York Judicial District. He had been a former assistant US attorney in 1932.

He served as secretary of the Democratic County Committee, and as Democratic campaign manager in the 1960 presidential election.

He was given a provisional appointment as postmaster in 1963 and was formally nominated by President Lyndon B. Johnson in 1964.

Considered to be an efficient postmaster, he was honored on several occasions for improved postal service in the Syracuse office. In 1964 he was saluted by the Syracuse Mail Users Council and postal employee representatives at a testimonial dinner, when Louis Nizer, the famous attorney, was the speaker.

He was instrumental in obtaining more than 300 summer jobs in 1968 for disadvantaged young people. It was the first time the Syracuse Post Office offered such a program.

Mr. Caffrey was a communicant of St. Anthony of Padua Church, a member of the Post 41 American Legion, the Citizen’s Club, of which he served as director, the Knights of Columbus, and was an Intelligence officer in the 108th Infantry of the New York National Guard. He was also a member of the Onondaga and State Bar Association and was president and director of the Legion Bowling Center. He was a member of the Holy Name Society and Couples Club of St. Anthony de Padua Church, the Liederkranz Club, the Anti-Sourpuss Society, the CBA Alumni Association, the Syracuse University Alumni Association, the National Association of Horsemasters, the County Board of Examining Plumbers and the County Public Works Advisory Board.
