= Grant C. Jaquith =

American judge

Grant Jaquith
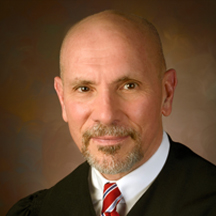

Judge of the United States Court of Appeals for Veterans Claims
- Incumbent
- Assumed office September 1, 2020
- Appointed by: Donald Trump
- Preceded by: Robert N. Davis

United States Attorney for the Northern District of New York
- In office July 1, 2017 – September 2, 2020; Acting: July 1, 2017 – January 5, 2018
- President: Donald Trump
- Preceded by: Richard S. Hartunian
- Succeeded by: Carla B. Freedman

Personal details
- Born: Grant Colton Jaquith
- Education: Presbyterian College (BS); University of Florida (JD)

Military service
- Allegiance: United States
- Branch/service: United States Army
- Years of service: 1982–2011
- Rank: Colonel
- Unit: Army Judge Advocate General's Corps
- Awards: Legion of Merit

Grant Colton Jaquith is an American lawyer who serves as a judge of the United States Court of Appeals for Veterans Claims. He served as the United States attorney for the Northern District of New York from 2018 to 2020.

== Education ==
Jaquith earned his Bachelor of Science, cum laude, from Presbyterian College and his Juris Doctor from the Fredric G. Levin College of Law.

== Legal career ==
Jaquith served as an Assistant United States Attorney for the Northern District of New York, including as First Assistant United States Attorney, Chief of the Criminal Division, Narcotics Chief, and Chief of the Albany Office. Jaquith attended The JAG School at the University of Virginia and entered U.S. Army JAG Corps. He served in the J.A.G. Corps from 1982 to 2011. He served as Staff Judge Advocate, Circuit Judge, and Chief of Military Law, rising to the rank of Colonel.

Before joining the U.S. Attorney's Office, Jaquith was in the litigation department of the law firm of Bond Schoeneck & King in Syracuse (1988–89) and a Judge Advocate on active duty in the U.S. Army (1982–88), where his work included administrative law, labor law, settlement of civil claims, legal assistance to soldiers, retirees, and their families, and criminal prosecutions. In 1984, he also taught Juvenile Law and Federal Income Taxation at Drury College. In 1982, he interned at the Public Defender's Office in Gainesville, Florida.

== Federal judicial service ==
On August 28, 2019, President Trump announced his intent to nominate Jaquith to serve as a judge of the United States Court of Appeals for Veterans Claims. On September 19, 2019, his nomination was sent to the Senate. President Trump nominated Jaquith to the seat vacated by Judge Robert N. Davis when his term expired on December 4, 2019. On November 6, 2019, a hearing on his nomination was held before the Committee on Veterans' Affairs. On January 29, 2020, his nomination was reported favorably out of committee. On July 23, 2020, the full United States Senate confirmed his nomination by voice vote. He received his judicial commission on September 1, 2020.

Legal offices
Preceded by Richard S. Hartunian	United States Attorney for the Northern District of New York; 2017–2020; Acting: 2017–2018	Succeeded by Carla B. Freedman
Preceded by Robert N. Davis	Judge of the United States Court of Appeals for Veterans Claims; 2020–present	Incumbent
