= Concordiensis =

Student-run newspaper of Union College

- "The Student Newspaper of Union College since 1877"
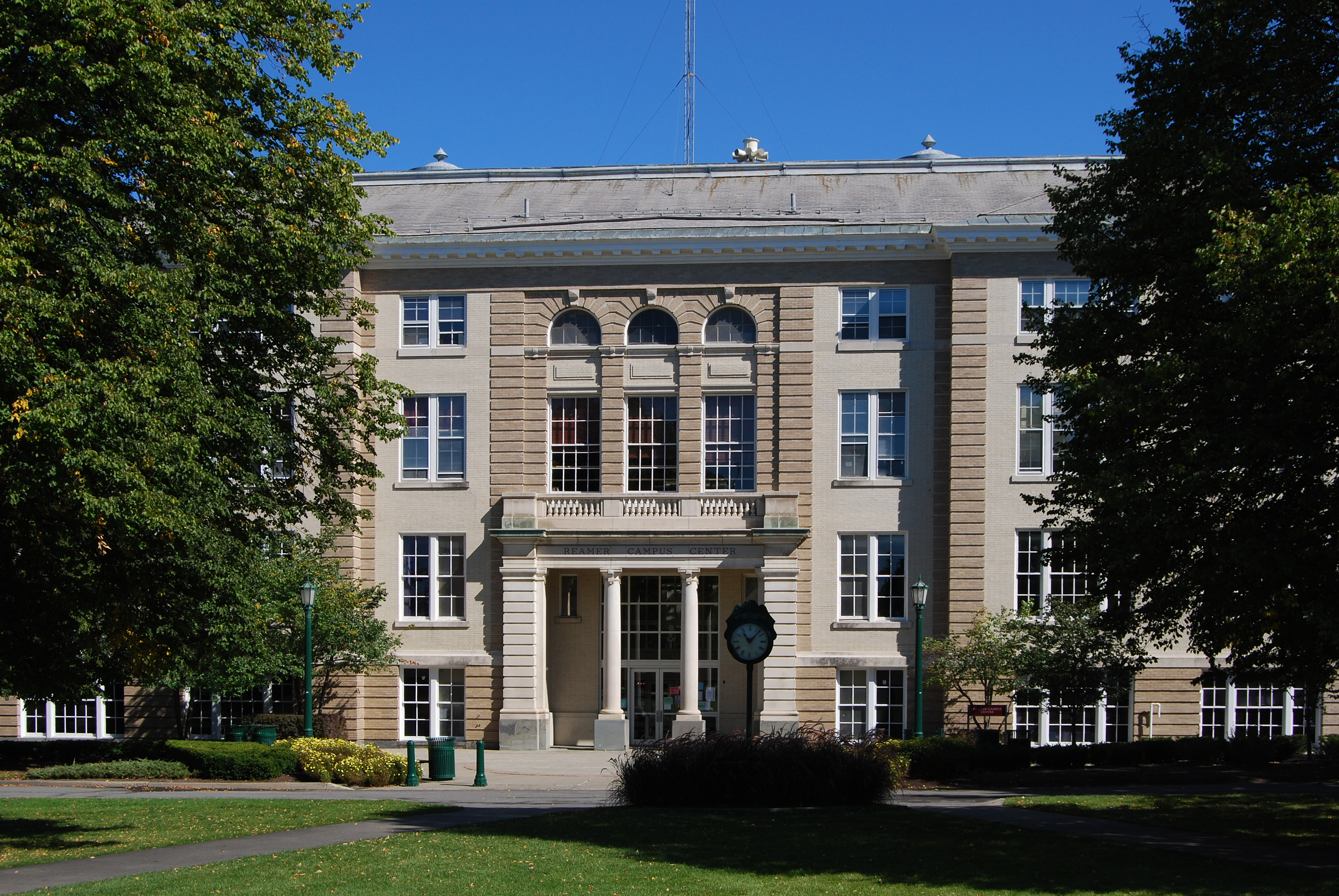
- Reamer Campus Center, which houses the office of the Concordiensis
- Type: Bi-weekly student newspaper
- Format: Tabloid
- School: Union College
- Publisher: The students of Union College
- Editor: Matthew Lowry ‘27
- Founded: 1877
- Headquarters: Box 2577, Union College, 807 Union St., Schenectady, NY 12308
- City: Schenectady, New York
- Website: concordiensis.com

Concordiensis is the student-run newspaper of Union College in Schenectady, New York, United States. It was founded in November 1877 and is the thirteenth oldest student newspaper in the United States and is the oldest continuously published newspaper in the city of Schenectady. The newspaper's title, meaning "of or pertaining to union," was most likely suggested by Frederic F. Chisholm class of 1879 and has been in use since 1890. Since then, it has been informally called "the Concordy."

== Founding history ==
The Concordiensis is the third student publication in Union College History. It was preceded by the College Spectator (1872–75) and the Union College Magazine (a literary magazine in 1875).

== Production history ==
Over its long history, Concordiensis has gone through numerous changes in format and frequency of publication.

Format: 8 inches by 11 inches

- 1877-1889: Monthly
- 1890-1896: Bi-weekly
- Centennial Commencement Week, 1895: Daily
- 1896-1916: Weekly

Format: 4-column tabloid

- 1916-1918: Three times a week
- Sep. 1918- Jan. 1919: None, World War I
- 1919-1927: Two times a week

Format: 6-columns wide, 17-inches high

- 1927-1928: Two times a week

Format: 5-columns wide, 15-inches high

- 1928-Feb 1942: Two times a week

Reduced Format

- 1943-End of World War II: Weekly
- Summer 1943, World War II Summer Session

Format: 4-pages

- Post-WWII: Weekly

Format: 6-8 pages, horizontal make-up

- 1948-1968: Weekly

Format: 16 pages, tabloid

- 2009-2011: Weekly
- 2014–Present

Format: 20 pages, tabloid

- 2011–2014: Weekly

Format: 8 pages, tabloid

- 2024: Every other week

== National exposure ==
=== John Sweeney, 2006 ===
The Concordiensis garnered national attention in April 2006 when it ran a front page story on former Republican Congressman (NY) John Sweeney's late-night appearance at a fraternity party on campus. The Concordy based its report on eyewitness testimonies from students. The students claimed Sweeney had acted openly intoxicated and behaved inappropriately, making hostile remarks towards one female about her political affiliations. Cell phone photographs also surfaced after the incident and were included in the Concordy's coverage.

Co-editors-in-chief Matt Smith and Alla Abramov made the decision to run the story based on a lack of denial from Sweeney's camp. With the help of former editor-in-chief Joanna Stern, Smith and Abramov faxed copies to local Albany newspapers. That weekend, the story was picked up by major newswires and ran across the country.

The New York Times gave the story full coverage and ran the cell phone photos that had appeared in the Concordiensis.

=== Delta Delta Delta, 2011 ===
In October 2011, the Concordiensis ran several pieces concerning a campus investigation into a Delta Delta Delta sorority party. Copies of one issue were stolen en masse from distribution boxes and thrown in the trash. The story was picked up by the Student Press Law Center and by College Media Matters, organizations that track national college press issues.

== Notable alumni ==
- Joanna Stern

== Bibliography ==
- Somers, Wayne, ed (2003). Encyclopedia of Union College History. Schenectady, New York: Union College. ISBN 0-912756-31-4.
