= Gary R. Brown =

American judge (born 1963)

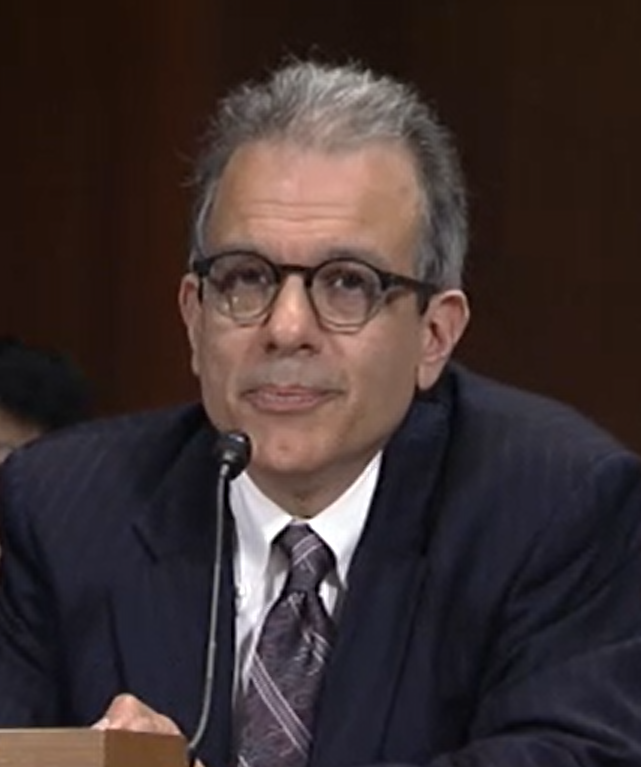

Judge of the United States District Court for the Eastern District of New York
- Incumbent
- Assumed office December 31, 2019
- Appointed by: Donald Trump
- Preceded by: Sandra J. Feuerstein

Magistrate Judge of the United States District Court for the Eastern District of New York
- In office November 2011 – December 31, 2019

Personal details
- Born: Gary Richard Brown; 1963 (age 62–63) Brooklyn, New York, U.S.
- Education: Columbia University (BA); Yale University (JD)

Gary Richard Brown (born 1963) is a United States district judge of the United States District Court for the Eastern District of New York and former United States magistrate judge of the same court.

== Biography ==
Brown received his Bachelor of Arts, cum laude, from Columbia College in 1985 and his Juris Doctor from Yale Law School in 1988. Brown began his legal career as a law clerk to Judge Jacob Mishler of the United States District Court for the Eastern District of New York from 1988 to 1989.

From 1989 to 1996, Brown served as an assistant United States attorney in the Civil Division, where he also served as affirmative litigation coordinator from 1994 to 1996. From 1996 to 2005, he served as an assistant United States attorney in the Long Island Criminal Division at the United States Attorney's Office for the Eastern District of New York, where he was elevated to deputy chief in 2001 and chief in 2003. From 2005 to 2011, Brown worked at CA Technologies as senior counsel, associate general counsel, and director for litigation, and then as chief compliance officer and chief counsel of litigation.

== Federal judicial service ==
=== United States magistrate judge ===
Brown served as United States magistrate judge of the United States District Court for the Eastern District of New York from 2011 to 2019.

=== Expired nomination to district court under Obama ===
On July 30, 2015, President Barack Obama nominated Brown to serve as a United States District Judge of the United States District Court for the Eastern District of New York, to the seat vacated by Judge Sandra J. Feuerstein, who assumed senior status on January 21, 2015. He received a hearing before the United States Senate Judiciary Committee on October 21, 2015. On November 5, 2015, his nomination was reported out of committee by a voice vote. His nomination expired on January 3, 2017, at the end of the 114th Congress.

=== Renomination to district court under Trump ===
In August 2017, Brown was one of several candidates pitched by the White House to U.S. Senators from New York Chuck Schumer and Kirsten Gillibrand for judicial candidates for vacancies on the federal courts in New York. On May 10, 2018, President Donald Trump announced his intent to nominate Brown to serve as a United States district judge for the United States District Court for the Eastern District of New York. His nomination was part of a bipartisan package of judicial nominees which included Eric Komitee, Rachel Kovner, John Sinatra, and Mary Kay Vyskocil. On May 15, 2018, his nomination was sent to the Senate. He was renominated to the same seat. On September 13, 2018, his nomination was reported out of committee by a 21–0 vote.

On January 3, 2019, his nomination was returned to the President under Rule XXXI, Paragraph 6 of the United States Senate. On April 8, 2019, President Trump announced the renomination of Brown to the district court. On May 21, 2019, his nomination was sent to the Senate. On June 20, 2019, his nomination was reported out of committee by a voice vote. On December 18, 2019, the Senate invoked cloture on his nomination by a 91–2 vote. On December 19, 2019, his nomination was confirmed by a voice vote. He received his judicial commission on December 31, 2019.

=== Notable cases ===
In December 2025, Brown ordered ICE to provide photos of a holding cell, which was described as "putrid and cramped". Brown slammed ICE for refusing to comply with his order and turn over photos. Brown also found over falsehoods in ICE's reports, such as its claims that a defendant was moved between facilities that are more than 20 miles apart and require “a drive of 35 minutes or more" in just 8 minutes.

== Other interests ==
Brown has had a long time interest in magic, which he began performing at the age of seven. Besides many contributions to magic periodicals and websites, he authored the book The Coney Island Fakir (1997), a biography about magician Al Flosso; and Wandcraft: Making and Using a Magic Wand (2020). He has appeared on television as a commentator on magic numerous times, and has frequently delivered lectures for magic organizations. In 2020 he received the "Heroism and Patriot Award" from the Society of American Magicians.

Brown has also invented several magical effects, including the Viking "Spirit Trumpet" and "Telekinetic Chess" illusions. Judge Brown was recently on The CW network show, Penn & Teller Fool Us, aired 3-31-2023. A Fool Us Trophy however was not awarded.

== See also ==
- Barack Obama judicial appointment controversies

Legal offices
Preceded by Sandra J. Feuerstein	Judge of the United States District Court for the Eastern District of New York; 2019–present	Incumbent
