= I. Leo Glasser =

American judge (born 1924)

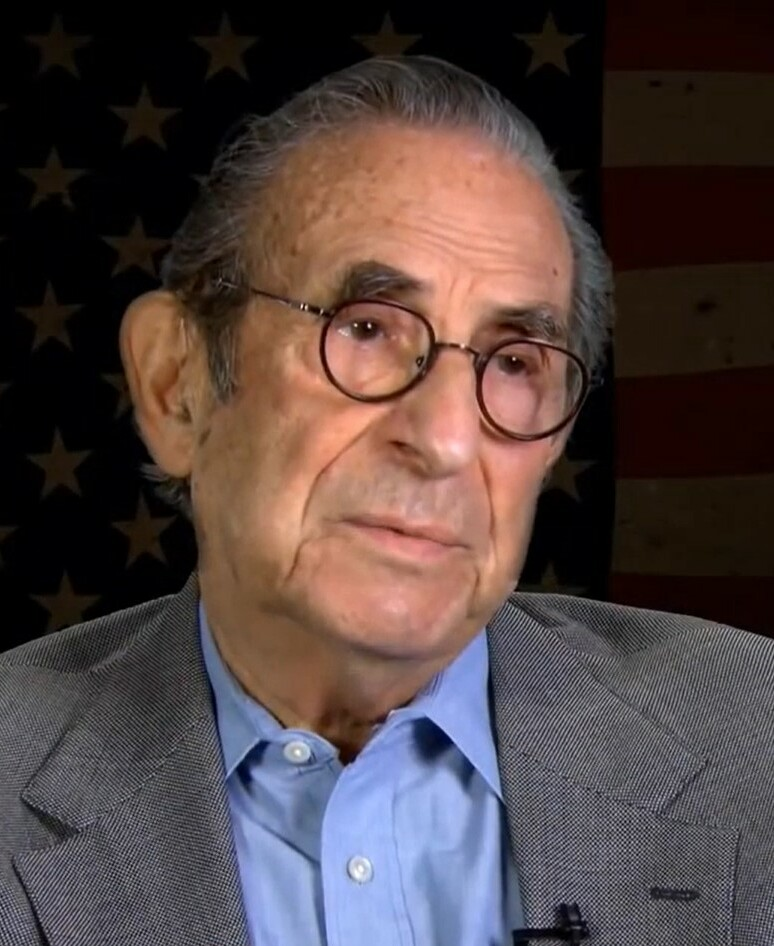
- Glasser in 2014

Senior Judge of the United States District Court for the Eastern District of New York
- Incumbent
- Assumed office July 1, 1993

Judge of the United States District Court for the Eastern District of New York
- In office December 10, 1981 – July 1, 1993
- Appointed by: Ronald Reagan
- Preceded by: Jacob Mishler
- Succeeded by: Allyne R. Ross

Personal details
- Born: Israel Leo Glasser; April 6, 1924 (age 102) New York City, U.S.
- Education: City College of New York (BA); Brooklyn Law School (LLB)

Israel Leo Glasser (born April 6, 1924), also known as I. Leo Glasser or Leo Glasser, is a senior United States district judge of the United States District Court for the Eastern District of New York.

== Education and career ==
Glasser was born to a Jewish family in New York City on April 6, 1924. His father, who spoke Yiddish, ran a butcher shop. He graduated from the City College of New York in 1943 and then served in the United States Army in Europe during World War II. He was awarded the Bronze Star for bravery during his service in the European theater. Upon returning from the war, Glasser obtained a law degree from Brooklyn Law School in 1948, and then immediately began teaching at the school. He served on the faculty until 1969, when he was appointed a judge of the New York Family Court. For years, Glasser lectured to thousands of law students preparing for the New York Bar Exam on virtually all subjects covered on the bar exam.

Glasser returned to Brooklyn Law School in 1977 to serve as its dean, a position he held until 1981 when he was nominated for the federal bench.

=== Federal judicial service ===
Glasser was nominated by President Ronald Reagan on November 23, 1981, to a seat on the United States District Court for the Eastern District of New York vacated by Judge Jacob Mishler. He was confirmed by the United States Senate on December 9, 1981, and received commission on December 10, 1981. He assumed senior status on July 1, 1993.

=== Notable cases ===
Glasser has presided over several high-profile trials during his tenure, the most notable of which was the trial of mobster John Gotti. The prosecutor in that case, John Gleeson, would also go on to serve on the Eastern District federal bench. Judge Glasser also presided over an early terrorism trial involving an organization dubbed "The Ohio Five" and presided over a number of other significant organized crime trials and proceedings including the conviction of Vincent Gigante, the head of the Genovese crime family. In 1987 Glasser sentenced Victor Vancier, ex-chairman of the Jewish Defense League, for charges involving a series of bombings in New York beginning in 1984.

== Personal life ==
Glasser turned 100 in April 2024.

Academic offices
Preceded by Raymond Lisle	Dean of Brooklyn Law School; 1977–1981	Succeeded by David G. Trager
Legal offices
Preceded by Jacob Mishler	Judge of the United States District Court for the Eastern District of New York; 1981–1993	Succeeded by Allyne R. Ross
