= Robert Alexander Inch =

American judge (1873–1961)

Senior Judge of the United States District Court for the Eastern District of New York
- In office January 6, 1958 – January 12, 1961

Chief Judge of the United States District Court for the Eastern District of New York
- In office 1948–1958
- Preceded by: Office established
- Succeeded by: Mortimer W. Byers

Judge of the United States District Court for the Eastern District of New York
- In office April 28, 1923 – January 6, 1958
- Appointed by: Warren G. Harding (recess); Calvin Coolidge (commission)
- Preceded by: Thomas Chatfield
- Succeeded by: John R. Bartels

Personal details
- Born: Robert Alexander Inch; April 3, 1873 Providence, Rhode Island
- Died: January 12, 1961 (aged 87) Queens, New York
- Education: Princeton University (A.B.); New York Law School (LL.B.)

Robert Alexander Inch (April 3, 1873 – January 12, 1961) was a United States district judge of the United States District Court for the Eastern District of New York in Brooklyn, New York from 1923 to 1961 and its Chief Judge from 1948 to 1958.

== Education and career ==
Born in Providence, Rhode Island, Inch obtained an Artium Baccalaureus degree from Princeton University in 1895 and then graduated from New York Law School in 1897. After graduation, Inch spent the next 27 years as a lawyer in private practice in New York City, New York.

== Federal judicial service ==
Inch received a recess appointment from President Warren G. Harding on April 28, 1923, to a seat on the United States District Court for the Eastern District of New York vacated by Judge Thomas Chatfield. He was nominated to the same position by President Calvin Coolidge on December 15, 1923. He was confirmed by the United States Senate on January 8, 1924, and received his commission the same day. He served as Chief Judge from 1948 to 1958. He assumed senior status on January 6, 1958. His service terminated on January 12, 1961, due to his death in Queens, New York.

=== Notable cases ===
As a federal district judge, Inch presided over a full array of civil and criminal matters, ranging from prosecutions under the Volstead Act during the Prohibition era to receivership cases during the Great Depression and conspiracy charges against alleged organized crime leaders during the 1950s. From 1948 to 1951, Inch presided over the government's case against Martin James Monti for assisting Germany during World War II, denying Monti's plea to withdraw his guilty plea to charges of treason that initially resulted in a 25-year prison sentence.

=== Criticism ===
Although Inch was reportedly a dedicated and hardworking judge, his decisions were not universally respected. In particular, Judge Learned Hand of the United States Court of Appeals for the Second Circuit, which reviewed Inch's rulings when they were appealed, was consistently critical, frequently referring to Inch in internal court memoranda by derisive names such as "the Inchworm" or "Judge Millimeter."

== Personal ==
Off the bench, Inch was known as a lover of golf, a sport he played avidly for more than 50 years.

== See also ==
- List of United States federal judges by longevity of service

Legal offices
Preceded by Thomas Chatfield	Judge of the United States District Court for the Eastern District of New York; 1923–1958	Succeeded by John R. Bartels
Preceded by Office established	Chief Judge of the United States District Court for the Eastern District of New York; 1948–1958	Succeeded by Mortimer W. Byers
