= Allyne R. Ross =

American judge (born 1946)

Senior Judge of the United States District Court for the Eastern District of New York
- Incumbent
- Assumed office April 5, 2011

Judge of the United States District Court for the Eastern District of New York
- In office September 29, 1994 – April 5, 2011
- Appointed by: Bill Clinton
- Preceded by: I. Leo Glasser
- Succeeded by: Margo Kitsy Brodie

Magistrate Judge of the United States District Court for the Eastern District of New York
- In office 1986–1994

Personal details
- Born: April 5, 1946 (age 80) New York City, New York, U.S.
- Education: Wellesley College (BA); Harvard University (JD)

Allyne Ronna Ross (born April 5, 1946) is a senior United States district judge of the United States District Court for the Eastern District of New York.

== Early life and education ==
Born in New York City, Ross received a Bachelor of Arts from Wellesley College in 1967 and a Juris Doctor from Harvard Law School in 1970. She was a staff attorney to the Boston Legal Assistance Project from 1970 to 1971, and was in private practice of law in New York City from 1971 to 1976. She was an attorney in the United States Attorney's Office, Eastern District of New York, from 1976 to 1986, and was an assistant United States attorney from 1976 to 1983. She was in the Appeals Division from 1983 to 1986. She was a United States magistrate judge of the United States District Court for the Eastern District of New York from 1986 to 1994.

== Federal judicial service ==
On July 22, 1994, Ross was nominated by President Bill Clinton to a seat on the United States District Court for the Eastern District of New York vacated by Judge I. Leo Glasser who assumed senior status on July 1, 1993. Ross was confirmed by the United States Senate on September 28, 1994, and received her commission on September 29, 1994. She assumed senior status on April 5, 2011.

== Personal life ==
At the time of her nomination, she was married to her husband Joel Henry Goldberg. The couple have one child and lived in Scarsdale, New York.

== See also ==
- List of Jewish American jurists

== Sources ==
Legal offices
Preceded by I. Leo Glasser	Judge of the United States District Court for the Eastern District of New York; 1994–2011	Succeeded by Margo Kitsy Brodie
