= Walter Bruchhausen =

American judge (1892–1976)

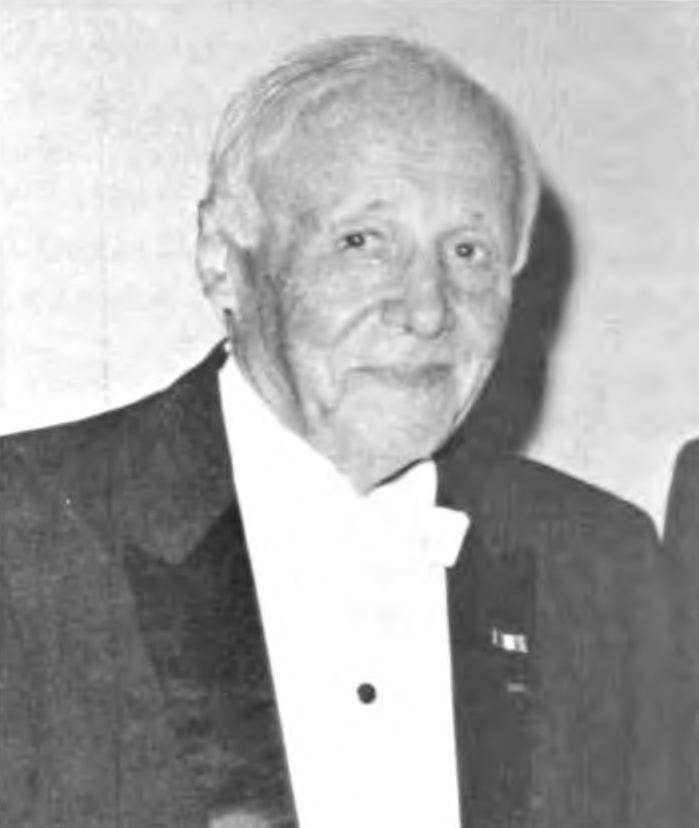

Senior Judge of the United States District Court for the Eastern District of New York
- In office May 20, 1967 – October 11, 1976

Chief Judge of the United States District Court for the Eastern District of New York
- In office 1959–1962
- Preceded by: Mortimer W. Byers
- Succeeded by: Joseph Carmine Zavatt

Judge of the United States District Court for the Eastern District of New York
- In office May 8, 1953 – May 20, 1967
- Appointed by: Dwight D. Eisenhower
- Preceded by: Harold Maurice Kennedy
- Succeeded by: Orrin Grimmell Judd

Personal details
- Born: Walter Bruchhausen; May 29, 1892 Brooklyn, New York
- Died: October 11, 1976 (aged 84)
- Education: New York University School of Law (LL.B.)

Walter Bruchhausen (May 29, 1892 – October 11, 1976) was a United States district judge of the United States District Court for the Eastern District of New York from 1953 to 1976 and its Chief Judge from 1959 to 1962.

== Education and career ==
Born in Brooklyn, New York, Bruchhausen received a Bachelor of Laws from New York University School of Law in 1912, and then entered the United States Military, serving in World War I. He was in private practice of law in New York City from 1919 to 1953, and was also a member of the New York State Judicial Council from 1950 to 1953.

== Federal judicial service ==
Bruchhausen was nominated by President Dwight D. Eisenhower on April 18, 1953, to a seat on the United States District Court for the Eastern District of New York vacated by Judge Harold Maurice Kennedy. He was confirmed by the United States Senate on May 7, 1953, and received his commission the next day. He served as Chief Judge from 1959 to 1962. He assumed senior status on May 20, 1967, and died on October 11, 1976.

== Sources ==
Legal offices
Preceded by Harold Maurice Kennedy	Judge of the United States District Court for the Eastern District of New York; 1953–1967	Succeeded by Orrin Grimmell Judd
Preceded by Mortimer W. Byers	Chief Judge of the United States District Court for the Eastern District of New York; 1959–1962	Succeeded by Joseph Carmine Zavatt
