= Jack B. Weinstein =

American judge (1921–2021)

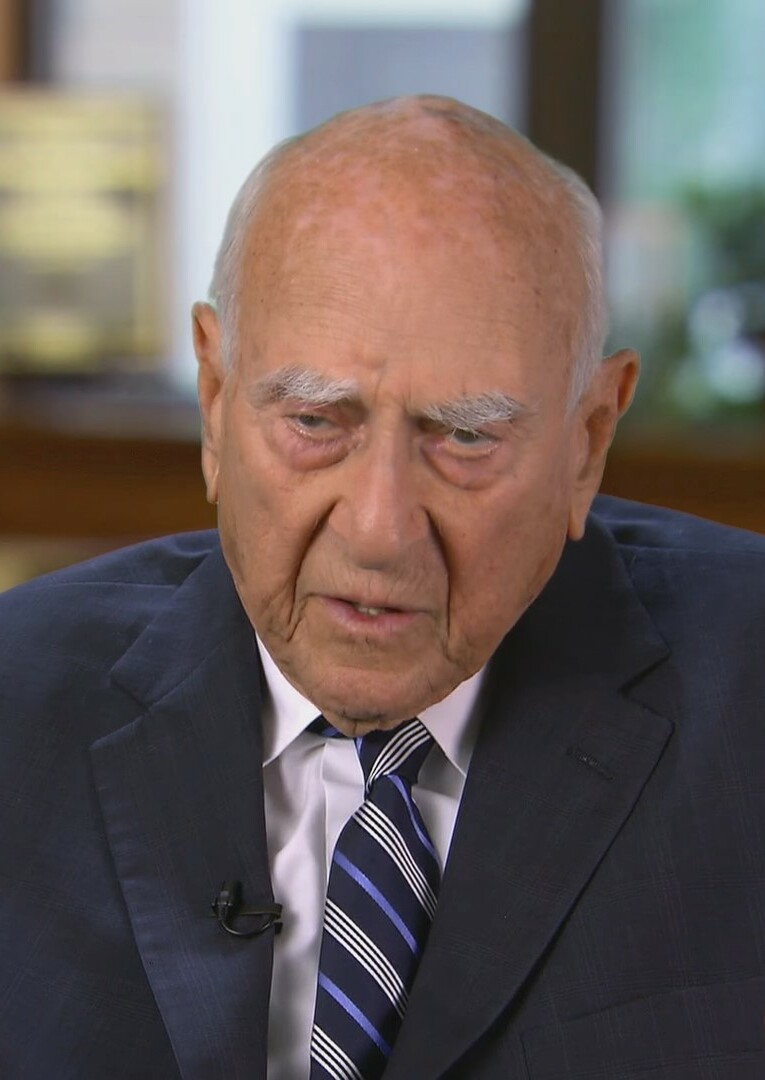
- Weinstein in 2017

Senior Judge of the United States District Court for the Eastern District of New York
- In office March 1, 1993 – June 15, 2021

Chief Judge of the United States District Court for the Eastern District of New York
- In office 1980–1988
- Preceded by: Jacob Mishler
- Succeeded by: Thomas Collier Platt Jr.

Judge of the United States District Court for the Eastern District of New York
- In office April 15, 1967 – March 1, 1993
- Appointed by: Lyndon B. Johnson
- Preceded by: Leo F. Rayfiel
- Succeeded by: John Gleeson

Personal details
- Born: Jack Bertrand Weinstein; August 10, 1921 Wichita, Kansas, U.S.
- Died: June 15, 2021 (aged 99) Great Neck, New York, U.S.
- Education: Brooklyn College (BA); Columbia University (LLB)

Military service
- Allegiance: United States
- Branch/service: United States Navy
- Service years: 1943–1946
- Rank: Lieutenant
- Unit: USS Jallao
- Battles/wars: World War II
- Awards: World War II Victory Medal

Jack Bertrand Weinstein (August 10, 1921 – June 15, 2021) was a United States district judge of the United States District Court for the Eastern District of New York. Until his entry into inactive senior status on February 10, 2020, he maintained a full docket of cases.

== Early life and education ==
Weinstein was born on August 10, 1921, into a Jewish family living temporarily in Wichita, Kansas. He was the son of Harry and Bessie (Brodach) Weinstein. He was raised partly in Brooklyn, New York. He graduated from Abraham Lincoln High School in Brooklyn's Brighton Beach district before receiving a Bachelor of Arts degree from Brooklyn College in 1943. During World War II, he served as a lieutenant in the United States Navy from 1943 to 1946. His duties included serving as deck officer on board the submarine USS Jallao, where he also ran the radar equipment. He graduated from Columbia Law School (on the G.I. Bill) with a Bachelor of Laws degree in 1948.

== Early legal career ==
Weinstein continued to teach at his graduate alma mater as an untenured lecturer in law. In 1949, he completed a clerkship with New York State Court of Appeals Judge Stanley H. Fuld before opening his own law practice in Manhattan a year later—"in part because anti-Semitism at the time made finding work at a firm difficult." Following the recommendation of Columbia colleague Walter Gellhorn, Weinstein also worked with the NAACP Legal Defense Fund during this period; eventually, he was a member of the litigation team for Brown v. Board of Education (although he frequently downplayed his contributions, insisting that he was "doing the kind of work that a young associate would do: preparing briefs and research") before working on the "one man, one vote" litigation of the 1960s. His collaborators included such Columbia colleagues as Charles Black and Jack Greenberg. Weinstein also worked for Republican State Senator Seymour Halpern. While on the faculty of Columbia Law School, he concurrently served as county attorney of Nassau County, New York, from 1963 to 1965, overseeing "a large staff of attorneys who represented various county departments, including the police and social service agencies."

== Federal judicial service ==
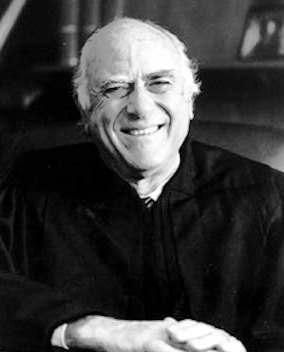
Weinstein on the bench, early 2000s

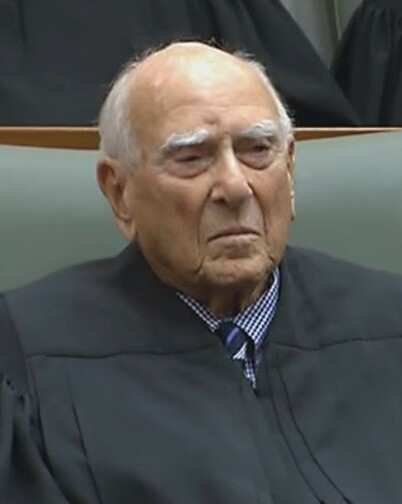
Weinstein on the bench, 2017

On January 16, 1967, President Lyndon B. Johnson nominated him to a federal judge seat in the United States District Court for the Eastern District of New York, recently vacated by Judge Leo F. Rayfiel. Weinstein was confirmed by the United States Senate on April 14, 1967, and received his commission on April 15, 1967. He served as Chief Judge from 1980 to 1988.

As a federal judge, he worked with a number of mass tort cases, including those relating to Agent Orange, asbestos, tobacco, breast implants, diethylstilbestrol, Zyprexa, and handguns. He has been known to take on large numbers of cases from other judges, and on one occasion collected most of the unresolved habeas corpus petitions in the Eastern District to bring finality to the claims of many prisoners. Although Weinstein assumed senior status on March 1, 1993, he continued to maintain a full docket of cases until entering inactive senior status on February 10, 2020. His change to inactive senior status meant that while he remained a federal judge, he no longer heard cases or participated in the business of the court.

== Academic service ==
Following two years in private practice, Weinstein was appointed to a tenured professorship at Columbia Law School from 1952 (becoming a full professor in 1956) until commencing his judicial service in 1967. He was the first legal scholar appointed to Columbia Law School's tenure-track faculty after World War II and remained on the institution's faculty (likely nominally as an adjunct professor, although biographer Jeffrey B. Morris has maintained that Weinstein "was not just a part-time adjunct" because he continued to maintain a full courseload and professional relationships with his Columbia colleagues) until 1998.

From 1987 until his death, he was an adjunct professor at Brooklyn Law School.

== Cases ==
The Second Circuit Appeals court reversed Weinstein's ruling in favor of the City of New York (Mayor Michael Bloomberg) against a group of gun manufacturers. The Second Circuit found the suit to be barred under Protection of Lawful Commerce in Arms Act (PLCAA). From the decision of April 30, 2008; "We conclude that the City's claim, predicated on New York Penal Law § 240.45, does not fall within an exception to the claim restricting provisions of the Act because that statute does not fall within the contours of the Act's predicate exception. We also hold that the PLCAA is a valid exercise of the powers granted to Congress pursuant to the Commerce Clause and that the PLCAA does not violate the doctrine of separation of powers or otherwise offend the Constitution in any manner alleged by the City."

In March 2005, Weinstein dismissed a lawsuit filed by the Vietnamese victims of Agent Orange against producers of chemicals defoliants/herbicides on the grounds that use of the herbicide in warfare had been legal under the international law of the time.

According to a May 2010 New York Times article, Weinstein entered the national debate regarding child pornography laws by issuing a "series of rulings that directly attack the mandatory five-year prison sentence faced by defendants charged with receiving child pornography."

Between 2006 and 2007, Weinstein presided over a case involving the dissemination of Eli Lilly internal documents relating to the drug Zyprexa. Zyprexa was the subject of litigation in which the plaintiffs alleged that Eli Lilly had downplayed certain side effects associated with Zyprexa. An anonymous "citizen-journalist" initially released the internal documents on the public Internet before Weinstein issued an order blocking publication of material that would "facilitate dissemination" of the documents.

In August 2017, Weinstein amended his rule sheet to encourage junior female lawyers to take a speaking role in his courtroom. In October 2017, Weinstein threatened to hold a dedicated hearing on police perjury after allowing allegations to go to trial that police officers had falsely arrested a cashier simply to claim overtime.

In December 2017, Weinstein sentenced three gang members to up to eight years in prison for robbing at gunpoint a family and their five young children inside their home. In his statement of reasons for the sentence, however, Weinstein criticized mandatory sentencing for unjustly punishing the perpetrators as "society's unredeemables". On June 11, 2018, Weinstein explicitly criticized recent Supreme Court precedent when he refused to grant qualified immunity to police officers who had allegedly beaten a resident when he tried to stop them from entering his home without a warrant.

== Death ==
Weinstein died on June 15, 2021, in Great Neck, New York (where he resided for most of his adult life) at the age of 99. He was the last living federal judge appointed by Lyndon B. Johnson.

== Publications ==
Weinstein's publications include leading treatises on evidence and New York practice. He wrote a number of law review articles (not included below) and several books.

Individual Justice in Mass Tort Litigation: The Effect of Class Actions, Consolidations, and Other Multiparty Devices (1995)

Mass Torts:Cases and Materials (with Kenneth Feinberg) (1992)

Chapter VIII - Rulemaking by the Courts: The Judicial Administration Division Handbook, A.B.A. (6th ed., 1981)

Reform of the Court Rulemaking Procedures, The Institute of Comparative Law in Japan (Japanese ed., 1981)

Reform of the Federal Rulemaking Process (Ohio State Univ. Press, 1977)

Basic Problems of State and Federal Evidence (by Edward R. Morgan), 5th ed. Weinstein Rev., (1976)

Weinstein's Evidence (with Prof. Margaret Berger), 7 Volumes, 1975–1979, With Annual Supplements, One Volume, 1987, With Annual Supplements

Cases and Materials on Evidence (with Morgan and Maguire) 1957, (with Maguire, Chadbourn & Mansfield, 1964, 1970, 1973) (with Mansfield, Berger & Abrams, 1981, 1988)

Rules and Statute Supplement (with Mansfield, Abrams & Berger, 1981, 1982, 1987)

Elements of Civil Procedure (with Rosenberg, 1962) (with Rosenberg & Smith, 1970) (1982 Supplement 3rd ed. (with Rosenberg, Smith & Korn))

New York Civil Procedure (with Korn & Miller) 7 Volumes (1976)

Manual of New York Civil Procedure (with Korn & Miller) (1967)

Essays on the New York Constitution (1966)

A New York Constitution Meeting Today's Needs and Tomorrow's Challenges, March (1967)

Various New York Practice Annual Publications (Editor) (1960)

== See also ==
- List of Jewish American jurists
- List of United States federal judges by longevity of service

Legal offices
Preceded by Leo F. Rayfiel	Judge of the United States District Court for the Eastern District of New York; 1967–1993	Succeeded by John Gleeson
Preceded by Jacob Mishler	Chief Judge of the United States District Court for the Eastern District of New York; 1980–1988	Succeeded by Thomas Collier Platt Jr.
