= Margo Kitsy Brodie =

American judge (born 1966)

Margo Brodie
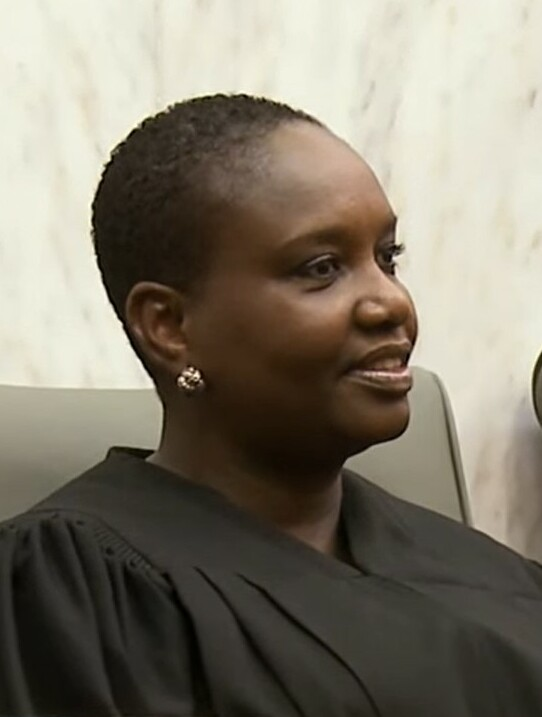
- Brodie in 2015

Chief Judge of the United States District Court for the Eastern District of New York
- Incumbent
- Assumed office February 1, 2021
- Preceded by: Roslynn R. Mauskopf

Judge of the United States District Court for the Eastern District of New York
- Incumbent
- Assumed office February 29, 2012
- Appointed by: Barack Obama
- Preceded by: Allyne R. Ross

Personal details
- Born: Margo Kitsy Williams; 1966 (age 59–60) St. John's, British West Indies (now Antigua and Barbuda)
- Education: St. Francis College (BA); University of Pennsylvania (JD)

Margo Kitsy Brodie (née Williams; born 1966) is the chief United States district judge of the United States District Court for the Eastern District of New York. She became chief judge of the court on February 1, 2021.

== Early life and education ==
Brodie was born Margo Kitsy Williams in St. John's, Antigua. She earned a Bachelor of Arts degree in 1988 from St. Francis College in Brooklyn and then a Juris Doctor in 1991 from the University of Pennsylvania Law School.

== Career ==
Brodie worked for the New York City Law Department from 1991 until 1994, and then at the law firm Carter, Ledyard & Millburn from 1994 until 1999. She then joined the office of the United States attorney for the Eastern District of New York in 1999 as an assistant United States attorney. Brodie was Deputy Chief of the General Crimes Section from 2006 to 2007, Chief of the General Crimes Section from 2007 until 2009, Counselor to the Criminal Division from 2009 to 2010, and deputy chief of the Criminal Division from 2010 to 2012.

=== Federal judicial service ===
On June 7, 2011, President Barack Obama nominated Brodie to a seat on the United States District Court for the Eastern District of New York that had been vacated by Judge Allyne R. Ross, who assumed senior status in April 2011. She received a hearing before the Senate Judiciary Committee on September 7, 2011. Her nomination was reported out of committee by a voice vote on October 6, 2011, and was placed on the Senate Executive Calendar the same day. On February 27, 2012, the United States Senate confirmed Brodie by an 86–2 vote. She received her commission on February 29, 2012. She became chief judge on February 1, 2021.

== See also ==
- List of African-American federal judges
- List of African-American jurists

Legal offices
Preceded by Allyne R. Ross	Judge of the United States District Court for the Eastern District of New York; 2012–present	Incumbent
Preceded by Roslynn R. Mauskopf	Chief Judge of the United States District Court for the Eastern District of New York; 2021–present	Incumbent
