= George Rosling =

American judge

Judge of the United States District Court for the Eastern District of New York
- In office October 5, 1961 – April 16, 1973
- Appointed by: John F. Kennedy
- Preceded by: Seat established by 75 Stat. 80
- Succeeded by: Thomas Collier Platt Jr.

Personal details
- Born: George Rosling; December 22, 1900 New York City, New York
- Died: April 16, 1973 (aged 72) New York City, New York
- Education: Columbia University (A.B.); Brooklyn Law School (LL.B.)

George Rosling (December 22, 1900 – April 16, 1973) was a United States district judge of the United States District Court for the Eastern District of New York.

== Education and career ==
Born in New York City, New York, Rosling received an Artium Baccalaureus degree from Columbia University in 1920. He received a Bachelor of Laws from Brooklyn Law School in 1923. He was in private practice of law in New York City from 1924 to 1960. He was a Justice of the City Court of the City of New York (now the New York City Civil Court) from 1960 to 1961.

== Federal judicial service ==
Rosling received a recess appointment from President John F. Kennedy on October 5, 1961, to the United States District Court for the Eastern District of New York, to a new seat authorized by 75 Stat. 80. He was nominated to the same position by President Kennedy on January 15, 1962. He was confirmed by the United States Senate on March 16, 1962, and received his commission on March 17, 1962. His service terminated on April 16, 1973, due to his death in New York City.

== See also ==
- List of Jewish American jurists

== Sources ==
Legal offices
Preceded by Seat established by 75 Stat. 80	Judge of the United States District Court for the Southern District of New York; 1961–1973	Succeeded by Thomas Collier Platt Jr.
