= Orrin Grimmell Judd =

American judge

Judge of the United States District Court for the Eastern District of New York
- In office July 17, 1968 – July 7, 1976
- Appointed by: Lyndon B. Johnson
- Preceded by: Walter Bruchhausen
- Succeeded by: Eugene Nickerson

Personal details
- Born: Orrin Grimmell Judd; September 6, 1906 Brooklyn, New York
- Died: July 7, 1976 (aged 69) Aspen, Colorado
- Education: Colgate University (A.B.); Harvard Law School (LL.B.)

Orrin Grimmell Judd (September 6, 1906 – July 7, 1976) was a United States district judge of the United States District Court for the Eastern District of New York.

Judd was nominated by President Lyndon B. Johnson on April 25, 1968, to a seat vacated by Walter Bruchhausen. He was confirmed by the United States Senate on June 24, 1968, and received commission on July 17, 1968. Judd's service was terminated on July 7, 1976, due to death.

== Education and career ==
Born in Brooklyn, New York, Judd received an Artium Baccalaureus degree from Colgate University in 1926. He received a Bachelor of Laws from Harvard Law School in 1930. He was a law clerk for Judge Learned Hand of the United States Court of Appeals for the Second Circuit from 1930 to 1931. He was in private practice of law in New York City from 1931 to 1943. He was the State Solicitor General in the New York State Attorney General's Office from 1943 to 1946. He was special counsel to the New York governor for matters relating to the United Nations in 1946. He was in private practice of law in New York City from 1946 to 1964. He was a special hearing officer for conscientious objectors for the United States Department of Justice from 1953 to 1958. He was a Judge of the State Surrogate Court of Kings County, New York in 1964. He was in private practice of law in New York City from 1965 to 1968.

== Federal judicial service ==
Judd was nominated by President Lyndon B. Johnson on April 25, 1968, to a seat on the United States District Court for the Eastern District of New York vacated by Judge Walter Bruchhausen. He was confirmed by the United States Senate on June 24, 1968, and received his commission on July 17, 1968. His service was terminated on July 7, 1976, due to his death of a heart attack in Aspen, Colorado, while attending a judicial seminar.

=== Notable cases ===
During his tenure, Judd oversaw several federal civil rights litigations. The most prominent of these arose from abuses at the Willowbrook State School on Staten Island, involving what Judd described as "inhumane and shocking conditions" at the institution.

Judd's judicial service is best remembered for his order enjoining the United States from engaging in further bombing of Cambodia during the summer of 1973. On July 25, 1973, in the case of Holtzman v. Schlesinger, Judd issued a permanent injunction that prohibited Defense Department officials from "participating in any way in military activities in or over Cambodia or releasing any bombs which may fall in Cambodia." However, a panel of the United States Court of Appeals for the Second Circuit stayed enforcement of the injunction pending appeal. The matter was then taken to the Supreme Court, where Justice Thurgood Marshall refused to interfere with the Court of Appeals' action, leaving the stay of the injunction in place. Justice William O. Douglas then issued a ruling that sought to reinstate the injunction, but Justice Marshall overrode Douglas's order with the concurrence of all the other Justices. On August 15, 1973, a congressionally mandated cut-off of further funding for the bombing took effect, rendering further litigation moot.

== Papers ==
A manuscript collection of Judd's legal and judicial papers is held at the Harvard Law School Library and open for research.

Legal offices
Preceded by Walter Bruchhausen	Judge of the United States District Court for the Eastern District of New York; 1968–1976	Succeeded by Eugene Nickerson
