= Mortimer W. Byers =

American judge (1877–1962)

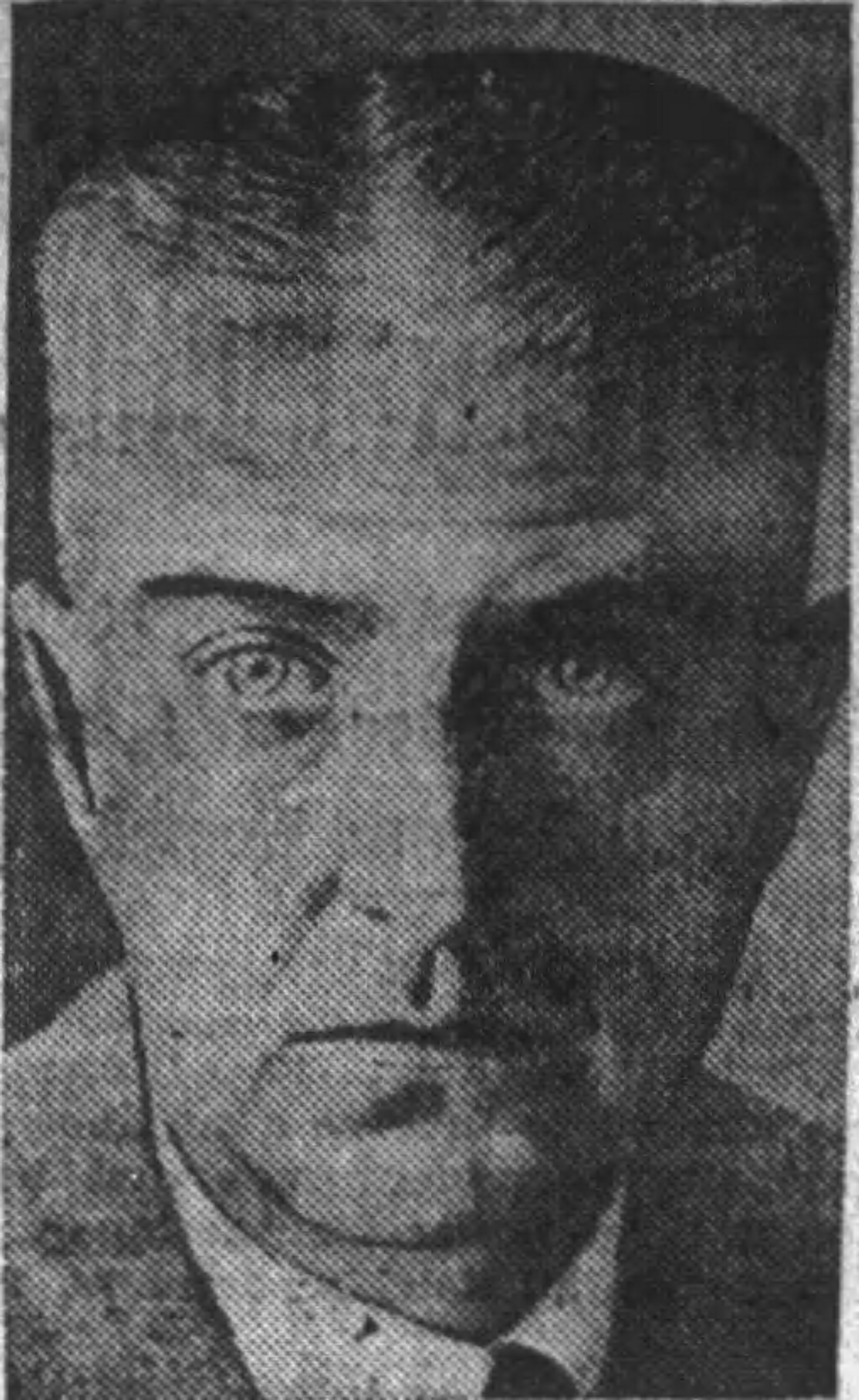
- Byers in 1929

Senior Judge of the United States District Court for the Eastern District of New York
- In office February 1, 1960 – March 5, 1962

Chief Judge of the United States District Court for the Eastern District of New York
- In office 1958–1959
- Preceded by: Robert Alexander Inch
- Succeeded by: Walter Bruchhausen

Judge of the United States District Court for the Eastern District of New York
- In office November 20, 1929 – February 1, 1960
- Appointed by: Herbert Hoover
- Preceded by: Seat established by 45 Stat. 1409
- Succeeded by: Jacob Mishler

Personal details
- Born: Mortimer Wardle Byers; March 28, 1877 Brooklyn, New York
- Died: March 5, 1962 (aged 84) Brooklyn, New York
- Education: Columbia Law School (LL.B.)

Mortimer Wardle Byers (March 28, 1877 – March 5, 1962) was a United States district judge of the United States District Court for the Eastern District of New York from 1929 to 1962 and its chief judge from 1958 to 1959.

== Education and career ==
Born in Brooklyn, New York, Byers received a Bachelor of Laws from Columbia Law School in 1898, and then served as a sergeant in the 23rd Regiment of the New York State National Guard in World War I. He was in private practice of law in Brooklyn from 1898 to 1929.

== Federal judicial service ==
Byers was nominated by President Herbert Hoover on September 9, 1929, to the United States District Court for the Eastern District of New York, to a new seat authorized by 45 Stat. 1409. He was confirmed by the United States Senate on November 20, 1929, and received his commission the same day. He served as Chief Judge from 1958 to 1959. He assumed senior status on February 1, 1960. His service terminated on March 5, 1962, due to his death in Brooklyn.

=== Notable case ===
In 1957, Byers presided over the trial of Soviet spy Vilyam Genrikhovich Fisher (better known by his alias, Rudolf Abel) in what was known as the Hollow Nickel Case. Fisher was convicted on three counts, and on November 15, 1957, Byers sentenced Fisher to concurrent terms of imprisonment of thirty, ten and five years on the three counts and fined him a total of three thousand dollars.

== Portrayal ==
Byers was portrayed by Dakin Matthews in Steven Spielberg's Bridge of Spies.

== Sources ==
Legal offices
Preceded by Seat established by 45 Stat. 1409	Judge of the United States District Court for the Eastern District of New York; 1929–1960	Succeeded by Jacob Mishler
Preceded by Robert Alexander Inch	Chief Judge of the United States District Court for the Eastern District of New York; 1958–1959	Succeeded by Walter Bruchhausen
