= Edward R. Korman =

American judge (born 1942)

Edward Robert Korman
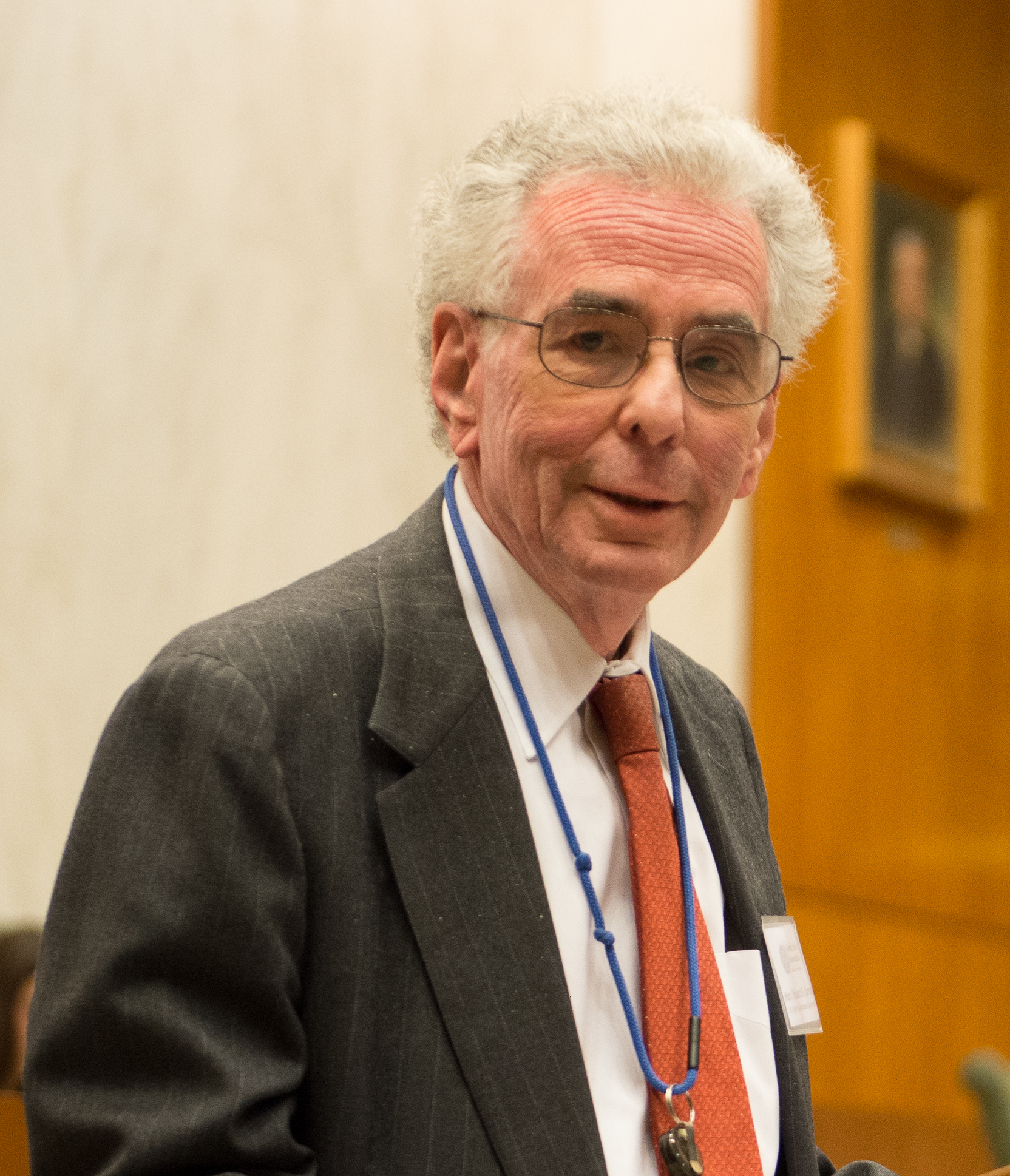

Senior Judge of the United States District Court for the Eastern District of New York
- Incumbent
- Assumed office October 25, 2007

Chief Judge of the United States District Court for the Eastern District of New York
- In office 2000–2007
- Preceded by: Charles Proctor Sifton
- Succeeded by: Raymond Dearie

Judge of the United States District Court for the Eastern District of New York
- In office November 4, 1985 – October 25, 2007
- Appointed by: Ronald Reagan
- Preceded by: Seat established by 98 Stat. 333
- Succeeded by: Kiyo A. Matsumoto

Personal details
- Born: Edward Robert Korman; October 25, 1942 (age 84) New York City, New York, U.S.
- Education: Brooklyn College (BA); Brooklyn Law School (LLB); New York University (LLM)

Edward Robert Korman (born October 25, 1942) is a senior United States district judge serving on the United States District Court for the Eastern District of New York, in Brooklyn, New York.

== Education and career ==
Korman is the son of Jewish immigrants from Ukraine and Poland. Born in New York City, New York, Korman earned a Bachelor of Arts degree from Brooklyn College in 1966, a Bachelor of Laws from Brooklyn Law School in 1966, and a Master of Laws from New York University School of Law in 1971. From 1966 to 1968, he served as law clerk to Judge Kenneth B. Keating of the New York Court of Appeals. Korman was an Associate at Paul, Weiss, Rifkind, Wharton & Garrison in New York City from 1968 to 1970. In 1970, Korman became an assistant United States attorney in the Eastern District of New York, where he served until 1972.

From 1972 to 1974, Korman was an assistant to the Solicitor General of the United States. He then returned to the United States Attorney's Office of the Eastern District of New York, where he served as Chief Assistant United States Attorney from 1974 to 1978, and as United States Attorney from 1978 to 1982. During this period, he investigated Donald Trump for a questionable real estate transaction; though charges were never brought, Korman's investigation was framed as a significant turning point in Trump's relationship with the authorities during subsequent criminal investigations in 2022 and 2023. From 1982 to 1985, Korman worked as partner and of counsel at the firm Stroock & Stroock & Lavan in New York City. During the school year dating 1984 to 1985, Korman taught as a professor at Brooklyn Law School. Starting in 1983 and continuing until Korman's appointment to the bench, he was a member of the Temporary Commission of Investigation of the State of New York and Chairman of the Mayor's Committee on New York City Marshals. Korman is married and has two children.

=== Federal judicial service ===
Korman was nominated by President Ronald Reagan on October 2, 1985, to the United States District Court for the Eastern District of New York, to a new seat authorized by 98 Stat. 333. He was confirmed by the United States Senate on November 1, 1985, and received commission on November 4, 1985, entering service on December 16, 1985. He served as chief judge from 2000 to 2007. He assumed senior status on October 25, 2007. In addition to continuing his caseload in Brooklyn, Korman has also sat by designation on the Second, Sixth, and Ninth Circuit Courts of Appeals from 2008 to present.

Korman has been described as "an intellectual judge, even a brilliant judge," with "a reputation as one of the nicest judges around," known for an understanding attitude toward defendants.

== Selected publications and awards ==
In 2005, Korman wrote the foreword to the book The Lie That Wouldn't Die: The Protocols of the Elders of Zion, by Haddassa Ben-Itto. He wrote an essay in 2006 titled "Rewriting the Holocaust History of the Swiss Banks: A Growing Scandal," which was published in Holocaust Restitution: Perspectives on the Litigation and its Legacy, edited by Michael Bazyler and Roger P. Alford. Korman also co-authored a biographical essay on Judge Kenneth B. Keating of the New York Court of Appeals, published in The Judges of the New York Court of Appeals, a Biographical History, edited by Albert M. Rosenthal.

Judge Korman has received numerous awards, some of which include:

- Award for Outstanding Judicial Contribution in the Criminal Justice System, New York State Bar Association, 1996;
- Edward Weinfeld Award for Distinguished Contributions to the Administration of Justice, New York County Lawyers Association, 2002;
- Honorary Doctor of Laws, Brooklyn Law School, 2003;
- Learned Hand Medal for Excellence in Federal Jurisprudence, Federal Bar Council, 2006;
- Honorary Doctor of Humane Letters for Invaluable Contribution to the American Legal System, Brooklyn College, 2014.

== Selected decisions ==
1989: Korman ordered the extradition of Mahmoud Abed Atta (a member of the Abu Nidal Organization) to Israel to stand trial for a terrorist bombing that occurred on a bus traveling between the West Bank and Tel Aviv.

1992: Highlighting the defendant's lack of remorse, Korman sentenced a prominent corporate attorney, Harvey D. Myerson, to the severe sentence of 70 months in prison for committing over $2 million in tax fraud and fraud related to overbilling clients. The court of appeals affirmed.

1994: Korman sentenced a teenager to life in prison without parole following his conviction for killing a journalist in exchange for pay from a Colombian drug cartel angered by the journalist's publications.

1996: In a case involving a journalist murdered following the journalist's anti-drug cartel writings, Korman leniently sentenced two defendants convicted of murder conspiracy to 15 and 18 years, respectively. Korman cited the assistance that the defendants provided to the prosecution and the need to balance punishment with incentives for cooperation.

1996: Korman held that the Republican Party's primary system had an unconstitutional "chilling effect" on certain viable candidates. He wrote, "only the most atypical of candidates, ones with unlimited financial resources" had a chance of their names appearing on the ballot. The court of appeals affirmed Korman's ruling. The decision became the subject of various academic publications, including an article in the Georgetown Law Journal.

1998-2005: Korman oversaw a class-action settlement involving certain Swiss banks that retained the assets of Holocaust victims following World War II. The banks ultimately agreed to pay victims and their heirs approximately $1.25 billion. In allocating the assets, Korman implemented a "needs-based" system, allocating a greater percentage for those parties most in need of financial assistance. The Second Circuit referred to Korman's approach as "thoughtful" and "scrupulous[ly] fair." Senator Alfonse D'Amato praised Korman's efforts as "Solomonlike" and "extraordinary." In later years, however, academic Norman Finkelstein chastises Korman's approach as one that erroneously accepted inflated evidence regarding the value of retained assets of Holocaust victims, contributing to systematic "blackmail" of the Swiss banks through forcing them to pay incorrectly large monetary sums to settle the lawsuit.

2000: Korman found that the Republican presidential nomination scheme was unconstitutional as "pos[ing] an undue burden in its totality on the right to vote." The New York Times stated that Korman's ruling "gave Republicans in the state something Republicans take for granted elsewhere . . . the opportunity to choose from a full slate of candidates." The decision was the subject of numerous academic publications, including an article in the Georgetown Law Journal.

2005: Korman presided over the trial of the 2003 money laundering case of record label executive Irv Gotti and Kenneth "Supreme" McGriff.

2007: Following the 2003 Staten Island Ferry crash, Korman refused to allow New York City to cap its liability, holding that an obscure maritime law did not apply because the city's managers had been negligent in disobeying a city rule requiring that two captains remain in the pilot house while the ferry was in motion.

== See also ==
- List of Jewish American jurists

Legal offices
Preceded by David G. Trager	United States Attorney for the Eastern District of New York; 1978–1982	Succeeded by Raymond Dearie
Preceded by Seat established by 98 Stat. 333	Judge of the United States District Court for the Eastern District of New York; 1985–2007	Succeeded by Kiyo A. Matsumoto
Preceded by Charles Proctor Sifton	Chief Judge of the United States District Court for the Eastern District of New York; 2000–2007	Succeeded by Raymond Dearie
