= John R. Bartels =

American judge (1897–1997)

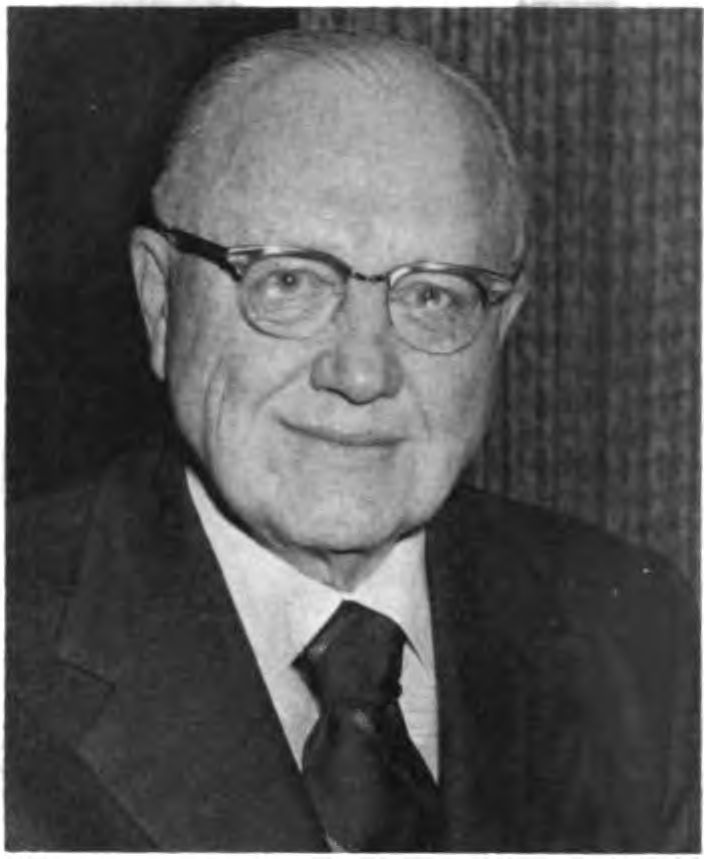

Senior Judge of the United States District Court for the Eastern District of New York
- In office December 31, 1973 – February 13, 1997

Judge of the United States District Court for the Eastern District of New York
- In office July 30, 1959 – December 31, 1973
- Appointed by: Dwight D. Eisenhower
- Preceded by: Robert Alexander Inch
- Succeeded by: Henry Bramwell

Personal details
- Born: John Ries Bartels; November 8, 1897 Baltimore, Maryland, U.S.
- Died: February 13, 1997 (aged 99) Brooklyn, New York, U.S.
- Education: Johns Hopkins University (A.B.); Harvard Law School (LL.B.)

John Ries Bartels (November 8, 1897 – February 13, 1997) was a United States district judge of the United States District Court for the Eastern District of New York.

== Education and career ==
Born on November 8, 1897, in Baltimore, Maryland, Bartels received an Artium Baccalaureus degree in 1920 from Johns Hopkins University and a Bachelor of Laws in 1923 from Harvard Law School. He served in the United States Army in 1918. He entered private practice in New York City, New York from 1925 to 1959. He was a member of the New York State Law Review Commission from 1945 to 1950 and again from 1952 to 1957. He was a Justice of the New York Supreme Court for Kings County from 1950 to 1951.

== Federal judicial service ==
Bartels was nominated by President Dwight D. Eisenhower on April 20, 1959, to a seat on the United States District Court for the Eastern District of New York vacated by Judge Robert Alexander Inch. He was confirmed by the United States Senate on July 28, 1959, and received his commission on July 30, 1959. He assumed senior status on December 31, 1973. His service terminated on February 13, 1997, due to his death in Brooklyn, New York.

Legal offices
Preceded by Robert Alexander Inch	Judge of the United States District Court for the Eastern District of New York; 1959–1973	Succeeded by Henry Bramwell
