= List of federal judges appointed by Warren G. Harding =

List of judges

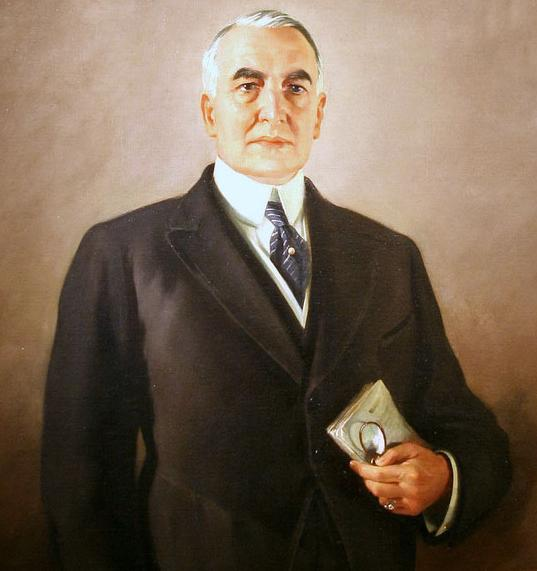
President Warren G. Harding.

Following is a list of all Article III United States federal judges appointed by President Warren G. Harding during his presidency. In total Harding appointed 52 Article III federal judges, including 4 Justices to the Supreme Court of the United States (including one Chief Justice), 6 judges to the United States Courts of Appeals, and 42 judges to the United States district courts.

Additionally, Harding appointed 4 judges to the United States Court of Customs Appeals, an Article I tribunal.

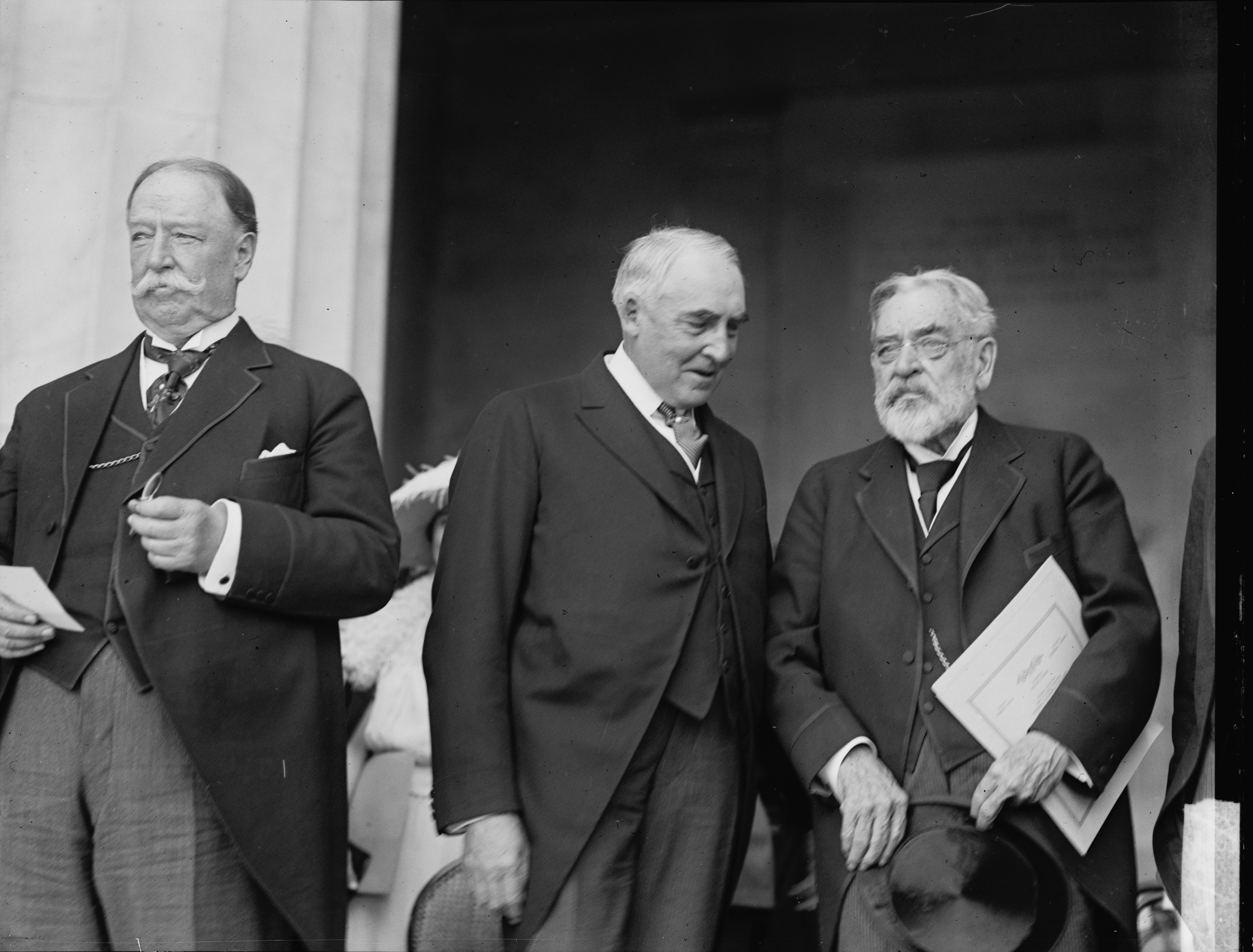
Harding (center) appointed William Howard Taft (left) as Chief Justice.

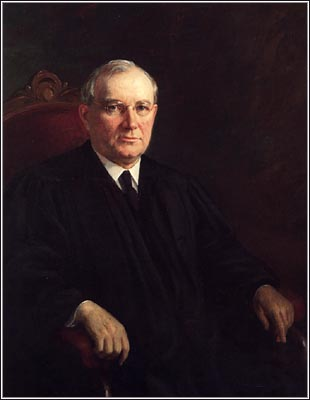
Pierce Butler was the last of Harding's Supreme Court appointees to remain active on the Court.

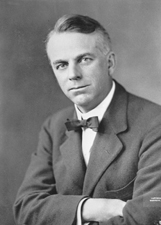
Harding appointed sitting Senator William S. Kenyon to the United States Court of Appeals for the Eighth Circuit.

== United States Supreme Court justices ==
#	Justice	Seat	State	Former justice	Nomination date	Confirmation date	Began active service	Ended active service	Ended retired service
1	William Howard Taft	Chief	Ohio	Edward Douglass White	June 30, 1921	June 30, 1921	June 30, 1921	February 3, 1930	–
2	George Sutherland	6	Utah	John Hessin Clarke	September 5, 1922	September 5, 1922	September 5, 1922	January 17, 1938	July 18, 1942
3	Pierce Butler	10	Minnesota	William R. Day	November 21, 1922 (Note: Renominated on December 5, 1922.)	December 21, 1922	December 21, 1922	November 16, 1939	–
4	Edward Terry Sanford	8	Tennessee	Mahlon Pitney	January 24, 1923	January 29, 1923	January 29, 1923	March 8, 1930	–

== Courts of appeals ==
#	Judge	Circuit	Nomination date	Confirmation date	Began active service	Ended active service	Ended senior status
1	Edmund Waddill Jr.	Fourth	May 26, 1921	June 2, 1921	June 2, 1921	April 9, 1931	–
2	Julius Marshuetz Mayer	Second	September 22, 1921	October 5, 1921	October 5, 1921	July 31, 1924	–
3	Robert E. Lewis	Eighth / Tenth	November 3, 1921	November 15, 1921	November 15, 1921	May 31, 1940	July 31, 1941
4	William S. Kenyon	Eighth	January 31, 1922	January 31, 1922	January 31, 1922	September 9, 1933	–
5	John Carter Rose	Fourth	November 27, 1922 (Note: Renominated on December 9, 1922.)	December 20, 1922	December 20, 1922	March 26, 1927	–
6	Frank H. Rudkin	Ninth	January 5, 1923	January 9, 1923	January 9, 1923	May 3, 1931	–

== District courts ==
#	Judge	Court (Note: See List of United States district and territorial courts)	Nomination date	Confirmation date	Began active service	Ended active service	Ended senior status
1	Claude Luse	W.D. Wis.	April 14, 1921	April 27, 1921	April 1, 1921	May 28, 1932	–
2	William E. Baker	N.D. W. Va.	April 14, 1921	May 3, 1921	April 4, 1921	April 3, 1954	June 4, 1954
3	John William Ross	W.D. Tenn.	May 26, 1921	May 31, 1921	May 31, 1921	July 9, 1925	–
4	Duncan Lawrence Groner	E.D. Va.	May 26, 1921	June 2, 1921	June 2, 1921	March 3, 1931	Elevated
5	Adolph A. Hoehling Jr.	D.D.C.	June 6, 1921	June 13, 1921	June 13, 1921	December 31, 1927	–
6	George Warwick McClintic	S.D. W. Va.	July 19, 1921	July 25, 1921	July 25, 1921	March 1, 1941	September 25, 1942
7	Thomas Blake Kennedy	D. Wyo.	October 17, 1921	October 25, 1921	October 25, 1921	November 6, 1955	May 21, 1957
8	George Franklin Morris	D.N.H.	October 20, 1921	October 25, 1921	October 25, 1921	April 30, 1943	March 25, 1953
9	John A. Peters	D. Me.	October 25, 1921	November 14, 1921	November 14, 1921	January 2, 1947	August 1, 1953
10	Andrew Miller	D.N.D.	December 19, 1921	February 2, 1922	February 2, 1922	March 29, 1941	March 17, 1960
11	George Cromwell Scott	N.D. Iowa	February 16, 1922	February 21, 1922	February 21, 1922	November 1, 1943	October 6, 1948
12	John Foster Symes	D. Colo.	April 22, 1922	May 16, 1922	May 16, 1922	April 14, 1950	April 5, 1951
13	William H. Barrett	S.D. Ga.	June 14, 1922	June 22, 1922	June 22, 1922	May 1, 1941	–
14	James Herbert Wilkerson	N.D. Ill.	July 11, 1922	July 18, 1922	July 18, 1922	December 31, 1940	September 30, 1948
15	Robert Murray Gibson	W.D. Pa.	July 18, 1922	July 24, 1922	July 24, 1922	January 31, 1949	December 19, 1949
16	Elisha Hume Brewster	D. Mass.	September 20, 1922	September 22, 1922	September 22, 1922	October 14, 1941	April 29, 1946
17	Walter C. Lindley	E.D. Ill.	September 20, 1922	September 22, 1922	September 22, 1922	October 23, 1949	Elevated
18	James Arnold Lowell	D. Mass.	September 20, 1922	September 22, 1922	September 22, 1922	November 30, 1933	–
19	Adam C. Cliffe	N.D. Ill.	December 20, 1922	December 22, 1922	December 22, 1922	June 12, 1928	–
20	Frederic Palen Schoonmaker	W.D. Pa.	December 20, 1922	December 22, 1922	December 22, 1922	September 5, 1945	–
21	Marcus Beach Campbell	E.D.N.Y.	December 28, 1922	January 3, 1923	January 3, 1923	August 3, 1944	–
22	Henry W. Goddard	S.D.N.Y.	December 28, 1922	January 4, 1923	January 4, 1923	February 1, 1954	August 26, 1955
23	Francis A. Winslow	S.D.N.Y.	December 28, 1922	January 4, 1923	January 4, 1923	April 1, 1929	–
24	William H. Atwell	N.D. Tex.	December 30, 1922	January 9, 1923	January 9, 1923	December 31, 1954	December 22, 1961
25	William Nelson Runyon	D.N.J.	December 30, 1922	January 16, 1923	January 16, 1923	November 9, 1931	–
26	Charles C. Simons	E.D. Mich.	January 31, 1923	February 6, 1923	February 6, 1923	February 2, 1932	Elevated
27	Charles Louis McKeehan	E.D. Pa.	January 30, 1923	February 9, 1923	February 9, 1923	March 23, 1925	–
28	Morris Ames Soper	D. Md.	February 10, 1923	February 24, 1923	February 24, 1923	May 9, 1931	Elevated
29	William Bondy	S.D.N.Y.	February 28, 1923	March 2, 1923	March 2, 1923	May 1, 1956	March 30, 1964
30	John J. Gore	M.D. Tenn.	February 28, 1923	March 2, 1923	March 2, 1923	February 21, 1939	–
31	Xenophon Hicks	E.D. Tenn. M.D. Tenn.	February 28, 1923	March 2, 1923	March 2, 1923	May 23, 1928	Elevated
32	Fred Clinton Jacobs	D. Ariz.	February 28, 1923	March 2, 1923	March 2, 1923	May 31, 1936	February 21, 1958
33	Paul Jones	N.D. Ohio	February 28, 1923	March 2, 1923	March 2, 1923	August 4, 1965	–
34	John F. McGee	D. Minn.	February 28, 1923	March 2, 1923	March 2, 1923	February 15, 1925	–
35	Smith Hickenlooper	S.D. Ohio	March 3, 1923	March 3, 1923	March 3, 1923	January 7, 1929	Elevated
36	William P. James	S.D. Cal.	March 2, 1923	March 3, 1923	March 3, 1923	July 28, 1940	–
37	John Slater Partridge	N.D. Cal.	March 2, 1923	March 3, 1923	March 3, 1923	May 20, 1926	–
38	Orie Leon Phillips	D.N.M.	February 28, 1923	March 3, 1923	March 3, 1923	April 29, 1929	Elevated
39	Robert Alexander Inch	E.D.N.Y.	–	–	April 28, 1923	January 6, 1958	January 12, 1961
40	J. Stanley Webster	E.D. Wash.	–	–	April 28, 1923	August 31, 1939	December 24, 1962
41	William Alexander Cant	D. Minn.	–	–	May 21, 1923	January 12, 1933	–
42	Albert L. Reeves	W.D. Mo.	January 16, 1923	January 24, 1923	June 24, 1923	February 2, 1954	March 24, 1971

== Specialty courts (Article I) ==
=== United States Court of Customs Appeals ===
#	Judge	Nomination date	Confirmation date	Began active service	Ended active service	Ended senior status
1	Marion De Vries	June 23, 1921	June 28, 1921	June 28, 1921	October 31, 1922	–
2	George Ewing Martin	December 28, 1922	January 4, 1923	January 4, 1923	May 24, 1924	Elevated
3	Oscar E. Bland	March 2, 1923	March 3, 1923	March 3, 1923	December 1, 1947	–
4	Charles Sherrod Hatfield	March 2, 1923	March 3, 1923	March 3, 1923	February 9, 1950	–

== Notes ==
Renominations
