= Thomas Collier Platt Jr. =

American judge

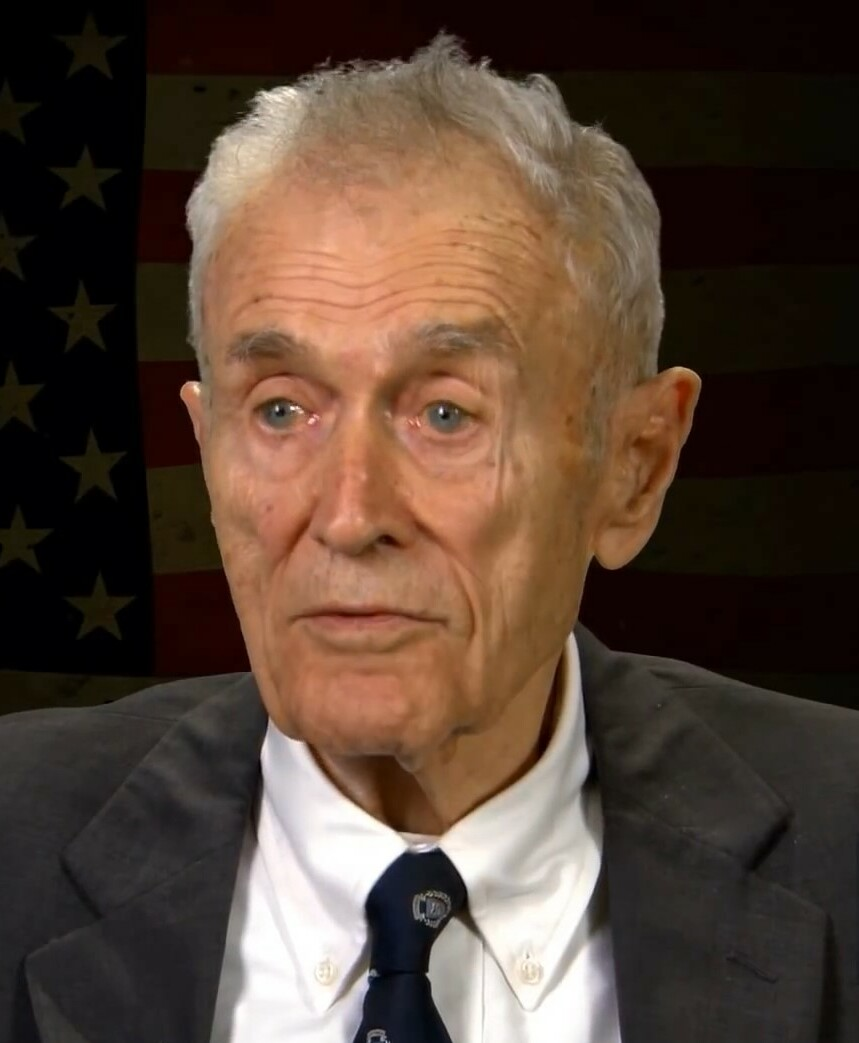
- Platt in 2014

Senior Judge of the United States District Court for the Eastern District of New York
- In office February 1, 2001 – March 4, 2017

Chief Judge of the United States District Court for the Eastern District of New York
- In office 1988–1995
- Preceded by: Jack B. Weinstein
- Succeeded by: Charles Proctor Sifton

Judge of the United States District Court for the Eastern District of New York
- In office March 8, 1974 – February 1, 2001
- Appointed by: Richard Nixon
- Preceded by: George Rosling
- Succeeded by: Sandra J. Feuerstein

Personal details
- Born: Thomas Collier Platt Jr. May 29, 1925 New York City, New York
- Died: March 4, 2017 (aged 91) North Branford, Connecticut
- Relations: Thomas Collier Platt (great-grandfather)
- Education: Yale University (B.A.); Yale Law School (LL.B.)

Thomas Collier Platt Jr. (May 29, 1925 – March 4, 2017) was a United States district judge of the United States District Court for the Eastern District of New York from 1974 to 2017 and its chief judge from 1988 to 1995.

== Education and career ==
A great-grandson of former United States Senator Thomas Collier Platt, he was born on May 29, 1925, in New York City, New York. He was in the United States Naval Reserve from 1943 to 1946. He received a Bachelor of Arts degree from Yale University in 1947, and a Bachelor of Laws from Yale Law School in 1950. While in law school, Platt married Anne Byrd Symington in 1948. After engaging in private practice in New York City from 1950 to 1953, he became an Assistant United States Attorney of the Eastern District of New York, serving from 1953 to 1956. He then returned to private practice in New York City, while also serving as an attorney for Village of Laurel Hollow, New York from 1958 to 1974, and acting police justice in the Village of Lloyd Harbor, New York from 1958 to 1963.

== Federal judicial service ==
Platt was nominated by President Richard Nixon on January 31, 1974, to a seat on the United States District Court for the Eastern District of New York vacated by Judge George Rosling. He was confirmed by the United States Senate on March 1, 1974, and received his commission on March 8, 1974. At the time of his nomination, he was the first federal district court judge from Suffolk County, New York. He served as Chief Judge of the Eastern District from 1988 to 1995. After over 25 years of active service, Platt assumed senior status on February 1, 2001, and served in that capacity until his death on March 4, 2017, in North Branford, Connecticut.

Legal offices
Preceded by George Rosling	Judge of the United States District Court for the Eastern District of New York; 1974–2001	Succeeded by Sandra J. Feuerstein
Preceded by Jack B. Weinstein	Chief Judge of the United States District Court for the Eastern District of New York; 1988–1995	Succeeded by Charles Proctor Sifton
