= Roslynn R. Mauskopf =

American judge (born 1957)

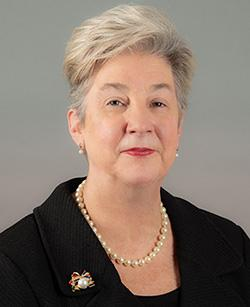

Director of the Administrative Office of the United States Courts
- In office February 1, 2021 – January 31, 2024
- Appointed by: John Roberts
- Preceded by: James C. Duff
- Succeeded by: Robert J. Conrad

Chief Judge of the United States District Court for the Eastern District of New York
- In office January 26, 2020 – February 1, 2021
- Preceded by: Dora Irizarry
- Succeeded by: Margo Kitsy Brodie

Judge of the United States District Court for the Eastern District of New York
- In office October 18, 2007 – January 31, 2024
- Appointed by: George W. Bush
- Preceded by: David G. Trager
- Succeeded by: Seat abolished

United States Attorney for the Eastern District of New York
- In office 2002–2007
- Appointed by: George W. Bush
- Preceded by: Loretta Lynch
- Succeeded by: Benton J. Campbell

Personal details
- Born: February 7, 1957 (age 69) Washington, D.C., U.S.
- Education: Brandeis University (BA); Georgetown University (JD)

Roslynn Renee Mauskopf (born February 7, 1957) is an American lawyer and former United States district judge of the United States District Court for the Eastern District of New York and director of the Administrative Office of the United States Courts. She previously served as the chief judge of the United States District Court for the Eastern District of New York from 2020 to 2021 and as the United States attorney for the Eastern District of New York from 2002 to 2007.

== Education ==
Mauskopf earned a Bachelor of Arts degree from Brandeis University in 1979 and a Juris Doctor from the Georgetown University Law Center in 1982.

== Career ==
Prior to her appointment, Mauskopf as the United States attorney for the Eastern District of New York from 2002 to 2007. Before that, Mauskopf served as the inspector general of New York from 1995 to 2002.

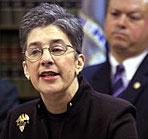
Roslynn Renee Mauskopf, 2004

Mauskopf began her legal career in 1982 as an assistant District attorney in the New York County District Attorney's Office, a position she held until her appointment as New York State inspector general in 1995. Among other positions in the office, Mauskopf served as chief of the Frauds Bureau. She was also a deputy chief of the Special Prosecutions Bureau.

=== Federal judicial service ===
She entered service as a United States district judge in the Eastern District of New York in October 2007. Mauskopf was nominated by President George W. Bush on January 9, 2007 upon the recommendation of Governor George Pataki. On October 4, 2007, the United States Senate confirmed Mauskopf by unanimous consent. She received her commission on October 18, 2007. She became chief judge on January 26, 2020, after Dora Irizarry assumed senior status, and served in that capacity until February 1, 2021. She retired on January 31, 2024. Since her retirement, she joined a law firm, Bracewell LLP in New York.

=== Administrative Office of the United States Courts ===
After the retirement of Director James C. Duff on December 31, 2020, on January 5, 2021, Chief Justice John Roberts appointed Mauskopf to be the next director of the Administrative Office of the United States Courts effective February 1, 2021.

Legal offices
Preceded by David G. Trager	Judge of the United States District Court for the Eastern District of New York; 2007–2024	Seat abolished pursuant to 104 Stat. 5089
Preceded by Dora Irizarry	Chief Judge of the United States District Court for the Eastern District of New York; 2020–2021	Succeeded by Margo Kitsy Brodie
