= Harold Maurice Kennedy =

American judge

Judge of the United States District Court for the Eastern District of New York
- In office September 22, 1944 – September 30, 1952
- Appointed by: Franklin D. Roosevelt
- Preceded by: Marcus Beach Campbell
- Succeeded by: Walter Bruchhausen

Personal details
- Born: Harold Maurice Kennedy; August 6, 1895 Brooklyn, New York
- Died: July 1, 1971 (aged 75) New York City, New York
- Education: City College of New York (A.B.); Brooklyn Law School (LL.B., J.D.)

Harold Maurice Kennedy (August 6, 1895 – July 1, 1971) was a United States district judge of the United States District Court for the Eastern District of New York.

== Education and career ==
Born in Brooklyn, New York, Kennedy received an Artium Baccalaureus degree from the City College of New York in 1917, a Bachelor of Laws from Brooklyn Law School in 1924 and a Juris Doctor from the same institution in 1925. He served in the United States Navy as a lieutenant junior grade from 1917 to 1920. He was in private practice in Brooklyn from 1925 to 1944. He was an assistant attorney general for the State of New York from 1939 to 1939. He was United States Attorney for the Eastern District of New York from 1939 to 1944.

== Federal judicial service ==
Kennedy was nominated by President Franklin D. Roosevelt on September 1, 1944, to a seat on the United States District Court for the Eastern District of New York vacated by Judge Marcus Beach Campbell. He was confirmed by the United States Senate on September 20, 1944, and received his commission on September 22, 1944. His service terminated on September 30, 1952, due to his resignation.

== Post judicial service and death ==
After his resignation from the federal bench, Kennedy returned to private practice in Brooklyn from 1952 to 1961. He died July 1, 1971, in New York City, New York.

== Sources ==
Political offices
Preceded by Vine H. Smith (acting)	United States Attorney for the Eastern District of New York; 1939–1944	Succeeded by T. Vincent Quinn
Legal offices
Preceded by Marcus Beach Campbell	Judge of the United States District Court for the Eastern District of New York; 1944–1952	Succeeded by Walter Bruchhausen
