= Sandra J. Feuerstein =

American judge (1946–2021)

Sandra Jeanne Feuerstein

Senior Judge of the United States District Court for the Eastern District of New York
- In office January 21, 2015 – April 9, 2021

Judge of the United States District Court for the Eastern District of New York
- In office September 22, 2003 – January 21, 2015
- Appointed by: George W. Bush
- Preceded by: Thomas Collier Platt Jr.
- Succeeded by: Gary R. Brown

Personal details
- Born: January 21, 1946 New York City, U.S.
- Died: April 9, 2021 (aged 75) Boca Raton, Florida, U.S.
- Education: University of Vermont (BS); Yeshiva University (JD)

Sandra Jeanne Feuerstein (January 21, 1946 – April 9, 2021) was a United States district judge of the United States District Court for the Eastern District of New York.

== Education and career ==
Born in New York City, Feuerstein received a Bachelor of Science degree from the University of Vermont in 1966 and a Juris Doctor from the Benjamin N. Cardozo School of Law at Yeshiva University in 1979. She was a teacher in the New York Public School System (Frances X. Hegarty Elementary School/Island Park) from 1966 to 1971. She was a law clerk in the New York Supreme Court Law Department from 1980 to 1985, and to Judge Leo H. McGinity, New York State Appellate Division, from 1985 to 1987. She was a judge on the Nassau County District Court from 1987 to 1994. She then served as a justice of the New York Supreme Court Tenth Judicial District from 1994 to 1999, and as an associate justice of the New York Supreme Court Appellate Division Second Judicial Department from 1999 to 2003.

== Federal judicial service ==
She was nominated to the federal bench by George W. Bush on January 7, 2003, to a seat vacated by Thomas Collier Platt Jr., confirmed by the United States Senate on September 17, 2003, and received her commission on September 22, 2003. She assumed senior status on January 21, 2015.

== Personal life ==
She was the daughter of Judge Annette Elstein (June 30, 1920 – April 6, 2020). Feuerstein and Elstein were believed to be the first mother-daughter judges in United States history.

Feuerstein died on April 9, 2021, after being struck by a car in a hit and run incident in Boca Raton, Florida. In September 2024, the driver, Nastasia Snape, was sentenced to four years in prison plus 26 years probation for her death.

== See also ==
- List of Jewish American jurists

Legal offices
Preceded by Thomas Collier Platt Jr.	Judge of the United States District Court for the Eastern District of New York; 2003–2015	Succeeded by Gary R. Brown
