= David G. Trager =

American judge (1937–2011)

David Gershon Trager

Senior Judge of the United States District Court for the Eastern District of New York
- In office March 1, 2006 – January 5, 2011

Judge of the United States District Court for the Eastern District of New York
- In office November 24, 1993 – March 1, 2006
- Appointed by: Bill Clinton
- Preceded by: Seat established by 104 Stat. 5089
- Succeeded by: Roslynn R. Mauskopf

Personal details
- Born: David Gershon Trager; December 23, 1937 Mount Vernon, New York, U.S.
- Died: January 5, 2011 (aged 73) Brooklyn, New York, U.S.
- Education: Columbia University (BA); Harvard University (LLB)

David Gershon Trager (December 23, 1937 – January 5, 2011) was a United States district judge of the United States District Court for the Eastern District of New York.

== Education ==
Born in Mount Vernon, New York, Trager received a Bachelor of Arts degree from Columbia University in 1959 and a Bachelor of Laws from Harvard Law School in 1962. He was in private practice of law in New York City from 1963 to 1967, acting as assistant corporation counsel to New York City in 1967. He was a law clerk to Kenneth B. Keating of the New York State Court of Appeals from 1968 to 1969, and to Stanley H. Fuld, Chief Judge of the Court of Appeals in 1969.

== Career ==
Trager became an assistant United States attorney of Eastern District of New York from 1970 to 1972. He was an associate professor of law at Brooklyn Law School from 1972 to 1974. He was United States Attorney for the Eastern District of New York from 1974 to 1978.

He returned to Brooklyn Law School as a professor of law from 1978 to 1993, serving as dean of that institution from 1983 to 1993. He chaired a temporary state commission on investigations in New York State from 1983 to 1990, and was a member of the New York City Mayor's Committee on the Judiciary from 1981 to 1989.

=== Federal judicial service ===
On August 6, 1993, Trager was nominated by President Bill Clinton to a new seat on the United States District Court for the Eastern District of New York created by 104 Stat. 5089. He was confirmed by the United States Senate on November 20, 1993, and received commission on November 24, 1993. Trager assumed senior status on March 1, 2006.

== Recusal ==
In 1994, Trager was recused from working on the Crown Heights riot, due to potential bias as well as impartiality.

== Death ==
Trager died, in his home in Brooklyn, of pancreatic cancer on January 5, 2011, aged 73.

== See also ==
- List of Jewish American jurists

== Sources ==
Academic offices
Preceded by I. Leo Glasser	Dean of Brooklyn Law School; 1983–1993	Succeeded by Joan G. Wexler
Legal offices
Preceded by Edward J. Boyd	United States Attorney for the Eastern District of New York; 1974–1978	Succeeded by Edward R. Korman
Preceded by Seat established by 104 Stat. 5089	Judge of the United States District Court for the Eastern District of New York; 1993–2006	Succeeded by Roslynn R. Mauskopf
