= Eugene Nickerson =

US federal judge (1918–2002)

Eugene Hoffman Nickerson
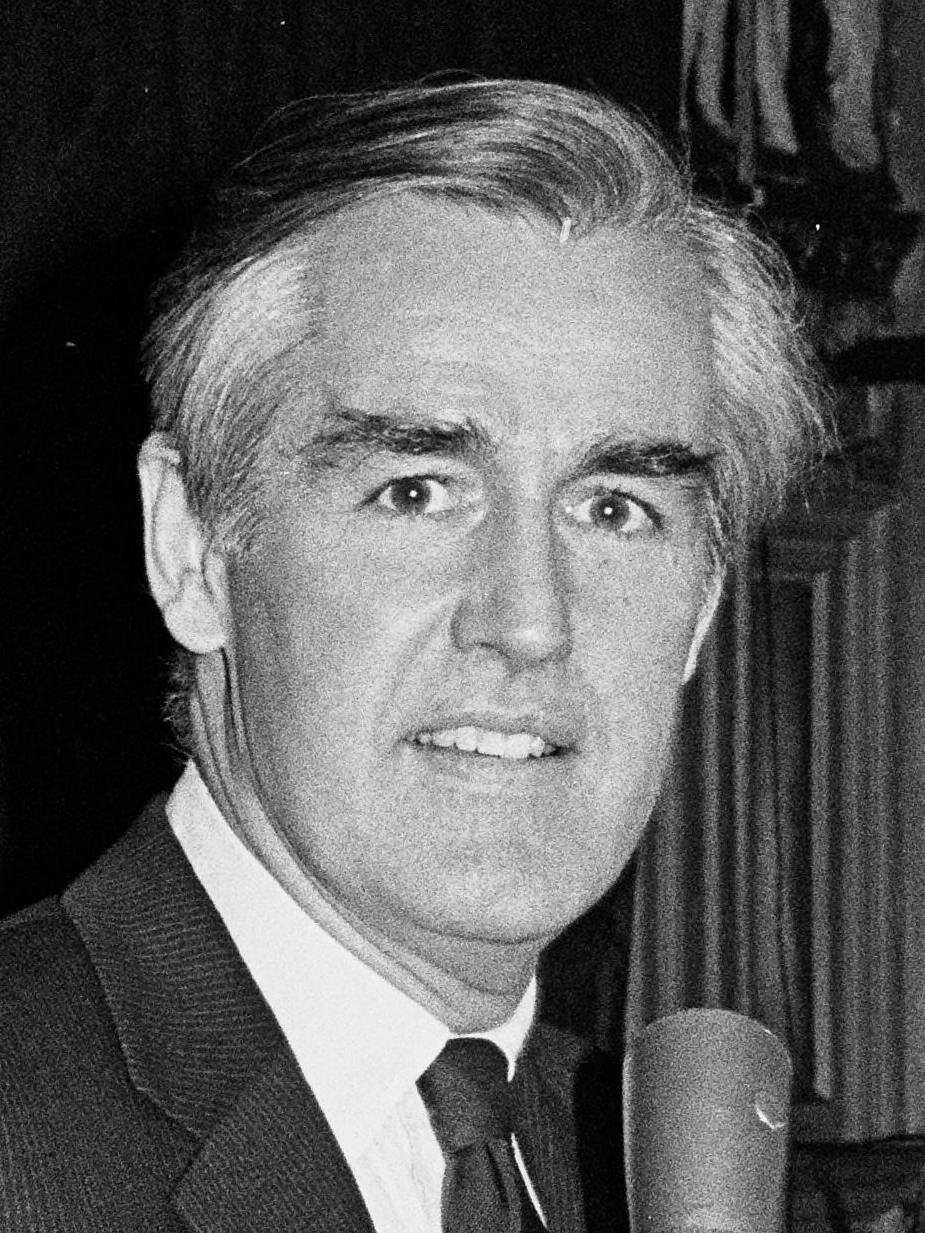
- Nickerson in 1970

Senior Judge of the United States District Court for the Eastern District of New York
- In office January 1, 1994 – January 1, 2002

Judge of the United States District Court for the Eastern District of New York
- In office October 21, 1977 – January 1, 1994
- Appointed by: Jimmy Carter
- Preceded by: Orrin Grimmell Judd
- Succeeded by: Frederic Block

County Executive of Nassau County
- In office January 1, 1962 – December 31, 1970
- Preceded by: A. Holly Patterson
- Succeeded by: Ralph G. Caso

Personal details
- Born: Eugene Hoffman Nickerson; August 2, 1918 Orange, New Jersey, U.S.
- Died: January 1, 2002 (aged 83) New York City, U.S.
- Relatives: William H. Nickerson (step-brother)
- Education: Harvard University (BA); Columbia University (LLB)

Eugene Hoffman Nickerson (August 2, 1918 – January 1, 2002) was an American lawyer. Nickerson was the only Democrat to be elected county executive in Nassau County until 2001. Later, as a United States district judge of the United States District Court for the Eastern District of New York, he presided over a challenge to the Pentagon's "Don't ask, don't tell" policy on homosexuality and the notorious Abner Louima police brutality case in New York.

Nickerson was nominated by President Jimmy Carter to the United States District Court for the Eastern District of New York on August 16, 1977 to a seat vacated by Orrin Judd. He was confirmed by the United States Senate on October 20, 1977, and received his commission on October 21, 1977. He assumed senior status on January 1, 1994, which he continued until his death on January 1, 2002.

== Early life and education ==
Nickerson was a descendant both of the Nickerson family of Cape Cod, Massachusetts, and of President John Quincy Adams. His mother, né Ruth Constance Comstock (1891–1988), was from Orange, New Jersey. She gave birth to three sons: Schuyler, Eugene and Adams. His father Hoffman Nickerson (1888–1965), a grandson of wealthy clergyman Eugene Augustus Hoffman, was an Army officer, state legislator, and historian who wrote The Turning Point of the Revolution; or, Burgoyne in America concerning the Saratoga campaign.

Born in Orange, New Jersey, Nickerson grew up in New York City and Mill Neck on Long Island. At St. Mark's School in Southborough, Massachusetts, he was quarterback of the football team and captain of the hockey team. But shortly before he entered Harvard College in 1937, Nickerson was stricken by polio. He graduated from Harvard with a Bachelor of Arts degree. In 1943, he graduated from Columbia Law School with a Bachelor of Laws, where he was an editor of the Columbia Law Review. Following graduation, he clerked for Judge Augustus Noble Hand of the United States Court of Appeals for the Second Circuit, and then for Chief Justice Harlan Fiske Stone of the United States Supreme Court from October 1944 to April 1946.

== Professional career and government service ==
He worked for Wall Street law firm Milbank, Tweed, Hope, Hadley & McCloy, then Hale, Stimson, Russell & Nickerson. From 1970 until his appointment to the bench in October 1977, Nickerson was a name partner and litigator with the firm Nickerson, Kramer, Lowenstein, Nessen, Kamin & Soll, now known as Kramer Levin Naftalis & Frankel.

=== Nassau County Executive ===
Nickerson served as Nassau County Executive in New York from January 1, 1962 to December 31, 1970. Entering politics, was the first Democrat to win a countywide seat in Nassau County, New York since 1912, when the Bull Moose Party split the Republican vote. As county executive, Nickerson was an early advocate of environmental protection, expanded Nassau County's park system, recruited college graduates for the police force, and took a progressive approach to the War on Poverty. As part of the War on Poverty effort, Nickerson increased public transit in Nassau County, supported community action programs, and attempted to create an Office of Economic Opportunity plan for the county at the end of his term which was largely rejected by the incoming Nixon administration.

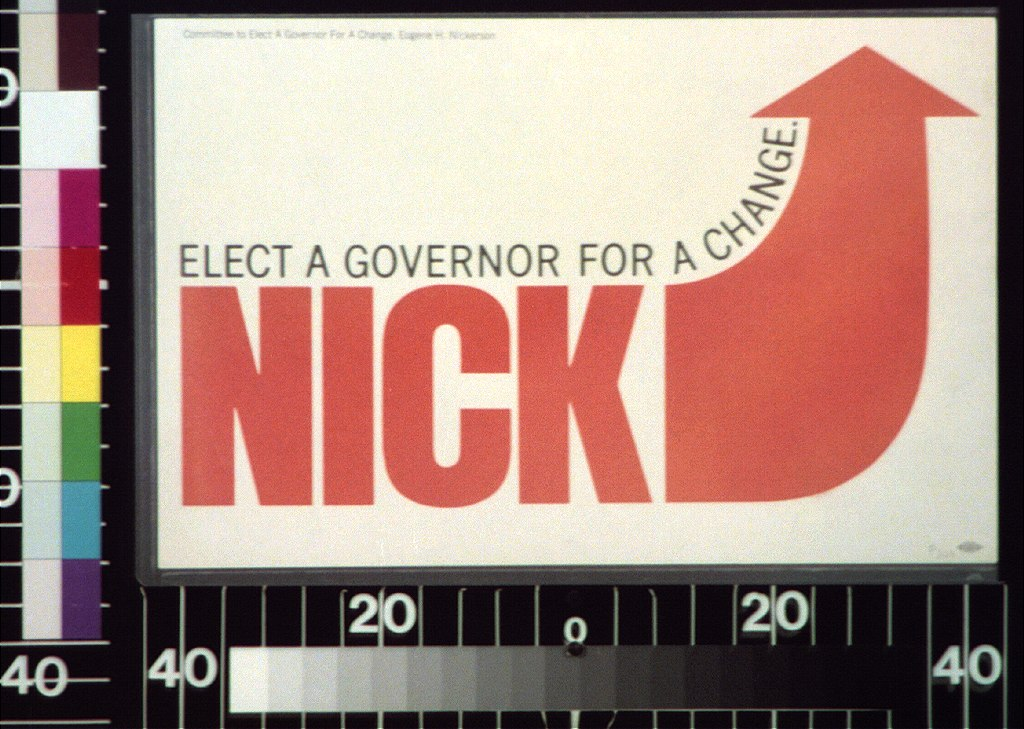
1970 poster from Nickerson's bid for governor of New York.

He later described his years as county executive as reorienting "government to concern itself with human beings and their problems." Pressed by Robert F. Kennedy, who recognized Nickerson's political talents, he ran for the United States Senate in 1968 but lost in the Democratic primary. Similarly, in 1970, he launched a failed bid for the governor of New York, withdrawing from the race early as a result of poor funding.

Nickerson was occasionally seen as an unusual member of the Democratic Party. Referring to the man who was the Democratic presidential nominee in 1952 and 1956, Nickerson once explained, "Adlai Stevenson turned me into a Democrat. I was active in his first campaign, and I stayed active. He brought in other people like myself who had intense interests about government, of ideals and principles."

=== Federal judicial service ===
Nickerson was nominated by President Jimmy Carter on August 16, 1977, to a seat on the United States District Court for the Eastern District of New York vacated by Judge Orrin Grimmell Judd. He was confirmed by the United States Senate on October 20, 1977, and received his commission on October 21, 1977. He assumed senior status on January 1, 1994, which continued until his death on January 1, 2002.

== Failed nomination to the Second Circuit ==
On August 26, 1980, President Jimmy Carter nominated Nickerson to a seat on the United States Court of Appeals for the Second Circuit to replace Judge Murray Gurfein, who had died in 1979. However, given that the nomination occurred after the unofficial Thurmond Rule governing judicial nominations during presidential election years, the Senate never took up Nickerson's nomination. President Ronald Reagan chose instead to nominate Lawrence W. Pierce to the seat in September 1981. Pierce was confirmed by the United States Senate in November 1981.

== Death ==
Nickerson died January 1, 2002, in New York City aged 83, following complications after stomach surgery.

The county-operated Nickerson Beach in Lido Beach was named in his honor by the Nassau County Legislature following his death. On August 2, 2002, Nassau County Executive Tom Suozzi dedicated a memorial for Nickerson at this park.

== See also ==
- Jimmy Carter judicial appointment controversies
- List of law clerks for the chief justice of the United States

Political offices
Preceded by A. Holly Patterson	County Executive of Nassau County, New York; 1962–1970	Succeeded by Ralph G. Caso
Legal offices
Preceded by Orrin Grimmell Judd	Judge of the United States District Court for the Eastern District of New York; 1977–1994	Succeeded by Frederic Block
