= United States District Court for the Eastern District of New York =

United States federal district court in New York (U.S. state)

Coordinates: 40°41′49″N 73°59′22″W

- (E.D.N.Y.)
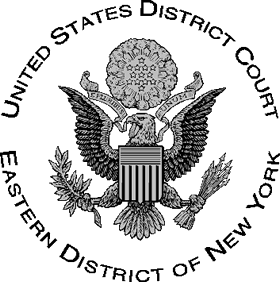

- Geographical boundaries of the district
- Location: Theodore Roosevelt Courthouse (Brooklyn) More locations: Alfonse M. D'Amato U.S. Courthouse (Central Islip)
- Appeals to: Second Circuit
- Established: February 25, 1865
- Judges: 15
- Chief Judge: Margo Kitsy Brodie

Officers of the court
- U.S. Attorney: Joseph Nocella Jr.
- U.S. Marshal: Vincent F. DeMarco
- www.nyed.uscourts.gov

The United States District Court for the Eastern District of New York (in case citations, E.D.N.Y.) is the federal district court whose territorial jurisdiction spans five counties in New York State: the four Long Island counties of Nassau, Suffolk, Kings (Brooklyn), and Queens, as well as Richmond (Staten Island), the latter three being among New York City's five boroughs. The court also has concurrent jurisdiction with the Southern District of New York over the waters of New York (Manhattan) and Bronx Counties (including New York Harbor and the East River). Its courthouses are located in Brooklyn and Central Islip.

Appeals from the Eastern District of New York are taken to the United States Court of Appeals for the Second Circuit (except for patent claims and claims against the U.S. government under the Tucker Act, which are appealed to the Federal Circuit).

The United States Attorney's Office for the Eastern District of New York represents the United States in civil and criminal litigation in the court. The United States Attorney for the Eastern District of New York since May 2025 is Joseph Nocella Jr. The U.S. Marshal for the court is Vincent F. DeMarco.

== Courthouses ==
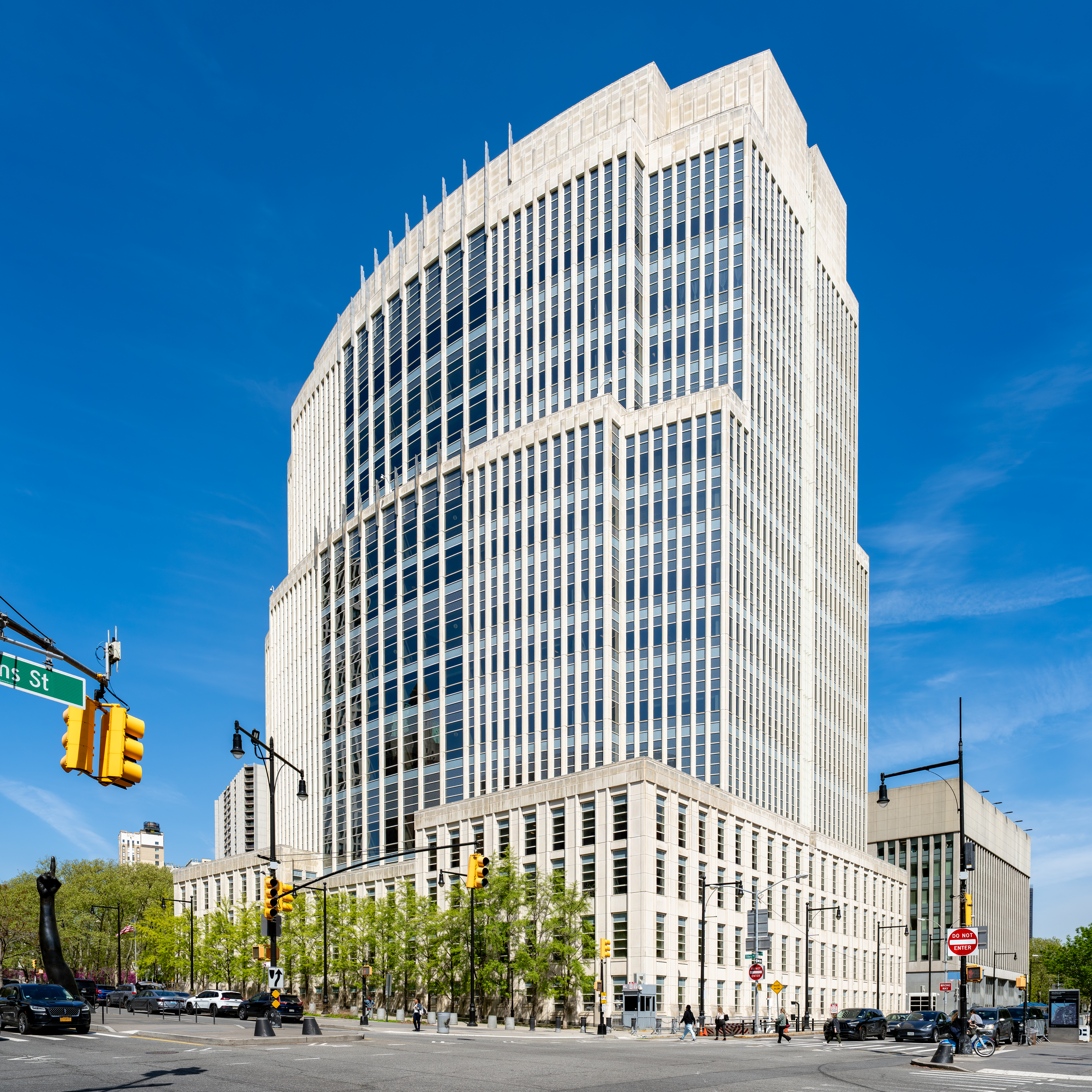
Theodore Roosevelt United States Courthouse

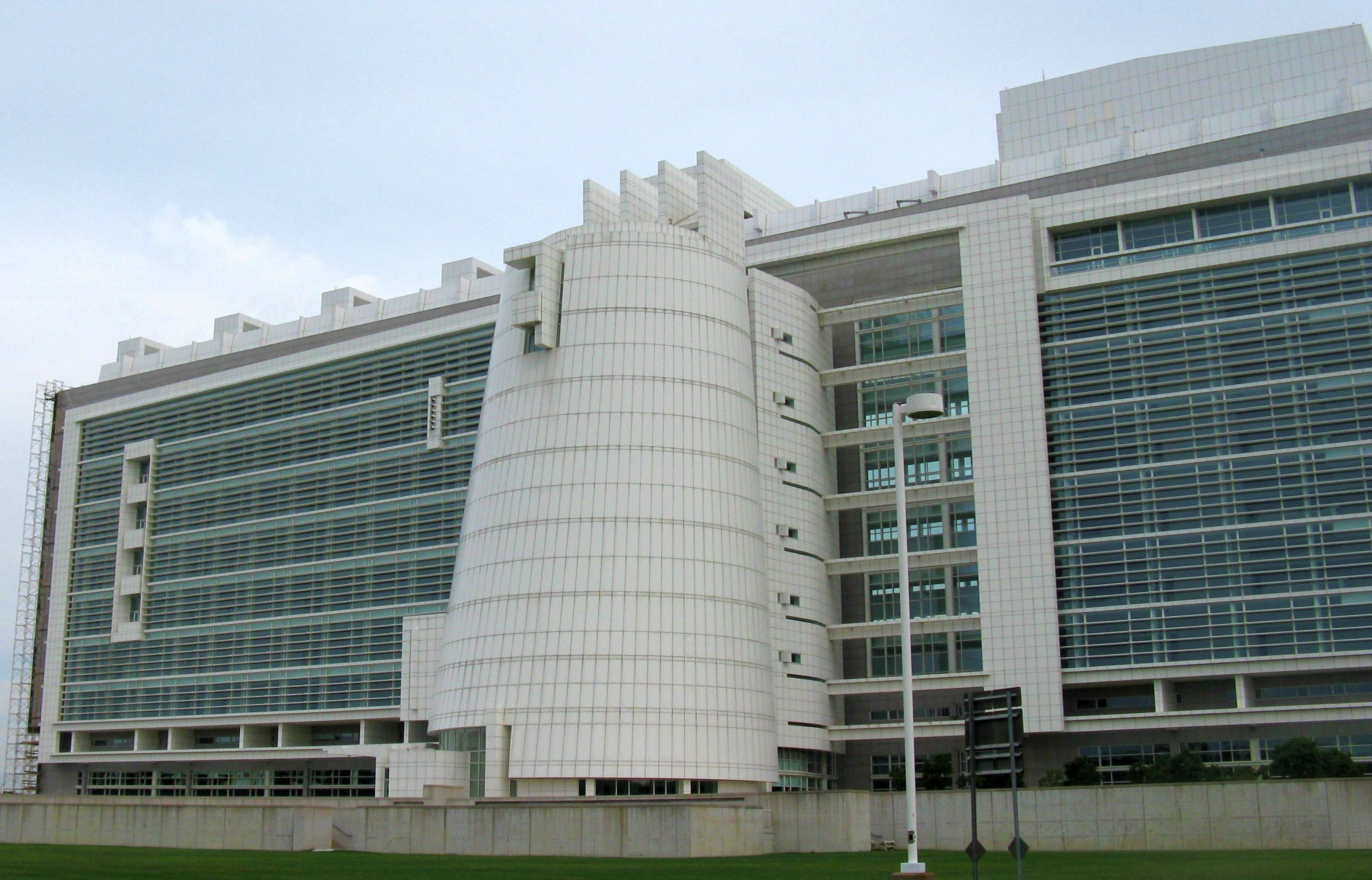
Alfonse M. D'Amato United States Courthouse

The main location is the Theodore Roosevelt United States Courthouse at 225 Cadman Plaza East in the civic center of Brooklyn. The 15-story building was designed by Cesar Pelli. The courthouse was designed in 1995 but did not open until 2006 following redesign requirements in the wake of the Oklahoma City bombing and the September 11 attacks. It replaced the six story Emanuel Celler Federal Building (built in 1962 and located next door and connected via glass atrium). In 2008 it was renamed for Theodore Roosevelt. The building was originally to be renamed in honor of former New York Governor Hugh Carey but politicians backed off because Carey was alive at the time. The associated prison is the Metropolitan Detention Center, Brooklyn.

The Divisional office is in the Alfonse M. D'Amato United States Courthouse in Central Islip, New York. The courthouse designed by Richard Meier opened in 2000 and is the largest building on Long Island. The 12-story building has 870,000 square feet (81,000 m^{2}), 23 courtrooms and 24 judges' chambers.

It is the third largest federal courthouse in the United States (after the Daniel Patrick Moynihan United States Courthouse and Thomas F. Eagleton United States Courthouse).

== Current judges ==
As of December 20, 2024:

#	Title	Judge	Duty station	Born	Term of service			Appointed by
#	Title	Judge	Duty station	Born	Active	Chief	Senior	Appointed by
58	Chief Judge	Margo Kitsy Brodie	Brooklyn	1966	2012–present	2021–present	—	Obama
59	District Judge	Pamela K. Chen	Brooklyn	1961	2013–present	—	—	Obama
61	District Judge	Ann Donnelly	Brooklyn	1959	2015–present	—	—	Obama
62	District Judge	LaShann DeArcy Hall	Brooklyn	1970	2015–present	—	—	Obama
63	District Judge	Rachel Kovner	Brooklyn	1979	2019–present	—	—	Trump
64	District Judge	Eric R. Komitee	Brooklyn	1970	2019–present	—	—	Trump
65	District Judge	Gary R. Brown	Central Islip	1963	2019–present	—	—	Trump
66	District Judge	Diane Gujarati	Brooklyn	1969	2020–present	—	—	Trump
67	District Judge	Hector Gonzalez	Brooklyn	1964	2022–present	—	—	Biden
68	District Judge	Nina Morrison	Brooklyn	1970	2022–present	—	—	Biden
69	District Judge	Orelia Merchant	Brooklyn	1971	2023–present	—	—	Biden
70	District Judge	Nusrat Choudhury	Central Islip	1976	2023–present	—	—	Biden
71	District Judge	Natasha C. Merle	Brooklyn	1983	2023–present	—	—	Biden
72	District Judge	Ramon Reyes	Brooklyn	1966	2023–present	—	—	Biden
73	District Judge	Sanket J. Bulsara	Central Islip; Brooklyn	1976	2024–present	—	—	Biden
32	Senior Judge	I. Leo Glasser	Brooklyn	1924	1981–1993	—	1993–present	Reagan
35	Senior Judge	Edward R. Korman	Brooklyn	1942	1985–2007	2000–2007	2007–present	Reagan
36	Senior Judge	Raymond Dearie	Brooklyn	1944	1986–2011	2007–2011	2011–present	Reagan
39	Senior Judge	Carol Amon	Brooklyn	1946	1990–2016	2011–2016	2016–present	G.H.W. Bush
41	Senior Judge	Denis Reagan Hurley	inactive	1937	1991–2004	—	2004–present	G.H.W. Bush
42	Senior Judge	Joanna Seybert	Central Islip	1946	1993–2014	—	2014–present	Clinton
44	Senior Judge	Frederic Block	Brooklyn	1934	1994–2005	—	2005–present	Clinton
46	Senior Judge	Allyne R. Ross	Brooklyn	1946	1994–2011	—	2011–present	Clinton
47	Senior Judge	Nina Gershon	Brooklyn	1940	1996–2008	—	2008–present	Clinton
48	Senior Judge	Nicholas Garaufis	Brooklyn	1948	2000–2014	—	2014–present	Clinton
50	Senior Judge	Dora Irizarry	Brooklyn	1955	2004–2020	2016–2020	2020–present	G.W. Bush
53	Senior Judge	Eric N. Vitaliano	Brooklyn	1948	2006–2017	—	2017–present	G.W. Bush
54	Senior Judge	Brian Cogan	Brooklyn	1954	2006–2020	—	2020–present	G.W. Bush
56	Senior Judge	Kiyo A. Matsumoto	Brooklyn	1955	2008–2022	—	2022–present	G.W. Bush
57	Senior Judge	William F. Kuntz II	Brooklyn	1950	2011–2022	—	2022–present	Obama
60	Senior Judge	Joan Azrack	Central Islip; Brooklyn	1951	2014–2024	—	2024–present	Obama

== Former judges ==
#	Judge	Born–died	Active service	Chief Judge	Senior status	Appointed by	Reason for termination
1	Charles L. Benedict	1824–1901	1865–1897	—	—	Lincoln	retirement
2	Asa Wentworth Tenney	1833–1897	1897	—	—	McKinley	death
3	Edward B. Thomas	1848–1929	1898–1906	—	—	McKinley	resignation
4	Thomas Chatfield	1871–1922	1907–1922	—	—	T. Roosevelt	death
5	Van Vechten Veeder	1867–1942	1911–1917	—	—	Taft	resignation
6	Edwin Louis Garvin	1877–1960	1918–1925	—	—	Wilson	resignation
7	Marcus Beach Campbell	1866–1944	1923–1944	—	—	Harding	death
8	Robert Alexander Inch	1873–1961	1923–1958 (Note: Recess appointment; formally nominated on December 15, 1923, confirmed by the United States Senate on January 8, 1924, and received commission the same day.)	1948–1958	1958–1961	Harding (Note: Initially appointed via recess appointment by Harding; formally nominated by and received commission from Coolidge.)	death
9	Grover M. Moscowitz	1886–1947	1925–1947	—	—	Coolidge	death
10	Clarence G. Galston	1876–1964	1929–1957	—	1957–1964	Hoover	death
11	Mortimer W. Byers	1877–1962	1929–1960	1958–1959	1960–1962	Hoover	death
12	Matthew T. Abruzzo	1889–1971	1936–1966	—	1966–1971	F. Roosevelt	death
13	Harold Maurice Kennedy	1895–1971	1944–1952	—	—	F. Roosevelt	resignation
14	Leo F. Rayfiel	1888–1978	1947–1966	—	1966–1978	Truman	death
15	Walter Bruchhausen	1892–1976	1953–1967	1959–1962	1967–1976	Eisenhower	death
16	Joseph Carmine Zavatt	1900–1985	1957–1970	1962–1969	1970–1985	Eisenhower	death
17	John Ries Bartels	1897–1997	1959–1973	—	1973–1997	Eisenhower	death
18	Jacob Mishler	1911–2004	1960–1980	1969–1980	1980–2004	Eisenhower	death
19	John Francis Dooling Jr.	1908–1981	1961–1976	—	1976–1981	Kennedy	death
20	George Rosling	1900–1973	1961–1973 (Note: Recess appointment; formally nominated on January 15, 1962, confirmed by the Senate on March 16, 1962, and received commission on March 17, 1962.)	—	—	Kennedy	death
21	Jack B. Weinstein	1921–2021	1967–1993	1980–1988	1993–2021	L. Johnson	death
22	Orrin Grimmell Judd	1906–1976	1968–1976	—	—	L. Johnson	death
23	Anthony J. Travia	1911–1993	1968–1974	—	—	L. Johnson	resignation
24	Mark Americus Costantino	1920–1990	1971–1987	—	1987–1990	Nixon	death
25	Edward Raymond Neaher	1912–1994	1971–1982	—	1982–1994	Nixon	death
26	Thomas Collier Platt Jr.	1925–2017	1974–2001	1988–1995	2001–2017	Nixon	death
27	Henry Bramwell	1919–2010	1974–1987	—	1987–2010	Ford	death
28	George C. Pratt	1928–2025	1976–1982	—	—	Ford	elevation
29	Charles Proctor Sifton	1935–2009	1977–2000	1995–2000	2000–2009	Carter	death
30	Eugene Nickerson	1918–2002	1977–1994	—	1994–2002	Carter	death
31	Joseph M. McLaughlin	1933–2013	1981–1990	—	—	Reagan	elevation
33	Frank Altimari	1928–1998	1982–1985	—	—	Reagan	elevation
34	Leonard D. Wexler	1924–2018	1983–1994	—	1994–2018	Reagan	death
37	Reena Raggi	1951–present	1987–2002	—	—	Reagan	elevation
38	Arthur Spatt	1925–2020	1989–2004	—	2004–2020	G.H.W. Bush	death
40	Sterling Johnson Jr.	1934–2022	1991–2003	—	2003–2022	G.H.W. Bush	death
43	David G. Trager	1937–2011	1993–2006	—	2006–2011	Clinton	death
45	John Gleeson	1953–present	1994–2016	—	—	Clinton	resignation
49	Sandra J. Feuerstein	1946–2021	2003–2015	—	2015–2021	G.W. Bush	death
51	Sandra L. Townes	1944–2018	2004–2015	—	2015–2018	G.W. Bush	death
52	Joseph F. Bianco	1966–present	2006–2019	—	—	G.W. Bush	elevation
55	Roslynn R. Mauskopf	1957–present	2007–2024	2020–2021	—	G.W. Bush	retirement

== Chief judges ==
Chief Judge
Inch	1948–1958
Byers	1958–1959
Bruchhausen	1959–1962
Zavatt	1962–1969
Mishler	1969–1980
Weinstein	1980–1988
Platt	1988–1995
Sifton	1995–2000
Korman	2000–2007
Dearie	2007–2011
Amon	2011–2016
Irizarry	2016–2020
Mauskopf	2020–2021
Brodie	2021–present

Chief judges have administrative responsibilities with respect to their district court. Unlike the Supreme Court, where one justice is specifically nominated to be chief, the office of chief judge rotates among the district court judges. To be chief, a judge must have been in active service on the court for at least one year, be under the age of 65, and have not previously served as chief judge.

A vacancy is filled by the judge highest in seniority among the group of qualified judges. The chief judge serves for a term of seven years, or until age 70, whichever occurs first. The age restrictions are waived if no members of the court would otherwise be qualified for the position.

When the office was created in 1948, the chief judge was the longest-serving judge who had not elected to retire, on what has since 1958 been known as senior status, or declined to serve as chief judge. After August 6, 1959, judges could not become or remain chief after turning 70 years old. The current rules have been in operation since October 1, 1982.

== Succession of seats ==
Seat 1
Seat established on February 25, 1865 by 13 Stat. 438
Benedict	1865–1897
Tenney	1897
Thomas	1898–1906
Chatfield	1907–1922
Inch	1923–1958
Bartels	1959–1973
Bramwell	1974–1987
Spatt	1989–2004
Vitaliano	2006–2017
Komitee	2019–present

Seat 2
Seat established on June 25, 1910 by 36 Stat. 838
Veeder	1911–1917
Garvin	1918–1925
Moscowitz	1925–1947
Rayfiel	1947–1966
Weinstein	1967–1993
Gleeson	1994–2016
Gujarati	2020–present

Seat 3
Seat established on September 14, 1922 by 42 Stat. 837 (temporary)
Seat made permanent on August 19, 1935 by 49 Stat. 659
Campbell	1923–1944
Kennedy	1944–1952
Bruchhausen	1953–1967
Judd	1968–1976
Nickerson	1977–1994
Block	1994–2005
Cogan	2006–2020
Gonzalez	2022–present

Seat 4
Seat established on February 28, 1929 by 45 Stat. 1409
Galston	1929–1957
Zavatt	1957–1970
Neaher	1971–1982
Altimari	1982–1985
Raggi	1987–2002
Irizarry	2004–2020
Morrison	2022–present

Seat 5
Seat established on February 28, 1929 by 45 Stat. 1409
Byers	1929–1960
Mishler	1960–1980
Glasser	1981–1993
Ross	1994–2011
Brodie	2012–present

Seat 6
Seat established on August 19, 1935 by 49 Stat. 659
Abruzzo	1936–1966
Travia	1968–1974
Pratt	1976–1982
Wexler	1983–1994
Gershon	1996–2008
Kuntz II	2011–2022
Merchant	2023–present

Seat 7
Seat established on May 19, 1961 by 75 Stat. 80
Dooling, Jr.	1961–1976
Sifton	1977–2000
Garaufis	2000–2014
Hall	2015–present

Seat 8
Seat established on May 19, 1961 by 75 Stat. 80
Rosling	1961–1973
Platt, Jr.	1974–2001
Feuerstein	2003–2015
Brown	2019–present

Seat 9
Seat established on June 2, 1970 by 84 Stat. 294
Costantino	1971–1987
Amon	1990–2016
Kovner	2019–present

Seat 10
Seat established on October 20, 1978 by 92 Stat. 1629
McLaughlin	1981–1990
Johnson, Jr.	1991–2003
Townes	2004–2015
Donnelly	2015–present

Seat 11
Seat established on July 10, 1984 by 98 Stat. 333
Korman	1985–2007
Matsumoto	2008–2022
Reyes	2023–present

Seat 12
Seat established on July 10, 1984 by 98 Stat. 333
Dearie	1986–2011
Chen	2013–present

Seat 13
Seat established on December 1, 1990 by 104 Stat. 5089
Hurley	1991–2004
Bianco	2006–2019
Choudhury	2023–present

Seat 14
Seat established on December 1, 1990 by 104 Stat. 5089
Seybert	1993–2014
Azrack	2014–2024
Bulsara	2024–present

Seat 15
Seat established on December 1, 1990 by 104 Stat. 5089
Trager	1993–2006
Mauskopf	2007–2024
Seat abolished on January 31, 2024 (temporary judgeship expired)

Seat 16
Seat established on February 1, 2021 pursuant to 104 Stat. 5089 (temporary)
Seat became permanent upon the abolition of Seat 15 on January 31, 2024
Merle	2023–present

== See also ==
- Courts of New York
- List of current United States district judges
- List of United States federal courthouses in New York
- Trump–Ukraine scandal
