= Marcus Beach Campbell =

American judge

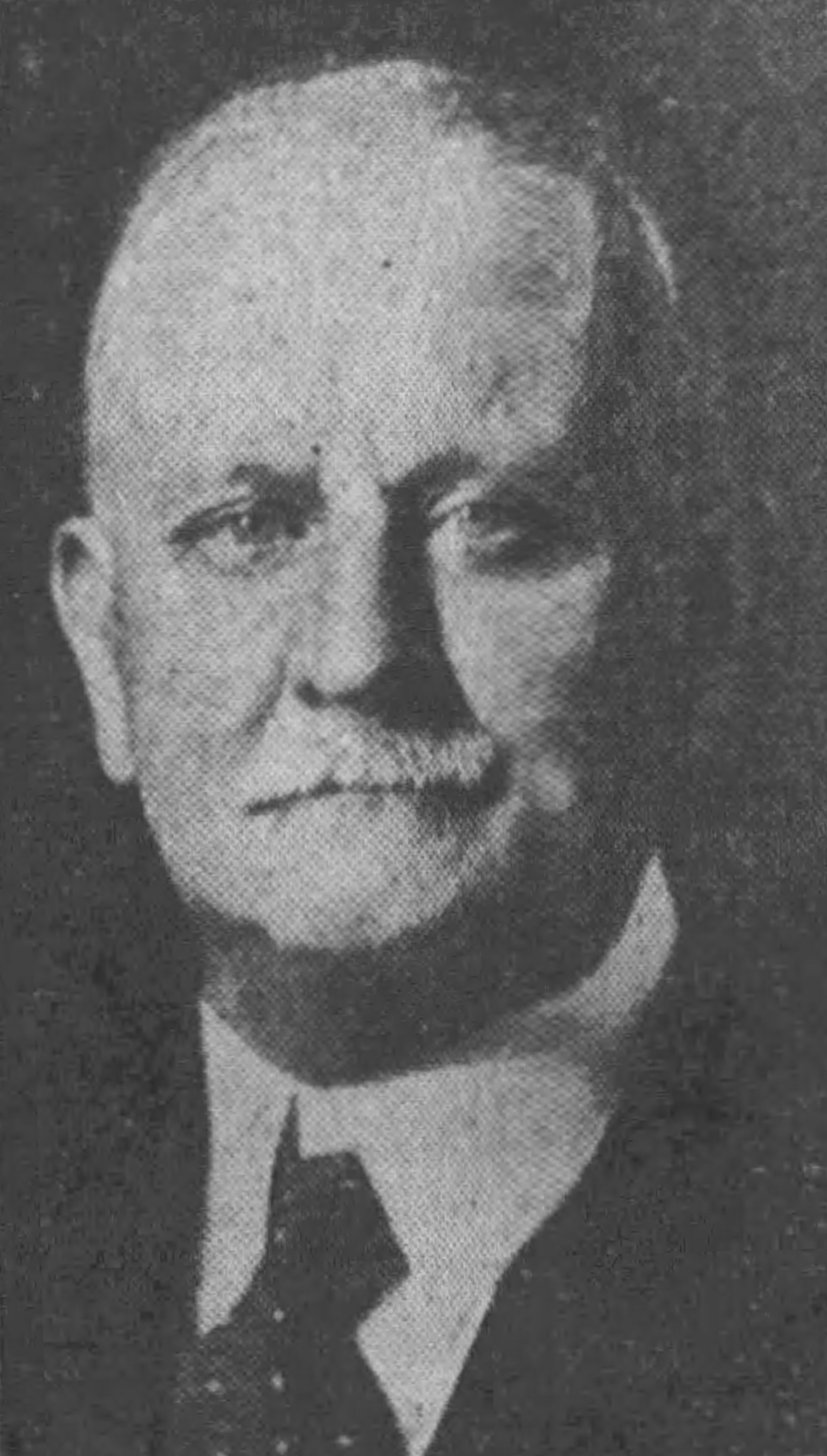

Judge of the United States District Court for the Eastern District of New York
- In office January 3, 1923 – August 3, 1944
- Appointed by: Warren G. Harding
- Preceded by: Seat established by 42 Stat. 837
- Succeeded by: Harold Maurice Kennedy

Personal details
- Born: Marcus Beach Campbell; November 18, 1866 Newark, New Jersey
- Died: August 3, 1944 (aged 77) Brooklyn, New York
- Education: New York University School of Law (LL.B.)

Marcus Beach Campbell (November 18, 1866 – August 3, 1944) was a United States district judge of the United States District Court for the Eastern District of New York.

== Education and career ==
Born in Newark, New Jersey, Campbell earned his Bachelor of Laws from New York University School of Law. He was a Judge of the Kings County Court in New York from 1918 to 1923.

== Federal judicial service ==
Campbell was nominated by President Warren G. Harding on December 28, 1922, to the United States District Court for the Eastern District of New York, to a new seat authorized by 42 Stat. 837. He was confirmed by the United States Senate on January 3, 1923, and received his commission the same day. His service terminated on August 3, 1944, due to his death in Brooklyn, New York.

== Sources ==
Legal offices
Preceded by Seat established by 42 Stat. 837	Judge of the United States District Court for the Eastern District of New York; 1923–1944	Succeeded by Harold Maurice Kennedy
