= Alfonse M. D'Amato United States Courthouse =

Federal courthouse in Central Islip, New York

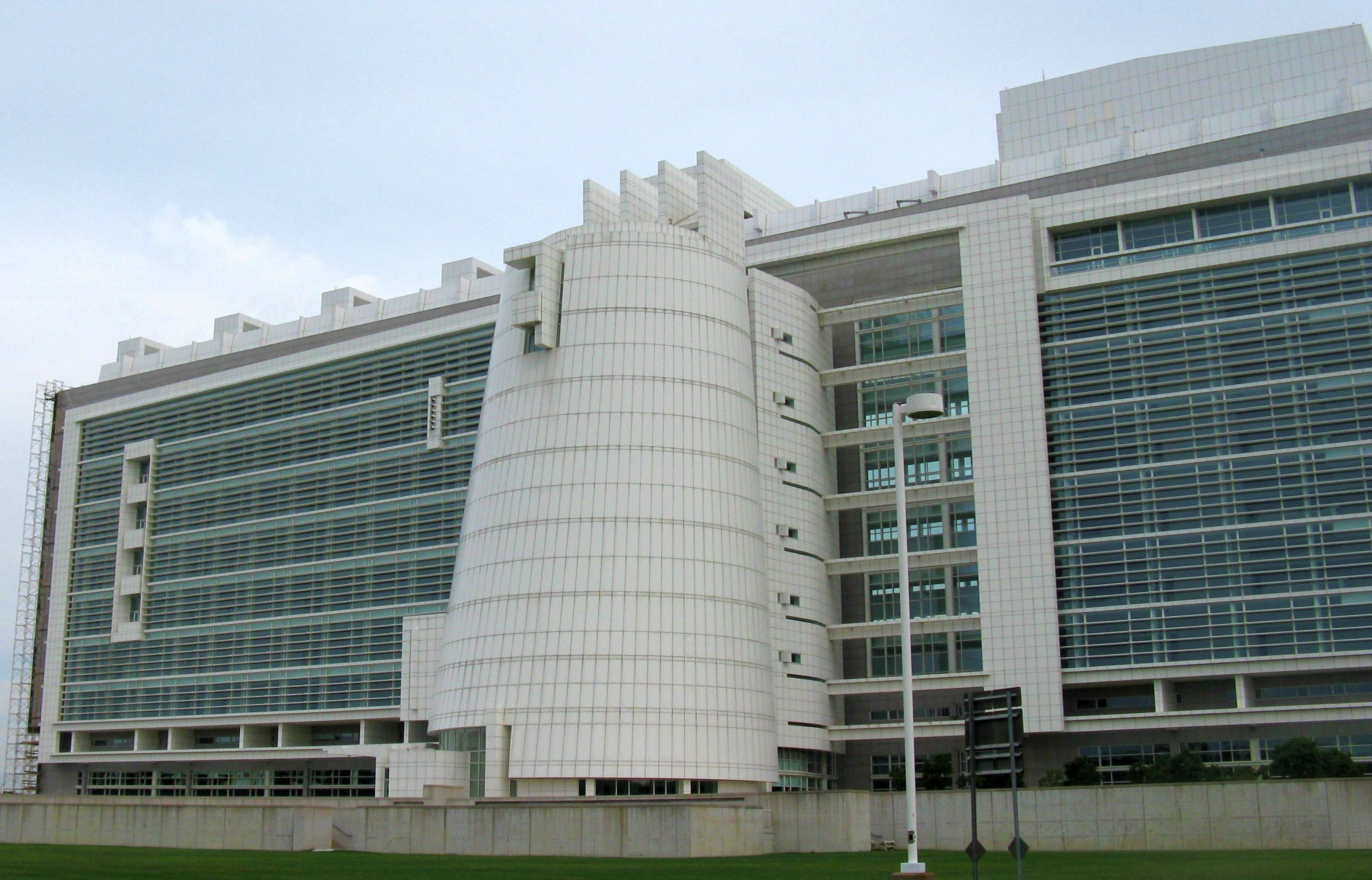
- Courthouse in 2009

General information
- Type: Court House
- Location: 100 Federal Plaza, Central Islip, New York, 11722
- Coordinates: 40.7596°N 73.1906°W
- Named for: Alfonse D'Amato
- Completed: 2000

Height
- Roof: 74.4 m Google Earth

Technical details
- Floor count: 12

Design and construction
- Architect: Richard Meier

The Alfonse M. D'Amato United States Courthouse is a federal courthouse for the United States District Court for the Eastern District of New York. It is located at 100 Federal Plaza in Central Islip on Long Island in New York. It is named after former U.S. Senator Al D'Amato of New York, a native of Long Island.

== Architecture ==
The courthouse was designed by Richard Meier. It opened in 2000 and is the third largest federal courthouse in the United States (after the Thomas F. Eagleton United States Courthouse and Daniel Patrick Moynihan United States Courthouse) and the 3rd tallest and 2nd biggest building overall on Long Island outside of New York City. The 12-story building contains 870,000 square feet (81,000 m^{2}), 23 courtrooms and 24 judge's chambers, as well as a law library. Its main entrance is via its signature conical drum. Courtrooms have two-story high ceilings, and the upper floor hallways have expansive views of the Great South Bay, Fire Island and the Atlantic Ocean.

The courthouse is one of the buildings constructed on the grounds of the former 788-acre (3.19 km^{2}) Central Islip Psychiatric Center, which was decommissioned in 1996 after its last remaining patients were relocated. Other structures on the former hospital's grounds include the New York Institute of Technology, Fairfield Properties Ballpark (home to the Long Island Ducks), Islip Town Fire Museum, Touro Law School and the Cohalan County Court Complex for Suffolk County.

== Use ==
The other courthouse for the Eastern District of New York is the Theodore Roosevelt United States Courthouse in downtown Brooklyn. This building is the first federal courthouse on Long Island outside of New York City. It replaced six leased locations in Nassau and Suffolk counties. Since June 2015, the building has also been the location of the Long Island Office of Disability Adjudication and Review, which handles appeals of Social Security Administration determinations.

The Gallery of Shorthand is located in the building's lobby immediately inside the main entrance. The educational exhibit traces the development of shorthand, stenography and court reporting from ancient times to the present in many parts of the world. On display are examples of shorthand from the ancient Middle East and China, as well as books about stenographic techniques from various countries and numerous stenotype machines from different periods and for different languages.

=== Central Islip Hold Room ===
The Central Islip Hold Room is a Immigration and Customs Enforcement detention facility located inside the courthouse. The facility include four holding rooms: two measuring 7 by 10 feet (2.1 by 3.0 m), and two measuring 8 by 10 feet (2.4 by 3.0 m). Both have toilets as part of the rooms and showers, but neither has beds. They are reportedly poorly heated, and were crowded with eight inmates in cell during the detention of Erron Anthony Clarke, whose treatment became the subject of a federal lawsuit.

Despite a prior ICE policy that detainees could stay in hold rooms no more than 12 hours, some inmates were held in the Hold Room for three days. ICE waived the 12-hour limit nationwide for twelve months on June 24, 2025.

On December 18, 2025, Federal Judge Gary R. Brown issued a ruling holding that ICE was holding immigrants in the Central Islip Hold Room "inhumanely and unlawfully" and stated that, "The evidence presented to this court, which has been largely unrebutted, demonstrates that ICE has been deploying its 'holding rooms' in a manner that shocks the conscience." In a December 23 letter in response, the Department of Homeland Security pledged to no longer hold immigrants in the facility overnight and to limit the population to two per holding room.

== Naming ==
D'Amato had sponsored legislation to build the courthouse and it was originally named the Long Island U.S. Courthouse. It was renamed for D'Amato in 2002 under a bill introduced by Representative Peter T. King which was supported in the Senate by Chuck Schumer, who had defeated D'Amato for re-election and succeeded him as senator. The renaming was controversial because D'Amato is still alive.

== See also ==
- Central Islip Hold Room
