= John Gleeson (judge) =

American judge (born 1953)

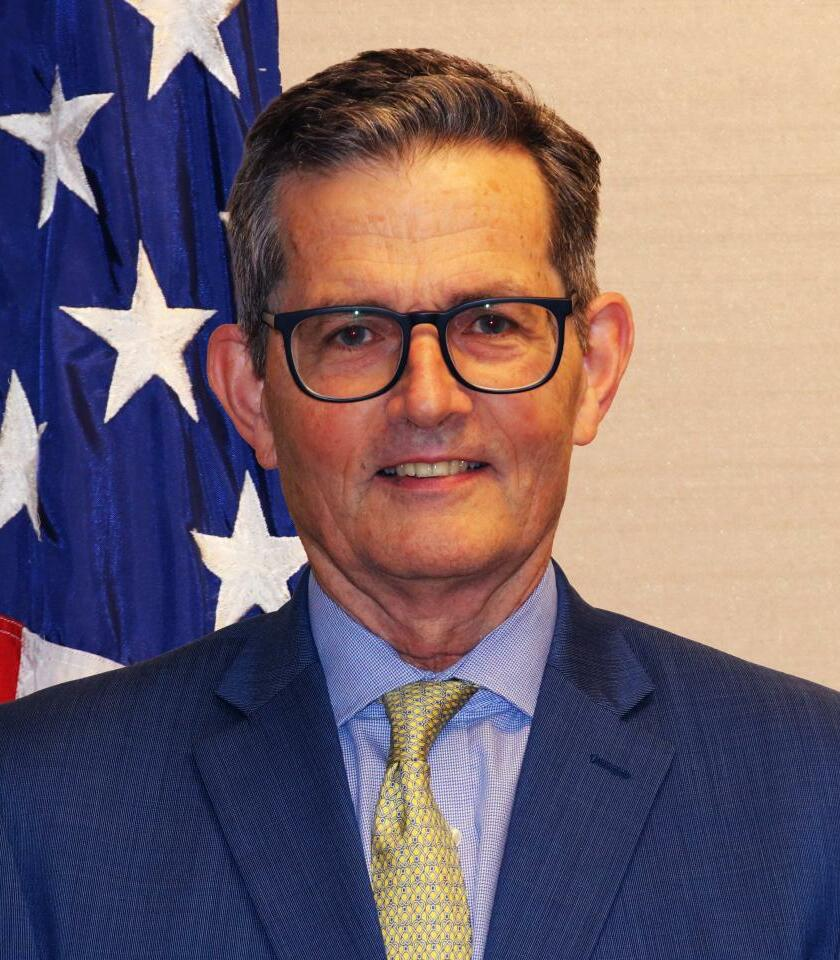
- Gleeson in 2022

Member of the United States Sentencing Commission
- In office August 5, 2022 – December 2024
- Appointed by: Joe Biden
- Preceded by: Rachel Barkow
- Succeeded by: vacant

Judge of the United States District Court for the Eastern District of New York
- In office September 29, 1994 – March 9, 2016
- Appointed by: Bill Clinton
- Preceded by: Jack B. Weinstein
- Succeeded by: Diane Gujarati

Personal details
- Born: July 14, 1953 (age 73) New York City, New York, U.S.
- Education: Georgetown University (BA); University of Virginia (JD)

John Gleeson (born July 14, 1953) is an American attorney who served as a United States district judge of the United States District Court for the Eastern District of New York. He is a member of the United States Sentencing Commission.

== Early life and education ==
Gleeson was born in the Bronx, New York. He received a Bachelor of Arts degree from Georgetown University in Washington, D.C. in 1975, and a Juris Doctor from the University of Virginia School of Law in Charlottesville in 1980.

== Career ==
Gleeson worked as a law clerk for Boyce Martin on the United States Court of Appeals for the Sixth Circuit from 1980 to 1981. He was in private practice of law at the firm of Cravath, Swaine & Moore in New York City from 1981 to 1985. He was an Assistant United States Attorney for the Eastern District of New York from 1985 to 1994 where he was noted for his prosecution of Mafia cases, most notably that of Gambino crime boss John Gotti, which resulted in Gotti's conviction.

=== Federal judicial service ===
Gleeson was nominated by President Bill Clinton on July 22, 1994, to a seat vacated by Jack B. Weinstein. He was confirmed by the United States Senate on September 28, 1994, and received his commission the next day. He served until his resignation on March 9, 2016.

As a district judge, Gleeson was a critic of harsh mandatory sentencing. Gleeson's ruling against the FBI in a landmark racial profiling case was reversed by the Supreme Court of the United States in Ashcroft v. Iqbal (2009). Judge Gleeson oversaw the prosecution of Jordan Belfort, famous as the "Wolf of Wall Street".

In 2012, he approved a deferred prosecution agreement with HSBC which was widely criticized as being too lenient, but he continued to monitor the agreement for years, in 2016 ordering reports by the bank's independent monitor to be publicly disclosed in the interest of transparency. In his last days on the bench Judge Gleeson, instead of issuing a writ of audita querela, created a new "federal certificate of rehabilitation" to help convicts find jobs.

=== Post judicial career ===
On January 4, 2016, it was announced that Gleeson planned to resign from the bench and return to private practice on March 9, 2016. He joined white shoe firm Debevoise & Plimpton to practice white-collar crime defense.

On May 11, 2020, Gleeson co-authored an op-ed concerning the Department of Justice's request to drop charges against former National Security Advisor Michael Flynn; the op-ed pointed out that dismissal of charges was not automatic but would only be granted by leave of the court. Two days later, Judge Emmet G. Sullivan appointed Gleeson to present arguments against the DOJ’s request to withdraw the case against Flynn and to determine if perjury charges should be brought against Flynn. In the role, Gleeson served as a "friend of the court."

=== United States Sentencing Commission ===
On May 11, 2022, President Joe Biden announced his intent to nominate Gleeson to serve as a member of the United States Sentencing Commission, to replace the retiring Rachel Barkow. On May 12, 2022, his nomination was sent to the Senate. On June 8, 2022, a hearing on his nomination was held before the Senate Judiciary Committee. On July 21, 2022, his nomination was reported out of committee by a voice vote, with 6 Republican senators voted “no” on record. On August 4, 2022, the United States Senate confirmed his nomination by a voice vote. On October 18, 2023, he was renominated by President Biden for an additional term. On October 24, 2023, his renomination was sent to the Senate. On April 18, 2024, his nomination was favorably reported out of committee by a 11–10 party-line vote. His nomination is pending before the United States Senate.

== Writings ==
- Alicyn Cooley, John Gleeson, David C. James, Saritha Komatireddy, Gordon Mehler (2026). Federal Criminal Practice: A Second Circuit Handbook, LexisNexis.

Legal offices
Preceded by Jack B. Weinstein	Judge of the United States District Court for the Eastern District of New York; 1994–2016	Succeeded by Diane Gujarati
