= Jacob Mishler =

American judge (1911–2004)

Senior Judge of the United States District Court for the Eastern District of New York
- In office April 30, 1980 – January 26, 2004

Chief Judge of the United States District Court for the Eastern District of New York
- In office 1969–1980
- Preceded by: Joseph Carmine Zavatt
- Succeeded by: Jack B. Weinstein

Judge of the United States District Court for the Eastern District of New York
- In office July 6, 1960 – April 30, 1980
- Appointed by: Dwight D. Eisenhower
- Preceded by: Mortimer W. Byers
- Succeeded by: I. Leo Glasser

Personal details
- Born: April 20, 1911 New York City, New York
- Died: January 26, 2004 (aged 92) West Palm Beach, Florida
- Education: New York University (B.S.); New York University School of Law (J.D.)

Jacob Mishler (April 20, 1911 – January 26, 2004) was a United States district judge of the United States District Court for the Eastern District of New York from 1960 to 2004 and its Chief Judge from 1969 to 1980.

== Education and career ==
Born in New York City, New York, Mishler received a Bachelor of Science degree from New York University in 1931. He received a Juris Doctor from New York University School of Law in 1933. He was in private practice of law in Long Island City, New York from 1934 to 1959. He was a Justice of the Supreme Court of New York in 1959. He was in private practice of law in Long Island City in 1960.

== Federal judicial service ==
Mishler was nominated by President Dwight D. Eisenhower on June 10, 1960, to a seat on the United States District Court for the Eastern District of New York vacated by Judge Mortimer W. Byers. He was confirmed by the United States Senate on July 2, 1960, and received his commission on July 6, 1960. He served as Chief Judge from 1969 to 1980. He assumed senior status on April 30, 1980. He served as a member of the Judicial Conference of the United States from 1974 to 1977. His service was terminated on January 26, 2004, due to his death in West Palm Beach, Florida.

== See also ==
- List of Jewish American jurists

Legal offices
Preceded by Mortimer W. Byers	Judge of the United States District Court for the Eastern District of New York; 1960–1980	Succeeded by I. Leo Glasser
Preceded by Joseph Carmine Zavatt	Chief Judge of the United States District Court for the Eastern District of New York; 1969–1980	Succeeded by Jack B. Weinstein
