= Pequannock =

Pequannock may refer to the following in the U.S. state of New Jersey:

- Pequannock River, a tributary of the Pompton River
- Pequannock Township, New Jersey, a township in Morris County
  - Pequannock Township School District
    - Pequannock Township High School

== See also ==
- Pequonnock River, in Connecticut
