= Pompton Dam =

Coordinates: 40°58′33″N 74°17′00″W

Photo of Pompton Dam, June 2011

The Pompton Dam is a run-of-the-river spillway constructed as part of the Morris Canal system in the Pompton Plains section of Pequannock, New Jersey, United States in the 1920s to increase land value and provide water retention by creating a backwater on the Pompton River. The structure is listed as part of the Morris Canal on the New Jersey Register of Historic Places as well as the National Register of Historic Places.

== Technical description ==
The Pompton Dam is a spillway some 250 feet (76 m) wide, located along the Pompton River north of the Pequannoc Spillway and associated guard bank in Pequannock Township's Aquatic Park. The dam is a run-of-the-river spillway, which traverses the width of the river and at normal water elevation allows water to spill over its face.

== History ==
Originally constructed in the early 19th century as a timber structure, the Pompton Dam allowed navigation upriver along the Morris Canal for nearly a century of operation. The Pompton Dam along with the Pequannoc Spillway were part of a feeder system that helped to maintain water levels along portions of the Pompton River and Ramapo River which were at the time of their construction a part of the Morris Canal.

In the 1920s, C.C. Vermeule, Decommissioning Engineer for the Morris Canal, working beneath the auspices of Dr. Henry B. Kümmel, General Manager of the Morris Canal and former New Jersey State Geologist, argued against the removal the dam on the basis that doing so would reduce the surrounding lands to a series of "ill smelling mud flats," thus devaluing the land. Instead, the State of New Jersey, which at this time owned the Morris Canal, opted to upgrade the dam to a concrete structure providing the same operation as it had previously performed.

As of 2011, the Pompton Dam is silted on the backside such that the backwater it creates is no longer navigable by boats larger than a row-boat and the spillway no longer operates as designed.

== Controversy ==
Throughout the first decade of the 21st century, representatives of a regional environmentalist faction, have demanded the removal of the Pompton Dam, based upon their unsubstantiated claim that removing the dam would improve flooding conditions in Pompton Lakes and Riverdale upstream.

Critics of these claims include representatives of townships downstream of the dam who believe that flooding to their communities would be increased with an increase in water flow and velocity with the removal of the dam, as well as historic preservationists who do not believe that the dam should be removed as it is a protected part of the Morris Canal listed in both the New Jersey Register of Historic Places and the U.S. National Register of Historic Places.

On March 11, 2012, a letter to the editor appeared in the Suburban Trends newspaper in support of restoring the Pompton Dam and Pequannoc Spillway to their 1920's new condition, providing evidence that this could help alleviate flooding conditions in the region.

On March 29, 2012, an article was published in the Suburban Trends newspaper describing concerns raised by Pequannock Township elected officials over the scheduled removal of the structure, based upon evidence presented at the March township council meeting by local resident Christopher Lotito, regarding inconsistencies in the state's planning process for the project.

On April 1, 2012, a letter to the editor appeared in the Suburban Trends newspaper disputing calls for the restoration of the dam structure under claims of drownings which may have occurred at the site as well as calling the credentials of a previously cited expert into question. This letter advocated the removal of the dam structure as a solution to flooding in the Passaic River Basin.
