= Joan Wexler =

American attorney (born 1946)

Joan Gottesman Wexler
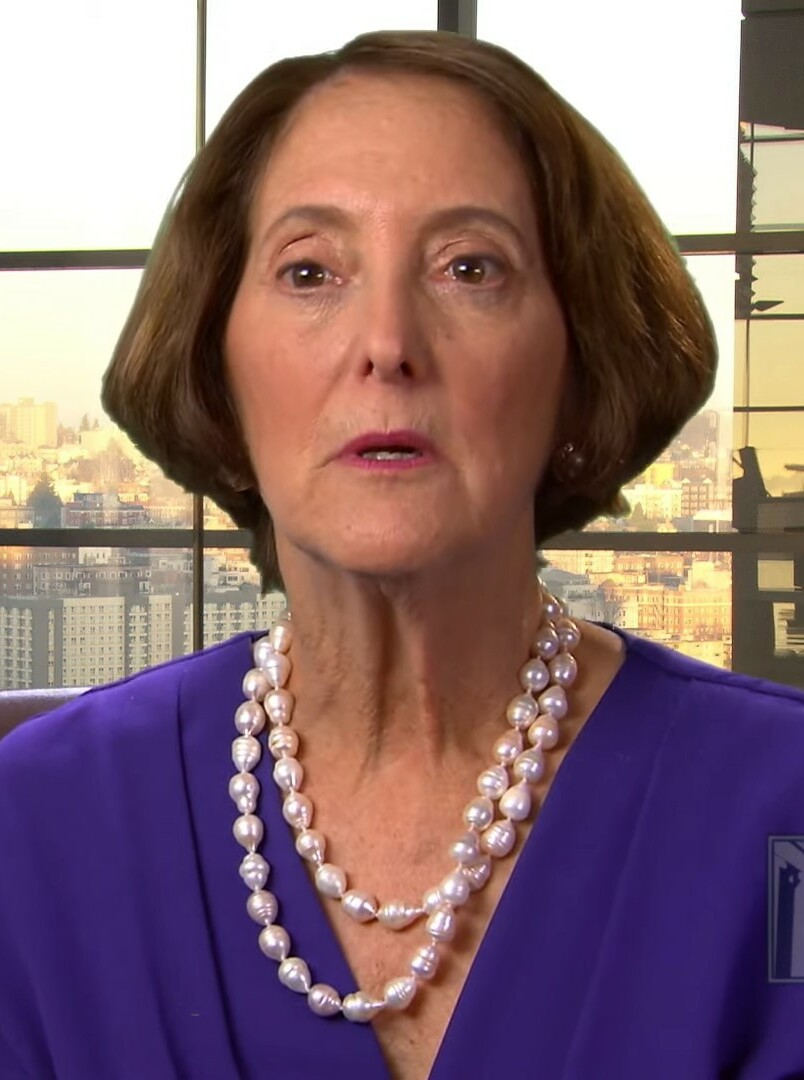
- Wexler in 2019
- Born: 1946 (age 78–79)
- Education: Cornell University (BS); Harvard University (MA); Yale University (JD)
- Known for: Dean and President of Brooklyn Law School; President of the Federal Bar Council
- Awards: Honorary Doctor of Laws degree from St. Francis College; New York Women's Bar Association's President’s Award

Joan Gottesman Wexler (born 1946) is an American attorney who is a former dean and president of Brooklyn Law School. She is also a former president of the Federal Bar Council.

== Education ==
Wexler attended Cornell University (B.S., 1968), Harvard Graduate School of Education (M.A. in Teaching, 1970), and Yale Law School (J.D., 1974), where she was articles editor of the Yale Law Journal.

== Legal career ==
Wexler was admitted to the New York Bar in 1976. She was a law clerk for Judge Jack B. Weinstein of the United States District Court for the Eastern District of New York. She was an associate at the law firm of Debevoise & Plimpton. She also taught at New York University School of Law.

Wexler joined the faculty of Brooklyn Law School in 1985, was the law school's associate dean for academic affairs for six years, and was dean of Brooklyn Law School from 1994 to 2010, and the law school's president from 2010 to 2012.

She joined the law firm of Schlam Stone & Dolan LLP as of counsel in 2016. There, Wexler focuses on litigation, corporate governance, and transactional work.

Wexler was president of the Federal Bar Council from 2004 to 2006. She was also the president of the Federal Bar Foundation from 1998 to 1999. She received the New York Women's Bar Association's President's Award in 2002.

She has published extensively in the areas of family and matrimonial law. Among her writings, Wexler authored "Husbands and Wives: The Uneasy Case for antinepotism Rules", 62 B.U. L. Rev. 75 (1982), and "Rethinking the Modification of Child Custody Decrees," 94 The Yale Law Journal 4 (March 1985).

Preceded by David G. Trager	Dean of Brooklyn Law School; 1994-2010	Succeeded by Nicholas Allard
