= Jerome Prince =

Jerome Prince may refer to:

- Jerome Prince (legal scholar), American attorney, academic administrator, and legal scholar
- Jerome Prince (politician), mayor of Gary, Indiana
