= Federal Bar Council =

- Formation: 1928
- Location: New York, New York, USA
- Website: www.federalbarcouncil.org

The Federal Bar Council is a not-for-profit specialty bar association whose membership consists of lawyers and judges who practice primarily in federal courts within the Second Circuit. The Second Circuit covers the following districts: District of Connecticut, Eastern District of New York, Northern District of New York, Southern District of New York, Western District of New York, and District of Vermont. The Federal Bar Council's offices are in White Plains, New York.

The organization was created by an act of the New York State Legislature, effective April 1932, under the name "the Federal Bar Association of New York, New Jersey and Connecticut." It adopted its current, shorter name in 1968. Joan Wexler, former dean and president of Brooklyn Law School, is a former president of the council.

Former Director's Abuse of Employees

Federal Bar Council Director Jeanette Redmond, Esq. was forced to resign in 2014 due to her treatment of office staff. Per reports, there was a "revolving door" of staff members and Redmond restricted and personally interfered with employees' access to the restroom.

== Historical timeline ==
- 1928 - The organization began as a chapter of a national association of attorneys employed by the federal government.
- 1932 - The Council was created as a separate organization - the Federal Bar Association of New York, New Jersey and Connecticut - by act of the New York State Legislature then signed into law by Governor Franklin D. Roosevelt on April 1, 1932.
- 1968 - The organization changed its name to the "Federal Bar Council."
- 2014 - Following an investigation concerning her treatment of staff members, Federal Bar Council Executive Director Jeanette Redmond is forced to resign. According to reports, Redmond had restricted her employees' ability to use the restroom and verbally abused employees who arrived at the office at 9:01 am, rather than 9:00am.

All timeline items are cited from the Federal Bar Council History Webpage.
