= Pequannoc Spillway =

Coordinates: 40°58′17″N 74°16′45″W

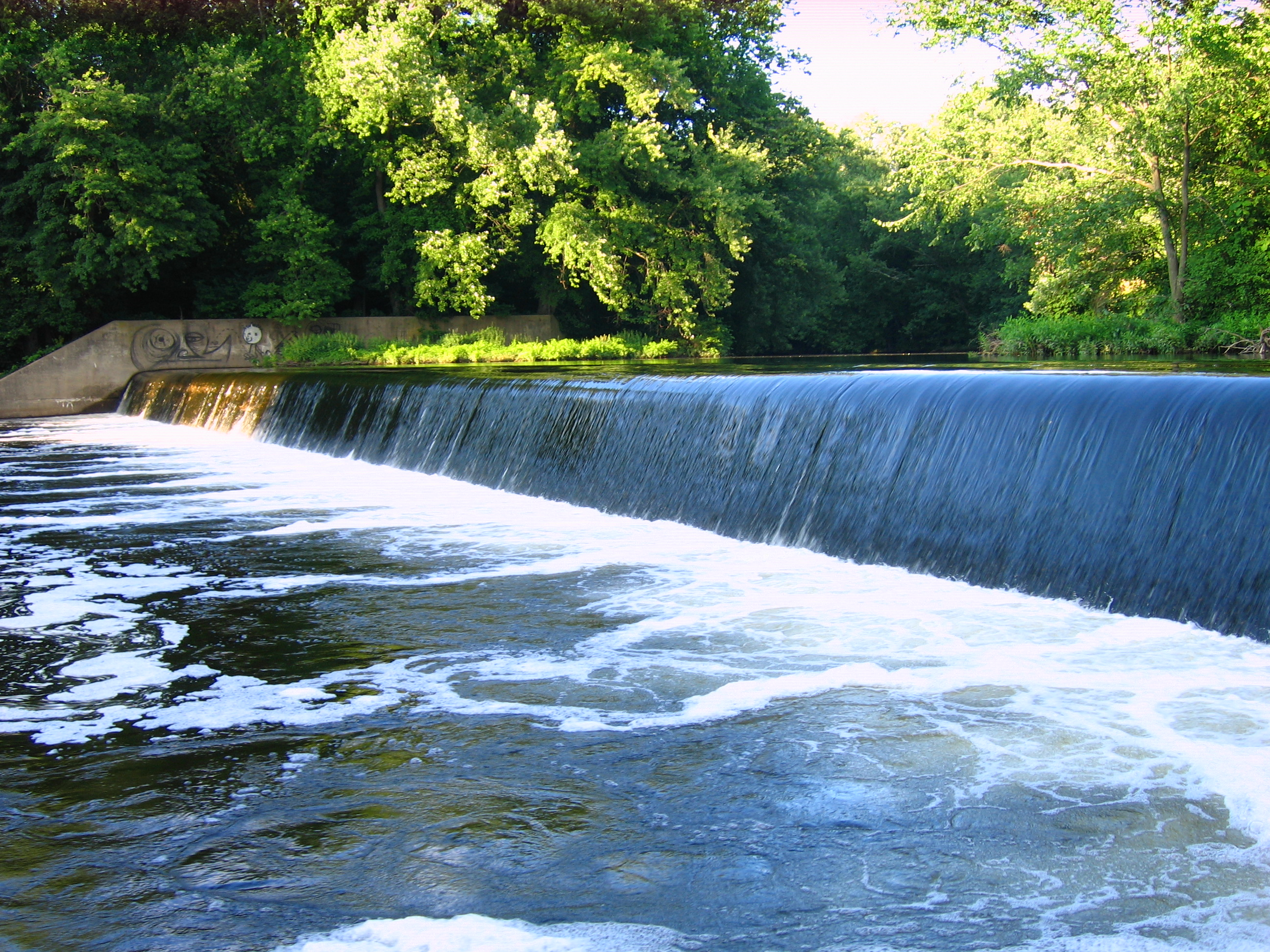
Pequannoc Spillway, June 2011

The Pequannoc Spillway is a run-of-the-river spillway constructed in the 1920s as part of the Morris Canal system in the Pompton Plains section of Pequannock, New Jersey on one bank of the river and Wayne, New Jersey on the other bank. The spillway creates usable waterfront land out of swamps and provides water retention by creating a backwater on the Ramapo River. The structure is listed as part of the Morris Canal on the New Jersey Register of Historic Places as well as the National Register of Historic Places. It is a sister structure to the Pompton dam which lies on the Pompton River.

== Technical description ==
The Pequannoc Spillway is an early 20th-century concrete spillway over 270 feet wide, equal in girth to the Great Falls of Paterson located along the Pompton River a quarter-mile south of the Pompton dam and associated guard bank in Pequannock Township's Aquatic Park. The dam is a run-of-the-river spillway, which traverses the width of the river and at normal water elevation allows water to spill over its face. The structure is 22 feet tall, though possesses only an 8-inch over 3 foot grade on the upstream side. An associated guard house sits near the site in poor repair.

== History ==
Like its sister structure the Pompton Dam, the Pequannoc Spillway was originally made entirely of timber. Constructed in the early 19th century the Pequannoc Spillway aided in navigation upriver along the Morris Canal during its almost 100 years of use. The structure was also part of a system to maintain water levels along portions of the Pompton River and Ramapo River which were at the time of their construction a part of the Morris Canal.

The removal of the spillway was advocated against in the 1920s by C.C. Vermeule, Decommissioning Engineer for the Morris Canal and Dr. Henry B. Kümmel, General Manager of the Morris Canal and former New Jersey State Geologist. Both argued that removing the structure would reduce the surrounding lands to a series of "ill smelling mud flats," noting this would devalue the adjacent lands. On Vermeule's suggestion, the State of New Jersey has upgraded the dam to a concrete structure providing the same operation as it had previously performed.

Though the Pequannoc Spillway is silted on the upstream side such that the backwater it creates is no longer navigable, the spillway still sheds water over the entirety of this face creating a regional tourist attraction.

== Controversy ==
An environmentalist group has advocated for the removal of the Pequannoc Spillway as well as the Pompton Dam, under the claims that this would reduce flooding for the upstream communities of Pompton Lakes and Riverdale. However, unlike the Pompton Dam, the Pequannoc Spillway still allows water-flow over the entirety of its girth so claims of flood hazard have gained little traction.

Representatives of townships downstream of the dam believe that flooding to their communities would be increased due to increased in water flow and velocity with the removal of the spillway, while historic preservationists do not believe that the dam should be removed as it is a protected part of the Morris Canal listed in both the New Jersey Register of Historic Places and the U.S. National Register of Historic Places.
