= Paul H. Robinson =

Member of the United States Sentencing Commission
- In office 1985 – February 1, 1988
- President: Ronald Reagan
- Preceded by: position established
- Succeeded by: Julie E. Carnes

Personal details
- Born: November 12, 1948 (age 77) Waterbury, Connecticut
- Spouse: Sarah M. Robinson
- Education: Rensselaer Polytechnic Institute (B.S.); UCLA School of Law (J.D.); Harvard Law School (L.L.M.); Faculty of Law, University of Cambridge
- Occupation: Professor

Paul H. Robinson (born November 12, 1948) is the Colin S. Diver Professor of Law at the University of Pennsylvania Law School.

== Biography ==
Robinson earned a BS from Rensselaer Polytechnic Institute in 1970, a JD from UCLA Law School in 1974, an LLM from Harvard Law School in 1974, and a Diploma in Legal Studies from Cambridge University in 1976.

In 1985 he was nominated by President Reagan to serve as a member of the newly created United States Sentencing Commission. He was later confirmed by the United States Senate and served in that position until he resigned on February 1, 1988.

Robinson is the Colin S. Diver Professor of Law at the University of Pennsylvania Law School.

He has published 17 books and many articles. He co-authored three books on criminal law with law professor and Dean of Brooklyn Law School Michael T. Cahill. Among the works that he has co-authored are Aspen Student Treatise for Criminal Law (with Michael T. Cahill, 2012), Law Without Justice: Why Criminal Law Doesn't Give People What They Deserve (with Michael T. Cahill, 2006), and the one-volume treatise Criminal Law: Case Studies and Controversies (with Michael T. Cahill and Shima Baradaran Baughman, 2016).
