= Pequannock Township, New Jersey =

Township in Morris County, New Jersey, US

- Township
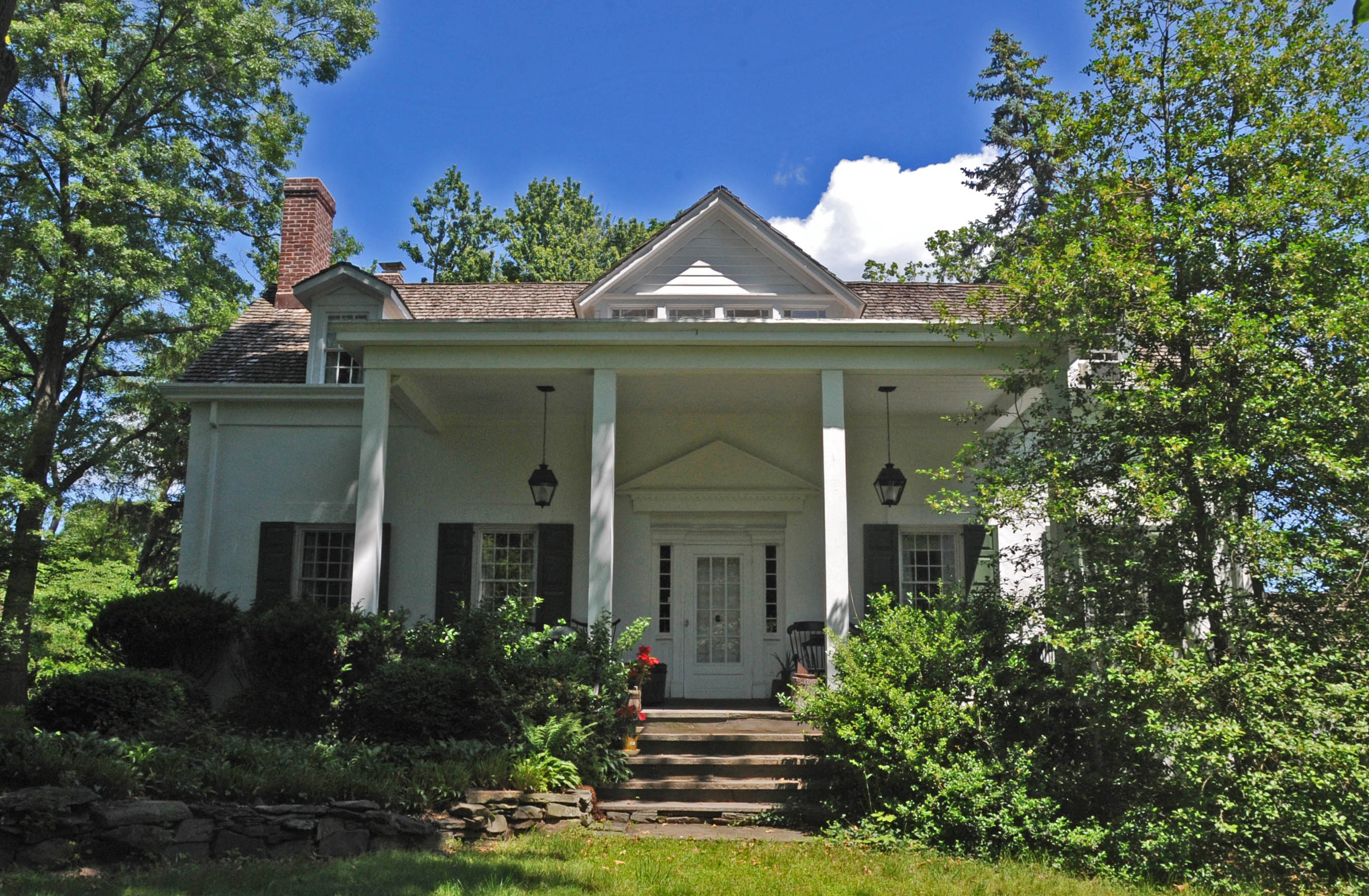
- Martin Berry House

- Coat of arms

- Location of Pequannock Township in Morris County highlighted in red (right). Inset map: Location of Morris County in New Jersey highlighted in orange (left).

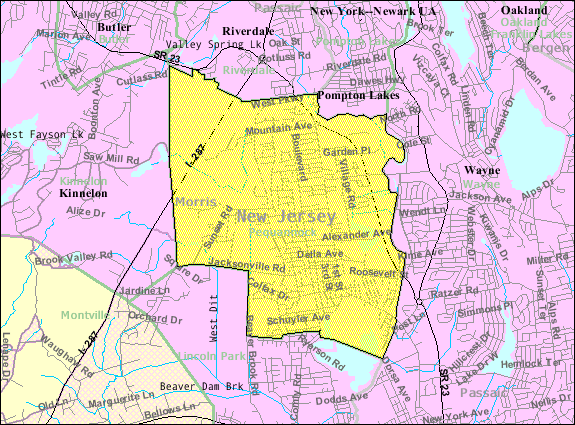
- Census Bureau map of Pequannock Township, New Jersey

- Location in Morris County Location in New Jersey Location in the United States
- Coordinates: 40.96267°N 74.305205°W
- Country: United States
- U.S. state: New Jersey
- County: Morris
- Formed: March 25, 1740 as Poquanock Township
- Incorporated: February 21, 1798 as Pequanack Township

Government
  - Type: Faulkner Act (council–manager)
  - Body: Township Council
  - Mayor: David Kohle (R, term ends December 31, 2023)
  - Manager: Adam W. Brewer
  - Municipal clerk: Carol Marsh

Area
  - Total: 7.11 sq mi (18.41 km^{2})
  - Land: 6.79 sq mi (17.58 km^{2})
  - Water: 0.32 sq mi (0.83 km^{2}) 4.53%
  - Rank: 243rd of 565 in state 21st of 39 in county
- Elevation: 203 ft (62 m)

Population (2020)
  - Total: 15,571
  - Estimate (2023): 15,603
  - Rank: 166th of 565 in state 14th of 39 in county
  - Density: 2,294.2/sq mi (885.8/km^{2})
  - Rank: 271st of 565 in state 14th of 39 in county
- Time zone: UTC−05:00 (Eastern (EST))
  - Summer (DST): UTC−04:00 (Eastern (EDT))
- ZIP Code: 07440 – Pequannock; 07444 – Pompton Plains
- Area code: 973
- FIPS code: 3402758110
- GNIS feature ID: 0882208
- Website: www.peqtwp.org

Pequannock Township (pronounced pa-QUAN-nick) is a township in Morris County, in the U.S. state of New Jersey. As of the 2020 United States census, the township's population was 15,571, an increase of 31 (+0.2%) from the 2010 census count of 15,540, which in turn reflected an increase of 1,652 (+11.9%) from the 13,888 counted in the 2000 census. The primary community in the township is the census-designated place of Pompton Plains.

The name "Pequannock", as used in the name of the township and of the Pequannock River, is thought to have been derived from the Lenni Lenape Native American word Paquettahhnuake, meaning "cleared land ready or being readied for cultivation". The name "Pompton" has been cited by some sources to mean "a place where they catch soft fish".

New Jersey Monthly ranked Pequannock Township as the "Best Bang for the Buck" in New Jersey and 9th overall in its 2011 edition of "Best Places to Live" in New Jersey. It was then ranked 14th overall in the 2013 edition of "Best Places to Live". In the 2015 edition of "Best Places to Live" in New Jersey, Pequannock ranked 4th overall.

== History ==
The name for the area goes back at least as far as March 1, 1720, when it was referred to as "Poquanick", a precinct in Hunterdon County. Formed as "Poquanock Township" on March 25, 1740, as the county's largest township, what is now a 7.1-square-mile (18 km^{2}) bedroom community with Pompton Plains in its northern portion and old Pequannock in its southern was once a vast 176-square-mile (460 km^{2}) region of rural farmland settled by the Dutch after its purchase by Arent Schuyler and associates in 1695 and 1696. The township was incorporated by the New Jersey Legislature's Township Act of 1798 as one of New Jersey's initial group of 104 townships on February 21, 1798.

Over time, several municipalities were split off from the township: Jefferson Township on February 11, 1804; Rockaway Township on April 8, 1844; Boonton Township on April 11, 1867; Montville Township on April 11, 1867; Butler Borough on March 13, 1901; Kinnelon Borough on March 21, 1922; Lincoln Park Borough on April 25, 1922; and Riverdale Borough on April 17, 1923.

During the American Revolutionary War, both Comte de Rochambeau and George Washington's troops camped on what is now the site of the Pequannock Valley Middle School. While Washington stayed at the Schuyler-Colfax House in nearby Pompton, unproven oral history states that he attended church services in the First Reformed Church located in Pompton Plains, also known as the Pompton Meeting House, which had been constructed in 1771. The Mandeville Inn, located on the site of where the soldiers had camped during the war, was built in 1788 and was once owned by Garret Hobart, later Vice President of the United States. The stone with the engraved date is now located inside the Pequannock Valley Middle School when the Inn was demolished and replaced with the school in 1950.

During the Civil War, Pequannock was a stop on the Underground Railroad. The Giles Mandeville House (also built in 1788), a field and quarry-stone structure located at 515 Newark-Pompton Turnpike, which is believed to have served as a waypoint for many runaway slaves, still stands today, and has been in use as the Manse of the adjacent First Reformed Church since 1953.

=== Historic sites ===
Historic sites located in Pequannock Township include:

- Ackerson Mead Clark House, a Greek revival mansion constructed in the 1870s.
- Bank Barn
- Giles Mandeville House
- Mandeville Inn
- Martin Berry House, a Dutch home constructed in 1720, making it Pequannock's second-oldest.
- Paul DeBow House
- Paul Barney DeBow House
- Pequannoc Spillway
- Pompton dam, constructed in 1837 to provide water for the Morris Canal.
- Pompton Plains Railroad Station was built in 1872 and offered regular passenger train service until 1966. Added to the National Register of Historic Places on March 5, 2008, the station serves as the Pequannock Township Museum.

== Geography ==
According to the United States Census Bureau, the township had a total area of 7.11 square miles (18.41 km^{2}), including 6.79 square miles (17.58 km^{2}) of land and 0.32 square miles (0.83 km^{2}) of water (4.53%).

The Township of Pequannock is located in eastern Morris County, along Route 23, approximately 5 miles (8.0 km) north of the interchange of Route 23 with Interstate 80 and U.S. Route 46. Interstate 287 crosses the northwest corner of the township, with a full interchange just north of the township in the borough of Riverdale. Pequannock Township is located 20 miles (32 km) west of New York City.

Unincorporated communities, localities and place names located partially or completely within the township include Pequannock and Pompton Plains, each of which is served by a separate post office of the United States Postal Service.

Pequannock Township borders the municipalities of Kinnelon, Lincoln Park and Riverdale in Morris County; and Pompton Lakes and Wayne in Passaic County.

== Demographics ==
Historical population
Census	Pop.	Note	%±
1810	3,853	*	—
1820	3,820		−0.9%
1830	4,355		14.0%
1840	5,190		19.2%
1850	4,126	*	−20.5%
1860	5,438		31.8%
1870	1,534	*	−71.8%
1880	2,239		46.0%
1890	2,862		27.8%
1900	3,250		13.6%
1910	1,921	*	−40.9%
1920	2,291		19.3%
1930	2,104	*	−8.2%
1940	2,856		35.7%
1950	5,254		84.0%
1960	10,553		100.9%
1970	14,350		36.0%
1980	13,776		−4.0%
1990	12,844		−6.8%
2000	13,888		8.1%
2010	15,540		11.9%
2020	15,571		0.2%
2023 (est.)	15,603		0.2%
Population sources: 1800–1920 1840; 1850–1870 1850; 1870 1880–1890; 1890–1910 1910–1930; 1940–2000 2000; 2010 2020 * = Lost territory in previous decade.

=== 2010 census ===
The 2010 United States census counted 15,540 people, 6,471 households, and 3,986 families in the township. The population density was 2,302.7 per square mile (889.1/km^{2}). There were 6,794 housing units at an average density of 1,006.7 per square mile (388.7/km^{2}). The racial makeup was 95.76% (14,881) White, 0.48% (75) Black or African American, 0.09% (14) Native American, 1.94% (302) Asian, 0.00% (0) Pacific Islander, 0.89% (138) from other races, and 0.84% (130) from two or more races. Hispanic or Latino of any race were 4.52% (703) of the population.

Of the 6,471 households, 26.2% had children under the age of 18; 52.9% were married couples living together; 6.4% had a female householder with no husband present and 38.4% were non-families. Of all households, 35.6% were made up of individuals and 25.5% had someone living alone who was 65 years of age or older. The average household size was 2.40 and the average family size was 3.18.

21.5% of the population were under the age of 18, 6.8% from 18 to 24, 19.4% from 25 to 44, 27.4% from 45 to 64, and 24.9% who were 65 years of age or older. The median age was 46.2 years. For every 100 females, the population had 85.2 males. For every 100 females ages 18 and older there were 81.3 males.

The Census Bureau's 2006–2010 American Community Survey showed that (in 2010 inflation-adjusted dollars) median household income was $84,322 (with a margin of error of +/− $4,784) and the median family income was $109,572 (+/− $9,602). Males had a median income of $77,988 (+/− $7,857) versus $50,744 (+/− $7,369) for females. The per capita income for the township was $42,016 (+/− $2,741). About 1.8% of families and 3.1% of the population were below the poverty line, including 4.7% of those under age 18 and 4.3% of those age 65 or over.

=== 2000 census ===
The 2000 United States census counted 13,888 people, 5,026 households, and 3,829 families in the township. The population density was 1,965.1 inhabitants per square mile (758.7/km^{2}). There were 5,097 housing units at an average density of 721.2 per square mile (278.5/km^{2}). The racial makeup of the township was 96.60% White, 0.30% African American, 0.12% Native American, 1.91% Asian, 0.50% from other races, and 0.58% from two or more races. Hispanic or Latino of any race were 2.94% of the population.

There were 5,026 households, out of which 35.6% had children under the age of 18 living with them, 65.5% were married couples living together, 7.8% had a female householder with no husband present, and 23.8% were non-families. 20.9% of all households were made up of individuals, and 8.8% had someone living alone who was 65 years of age or older. The average household size was 2.76 and the average family size was 3.23.

In the township the population was spread out, with 25.9% under the age of 18, 5.8% from 18 to 24, 29.6% from 25 to 44, 24.6% from 45 to 64, and 14.1% who were 65 years of age or older. The median age was 39 years. For every 100 females, there were 92.9 males. For every 100 females age 18 and over, there were 90.5 males.

The median income for a household in the township was $72,729, and the median income for a family was $84,487. Males had a median income of $61,093 versus $38,523 for females. The per capita income for the township was $31,892. About 2.5% of families and 3.0% of the population were below the poverty line, including 3.4% of those under age 18 and 4.8% of those age 65 or over.

== Government ==
=== Local government ===
Since January 1, 1956, the township has operated within the Faulkner Act, formally known as the Optional Municipal Charter Law, under the Council-Manager Plan E form of local government. The township is one of 42 municipalities (of the 564) statewide that use this form of government. The council is comprised of five members elected at-large in a partisan vote to four-year terms in office on a staggered basis, with either two or three seats coming up for election in even-numbered years as part of the November general election. At an annual reorganization meeting, the members of the council select one of their members to serve as mayor and another as deputy mayor, each serving a one-year term. The Township Council hires a Township Manager, who serves as the chief executive and administrative officer of the township.

As of 2023, Pequannock's Township Council was composed of Mayor David G. Kohle (R, term on council ends December 31, 2024; term as mayor ends 2023), Deputy Mayor Ryan Herd (R, term on council ends 2024; term as deputy mayor ends 2023), John Driesse (R, 2026), Melissa Florance-Lynch (R, 2026) and Kyle Russell (R, 2026).

In July 2021, the Township Council appointed John Driesse to fill the seat expiring in December 2022 that had been held by Richard Phelan until he resigned from office the previous month.

Ed Engelbart was named Township Historian, following a resolution passed on May 10, 2011, making him the first person to be named to this position in a decade.

=== Federal, state and county representation ===
Pequannock Township is located in the 11th Congressional District and is part of New Jersey's 26th state legislative district.

For the 119th United States Congress, New Jersey's 11th congressional district is represented by Analilia Mejia (D, Glen Ridge) who was elected in a 2026 special election to serve for the remainder of the Congress following the resignation Mikie Sherrill (D, Montclair), who was elected Governor of New Jersey in 2025. New Jersey is represented in the United States Senate by Democrats Cory Booker (Newark, term ends 2027) and Andy Kim (Moorestown, term ends 2031).

For the 2026–2027 session, the 26th legislative district of the New Jersey Legislature is represented in the State Senate by Joseph Pennacchio (R, Rockaway Township) and in the General Assembly by Brian Bergen (R, Denville Township) and Jay Webber (R, Morris Plains).

Morris County is governed by a Board of County Commissioners comprised of seven members who are elected at-large in partisan elections to three-year terms on a staggered basis, with either one or three seats up for election each year as part of the November general election. Actual day-to-day operation of departments is supervised by County Administrator Deena Leary.

As of 2026, Morris County's Commissioners (with all terms ending December 31) are Director Stephen H. Shaw (R, Mountain Lakes, 2027), Deputy Director John Krickus (R, Washington Township, 2027), Douglas Cabana (R, Boonton Township, 2028), Thomas J. Mastrangelo (R, Montville, 2028), Christine Myers (R, Harding Township, 2028), Tayfun Selen (R, Chatham Township, 2026), and Deborah Smith (R, Denville Township, 2027).

The county's constitutional officers are County Clerk Ann F. Grossi (R, Parsippany–Troy Hills, 2028), Sheriff James M. Gannon (R, Boonton Township, 2025) and Surrogate Heather Darling (R, Roxbury, 2029).

=== Politics ===
United States presidential election results for Pequannock Township 2024 2020 2016 2012 2008 2004
Year	Republican		Democratic		Third party(ies)	
Year	No.	%	No.	%	No.	%
2024	5,778	57.96%	4,062	40.75%	129	1.29%
2020	5,592	53.88%	4,644	44.75%	142	1.37%
2016	5,090	57.09%	3,540	39.70%	286	3.21%
2012	4,850	58.77%	3,326	40.31%	76	0.92%
2008	5,341	59.13%	3,608	39.94%	84	0.93%
2004	4,889	62.21%	2,925	37.22%	45	0.57%

As of March 2011, there were a total of 10,911 registered voters in Pequannock Township, of which 4,042 (37.0%) were registered as Republicans, 2,242 (20.5%) were registered as Democrats, and 4,625 (42.4%) were registered as Unaffiliated. There were 2 voters registered as Libertarians or Greens.

In the 2012 presidential election, Republican Mitt Romney received 58.8% of the vote (4,850 cast), ahead of Democrat Barack Obama with 40.3% (3,326 votes), and other candidates with 0.9% (76 votes), among the 8,309 ballots cast by the township's 11,383 registered voters (57 ballots were spoiled), for a turnout of 73.0%. In the 2008 presidential election, Republican John McCain received 58.8% of the vote (5,341 cast), ahead of Democrat Barack Obama with 39.7% (3,608 votes) and other candidates with 0.9% (84 votes), among the 9,088 ballots cast by the township's 11,236 registered voters, for a turnout of 80.9%. In the 2004 presidential election, Republican George W. Bush received 62.0% of the vote (4,889 ballots cast), outpolling Democrat John Kerry with 37.1% (2,925 votes) and other candidates with 0.4% (45 votes), among the 7,886 ballots cast by the township's 10,055 registered voters, for a turnout percentage of 78.4.

Gubernatorial election results for Pequannock Township
Year	Republican		Democratic		Third party(ies)	
Year	No.	%	No.	%	No.	%
2025	4,582	55.61%	3,634	44.11%	23	0.28%
2021	4,186	59.19%	2,850	40.30%	36	0.51%
2017	2,907	54.22%	2,371	44.23%	83	1.55%
2013	3,695	68.57%	1,612	29.91%	82	1.52%
2009	3,550	58.90%	2,008	33.32%	469	7.78%
2005	2,817	57.26%	1,986	40.37%	117	2.38%

In the 2013 gubernatorial election, Republican Chris Christie received 68.6% of the vote (3,695 cast), ahead of Democrat Barbara Buono with 29.9% (1,612 votes), and other candidates with 1.5% (82 votes), among the 5,436 ballots cast by the township's 11,301 registered voters (47 ballots were spoiled), for a turnout of 48.1%. In the 2009 gubernatorial election, Republican Chris Christie received 58.5% of the vote (3,550 ballots cast), ahead of Democrat Jon Corzine with 33.1% (2,008 votes), Independent Chris Daggett with 6.9% (420 votes) and other candidates with 0.8% (49 votes), among the 6,073 ballots cast by the township's 11,127 registered voters, yielding a 54.6% turnout.

United States Senate election results for Pequannock Township1
Year	Republican		Democratic		Third party(ies)	
Year	No.	%	No.	%	No.	%
2024	5,429	58.11%	3,788	40.55%	125	1.34%
2018	4,397	58.19%	2,966	39.25%	193	2.55%
2012	4,353	57.63%	3,122	41.33%	78	1.03%
2006	3,198	60.23%	2,025	38.14%	87	1.64%

United States Senate election results for Pequannock Township2
Year	Republican		Democratic		Third party(ies)	
Year	No.	%	No.	%	No.	%
2020	5,442	54.98%	4,353	43.98%	103	1.04%
2014	2,470	57.60%	1,768	41.23%	50	1.17%
2013	2,157	58.11%	1,534	41.33%	21	0.57%
2008	4,687	58.23%	3,235	40.19%	127	1.58%

== Education ==
The Pequannock Township School District serves public school students in pre-kindergarten through twelfth grade. As of the 2024–25 school year, the district, comprised of five schools, had an enrollment of 2,118 students and 180.8 classroom teachers (on an FTE basis), for a student–teacher ratio of 11.7:1. Schools in the district (with 2024–25 enrollment data from the National Center for Education Statistics) are Stephen J. Gerace Elementary School 334 with students in grades K–5, Hillview Elementary School 306 with students in grades K–5, North Boulevard Elementary School 326 with students in grades PreK–5, Pequannock Valley School with 476 students in grades 6–8 and Pequannock Township High School with 655 students in grades 9–12.

Holy Spirit School is a Catholic school serving pre-kindergarten through eighth grade operated under the auspices of the Roman Catholic Diocese of Paterson. In addition, there is Kolbe Immaculata School, a non-diocesan Catholic school for grades 1–8; the Netherlands Reformed Christian School (PreK–12); and Chancellor Academy, a school founded in 1983 that serves students in sixth through twelfth grades who have not succeeded in a traditional school structure.

== Transportation ==
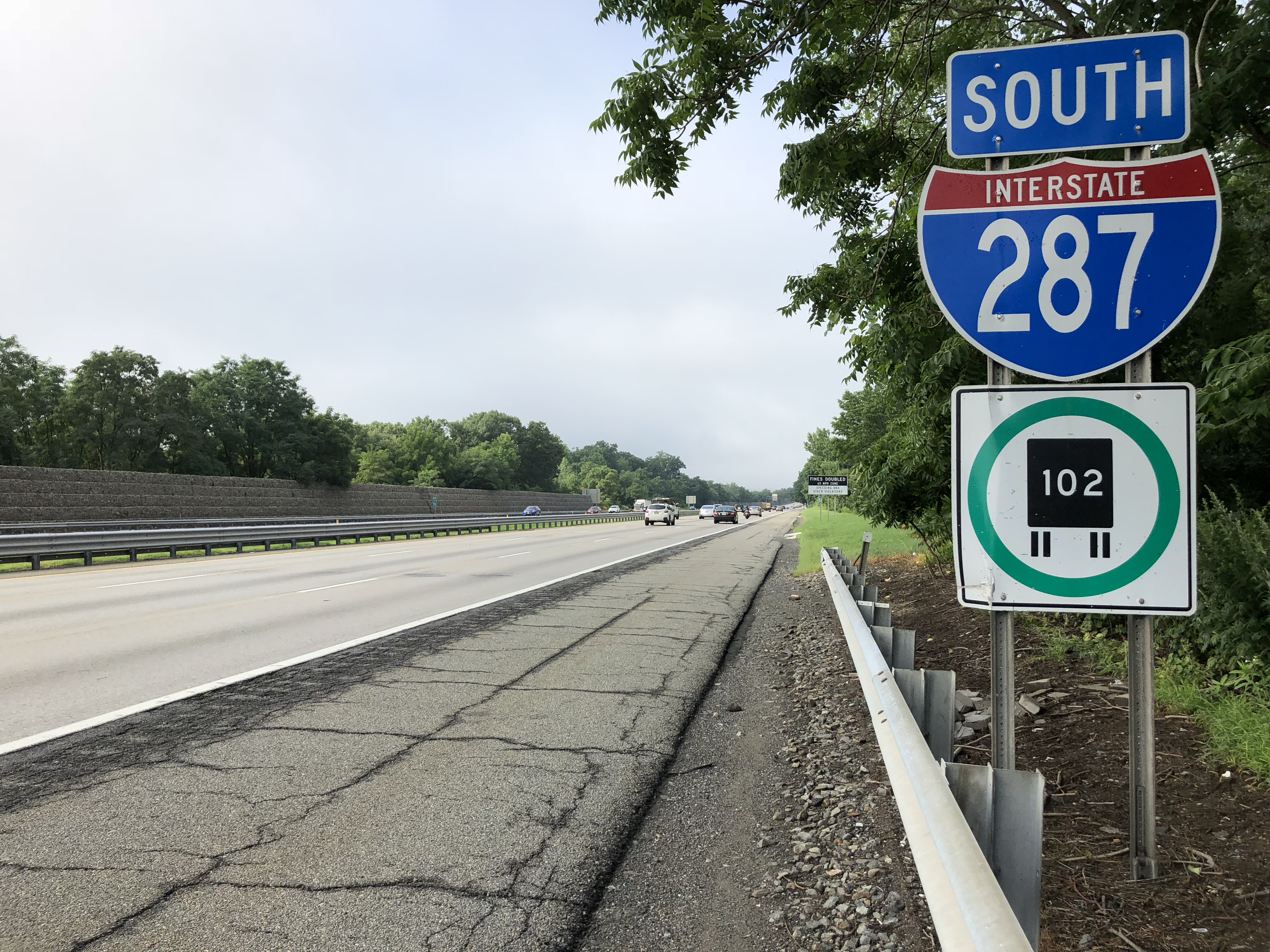
Interstate 287 southbound in Pequannock Township

=== Roads and highways ===
As of May 2010, the township had a total of 63.41 miles (102.05 km) of roadways, of which 50.67 miles (81.55 km) were maintained by the municipality, 8.54 miles (13.74 km) by Morris County and 4.20 miles (6.76 km) by the New Jersey Department of Transportation.

Two major roadways exist within the township; Interstate 287 runs for 1.4 miles (2.3 km) across the northwest corner and Route 23 runs for 2.8 miles (4.5 km) along the eastern boundary.

=== Public transportation ===
The NJ Transit Mountain View and Lincoln Park train stations are both near Pequannock, offering service on the Montclair-Boonton Line to Hoboken Terminal. Pequannock Township was formerly served by the Pompton Plains railroad station, which has been added to the National Register of Historic Places.

Bus service is provided by NJ Transit on the 194 line to the Port Authority Bus Terminal in Midtown Manhattan. In September 2012, as part of budget cuts, NJ Transit suspended service to Newark on the 75 line.

Downtown Pompton Plains is 19.8 miles (31.9 km) from Newark Liberty International Airport in Newark / Elizabeth, 14.1 miles (22.7 km) from Teterboro Airport, 13.7 miles (22.0 km) from Morristown Municipal Airport in Hanover Township, 11.5 miles (18.5 km) from Greenwood Lake Airport in West Milford, 6.6 miles (10.6 km) from Essex County Airport and 1.6 miles (2.6 km) from Lincoln Park Airport in Lincoln Park.

== Media ==
Pequannock is served by New York City TV stations. It is served by the newspapers the Daily Record and The Record of Bergen County.

== Notable people ==
People who were born in, residents of, or otherwise closely associated with Pequannock Township include:

- Don Argott (born 1972), documentary filmmaker and musician
- Jason Biggs (born 1978), actor who has appeared in the American Pie films
- Michael T. Cahill, Dean of Brooklyn Law School
- Peter Cameron (born 1959), novelist and short-story writer.
- Frank Ackerman Hill (1919–2012), military veteran and World War II fighter ace
- Derek Jeter (born 1974), former shortstop for the New York Yankees
- Danny Kass (born 1982), Olympic snowboarder
- Sibyl Kempson (born 1973), playwright and performer
- Shawn Keough (born 1959), member of the Idaho Senate
- Davana Medina (born 1974), figure competitor
- Susan Misner (born 1971), actress who has appeared on films and television, including roles in One Life to Live, The Bronx Is Burning, Rescue Me and Chicago
- French Montana (born 1984), rapper
- Criss Oliva (1963–1993), musician who was the lead guitarist and co-founder of Savatage
- Dan Prestup (born 1984), drummer
- Danielle Rose Russell (born 1999), actress who has appeared in films and on television, including roles in The Originals, Legacies and Wonder
- Pete Yorn (born 1974), singer-songwriter and musician
- Karen Young (born 1958), actress
