= Pequannock Township High School =

High school in Morris County, New Jersey, US

Location
- 85 Sunset Road; Pompton Plains, Morris County, New Jersey 07444; United States
- Coordinates: 40.961451°N 74.305991°W

Information
- Type: Public high school
- Motto: Promoting Growth Through Education
- Established: 1956
- School district: Pequannock Township School District
- NCES School ID: 341290004470
- Principal: Richard M. Hayzler
- Faculty: 64.8 FTEs
- Grades: 9-12
- Enrollment: 655 (as of 2024–25)
- Student to teacher ratio: 10.1:1
- Colors: Navy Blue and Gold
- Athletics conference: Northwest Jersey Athletic Conference (general); North Jersey Super Football Conference (football)
- Team name: Golden Panthers
- Newspaper: Panther Press
- Website: hs.pequannock.org

Pequannock Township High School is a four-year comprehensive public high school that serves students in ninth through twelfth grades from Pequannock Township in Morris County, in the U.S. state of New Jersey, operating as the lone secondary school of the Pequannock Township School District.

As of the 2024–25 school year, the school had an enrollment of 655 students and 64.8 classroom teachers (on an FTE basis), for a student–teacher ratio of 10.1:1. There were 28 students (4.3% of enrollment) eligible for free lunch and 14 (2.1% of students) eligible for reduced-cost lunch.

Advanced Placement (AP) courses are offered in AP Biology, AP Calculus AB, AP Chemistry, AP English Literature and Composition, AP European History, AP Latin: Vergil, AP Music Theory, AP Physics B, AP Spanish Language, AP Studio Art, AP United States History, AP United States Government and Politics and AP World History. Honors courses are also available for students. These include Honors Biology, Chemistry, Physics, Geometry, Algebra II, Pre-Calculus, Calculus, English I, English II, English III, English IV, World History, US History I, US History II and many others.

== History ==
In March 1955, the Board of Education began plans for a new high school for the district, after the Butler Public Schools indicated that incoming students from Pequannock Township would not be accepted at Butler High School starting in the 1955–56 school year.

Formally established in 1956, the school building had its formal dedication in January 1958.

== Awards, recognition and rankings ==
The school was the 29th-ranked public high school in New Jersey out of 339 schools statewide in New Jersey Monthly magazine's September 2014 cover story on the state's "Top Public High Schools", using a new ranking methodology. The school had been ranked 25th in the state of 328 schools in 2012, after being ranked 46th in 2010 out of 322 schools listed. The magazine ranked the school 100th in 2008 out of 316 schools. The school was ranked 78th in the magazine's September 2006 issue, which surveyed 316 schools across the state.

Schooldigger.com ranked the school tied for 31st out of 381 public high schools statewide in its 2011 rankings (an increase of 16 positions from the 2010 ranking) which were based on the combined percentage of students classified as proficient or above proficient on the mathematics (94.1%) and language arts literacy (97.9%) components of the High School Proficiency Assessment (HSPA).

U.S. News & World Report ranked the school 33rd out of all public high schools in New Jersey, and 942nd in the nation, in its 2014 edition of "America's Best High Schools".

In its listing of "America's Best High Schools 2016", the school was ranked 237th out of 500 best high schools in the country; it was ranked 40th among all high schools in New Jersey and 23rd among the state's non-magnet schools.

In 2013, PTHS was one of nine schools in the nation to have an entire class of 18 or more students attain a 5, the highest possible score, on the College Board's AP Calculus AB exam.

Out of the 175-student Class of 2005, there were ten Edward J. Bloustein Distinguished Scholars, two National Merit Scholarship Program Commended Students and 38 recipients of the President's Education Award.

== Athletics ==
The Pequannock Township High School Golden Panthers compete in the Northwest Jersey Athletic Conference, an athletic conference comprised of public and private high schools located in Morris, Sussex and Warren counties in Northwestern New Jersey, operating under the supervision of the New Jersey State Interscholastic Athletic Association (NJSIAA). Prior to the NJSIAA's 2009 realignment, the school had participated in the Suburban Division of the Northern Hills Conference, which included schools located in Essex, Morris and Passaic counties. With 520 students in grades 10–12, the school was classified by the NJSIAA for the 2019–20 school year as Group II for most athletic competition purposes, which included schools with an enrollment of 486 to 758 students in that grade range. The football team competes in the American Blue division of the North Jersey Super Football Conference, which includes 112 schools competing in 20 divisions, making it the nation's biggest football-only high school sports league. The school was classified by the NJSIAA as Group II North for football for 2024–2026, which included schools with 484 to 683 students.

The school participates in a joint cooperative ice hockey team with West Milford High School as the host school / lead agency, operating under an agreement scheduled to expire at the end of the 2023–24 school year.

Sports offered at the school include:

Fall sports: Football, Fall cheerleading, boys' and girls soccer, field hockey, cross country and girls' tennis, girls' volleyball

Winter sports: wrestling, boys' and girls' basketball, winter cheerleading, boys' and girls' swimming and ice hockey

Spring sports: Golf, boys' and girls' lacrosse, baseball, softball, boys' and girls' track and field team and boys tennis.

The field hockey team won the North II Group II state sectional championship in 1976, 1982, 1983, 1985, 1986 and 1989, won the North I Group II title in 2001 and 2003 and won the North I Group I title in 2019; the team won the Group II state championship in 1983 (defeating Collingswood High School in the tournament final) and 1985 vs. Hopewell Valley Central High School. The 1983 team won the Group II title with a 2–1 win against Collingswood in the championship game. The 1985 team finished the season with a 22–1 record after winning the Group II title after defeating Hopewell Valley in overtime by a score of 2–1 in the playoff finals.

The boys' wrestling team won the North II Group II state sectional title in 1984, 2000 and 2003, the North II Group I title in 1995 and the North I Group I title in 2005.

The baseball team won the Group II state championship in 1988 (defeating Delran High School in the finals of the tournament) and 2009 (against Shore Regional High School), and won the Group I title in 2023 (vs. Buena Regional High School). The 1988 team finished the season with a 17–10 record with a 3–0 win in the Group II final against Delran, a team that entered the championship game with a 24–2 record.

The football team won the North II Group II state sectional championship in 1999 and 2000. The team won the North II Group III sectional title in 2000 with a 21–7 win against Dover High School, overcoming an early deficit with three fourth-quarter touchdowns.

The ice hockey team won the Halvorsen Cup in 2008 and 2010.

The softball team won the Group II state title in 2009 (vs. Cranford High School) and 2012 (vs. Robbinsville High School). The 2012 team won the Group II title with a 3–0 win against defending champion Robbinsville in the playoff finals.

The golf team won the 2014 NJSIAA Group I state championship, the first state title in the program's history.

== Administration ==
The school's principal is Richard M. Hayzler. His core administration team includes the assistant principal and director of athletics.

== Notable alumni ==
- Michael T. Cahill, Dean of Brooklyn Law School.
- Susan Misner (born 1971), actress and dancer
