= William B. Carswell =

American politician

Dean William Brown Carswell
- Born: January 8, 1883; Edinburgh, Scotland
- Died: September 7, 1953 (aged 70); Sherbrooke, Quebec, Canada
- Education: Brooklyn Law School (1908)
- Known for: member of the New York State Senate; Justice of the New York Supreme Court; Dean of Brooklyn Law School
- Spouse: Charlotte E. Riegger
- Children: 2

William Brown Carswell (January 8, 1883 – September 7, 1953) was an American lawyer, member of the New York State Senate, Justice of the New York Supreme Court, and Dean of Brooklyn Law School.

== Biography ==
He was the son of David Bruce Carswell and Ann (Brown) Carswell. The family emigrated to the United States in 1887, and settled in Brooklyn. He attended public schools, graduated from Brooklyn Law School in 1908, was admitted to the bar in 1909, and practiced in Brooklyn. He married Charlotte E. Riegger (c.1898–1962), and they had two sons.

Carswell was a member of the New York State Senate (6th D.), from 1913 to 1916, sitting in the 136th, 137th, 138th and 139th New York State Legislatures.

He was Assistant Corporation Counsel of New York City for Brooklyn from 1917 to 1922. He was a justice of the New York Supreme Court (2nd D.) from 1923 until his death, and sat on the Appellate Division from 1927 on. He was also Dean of Brooklyn Law School from 1945 until his death in 1953.

He died on September 7, 1953, while on vacation in Sherbrooke, Quebec.

== Sources ==
- HYLAN ASKS MOTHER TO VOTE AGAINST SON in New York Times on November 7, 1922
- Bio at New York Court System
- MRS. W. B. CARSWELL OF BROOKLYN LAW, 64 in New York Times on September 21, 1962 (subscription required)

New York State Senate
Preceded by Eugene M. Travis	New York State Senate; 6th District; 1913–1916	Succeeded by Charles F. Murphy
Academic offices
Preceded by William P. Richardson	Dean of Brooklyn Law School; 1945–1953	Succeeded by Jerome Prince
