= Raymond Lisle =

American attorney

Dean Raymond Everett Lisle
- Born: November 28, 1910; Brooklyn
- Died: February 13, 1994 (aged 83); Freeport, New York
- Education: CCNY (B.S., 1929); Columbia University (A.M., 1930); New York University Law School (J.D., 1936)
- Employer: Brooklyn Law School
- Title: Dean of Brooklyn Law School
- Predecessor: Jerome Prince
- Successor: I. Leo Glasser

Raymond Everett Lisle (November 28, 1910, in Brooklyn – February 13, 1994) was an American attorney, officer in the United States Foreign Service, and Dean of Brooklyn Law School.

== Biography ==
Lisle attended CCNY (B.S., 1929), Columbia University (A.M., 1930) and New York University Law School (J.D., 1936). He was in the U.S. Navy, where he was a lieutenant commander, from 1941 to 45.

Lisle was a faculty member of Brooklyn Law School from 1946 to 1948.

He then joined the United States Foreign Service and was Political and Legal Adviser to and Acting United States Delegate on the United Nations Security Council Committee of Good Offices on the Indonesian Dispute. From 1949 to 1953, he served in succession in the Office of the U.S. High Commissioner for Germany at Frankfurt, and in the U.S. embassies at The Hague and Warsaw. In 1954, he became Deputy Director of the Office of Political Affairs in Bonn, Germany. In 1956 he was named Deputy Director of the Office of German Affairs. In 1960 he was Counselor and Deputy Chief of Mission in Belgrade, and in 1962 he became a Minister. From 1962 to 1965, he was Deputy Assistant Secretary of State for Public Affairs. He was then Director for Relations with Eastern Europe until 1970.

He returned to Brooklyn Law School in 1970. In 1971 he became Acting Dean, and in 1972 he became Dean of the Law School. He also taught courses in International Law, Jurisprudence, and Legal Aspects of International Business Transactions.

Lisle was Dean of Brooklyn Law School for five years. With Lisle as Dean, in 1973 the law school became a member of the Association of American Law Schools. In 1974, the Brooklyn Journal of International Law was published for the first time; it later became a leading journal in the United States. After Lisle retired as Dean, he rejoined the law school faculty, became Dean Emeritus, and taught for another 15 years.

Lisle died at his home on February 13, 1994, at the age of 83.

Preceded by Jerome Prince	Dean of Brooklyn Law School; 1971–1977	Succeeded by I. Leo Glasser
