= Schuyler–Colfax House =

Historic house in New Jersey, United States

- U.S. National Register of Historic Places
- New Jersey Register of Historic Places
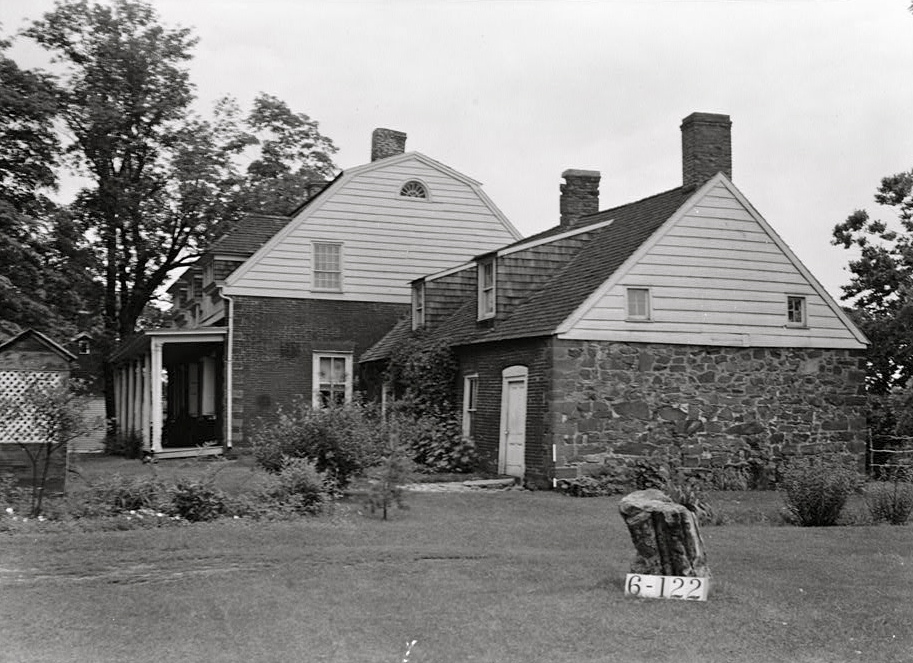
- HABS photo from 1936

- Location within Passaic County, New Jersey Location within New Jersey Location within the United States
- Location: 2343 Paterson Hamburg Turnpike; Wayne, New Jersey
- Coordinates: 40°59′15″N 74°16′47″W
- Built: c. 1695
- Architect: Captain Arent Schuyler
- Architectural style: Dutch Colonial
- NRHP reference No.: 73001133
- NJRHP No.: 2413

Significant dates
- Added to NRHP: April 3, 1973
- Designated NJRHP: September 11, 1970

The Schuyler–Colfax House is located at 2343 Paterson Hamburg Turnpike in Wayne, Passaic County, New Jersey, United States. The house was built in 1695 by Arent Schuyler. It was documented by the Historic American Buildings Survey in 1936. The house was added to the National Register of Historic Places on April 3, 1973, for its significance in architecture.

== History ==
Completed as a one-room farmhouse in 1695 by Arent Schuyler, the Schuyler homestead was passed to Arent Schuyler's great granddaughter Hester Schuyler who married William Colfax, commander of George Washington's Life Guards. Their grandson, Schuyler Colfax, Jr., was the 17th Vice President of the United States. The Dutch Colonial style addition to the originally brick and field-stone building was added by Colfax in 1783.

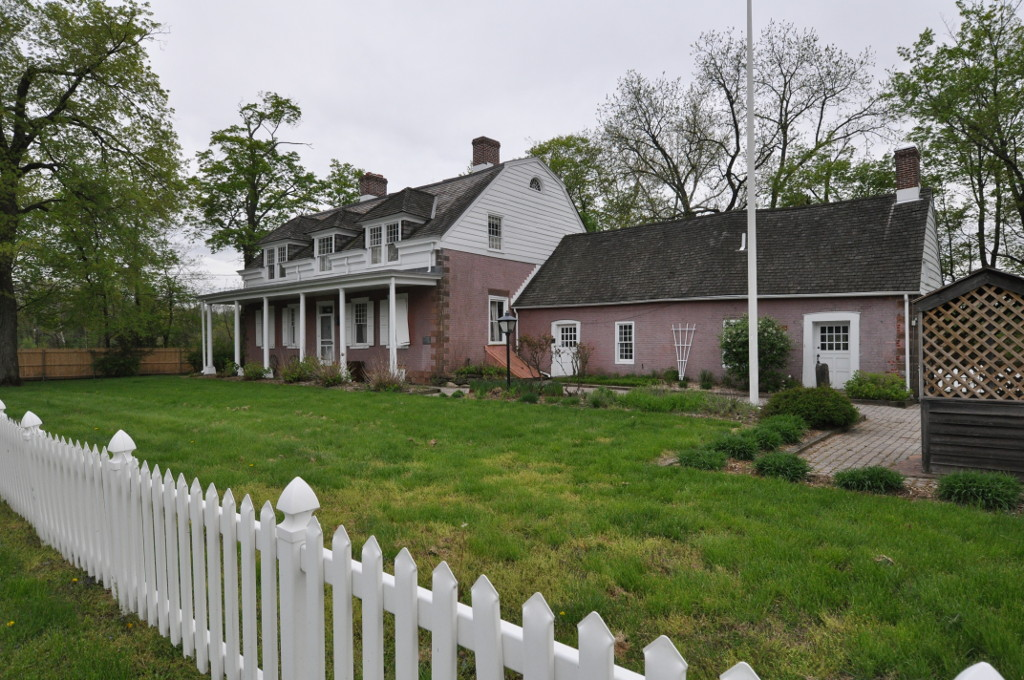
The house in 2019

Despite the 20th century alteration of the structure to add dormers in place of "belly-windows," the Schuyler–Colfax House was added to the State and National Registers of Historic Places in 1965, a decision based upon surviving historic features and the important role the Schuyler–Colfax family has played in local history.

Today, the building operates as a museum (though it is temporarily closed to the public) after having been purchased in 1994 by Wayne Township from Dr. Jane Colfax. Until then, the house had been continuously owned and lived in by the Colfax family.

== See also ==
- List of Washington's Headquarters during the Revolutionary War
- List of the oldest buildings in New Jersey
- National Register of Historic Places listings in Passaic County, New Jersey
- Martin Berry House
