= Ackerson Mead Clark House =

Coordinates: 40.972940°N 74.318599°W

- Interactive map of the Ackerson Mead Clark House area

General information
- Location: Pequannock, New Jersey, U.S.

The Ackerson Mead Clark House is a historic mansion in Pequannock, New Jersey listed on the New Jersey State Historic Register.

== History ==
Located at 183 Mountain Ave in Pequannock, NJ, the Ackerson Mead Clark House is a 21-room Greek Revival mansion built in the mid-1800s.

Although having a three-century history, the home wasn't included on the Register of Historic Sites maintained by the New Jersey Department of Environmental Protection until a decision was made on July 29, 1981. Despite extensive renovation in the early 2000s the front exterior Greek Revival colonnade, original staircase, 1870s fireplaces, and a wide variety of architectural details and moldings remain intact. Originally a plantation style structure located in an agrarian community, the property surrounding the private residence has been reduced to 1.37acres over decades of nearby development.

Currently known as "Willow Manor," the mansion was listed for sale in 2011 at a list price of $1.4 million.

The property is also considered a New Jersey Highlands Region Cultural Resource.
