= Mandeville Inn =

Coordinates: 40.961051°N 74.29448°W

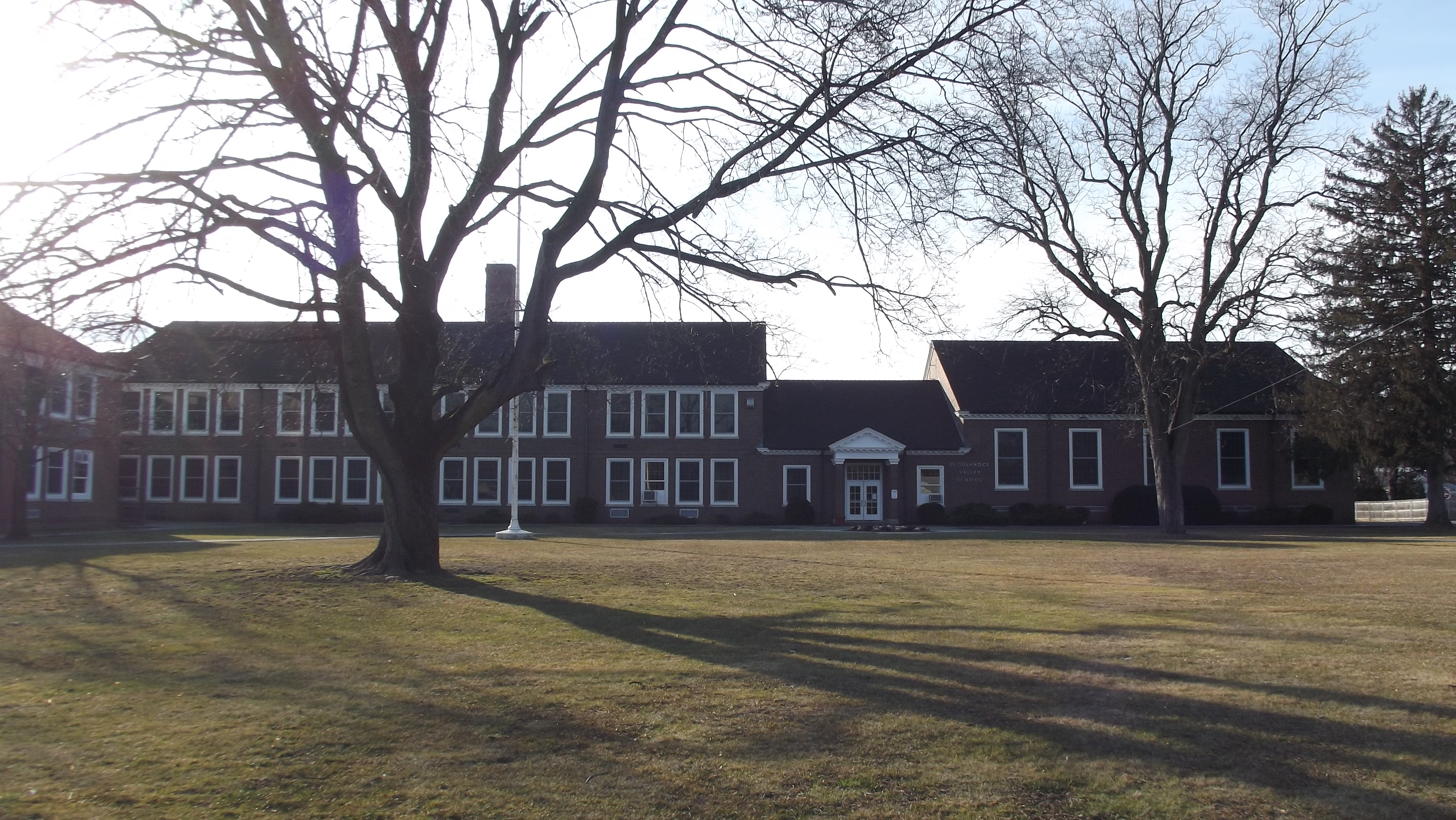
Pequannock Valley Middle School

The Mandeville Inn was a structure that stood at 493 Newark-Pompton Turnpike in Pequannock Township, New Jersey, United States. It was once owned by U.S. Vice President Garret Hobart, and is said to have been occupied by George Washington during the American Revolution.

== History ==
Initially owned by the Pequannock Mandeville family as the Mandeville Farm, the property was sold to the Roome family in approximately 1870. Garret Hobart subsequently purchased the property, prior to his term as Vice President of the United States. The property was bought by the Township of Pequannock in 1941 and the structure demolished to allow for the construction of the Pequannock Valley Middle School which sits on the site today.

== George Washington ==
It is possible that George Washington may have stayed at the property, then a residence, during the American Revolutionary War while headquartered at Morristown These claims are unconfirmed, but consistent with both Washington's movements during the war and his claimed attendance at a local church. National Archives indicate that for July 26 to 28, 1777, expenses were paid “at Mandevils for house room &c. – £2.5.".
