= Bank Barn =

Coordinates: 40.971229°N 74.320745°W

- Interactive map of the Bank Barn area

General information
- Location: 207 Mountain Avenue, Pequannock, New Jersey, U.S.

Bank Barn was item #2219 on the New Jersey State Historic Register, a timber bank barn located at 207 Mountain Avenue in Pequannock, New Jersey.

== History ==
Pequannock's Banked Barn was built of stone and timber into the foothills of the New Jersey Highlands overlooking the Pequannock Valley. The traditional banked design allows access to multiple levels within the barn from ground level on the outside, as the foundation is cut into a slope.

Located on private property, the barn fell into disrepair and finally collapsed inward in 2010. The foundation and collapsed walls remain at the site as of 2012.

The structure was added to the New Jersey Historic Register on July 29, 1981.

Since the 1970s the property has been privately owned by the Cook, Jones, and Harris families respectively. As of 2012 the property had changed hands to the McGrogan family.

== Significance ==
Bank Barn presents historic significance to the region as it was one of the few remaining structures of its kind. The barn's design demonstrated the pioneering ingenuity of early settlers who, faced with an un-plowable hillside and lack of motorized winch and lift systems, utilized the landscape to their benefit through constructing a second floor that they could simply drive up to.
