= Frank Ackerman Hill =

- Born: 20 March 1919; Nyack, New York
- Died: 5 January 2012 Birnamwood, Wisconsin, U.S.A.
- Allegiance: United States of America
- Branch: United States Army Air Corps; United States Air Force
- Rank: Colonel
- Conflicts: World War II
- Awards: Silver Star; Distinguished Flying Cross; Air Medal; Legion of Merit; Air Force Commendation Medal (5); Congressional Gold Medal (Posthumously)

Frank Ackerman Hill (March 20, 1919 – January 5, 2012) was an American veteran and World War II fighter ace who served in the U.S. Army Air Forces and the U.S. Air Force.

== Early life and education ==
Hill was born in Nyack, New York, to parents Frederick L. Hill and Ruth (née Ackerman) Hill and raised in Westwood, New Jersey and Hillsdale, New Jersey.

Hill attended Westwood Regional High School and took part in purchasing, restoring and flying a vintage Cessna glider with a group of fellow students. He graduated high school in 1937 and took an aircraft mechanic course. In September 1939, Hill enlisted in aerial photography school at Chanute Field, Illinois. Passing a two-year college equivalency exam qualified him for flight school. He joined Class Flight 40-G as a flying cadet, graduating from Kelley Field, Texas in November 1940.

== Career ==
He flew 166 combat missions during World War II, fighting in France, North Africa, Sicily, and Italy, flying British Spitfires. He became first ace of the USAAF 309th Fighter Squadron of the 31st Fighter Group in 1943, and then became the group's commander. He is credited with destroying seven enemy aircraft in aerial combat plus one more probable and five damaged.

During his 30-year career he served as the senior air instructor for the New York Air National Guard, served as director of operations at Air Defense Command in Colorado, and was commander of the 33rd Air Division in Virginia.

On November 24, 1943, upon Hill's return home from war, the people of Hillsdale turned out to honor the then-24-year-old with a hero's welcome. After Hill retired in 1969 at the rank of colonel, he moved to the Pompton Plains section of Pequannock Township, New Jersey, and ran a real estate brokerage.

== Awards ==
Hill was inducted in 1992 into the New Jersey Aviation Hall of Fame.

He was posthumously awarded a Congressional Gold Medal in 2015.

The Frank A. Hill Causeway at the Woodcliff Lake Reservoir in New Jersey was dedicated July 21, 2017. The dedication was a joint effort by Suez Water and the Borough of Hillsdale.

Hill was awarded the Silver Star, the Distinguished Flying Cross, the Air Medal with 19 Oak Leaf Clusters, the Legion of Merit with two Oak Leaf Clusters, and five Air Force Commendation Medals.

== Personal life ==
Hill married Linda Lemke and the couple had three children. Hill died at age 92 in January 2012 in Birnamwood, Wisconsin, where he lived with his wife.
