= Henry Barnard Kümmel =

American geologist (1867–1945)

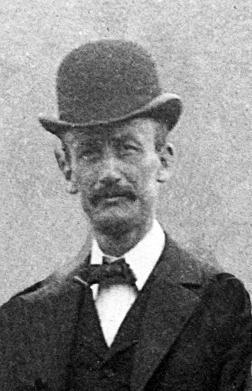
- Kümmel in 1897
- Born: May 25, 1867; Milwaukee, Wisconsin
- Died: October 23, 1945 (aged 78); Trenton, New Jersey
- Education: Beloit College, Harvard University, University of Chicago
- Awards: Fellow, Geological Society of America
- Scientific career
- Fields: geology
- Workplaces: Geological Survey of New Jersey, New Jersey Department of Conservation and Development

Henry Barnard Kümmel (1867 – October 23, 1945) was an American geologist, State Geologist for New Jersey. He worked in the management of the Morris Canal after its acquisition by the state.

== Biography ==
Kümmel was born in 1867 in Milwaukee, Wisconsin. His wife was Charlotte C. Kümmel. He studied geology under Rollin D. Salisbury at Beloit College, furthering his studies with graduate work at Harvard and the University of Chicago.

Kümmel was an elder at Prospect Street Church and sat on the judicial commission for the trial of Rev. Dr. J. Gresham Machen in 1935, but resigned his post before the conclusion of the trial.

== Career ==
On May 12, 1908, Kümmel became the founding chairman of the Association of American State Geologists (AASG) in Washington, D.C.

In the 1930s, Kümmel compiled the "Henry B. Kümmel Collection" of photographs maintained by the New Jersey State Archives, including many historically significant images of the Morris Canal.

Kümmel's work on the Morris Canal also led the way for the preservation of the Pequannoc Spillway and Pompton Dam in Pequannock, NJ through his proclamation that to remove them would reduce the surrounding area to a series of "ill smelling mud flats," a statement quoted by consulting engineer Cornelius Clarkson Vermeule II upon his decision to preserve the structures.

As New Jersey State Geologist, Kümmel contributed to a large number of reports of great historic significance to the State of New Jersey, including the annual report for 1910, reports on the decommissioning of the Morris Canal, and a report describing glacial drift cited extensively by The New York Times.

Kümmel also served as director of the Department of Conservation and Development, where on May 19, 1932, he presided over the acceptance of 2,500 plants for the George Washington Memorial Arboretum at Washington Crossing State Park from Charles Lathrop Pack and his son Arthur Newton Pack.

== Death ==
Kümmel died 23 October 1945 at home in Trenton, New Jersey, following a lengthy illness.
