= Maryellen Fullerton =

American lawyer

- Education: Duke University (BA); Antioch School of Law (JD)
- Known for: Interim Dean and Professor of Law at Brooklyn Law School; Fulbright Distinguished Chair in Law at the University of Trento

Maryellen Fullerton is an American lawyer and academic. She is a professor of law and former interim dean at Brooklyn Law School. She was the Fulbright Distinguished Chair in Law at the University of Trento for 2012-13.

== Biography ==
Fullerton earned a B.A. in 1968 at Duke University and a J.D. in 1978 at Antioch School of Law. She was a law clerk to both Judge Frank Minis Johnson (U.S. District Court for the Middle District of Alabama; 1978–79), as well as to Judge Francis Van Dusen (U.S. Court of Appeals for the Third Circuit; 1979–80). She was a Fulbright Scholar at the University of Louvain in 1986-87.

She was appointed to the Fulbright Distinguished Chair in Law at the University of Trento for the 2012-13 academic year.

Fullerton is Professor of Law at Brooklyn Law School. In May 2018, Fullerton was appointed Interim Dean of the school following the departure of Nicholas Allard. In July 2019, Fullerton was succeeded as Dean by Michael Cahill.

She co-authored Forced Migration: Law and Policy and Immigration (2013) and Citizenship Law: Process and Policy, casebooks that are used by over 100 US law schools and universities.

Preceded by Nicholas Allard	Dean of Brooklyn Law School; 2018–19	Succeeded by Michael T. Cahill
