= William P. Richardson (law school dean) =

American legal academic (1864–1945)

William Payson Richardson
- Born: November 6, 1864; Farmer Center, Ohio, US
- Died: August 29, 1945 (aged 80); Morristown, New Jersey, US
- Education: University of Wooster; Northern Indiana Normal School; University of Maryland Law School (LLB)
- Occupations: Law school dean and legal scholar
- Employer: Brooklyn Law School
- Notable work: The Law of Evidence
- Title: Dean
- Term: 1901-45
- Political party: Republican
- Spouse: Bessie Hoy
- Children: 1

William Payson Richardson (November 6, 1864 – August 29, 1945) was the co-founder and first Dean of Brooklyn Law School, a position he held for the years 1901–1945. He was also a legal scholar, and authored many books.

== Biography ==
Richardson was born in Farmer Center, Ohio, to Richard and Margaret (Powell) Richardson, and was the grandson of Thomas and Elizabeth (Orr) Richardson of Defiance County, Ohio. He studied at the University of Wooster in Ohio and the Northern Indiana Normal School in Valparaiso, Indiana, and received his law degree from the University of Maryland Law School (LL.B. 1895). He was admitted to the bar in 1895 in Maryland, and in 1901 in New York. He married Bessie Hoy in 1904, with whom he had a son. They resided in Morristown, New Jersey.

== Law school dean ==
Richardson co-founded Brooklyn Law School and was its Dean from its inception in 1901 until 1945. He led a delegation of Brooklyn Law School instructors at a meeting with other New York law school instructors in February 1910, to consider common issues of methods of study and issues relating to the bar exam. In 1928 the law school moved into a new building that was named Richardson Hall, in his honor. Richardson was Dean until he died in 1945 in Morristown, New Jersey. The William Payson Richardson Memorial Prize is awarded to an outstanding student chosen by the faculty of Brooklyn Law School.

Richardson served on the Committee on Legal Education of the New York City Bar Association.

== Legal works ==
He was a legal scholar who authored many books, including Commercial Law (1898), Richardson's Commercial Law (1904), Outlines of Contracts (1908), Outlines of Bills and Notes (1914), Principles of the Law of Contract (1920), Selected Cases in Evidence (1927), The Law of Evidence (1928), The Law of Suretyship and Guaranty (1929), The Law of Bailments, Carriers, and Innkeepers (1937). The Fifth Edition of his Law of Evidence was reviewed in 1937 by Fordham Law School Professor Maurice Wormser:

The concise but extremely practical work on Evidence by Dean William Payson Richardson ... has been regarded highly since its first appearance, both by members of the judiciary and by practicing lawyers. The present reviewer reviewed the first four editions in the columns of the New York Law Journal and emphasized the immense practical value of the treatise, particularly for attorneys practicing in New York... In using "Richardson on Evidence" students, professors and lawyers alike will be aided by the point of view of an able and thorough master of the law of Evidence, whose scholarship and erudition have been polished by the experience that is the good fortune of the active teacher.

| Preceded by none | Dean of Brooklyn Law School; 1901–1945 | Succeeded by William B. Carswell |
