= Martin Berry House =

Historic house in New Jersey, United States

- U.S. National Register of Historic Places
- New Jersey Register of Historic Places
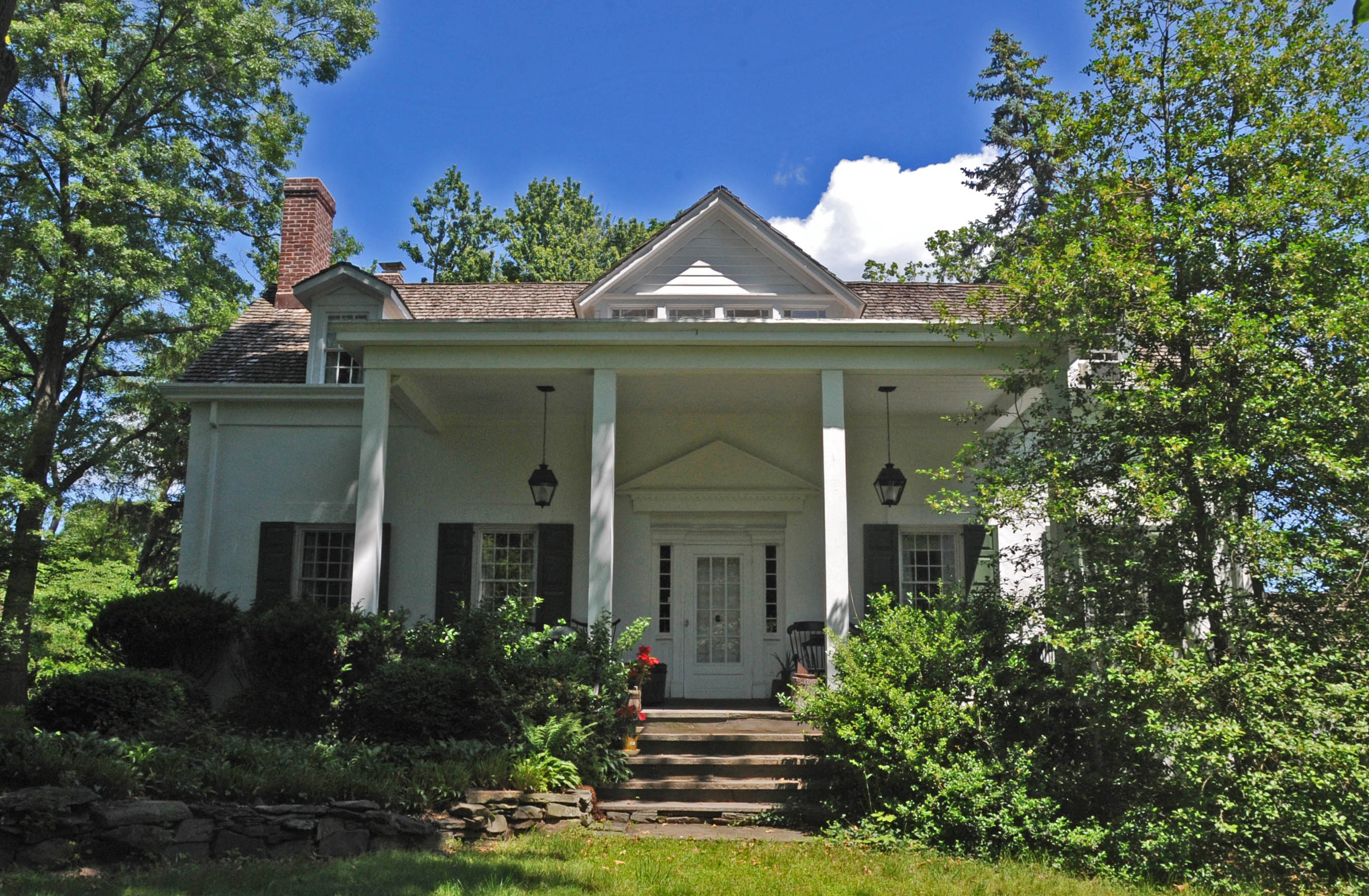

- Location within Morris County, New Jersey Location within New Jersey Location within the United States
- Location: 581 NJ 23 at Jackson Avenue, Pompton Plains, New Jersey
- Coordinates: 40°58′9″N 74°17′12″W
- Area: 2 acres (0.81 ha)
- Built: 1720
- Architectural style: Colonial, Dutch Colonial
- NRHP reference No.: 73001129
- NJRHP No.: 2220

Significant dates
- Added to NRHP: June 19, 1973
- Designated NJRHP: January 29, 1973

The Martin Berry House is located in Pompton Plains in Pequannock Township, Morris County, New Jersey, United States. The house was built in 1720 and documented by the Historic American Buildings Survey (HABS) in 1939. It was added to the National Register of Historic Places on June 19, 1973, for its significance in architecture and settlement. Built by the son of one of the first settlers to the Pompton River region, the pre-Revolutionary War building has been altered little since its construction.

Once the home of Medal of Honor recipient James R. Evans, the home was purchased by Pequannock Township for historic preservation in 2017. The Pequannock Township Historical Society, formed in 2014 and incorporated as a 501(c)(3) nonprofit in 2015, has been tasked with the maintenance of the house.

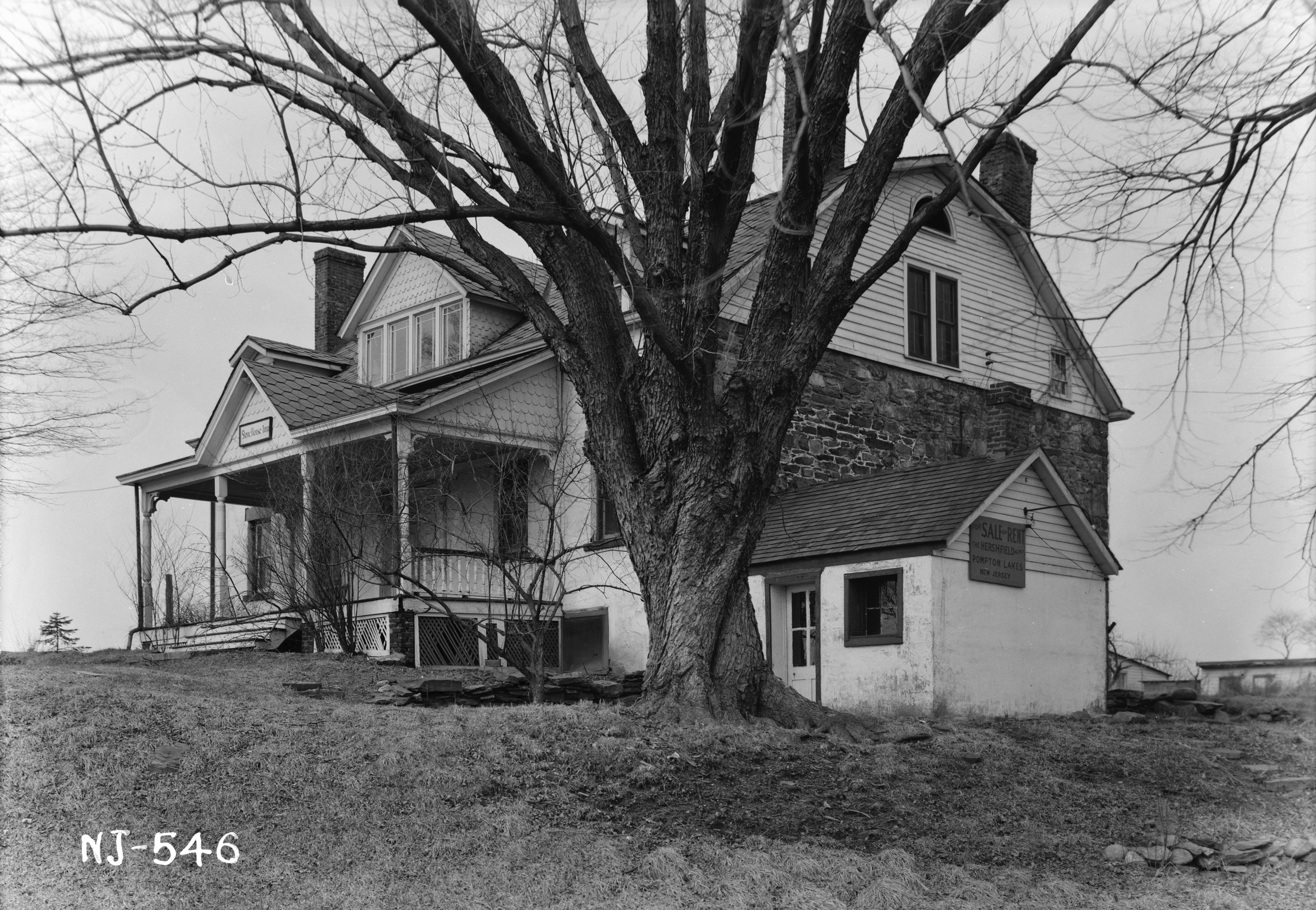
HABS photo from 1939

== See also ==
- List of the oldest buildings in New Jersey
- Arent Schuyler
- National Register of Historic Places listings in Morris County, New Jersey
