= Nicholas Allard =

American lawyer and Law School Dean

Nicholas W. Allard
- Born: October 4, 1952 (age 73)
- Education: Princeton University (BA); Merton College, Oxford (MA); Yale University (JD)
- Organization: Rhodes Trust Global Alumni Advisory Board Representative for North America (2022 - 2024)
- Known for: Eighth Dean of Brooklyn Law School and founding dean at Jacksonville University College of Law
- Awards: Rhodes Scholar

Nicholas W. Allard (born October 4, 1952) is an American attorney and founding Dean of the Jacksonville University College of Law. He is largely known for his articles surrounding the need to attract new generations of people to the legal profession by dismantling economic barriers regarding legal education, his extensive work in government affairs, and his articles surrounding the fate of the legal profession with regard to artificial intelligence.

== Biography ==
Allard grew up in Northport, Long Island, New York, and in Suffern, New York. He was inspired to go to law school when as a child he watched To Kill a Mockingbird at a drive-in movie theater. Allard graduated with an A.B. from the Woodrow Wilson School of Public and International Affairs at Princeton University in 1974 after completing a 311-page long senior thesis titled "Assessing Community Corrections: The Promise and Pitfalls of Neighborhood Residential Treatment Centers." He then studied at Merton College, University of Oxford, as a Rhodes Scholar and received an M.A. in politics, philosophy and economics in 1976. He went on to study at Yale Law School, where he received a J.D. in 1979.

Initially, Allard was a law clerk for Chief Judge Robert Francis Peckham of the U.S. District Court for the Northern District of California, and for Judge Patricia Wald of the U.S. Court of Appeals for the District of Columbia Circuit. He then worked for Senators Edward Kennedy (1983–1986) and Daniel Patrick Moynihan (1986–1987).

He then became a partner at Latham & Watkins, where he chaired the firm's Government Relations Group through 2005. Allard then served as chair of the Public Policy Department and co-chair of the Government Advocacy Practice Group at Patton Boggs.

Allard served as the eighth dean of Brooklyn Law School from 2012 to 2018, and as president from 2014 to 2018. Allard was a Professor of Law at Brooklyn Law School, and taught courses on Government Advocacy, Privacy Law in a Digital World, and Introduction to Legal Process. He also served as senior counsel in the public policy and regulation practice at Dentons law firm since 2015. In December 2018 the law school announced its intention to establish the Nicholas W. Allard Chair in Global Legal Studies, in recognition of Allard's legacy of global engagement.

He was named on the City & State 2017 “Brooklyn Influencers” list, received a top ranking in “Government Relations” by Chambers USA (from 2012 to 2015), was named one of D.C.’s “Top Lobbyists” by The Hill (from 2008 to 2013), was on the Super Lawyers list of The Washington Post (2012 to 2015), and received a Hermes Award for Contribution to Study of Communications from the Syracuse University College of Law. Allard has published scholarly articles on internet law, new media, and privacy.

In June of 2022, Allard became the founding dean of Jacksonville University College of Law. Throughout his time so far as dean, he would quickly become a prominent member of the Jacksonville legal community, being labeled as a "newsmaker" and a prominent voice on current legal affairs.

Throughout his time in the legal field, Allard has published many articles on a broad range of issues such as emerging trends in higher education, privacy law, and lobbying regulations.

Allard has also held various leadership roles within the American Bar Association, from being on the standing committee on the Law Library of Congress to being on the ABA's standing committee on government affairs.

== Notable Articles and Publications ==
- Nicholas W. Allard (Winter 2015). "A Dean Grows in Brooklyn," 46 University of Toledo Law Review 273.
- Nicholas W. Allard (March 17, 2017). "Intolerance Must Not be Tolerated," Times of Israel.
- Nicholas W. Allard (Winter 2017). "Nonsense You Say," 48 University of Toledo Law Review 189.
- Nicholas W. Allard (Winter 2019). "Love's Labors Found," 50 University of Toledo Law Review 199.
- Nick Allard (July 18, 2019). "Former Brooklyn Law School Dean Nick Allard Shares Poignant Letter to Grandson at Russian Forum," Brooklyn Daily Eagle.
- Nick Allard (October 6, 2023). "Independent, Impartial, Competent Judges are the Cornerstone of Democracy," American Bar Association Judicial Division Record.
- Nick Allard (October 6, 2025) ''Back to the Future with the Declaration of Independence," American Bar Association Judicial Division Record.
- ''250 Years of Law and Liberty," a three-part webinar organized and moderated by Nick Allard (December 2025).
- Nick Allard (2025) ''Rhodes Trust Oral History Project."

Preceded by Joan G. Wexler	Dean of Brooklyn Law School; 2012–2018	Succeeded by Maryellen Fullerton (interim)
