= New York Women's Bar Association =

The New York Women's Bar Association (NYWBA) is a non-profit organization devoted to improving the status of women in society, educating women lawyers, assisting them in professional development and advancement, and promoting the fair and equal administration of justice. The Association accomplishes these goals through the work of its committees, the presentation of continuing legal education programs, and the evaluation of judicial candidates. Through its affiliation with the Women's Bar Association of the State of New York (WBASNY), the Association also reviews and comments on proposed legislation and policy initiatives at the state, federal, and international levels that concern women and children.

== Founders ==
The New York Women's Bar Association was founded in 1934 and incorporated as a not-for-profit bar association in 1935 as a chapter of the Women’s Bar Association of the State of New York. Eleven women signed the Certificate of Incorporation: Beatrice Fliegel, Doris Silver Freeman, Lillian B. Garrell, Estelle Ruth Grollman, Margaret Fuller Karlin, Minnie Kelter (Goldberg), Lauretta Rose, Hilda G. Schwartz, Florence Perlow Shientag (Frankel), Freda Spinard (Baileson), and Rose Lehman Stein.

== History ==
The New York Women's Bar Association was formed in 1934 after several of its founders were denied membership by the New York City Bar Association. When Hilda G. Schwartz (later Judge Schwartz) applied, she was turned down and told that there were no restroom facilities for women. The 1935 Certificate of Incorporation, filed on Ms. Schwartz's blue backs, contained all of the provisions found in the City Bar's Certificate, including all of the "purpose" provisions of a full-service bar association - with a single additional provision, which reads, "To define and elevate the status of women."

The NYWBA held its first annual reception on May 25, 1936, welcoming 50 new women lawyers. The event was at the George Washington Hotel, as women were then not welcome at any bar association facilities.

In 1937, the New York City Bar Association allowed the NYWBA to hold its second reception at its building. More than 200 women gathered for a celebration for the first time in sixty-eight years when women were allowed in that facility on equal terms with men. The following May, the City Bar voted to accept women members, and then-President Stein expressed the hope that "other bar associations which still stubbornly keep out a large group of lawyers because of their sex will do likewise." Many of the association's founders were among the first group of thirteen women sworn in as City Bar members.

== Board of Directors 2022-2023 ==
The NYWBA Officers and Board of Directors, and the NYWBA Delegates to the WBASNY Board of Directors are listed below.

== NYWBA Officers 2022-2023 ==
- President: Magnolia D. Levy
- Vice President: Jocelyn L. Jacobson
- Vice President: Melissa Ephron-Mandel
- Vice President: Sabrina E. Morrissey
- Treasurer: Lissett C. Ferreira
- Recording Secretary: Vivian Rivera Drohan
- Corresponding Secretary: Morgan F. Mouchette
- Immediate Past President: Amanda B. Norejko

== NYWBA Member Serving as a WBASNY Officer ==
- WBASNY President: Deborah G. Rosenthal
