= Michael T. Cahill =

American law professor

Michael Cahill
- Education: Yale University (BA); University of Michigan (JD, MPP)
- Employer: Brooklyn Law School
- Title: Professor of Law
- Predecessor: Maryellen Fullerton (interim)
- Children: 2

Michael T. Cahill is an American legal scholar who is a Professor of Law at Brooklyn Law School. He was also the former co-Dean of Rutgers Law School.

== Early life and education ==
Raised in Pompton Plains, New Jersey, Cahill graduated from Pequannock Township High School.

Cahill received a B.A. with distinction in Ethics, Politics & Economics from Yale University in 1993. He received his J.D., magna cum laude, in 1999 from the University of Michigan Law School, and also received a master of public policy (M.P.P.) degree in 1999 from the University of Michigan School of Public Policy. In law school, he served as a note editor for the Michigan Law Review and was given a Bodman-Longley Award for 1996-1997, "in recognition of [his] "superior scholastic record" and [his] contributions to the Michigan Law Review." He then served as a law clerk to Judge James B. Loken of the U.S. Court of Appeals for the Eighth Circuit from 1999 to 2000.

== Career ==
He taught at Chicago-Kent College of Law as a visiting assistant professor of law from 2002 to 2003.

Cahill taught and worked at Brooklyn Law School from 2003 until 2016, serving as Associate Dean for Academic Affairs from 2010 to 2013 and as Vice Dean from 2013 to 2015. Over that time, Cahill was involved in nearly every aspect of the school’s operation, including curricular oversight and reform, support for faculty research, admissions and financial-aid policy, budgetary planning, supervision of administrators and staff, maintenance and improvement of Law School facilities, external relations, and fundraising.

He served as co-dean and professor at Rutgers Law School from 2016 to 2019, taking the post at 44 years of age.

Cahill returned to Brooklyn Law School in 2019 to become President and Joseph Crea Dean, as well as a tenured Professor of Law on the faculty. He is the ninth dean in the law school’s 118-year history. One of his primary goals is to expand Brooklyn Law School's non-J.D. offerings to offer other programs, such as master’s degrees and certificates. His other goals center on ensuring the ongoing strength of the J.D. program, and emphasizing fundraising.

His scholarly background centers on criminal law. Cahill has also written about health law and policy. He has published a number of articles and book chapters in various venues, and has co-authored three books on criminal law with University of Pennsylvania Law School law professor Paul H. Robinson: the one-volume treatise Criminal Law (Aspen Treatise Series, 2d ed. 2012); Law Without Justice: Why Criminal Law Doesn't Give People What They Deserve (Oxford, 2006); and the student casebook Criminal Law: Case Studies and Controversies (Wolters Kluwer, 4th ed. 2016; with Shima Baradaran Baughman).

== Personal life ==
Cahill lives in Boerum Hill, Brooklyn with his wife, Rosalyn Scaff and two children.

Preceded by Maryellen Fullerton (interim)	Dean of Brooklyn Law School; 2019–present	Succeeded by incumbent
