= Jerome Prince (legal scholar) =

American attorney (1907–1988)

- Born: August 26, 1907; Manhattan, New York
- Died: December 24, 1988 (aged 81); Greenwich Village, New York
- Education: City College of New York (BA); Brooklyn Law School (LLB, SJD)

Jerome Prince (August 26, 1907 - December 24, 1988) was an American attorney, academic administrator, mystery writer, and legal scholar who served as the Dean of Brooklyn Law School from 1953 to 1971. He was a well-known evidence scholar.

== Early life and education ==
Prince was born in Manhattan, New York, and had three brothers. His father was alternately a tobacco salesman, an elevator operator and a taxicab driver. He graduated from the City College of New York, cum laude, where he was Phi Beta Kappa. He earned two degrees at Brooklyn Law School, an LLB in 1933 and a Doctor of Juridical Science in 1934. He was Editor in Chief of the Brooklyn Law Review during his senior year.

== Career ==
He joined the faculty at Brooklyn Law School in 1934. He was named assistant dean in 1940 and vice dean in 1945 before becoming Dean in 1953. After retiring, Prince remained on the faculty, continuing to teach the law of evidence, his specialty, until his death in 1988.

The Dean Jerome Prince Evidence Competition is an annual competition hosted by Brooklyn Law School. Participants write an appellate brief and then present an oral argument on an evidentiary issue in a contemporary context.

== Personal life ==
Prince was married twice, first to lawyer Martha Kenith. After her death he married the former Elaine Lederman. He was survived by his two daughters, Karen and Elaine from his first marriage and a grandson, Christopher Perkel. Prince died in his home in Greenwich Village on December 24, 1988

== Short stories ==
Prince published five mystery stories coauthored with his brother, Harold Prince one of which was made into a TV show

"Ambush." Rex Stout's Mystery Monthly, No. 9, 1947, 95–106.
"Can You Solve This Crime?" Ellery Queen Mystery Magazine, September 1950, 31–52.
"The Finger Man." Ellery Queen Mystery Magazine, January 1945, 77–91.
"The Man in the Velvet Hat." Ellery Queen Mystery Magazine, May 1944, 99–115. Rpt. Maiden Murders, Harper, 1952. Adapted for Molle Mystery Theatre, December 19, 1944.
"The Watchers and the Watched." Ellery Queen Mystery Magazine, August 1946, 96–115.

Preceded by William B. Carswell	Dean of Brooklyn Law School; 1953–1971	Succeeded by Raymond Lisle
