= Pequannock Township School District =

School district in Morris County, New Jersey, US

Address
- 538 Newark-Pompton Turnpike Pompton Plains, Morris County, New Jersey, 07444; United States
- Coordinates: 40.965174°N 74.295146°W

District information
- Grades: PreK-12
- Superintendent: Michael Portas
- Business administrator: Gordon Gibbs
- Schools: 5

Students and staff
- Enrollment: 2,118 (as of 2024–25)
- Faculty: 180.8 FTEs
- Student–teacher ratio: 11.7:1

Other information
- District Factor Group: GH
- Website: District website
Ind.	Per pupil	District spending	Rank (*)	K-12 average	%± vs. average
1A	Total Spending	$17,109	24	$18,891	−9.4%
1	Budgetary Cost	14,572	47	14,783	−1.4%
2	Classroom Instruction	8,895	56	8,763	1.5%
6	Support Services	2,173	43	2,392	−9.2%
8	Administrative Cost	1,550	37	1,485	4.4%
10	Operations & Maintenance	1,434	22	1,783	−19.6%
13	Extracurricular Activities	487	55	268	81.7%
16	Median Teacher Salary	62,395	30	64,043
Data from NJDoE 2014 Taxpayers' Guide to Education Spending. *Of K-12 districts with 1,800-3,500 students. Lowest spending=1; Highest=68

The Pequannock Township School District is a comprehensive community public school district that serves students in pre-kindergarten through twelfth grade from Pequannock Township, in Morris County, in the U.S. state of New Jersey.

As of the 2024–25 school year, the district, comprised of five schools, had an enrollment of 2,118 students and 180.8 classroom teachers (on an FTE basis), for a student–teacher ratio of 11.7:1.

The district had been classified by the New Jersey Department of Education as being in District Factor Group "GH", the third-highest of eight groupings. District Factor Groups organize districts statewide to allow comparison by common socioeconomic characteristics of the local districts. From lowest socioeconomic status to highest, the categories are A, B, CD, DE, FG, GH, I and J.

== Awards and recognition ==
During the 2009–10 school year, Hillview School was awarded the Blue Ribbon School Award of Excellence by the United States Department of Education, the highest award an American school can receive.

The NAMM Foundation named the district in its 2008 survey of the "Best Communities for Music Education", which included 110 school districts nationwide.

== Schools ==
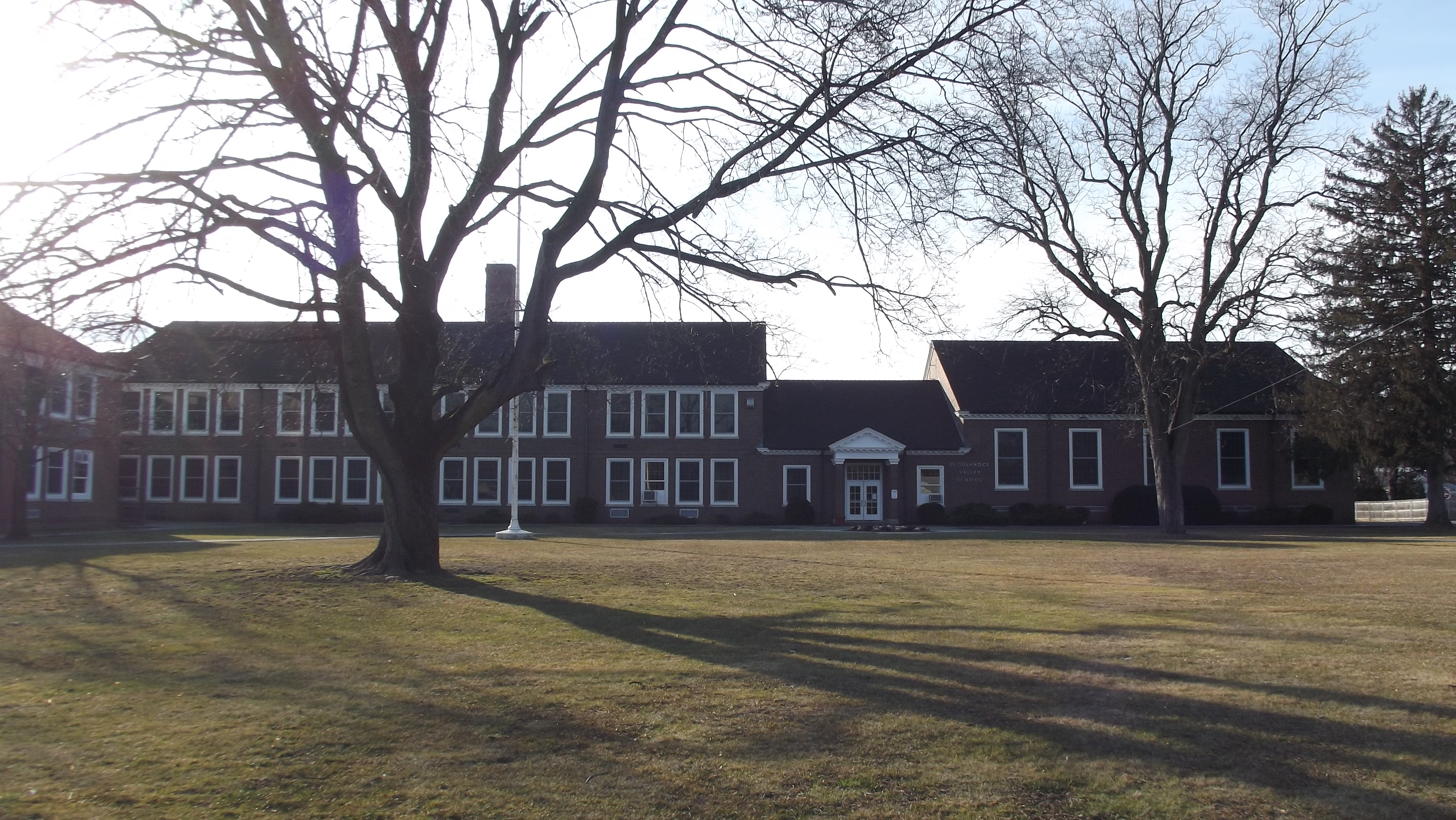
Pequannock Valley Middle School, site of the Mandeville Inn

Schools in the district (with 2024–25 enrollment data from the National Center for Education Statistics) are:

Elementary schools

- Stephen J. Gerace Elementary School 334 with students in grades K–5
  - Matthew Reiner, principal
- Hillview Elementary School 306 with students in grades K–5
  - Allison Stager, principal
- North Boulevard Elementary School 326 with students in grades PreK–5
  - Elissa Scillieri, principal

Middle school

- Pequannock Valley School with 476 students in grades 6–8
  - John Seborowski, principal

High school

- Pequannock Township High School with 655 students in grades 9–12
  - Richard M. Hayzler, principal

== Administration ==
Core members of the district's administration are:

- Michael Portas, superintendent
- Gordon Gibbs, business administrator and board secretary

== Board of education ==
The district's board of education, comprised of nine members, sets policy and oversees the fiscal and educational operation of the district through its administration. As a Type II school district, the board's trustees are elected directly by voters to serve three-year terms of office on a staggered basis, with three seats up for election each year held (since 2015) as part of the November general election. The board appoints a superintendent to oversee the district's day-to-day operations and a business administrator to supervise the business functions of the district.
