= Pompton Plains, New Jersey =

Populated place in Morris County, New Jersey, US

- Census-designated place
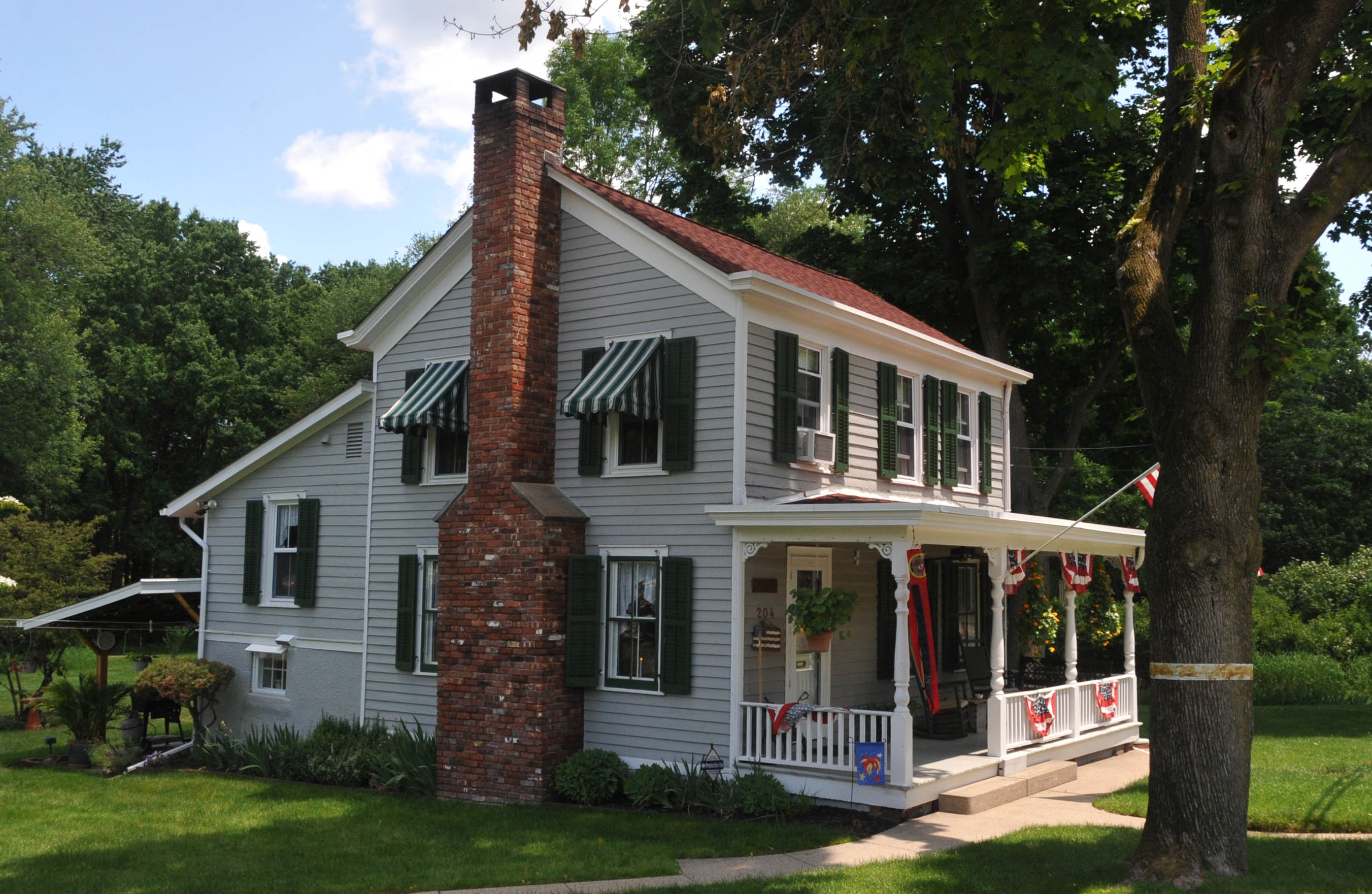
- Historic Van Ness House

- Location in Morris County Location in New Jersey Location in the United States
- Coordinates: 40°58′5″N 74°17′45″W
- Country: United States
- State: New Jersey
- County: Morris
- Township: Pequannock

Area
  - Total: 5.32 sq mi (13.79 km^{2})
  - Land: 5.18 sq mi (13.41 km^{2})
  - Water: 0.15 sq mi (0.38 km^{2})
- Elevation: 201 ft (61 m)

Population (2020)
  - Total: 11,144
  - Density: 2,146.4/sq mi (828.7/km^{2})
- Time zone: UTC−05:00 (Eastern (EST))
  - Summer (DST): UTC−04:00 (EDT)
- ZIP Code: 07444
- Area codes: 973/862
- FIPS code: 34-60120
- GNIS feature ID: 2806168

Pompton Plains is a census-designated place (CDP) and unincorporated community constituting the majority of Pequannock Township, Morris County, in the U.S. state of New Jersey. As of the 2020 United States census, the CDP's population was 11,144. The community was first listed as a CDP in advance of the 2020 census.

== Geography ==
Pompton Plains is situated in the valley of the Pompton River, which forms the eastern border of the community, the township, and Morris County. Across the river to the east is Wayne in Passaic County, and across its tributary the Pequannock River to the northeast is the borough of Pompton Lakes. Neighboring communities in Morris County are Riverdale to the north, Kinnelon to the west, Lincoln Park to the southwest, and the remainder of Pequannock Township to the south.

New Jersey Route 23 runs through the east side of the community, leading northwest 22 miles (35 km) to Franklin and south 5 miles (8 km) to Interstate 80 in Wayne. Interstate 287 passes through the northwest part of Pompton Plains, with the closest access from Exit 52 (Route 23) in Riverdale.

According to the U.S. Census Bureau, the Pompton Plains CDP has a total area of 5.33 square miles (13.80 km^{2}), of which 5.18 square miles (13.42 km^{2}) are land and 0.15 square miles (0.39 km^{2}), or 2.76%, are water, comprising the Pompton and Pequannock rivers, as well as Woodland Lake in the southeast corner of the community. Via the Pompton River, the entire CDP is part of the Passaic River watershed.

== Demographics ==
Historical population
Census	Pop.	Note	%±
2020	11,144		—
U.S. Decennial Census; 2020 2020

Pompton Plains was first listed as a census designated place in the 2020 census.

=== 2020 census ===
As of the 2020 census, Pompton Plains had a population of 11,144. The median age was 51.7 years. 17.6% of residents were under the age of 18 and 31.2% were 65 years of age or older. For every 100 females there were 85.0 males, and for every 100 females age 18 and over there were 81.0 males age 18 and over.

100.0% of residents lived in urban areas, while 0.0% lived in rural areas.

There were 4,736 households in Pompton Plains, of which 21.4% had children under the age of 18 living in them. Of all households, 48.3% were married-couple households, 13.5% were households with a male householder and no spouse or partner present, and 35.5% were households with a female householder and no spouse or partner present. About 38.7% of all households were made up of individuals, and 31.3% had someone living alone who was 65 years of age or older.

There were 5,005 housing units, of which 5.4% were vacant. The homeowner vacancy rate was 1.2% and the rental vacancy rate was 7.9%.

Pompton Plains CDP, New Jersey – Racial and ethnic composition Note: the US Census treats Hispanic/Latino as an ethnic category. This table excludes Latinos from the racial categories and assigns them to a separate category. Hispanics/Latinos may be of any race.
Race / Ethnicity (NH = Non-Hispanic)	Pop 2020	2020
White alone (NH)	9,746	87.46%
Black or African American alone (NH)	67	0.60%
Native American or Alaska Native alone (NH)	4	0.04%
Asian alone (NH)	289	2.59%
Native Hawaiian or Pacific Islander alone (NH)	3	0.03%
Other race alone (NH)	23	0.21%
Mixed race or Multiracial (NH)	212	1.90%
Hispanic or Latino (any race)	800	7.18%
Total	11,144	100.00%

== Education ==
The Pequannock Township School District is the school district covering the CDP.

== Notable people ==
People who were born in, residents of, or otherwise closely associated with Pompton Plains include:

- Jason Biggs (born 1978), actor who has appeared in the American Pie films
- Michael T. Cahill, dean of Brooklyn Law School
- Peter Cameron (born 1959), novelist and short-story writer
- Frank Ackerman Hill (1919–2012), military veteran and World War II fighter ace
- Davana Medina (born 1974), figure competitor
- Susan Misner (born 1971), actress who has appeared on films and television, including roles in One Life to Live, The Bronx Is Burning, Rescue Me and Chicago
- French Montana (born 1984), rapper
- Criss Oliva (1963–1993), musician who was the lead guitarist and co-founder of Savatage
- Pete Yorn (born 1974), singer-songwriter and musician
