= Brooklyn Law School =

Private law school in New York City, New York, US

Coordinates: 40.6920°N 73.9897°W

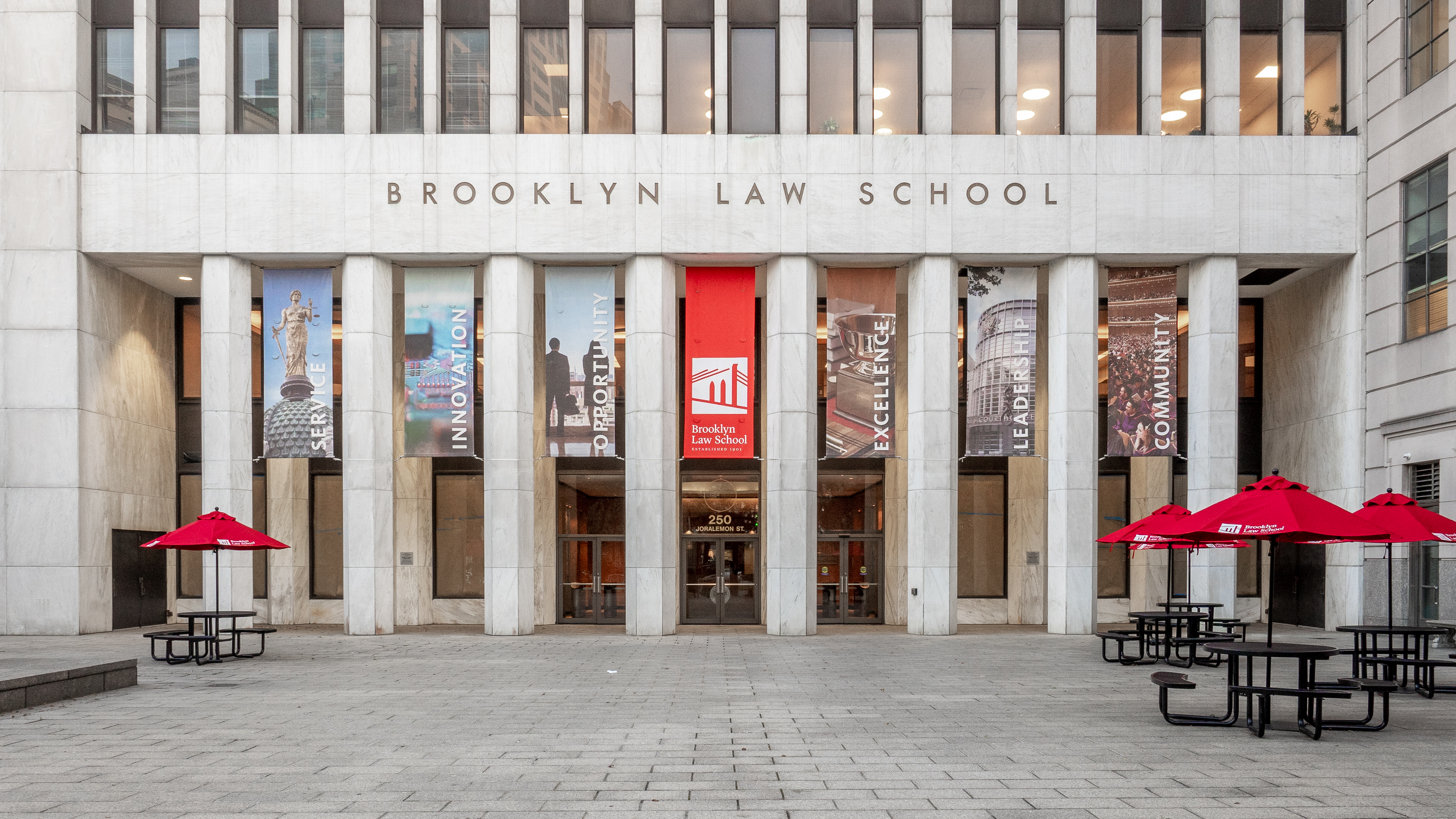
- Brooklyn Law School's main building, at 250 Joralemon Street, Brooklyn, New York
- Established: 1901; 125 years ago
- School type: Private law school
- Endowment: $250 million
- Dean: David D. Meyer
- Location: New York City, New York, US
- Enrollment: 1,119 (881 full-time, 238 part-time; as of 2014)
- USNWR ranking: 105th (tied) (2025)
- Bar pass rate: 87% (2024 first-time takers)
- Website: www.brooklaw.edu

Brooklyn Law School (BLS) is a private law school in New York City. Founded in 1901, it has approximately 1,100 students. Brooklyn Law School's faculty includes 60 full-time faculty, 15 emeriti faculty, and adjunct faculty.

== History ==
The origins of Brooklyn Law School can be traced back to the Pratt Institute in Clinton Hill, Brooklyn, when, in the 1890s, the school established its Department of Commerce. Because of its overwhelming popularity, the Department of Commerce broke off from the main Institute and formed its own school under the guidance of Norman P. Heffley, personal secretary to Charles Pratt. The Heffley School of Commerce originally shared facilities with Pratt.

In 1901, William Payson Richardson and Norman P. Heffley reorganized the Heffley School to become Brooklyn Law School, the first law school on Long Island. Using space provided by Heffley's business school, the law school opened on September 30, 1901, with five faculty members (including Richardson as dean and Heffley as president), and two special lecturers.

The year began with five students and ended with 28. In late 1901, the Board of Regents of the State of New York granted a charter to the law school. The law school became fully accredited by the American Bar Association in 1937, and became a member of the Association of American Law Schools in 1973. The law school's curriculum is registered with and approved by the New York State Education Department.

From its opening, Brooklyn Law School opened its door to minorities, women, and immigrants, and it offered night classes for those with full-time jobs. Dean Richardson also allowed students who had difficulty paying tuition to remain enrolled on credit. The school moved twice between 1901 and 1928, when it finally moved into the first building designed and built specifically for it at 375 Pearl Street in downtown Brooklyn.

The school was affiliated with St. Lawrence University from 1903 to 1943. World War II struck Brooklyn Law School especially hard, and by 1943 enrollment was down to 174 students. St. Lawrence University, which until then operated Brooklyn Law School and conferred its degrees, decided to shut down the school. Alumni organized and negotiated the repurchase of the school's assets, ensuring that Brooklyn Law School would operate as an independent institution.

In 1969, the repurchased school moved to its current location at 250 Joralemon Street, selling its old Pearl Street location to Brooklyn Friends School, who still occupies the building.

== Academics ==
=== Admissions ===
For 2023, Brooklyn Law School accepted 50% of applicants with 20.12% of those accepted enrolling. For those enrolling full time, the average LSAT score was 160 and the average undergraduate GPA was 3.56. For part time enrollees, the average LSAT score was 158 and the average undergraduate GPA was 3.45.

=== Offerings ===
Brooklyn Law School offers students over 190 courses and seminars in the law.

=== Centers ===
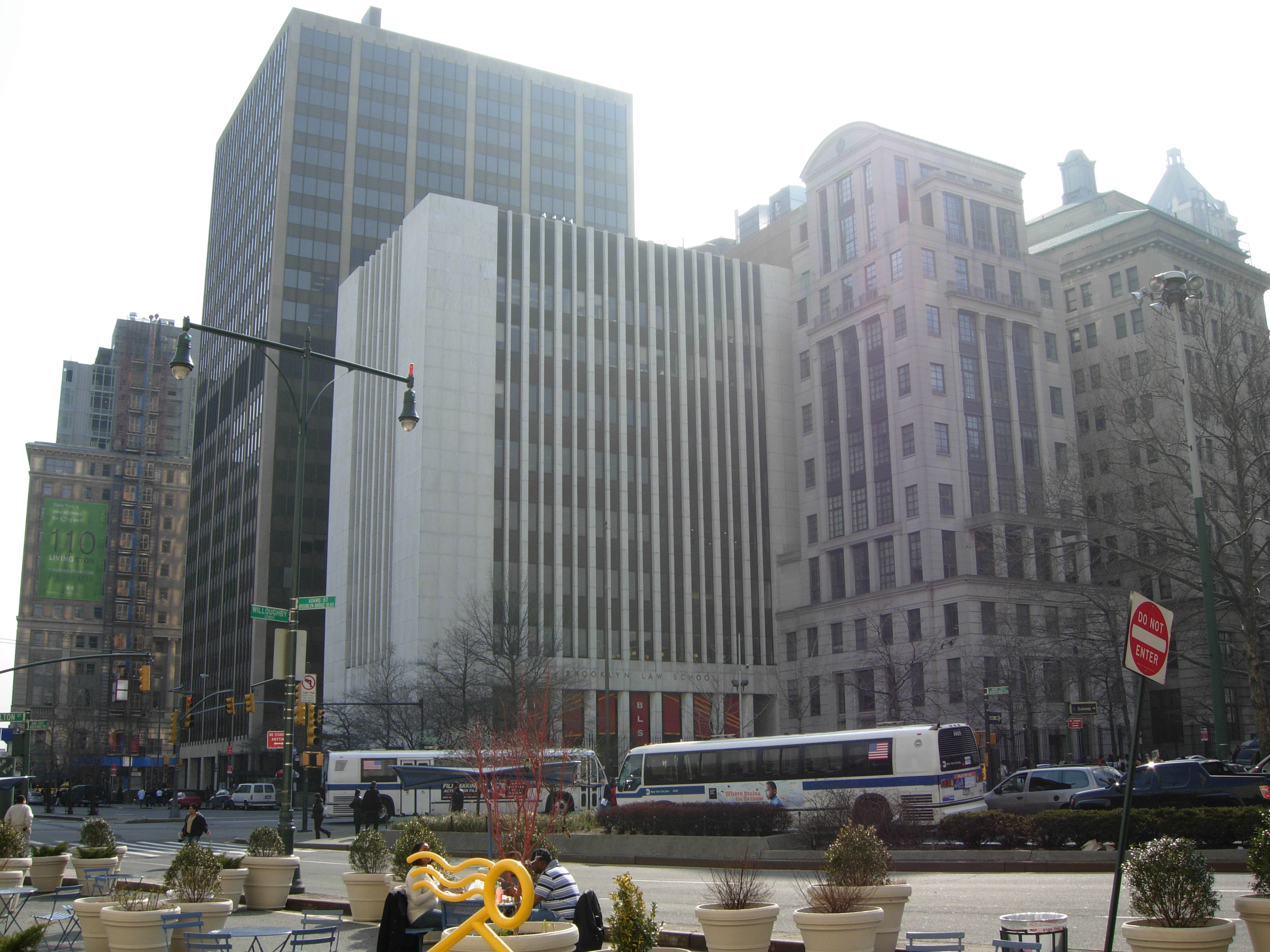
Brooklyn Law School's main building at 250 Joralemon Street, Brooklyn, New York. The 1994 new classical Fell Hall tower by architect Robert A. M. Stern to the right.

Each Brooklyn Law School center focuses on a specific area of the law and hosts lectures, symposia, forums, and round-table discussions that address emerging issues.

- Center for Urban Business Entrepreneurship (CUBE): Explores legal issues surrounding entrepreneurship, and provides effective legal representation and support for new commercial and not-for-profit businesses, while also training business-oriented law students to advise and participate in these sectors.
- Center for the Study of Business Law and Regulation: Unites the law school's existing diverse business and commercial law programs by providing a forum for scholarship that offers new perspectives on and solutions to real world business law and regulatory issues.
- Dennis J. Block Center for the Study of International Business Law: Established by the law school to study and shape international business law and policy.
- Center for Law Language and Cognition: Explores how developments in the cognitive sciences – including psychology, neuroscience and linguistics – have implications for the law at both theoretical and practical levels.
- Center for Health, Science and Public Policy: Offers students substantive knowledge and practical skills related to health and science law.

=== Clinics ===
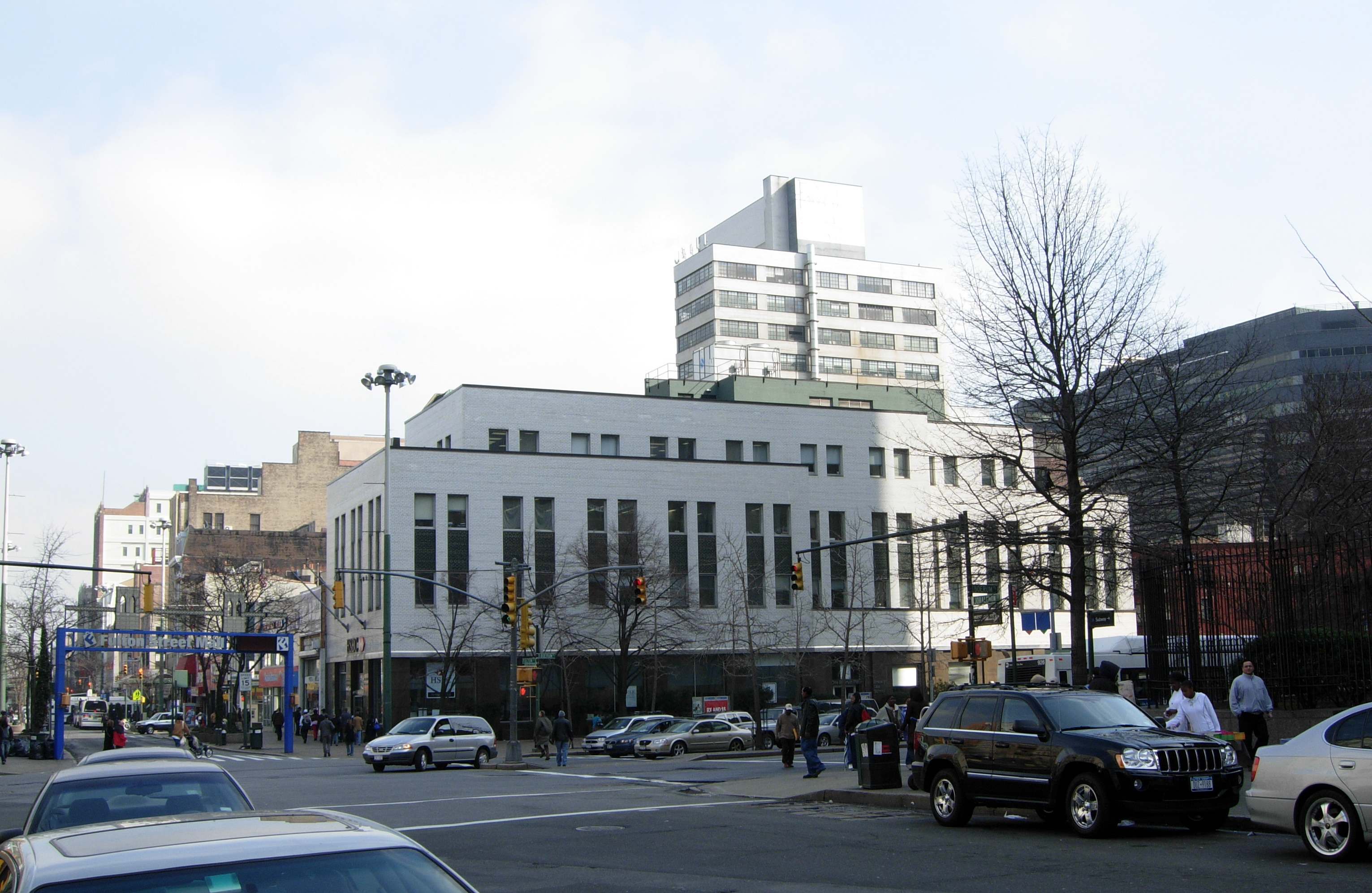
Brooklyn Law School's administrative building located at One Boerum Place, near the Fulton Mall

In 2009, Brooklyn Law School clinical program was ranked 28th in the nation. In 2010, The National Jurist ranked BLS fourth in the country for its public service work, largely influenced by its clinical program. The clinics specialize in the areas of bankruptcy, securities arbitration, immigration, entrepreneurship, technology, criminal law, real estate practice, intellectual property, and mediation. Students represent individual clients, groups, and businesses and appear in state, federal, and administrative courts, on both the trial and appellate levels. Brooklyn Law School created a new mandate in 2014 that requires students to complete at least one clinic or externship course before graduation. Among the law school's clinics include:

- The Advocates for Adults With Intellectual and Developmental Disability (AAIDD) Clinic represents low-income New Yorkers and their families in a variety of civil matters that impact adults with intellectual and developmental disabilities, and provides the opportunity for students to advocate in diverse areas of law ranging from public benefits, guardianship, housing and access to government services.
- The Brooklyn Law Incubator and Policy Clinic, (BLIP), functions like a law firm that represents Internet, new media, communications, and other tech entrepreneurs and innovators on both business and policy advocacy. Students work with clients on transactional, litigation, policy, and other advocacy projects and interact and strategize with members of the entrepreneurial, technology and financial communities, as well as with legislators, regulators and other policymakers.
- Capital Defender and Federal Habeas Clinic affords students the opportunity to represent death row inmates (post-conviction) in other states and defendants in New York who have filed federal habeas corpus petitions. The work consists of filing petitions in the U.S. Supreme Court.
- Community Development Clinic provides opportunities for students to represent community development corporations, cultural institutions, affordable housing providers, and small businesses that serve under-represented communities.

=== LL.M. degree program ===
Brooklyn Law School offers an LL.M. program for foreign-trained lawyers. The program facilitates specialized study in three subject areas: business law, intellectual property law, and refugee and immigration law.

=== Joint degree programs ===
Brooklyn Law School offers five joint degree programs:

- J.D./Master of Business Administration: Brooklyn Law School and Baruch College jointly sponsor a program leading to the degrees of Juris Doctor (J.D.) and a Master of Business Administration (M.B.A.) in Business Administration and Policy.
- J.D./Master in City and Regional Planning: Brooklyn Law School and Pratt Institute jointly sponsor a program leading to the degrees of Juris Doctor (J.D.) and Master of Science (M.S.) in City and Regional Planning.
- J.D./Master in Urban Planning: Brooklyn Law School and Hunter College's Graduate Program in the Department of Urban Planning (Urban Affairs and Planning) jointly sponsor a program leading to the degrees of Juris Doctor (J.D.) and Master of Urban Planning (M.U.P.).
- J.D./Master in Library and Information Science: Brooklyn Law School and the Graduate School of Information and Library Science of Pratt Institute jointly sponsor a program leading to the degrees of Juris Doctor (J.D.) and Master of Science in Library and Information Science (M.S.L.I.S.).
- LL.M./Master in Library and Information Science: Brooklyn Law School and Pratt Institute jointly sponsor a dual degree program for those who have already earned a J.D. The program leads to a M.S.L.I.S. and LL.M. in Information Law and Society.

=== Public service programs ===
Brooklyn Law School's Public Service Office provides individual counseling and information on summer and academic year externships, steering students toward pro bono opportunities, and helping students apply for postgraduate fellowships as well as employment opportunities.

== Rankings ==
- The 2025 edition of U.S. News & World Report ranked Brooklyn Law School tied for 117th among the 197 law schools ranked in the United States.

== Bar passage rate and career prospects ==
In 2024, Brooklyn Law School reported an 87% pass rate for first-time New York Bar Exam takers, a nine-point increase from the previous year and the highest rate in a decade. The school's overall pass rate for first-time takers was 78.82%.

In 2017, 78.6% of the law school's first-time test takers passed the bar exam, placing the law school as the 8th-highest among New York's 15 law schools. Of 369 graduates in 2016, nine months after graduation 323 were employed. Alumni live in 49 states and over 25 countries after graduation. The law school was ranked 46th of all law schools nationwide by the National Law Journal in terms of sending the highest percentage of 2018 graduates to the largest 100 law firms in the US (9%).

In 2013, 94% of the law school's first-time test takers passed the New York bar exam, third-best among New York's 15 law schools.

In 2012, five Brooklyn Law School graduates filed a class action lawsuit, which was dismissed the following year, alleging consumer fraud and common law fraud. As part of a series of identical lawsuits against law schools nationwide, the complaint alleged that the law school administration incorrectly reported employment and salary information for the purpose of enticing students to attend the law school. Prior to the lawsuit, Brooklyn Law School had claimed that 95% or more of graduates found employment within 9 months of graduation, without always distinguishing between full-time, part-time, and non-JD-required employment (which breakdown ABA/NALP rules did not require at the time of the statistics at issue in the suit, but which breakdown has been required since 2012). In April 2013, NY State Supreme Court Justice David Schmidt dismissed the lawsuit, finding that the school's disclaimers on its employment and salary data warned graduates that their own post-grad earnings may not measure up to the data.

Of the law school's 368 graduates in 2017, nine months after graduation all were employed other than 26 who were seeking employment, and 4 who were not seeking employment (the employment status of 4 was unknown); 269 had secured jobs practicing law, and 40 had taken a J.D. advantage position. Brooklyn Law School's Law School Transparency under-employment score was 16.2%, indicating the percentage of the Class of 2017 unemployed, pursuing an additional degree, or working in a non-professional, short-term, or part-time job nine months after graduation.

ABA Employment Summary for 2017 Graduates
Employment Status	Percentage
Employed - Bar Passage Required (Full-Time, Long-Term)	71.74%
Employed - Bar Passage Required (Part-Time and/or Short-Term)	1.36%
Employed - J.D. Advantage	10.87%
Employed - Professional Position	2.99%
Employed - Non-Professional Position	0.54%
Employed - Undeterminable	0.27%
Pursuing Graduate Degree Full Time	0.54%
Unemployed - Start Date Deferred	1.63%
Unemployed - Not Seeking	1.09%
Unemployed - Seeking	7.07%
Employment Status Unknown	1.09%
Total of 368 Graduates

The law school was ranked # 46 of all law schools nationwide by the National Law Journal in terms of sending the highest percentage of 2018 graduates to the largest 100 law firms in the US (9%).

== Location and facilities ==
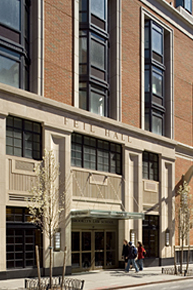
Entrance to Feil Hall, 205 State Street

Brooklyn Law School's academic and administrative buildings and main student residence is located in Downtown Brooklyn, near many federal and state courts and corporate and public interest law offices. Brooklyn Law School's main academic building at 250 Joralemon Street houses classrooms, faculty offices, student journals, a conference center, dining hall, and a four-story law library with 586,000 volumes. The office building nearby at 111 Livingston Street houses many of the law school's clinics, legal writing center, and administrative offices.

Brooklyn Law School guarantees housing in its residences to all entering students. The largest residence is Feil Hall, a 22-story building at 205 State Street that opened in 2005. Designed by noted architect Robert A. M. Stern, Dean of the Yale School of Architecture, it accommodates about 360 students in 239 furnished apartments of varying sizes, and includes a conference center and café.

== Faculty ==
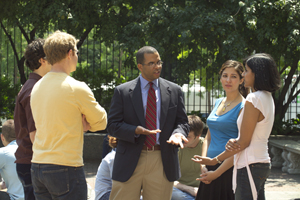
Brooklyn Law School students with Prof. Dean outside the main building

Brooklyn Law School's faculty includes 60 full-time professors, 15 emeriti faculty, and a number of adjunct faculty. The law school draws on a large body of practitioners, public officials, and judges as adjunct faculty to teach specialized courses in many areas of law, including international sales law, securities law, real estate development, trial advocacy, business crimes, corporate litigation, sports law, and border and homeland security law. In addition, in any given semester, visiting professors come from all over the world to teach at the school.

The law school is home to several well-known scholars, including torts professor Aaron Twerski, and Elizabeth Schneider, an expert on gender, law, and civil procedure. Both were highly ranked in Brian Leiter's survey of "Most Cited Law Professors by Specialty."

Other notable professors include Roberta Karmel, a former Commissioner of the Securities and Exchange Commission and columnist for the New York Law Journal, and Susan Herman, president of the American Civil Liberties Union (ACLU). In recent years, the law school has hired a number of new junior faculty members whose work draws on a variety of influences to contribute scholarship in areas as diverse as copyfraud, law and religion, international business law, land use planning, and the secondary mortgage market.

== Journals and competitions ==
=== Journals ===
The law school publishes four student-edited law journals: the Brooklyn Law Review, Brooklyn Journal of International Law, the Journal of Law and Policy, and the Brooklyn Journal of Corporate, Financial, and Commercial Law.

=== Moot court ===
The law school has both trial and appellate advocacy moot court divisions. Each year, it enters approximately 30 teams in national moot court competitions. These competitions span all areas of the law, including family law, criminal procedure, white-collar crime, and international law.

In 2011, Brooklyn Law School took home top international, national, and regional titles. Its teams won first place in the Irving R. Kaufman Memorial Moot Court Competition, and were first place Champions in the Domenick L. Gabrielli National Family Law Competition. They were also Semi-Finalists in the New York Region of the New York City Bar National Moot Court Competition, Semi-Finalists in the Phillip C. Jessup International Law Moot Court Competition (students won Third Best Brief and Sixth Best Oralist), Semi-Finalists in the National Environmental Law Moot Court Competition (students won Best Oralists in the Preliminary Rounds), Semi-Finalists in the Evan A. Evans Constitutional Law Moot Court Competition, Semi-Finalists for the Navy JAG Corps Moot Court Competition, and Semi-Finalists in the Duberstein Bankruptcy Moot Court Competition. In 2019, the school won the regional round of the prestigious Texas Young Lawyers Association National Trial Competition, advancing to the National Round, the second time in two years.

=== Jerome Prince Evidence Competition ===
Each year, Brooklyn Law School hosts the Jerome Prince Memorial Evidence Competition, a national moot court competition. Named in honor of the late Brooklyn Law School Dean and renowned evidence scholar, the competition draws over 30 law school teams from across the country. Many students from the Moot Court Honor Society are involved in the coordination of the Prince Competition, and a few students have an opportunity to work with faculty members to research and write the problem – an issue at the forefront of evidentiary law – that is used in the Competition.

== Student organizations ==
Brooklyn Law School has over 40 student-led organizations, which reflect the diversity of the student body.

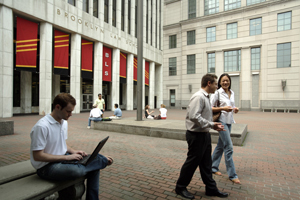
Brooklyn Law School's main building

== Deans ==
- William P. Richardson (1901–45)
- William B. Carswell (1945–53)
- Jerome Prince (1953–71)
- Raymond Lisle (1971–77)
- I. Leo Glasser (1977–81)
- David G. Trager (1983–93)
- Joan G. Wexler (1994–2010)
- Michael Gerber (interim dean; 2010–12)
- Nicholas Allard (2012–18)
- Maryellen Fullerton (interim dean; 2018–19)
- Michael T. Cahill (2019–2023)
- David D. Meyer (2023–present)

== Notable alumni ==
Brooklyn Law School alumni include US Attorney General Todd Blanche, New York City Mayor David Dinkins, US Senator Norm Coleman, judges Frank Altimari (US Court of Appeals for the Second Circuit) and Edward R. Korman (US District Court for the Eastern District of New York), attorneys Stephen Dannhauser (Chairman, Weil, Gotshal & Manges), Myron Trepper (co-Chairman, Willkie Farr & Gallagher), Allen Grubman (entertainment lawyer), and Bruce Cutler (criminal defense lawyer), CEOs Barry Salzberg (Deloitte) and Marty Bandier (Sony/ATV Music Publishing), and billionaire real estate developers Leon Charney and Larry Silverstein.

== Costs ==
The total cost of attendance (indicating the cost of tuition, fees, and living expenses) at Brooklyn Law School for the 2022–23 academic year is $95,271. The estimated debt-financed cost of attendance for three years is $204,197.

== See also ==
- Law of New York
