= List of public art in Brooklyn =

List of public artworks in Brooklyn, New York, U.S.

This is a list of public art in Brooklyn, in the United States. This list applies only to works of public art on permanent display in an outdoor public space. For example, this does not include artwork in museums. Public art may include sculptures, statues, monuments, memorials, murals, and mosaics.

Image	Title / subject	Location and coordinates	Date	Artist / designer	Type	Material	Dimensions	Designation	Owner / administrator	Wikidata	Notes
	Bailey Fountain	Grand Army Plaza 40.67389°N 73.97009°W	1932	Egerton Swartwout; Eugene Savage	Fountain	Bronze					
	Beacon	Theodore Roosevelt United States Courthouse 40.696944°N 73.989444°W		Lisa Scheer	Sculpture	Bronze					
More images	Brooklyn War Memorial	Cadman Plaza 40.69846°N 73.99066°W	1951		War memorial						
More images	Bust of Alexander Skene	Grand Army Plaza			Bust						
	Bust of Edward Snowden	Fort Greene Park 40.6917°N 73.9755°W	2015	Doyle Trankina; Andrew Tider; Jeff Greenspan	Bust	Hydrocal					Removed in 2015.
More images	Dover Patrol Monument	John Paul Jones Park 40°36′41″N 74°2′3″W	1931	Aston Webb	Obelisk						
	Equestrian statue of Henry Warner Slocum	Grand Army Plaza 40.6734°N 73.9691°W	1905	Frederick William MacMonnies	Equestrian statue						
More images	Four Eagles	Grand Army Plaza	1901	Frederick William MacMonnies; Stanford White		Bronze; Granite					
	Henry W. Maxwell Memorial	Grand Army Plaza 40°40′26″N 73°58′8″W	1903	Augustus Saint-Gaudens	Memorial	Bronze; Granite					
More images	Henry Ward Beecher Monument	Cadman Plaza 40°41′41.5″N 73°59′24.4″W	1891	John Quincy Adams Ward	Monument	Bronze; Granite					Originally located in Borough Hall Park, relocated to current location in 1959.
More images	John F. Kennedy Memorial	Grand Army Plaza 40.674269°N 73.970177°W	2010	Neil Estern	Bust	Bronze; Granite					Replaced a previous memorial that had been dedicated in 1965.
More images	Lafayette Memorial	Prospect Park 40°39′52″N 73°58′35.7″W	1917	Daniel Chester French; Henry Bacon	Memorial	Bronze; Granite					
More images	Prison Ship Martyrs' Monument	Fort Greene Park 40.6918°N 73.9756°W	1908	Adolph Alexander Weinman; Stanford White	War memorial	Bronze; Granite					
More images	Robert F. Kennedy Memorial	Columbus Park 40.693704°N 73.989994°W	1972	Anneta Duveen	Bust	Bronze; Granite					
More images	Soldiers' and Sailors' Arch	Grand Army Plaza 40.6729°N 73.9698°W	1892	Frederick MacMonnies; Philip Martiny; John H. Duncan	Triumphal arch						
More images	Statue of Christopher Columbus	Columbus Park 40.69391°N 73.98991°W	1867	Emma Stebbins; Aymar Embury II	Statue	Limestone; Marble					
	Statue of Gouverneur K. Warren	Grand Army Plaza 40.673015°N 73.97065°W	1896	Henry Baerer	Statue	Bronze; Granite					
	Statue of James S. T. Stranahan	Prospect Park 40°40′19.5″N 73°58′10″W	1891	Frederick William MacMonnies	Statue	Bronze; Granite; Marble					
	Statue of Ruth Bader Ginsburg	City Point	2021	Gillie and Marc	Statue	Bronze					Scheduled to be dedicated in 2021.
	Unity	40.696°N 73.988°W	2019	Hank Willis Thomas	Sculpture	Bronze					
More images	William Jay Gaynor Memorial	Cadman Plaza 40.69955°N 73.99053°W	1926	Adolph Alexander Weinman	Memorial	Bronze; Granite					
