= Mutual Benefit Life Insurance Company =

Insurance company (1845–2001)

- Industry: Insurance
- Founded: 1845; 181 years ago
- Defunct: June 14, 2001
- Fate: Dissolved
- Headquarters: Newark, New Jersey, U.S.
- Key people: Frederick Frelinghuysen

Mutual Benefit Life Building
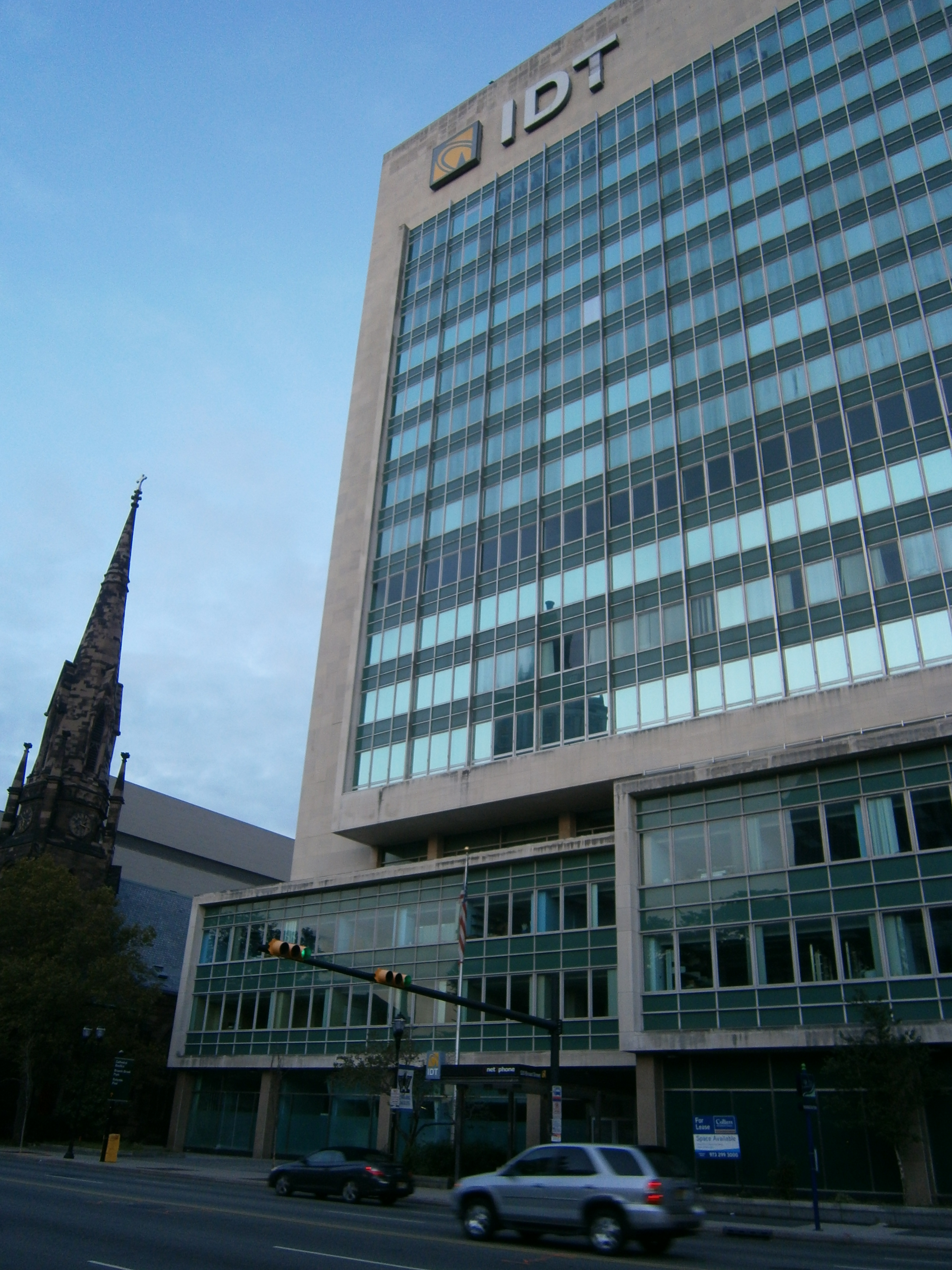

General information
- Type: Office
- Location: 520 Broad Street; Newark, New Jersey
- Completed: 1957

Height
- Roof: 75 m (246 ft)

Technical details
- Floor count: 20

Design and construction
- Structural engineer: George A. Fuller Company

The Mutual Benefit Life Insurance Company was a life insurance provider chartered in 1845 and based in Newark, Essex County, New Jersey, United States. The company was headed by Frederick Frelinghuysen (1848–1924). The company was known as the "Tiffany" of insurance companies, a reference to its reputation as the life insurance company to the upper classes.

Mutual Benefit Life was taken into receivership for rehabilitation by the New Jersey Department of Banking and Insurance on July 16, 1991, after losses in an overheated real estate market led to a run by policyholders, who ultimately lost the purported "cash value" that had been said to have accrued in their policies. At the time, the collapse was the largest ever of an American insurer. AMEV acquired the group life, accident and health insurance divisions of Mutual Benefit in 1991. SunAmerica acquired the remaining divisions in 1998. Effective June 14, 2001, Mutual Benefit was liquidated and dissolved.

== Landmark buildings ==
- Mutual Benefit Life Insurance Company
- U.S. National Register of Historic Places
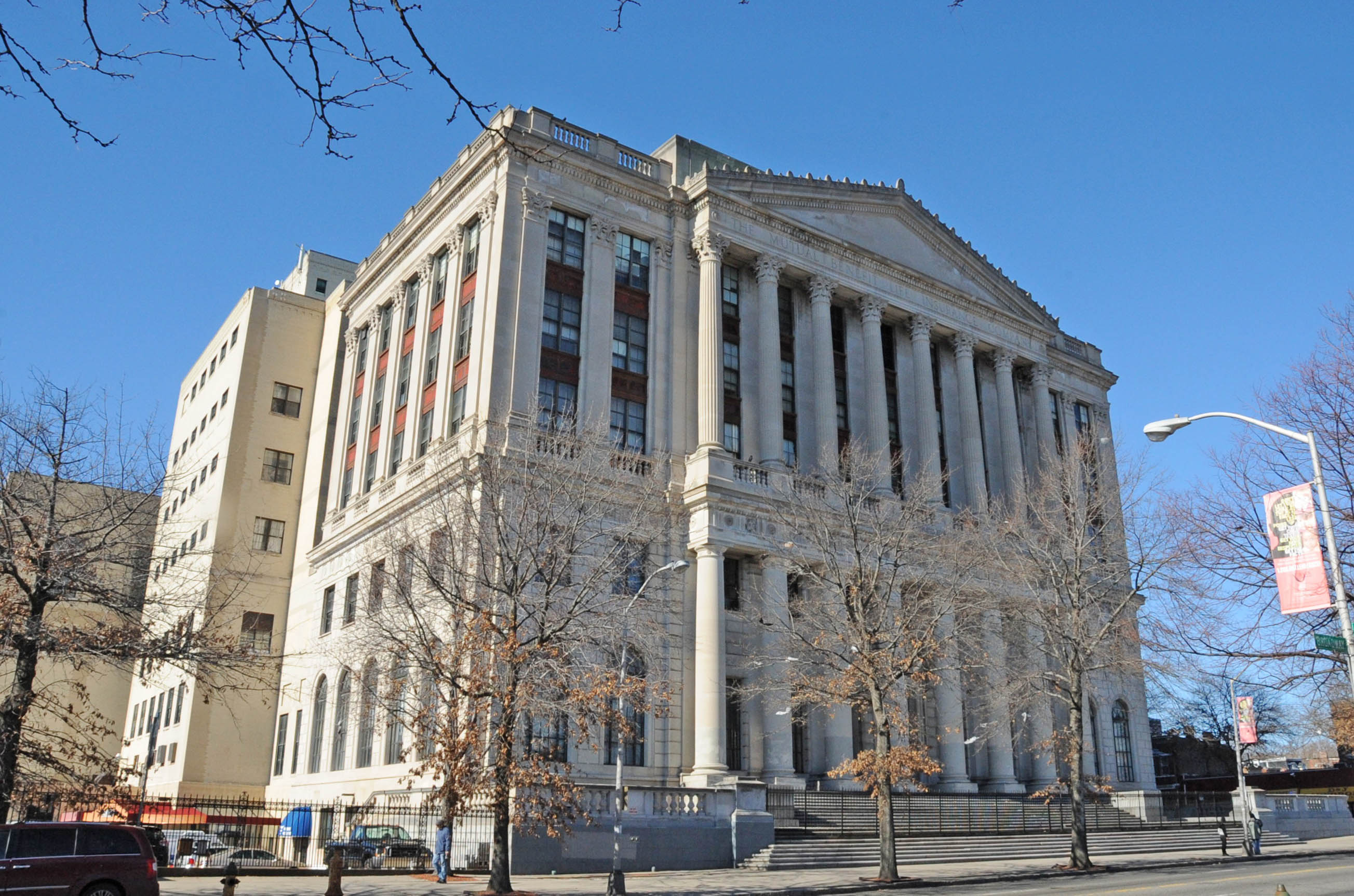

- Location within Essex County, New Jersey
- Location: 300 Broadway near 2nd Ave., Newark, New Jersey
- Coordinates: 40°45′40″N 74°10′10″W
- Area: 3.9 acres (1.6 ha)
- Built: 1925
- Architect: John H. & Wilson C. Ely
- Architectural style: Civic Renaissance
- NRHP reference No.: 83004031
- Added to NRHP: November 17, 1983

Mutual Benefit commissioned a number of landmark buildings in Newark for their headquarters.

After outgrowing previous locations at Broad and Market (from the 1845 founding to 1848), then another ten years in the Insurance Buildings on Market Street, the company built a headquarters at the corner of Broad and Clinton Streets in 1858. The architect is unknown.

In 1904, Mutual Benefit pulled down the 1858 structure and commissioned a replacement through competition. The winner was architect George B. Post, who planned a neo-classical structure for eight stories, giant order Corinthian columns, and a $1,000,000 budget. Because the site was diagonally opposite a set of commanding, fortress-like buildings for the Prudential Headquarters, also designed by Post, a contrasting identity was a key requirement: "The problem was to design a building as different as possible from the Prudential Building, and at the same time make it indicative of the strength and greatness of an important insurance company."

The company's uptown headquarters building at 300 Broadway in Newark was designed by locally important architects John H. & Wilson C. Ely. Finished in 1925, it's listed in the National Register of Historic Places. In the mid 1950s the building was sold to the Archdiocese of Newark and served as home to Essex Catholic High School until 1979. The building was again sold, and as of 2018 serves as a nursing home.

The company moved to larger headquarters at 520 Broad Street in 1957, a modern structure that was built in the International Style as part of the New Newark movement and centered to the north of traditional downtown at Washington Park. The architects were Frank Grad & Sons of Newark, with consulting architects Eggers & Higgins. As of December 2012 there were plans to convert the building, owned by the IDT Corporation, to residential and retail space marketed to the city's student population'

The Mutual Benefit Life Building in Philadelphia is another structure associated with the firm.

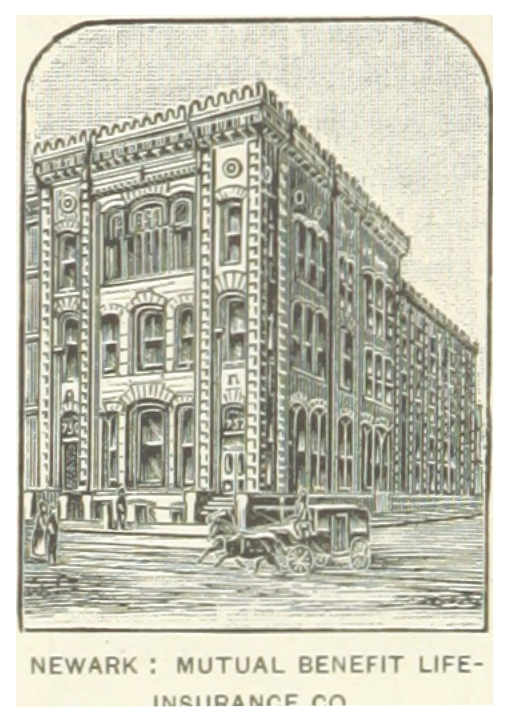
Broad and Clinton bldg, circa 1891 (razed)

George Post building, circa 1915 (razed)

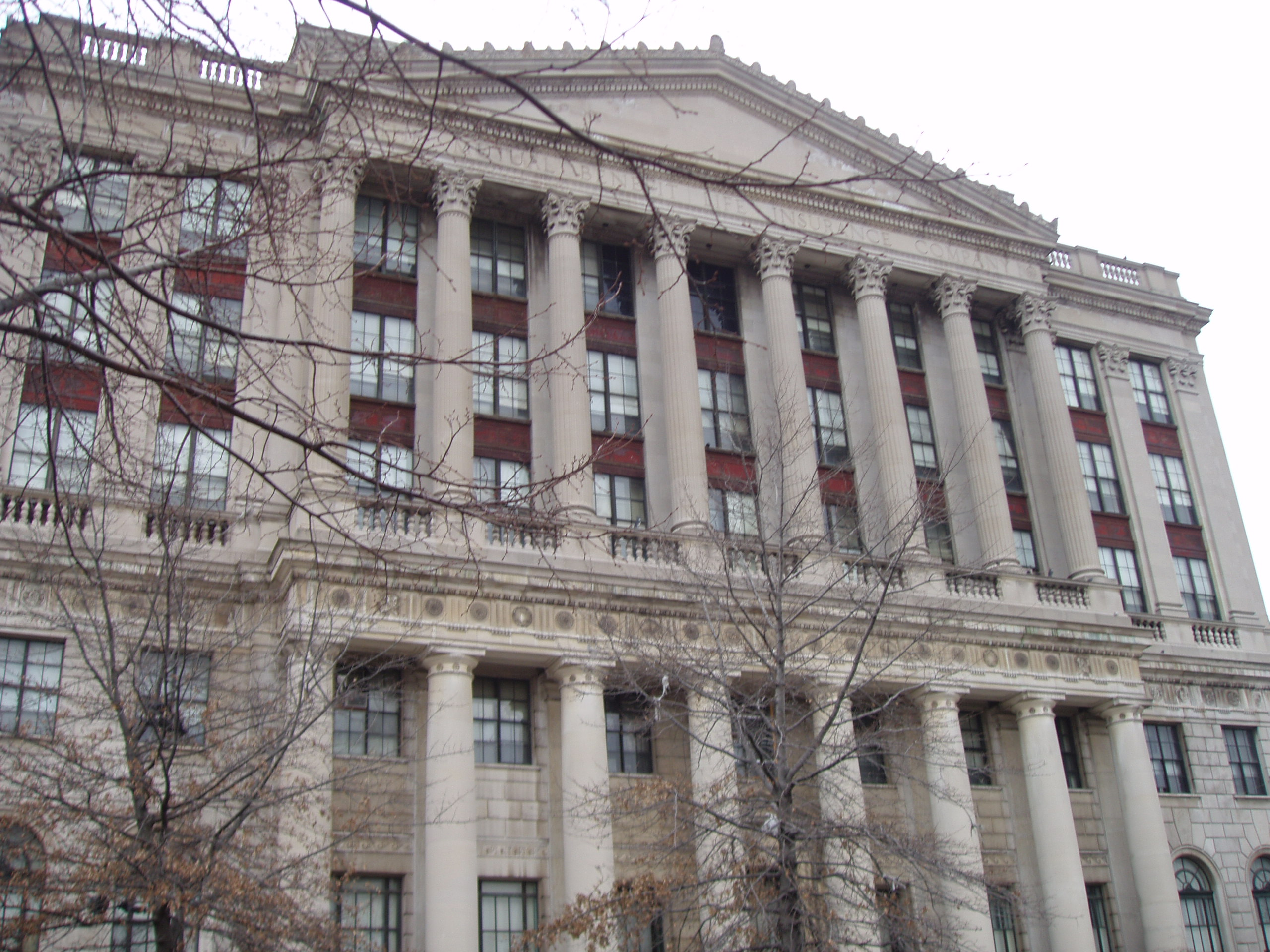
300 Broadway, built in 1925

== See also ==
- History of Newark, New Jersey
- List of tallest buildings in Newark
- National Register of Historic Places listings in Essex County, New Jersey
