= Walt Whitman Park =

Walt Whitman Park may refer to:

- Walt Whitman Park (Brooklyn)
- Walt Whitman Park (Washington, D.C.)
