= Federal Building and Post Office (Brooklyn) =

Government building in New York City

- U.S. National Register of Historic Places
- New York State Register of Historic Places
- New York City Landmark
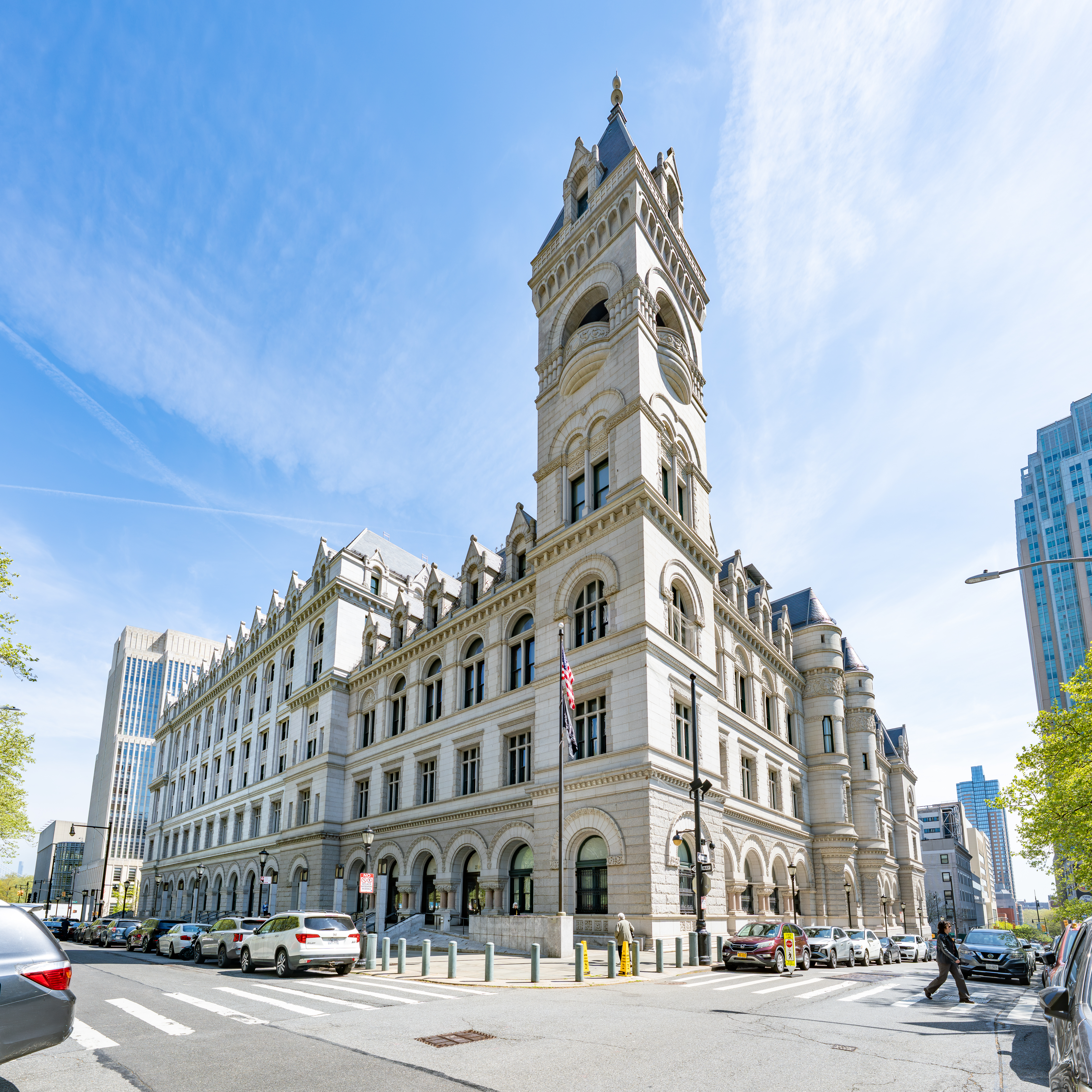
- The original building (right) and north addition (left) (2026)
- Location: 271-301 Cadman Plaza East; Brooklyn, New York
- Coordinates: 40°41′44.3″N 73°59′22.3″W
- Area: 1.5 acres (0.61 ha)
- Built: 1885-91; 1930-33 (north addition)
- Architects: Mifflin E. Bell, William A. Freret; Office of the Supervising Architect under James A. Wetmore (north addition)
- Architectural style: Romanesque, Richardsonian Romanesque
- NRHP reference No.: 74001250
- NYSRHP No.: 04701.000026
- NYCL No.: 0146

Significant dates
- Added to NRHP: October 9, 1974
- Designated NYSRHP: June 23, 1980
- Designated NYCL: July 19, 1966

The Federal Building and Post Office is a historic main post office, courthouse, and Federal office building at 271-301 Cadman Plaza East in the Downtown Brooklyn neighborhood of Brooklyn in New York City. The original building was the Brooklyn General Post Office, and is now the Downtown Brooklyn Station, and the north addition is the courthouse for the United States Bankruptcy Court for the Eastern District of New York, and is across the street from and in the jurisdiction of the main courthouse of the United States District Court for the Eastern District of New York, the Theodore Roosevelt United States Courthouse. It also houses offices for the United States Attorney, In 2009, the United States Congress renamed the building the Conrad B. Duberstein United States Bankruptcy Courthouse, after chief bankruptcy judge Conrad B. Duberstein.

== History ==
Planning and design for a post office in the then-independent city of Brooklyn, New York, began in 1885. During his three-year tenure (1884–86), Mifflin E. Bell, supervising architect of the U.S. Treasury Department, designed the building in the Romanesque Revival style of architecture. The building originally functioned as both a post office and courthouse with four courtrooms.

Much of the original appropriation for the building was allotted for the purchase of the lot, which is bounded by Cadman Plaza East (then Washington Street), Johnson, Adams, and Tillary streets. After Bell's resignation, his design was revised by his successor, William A. Freret, whose final design was a much bolder Romanesque building than Bell had envisioned. Still, some of the more elaborate architectural details of Bell's original design, such as larger corner towers, were never executed in the final design.

Construction was completed in 1891; interior spaces were finished in 1892 and the building was occupied. Shortly thereafter, three passenger elevators and a mail lift were installed.

As the population continued to grow, officials determined more space was needed. Because the original building only occupied the southern half of the lot, the addition extended to the north. In 1930, the Office of the Supervising Architect under James A. Wetmore, designed a compatible addition in a similar style, which was completed in 1933. Two new courtrooms were added as part of the expansion.

The U.S. General Post Office was designated a landmark by the New York City Landmarks Preservation Commission in 1966 and listed in the National Register of Historic Places in 1974. In 1999 the U.S. General Services Administration (GSA) purchased the building and began extensive renovations that included the addition of new courtrooms and the restoration of historic courtrooms, original windows, numerous site features, and interior and exterior materials. It now houses postal services as well as the U.S. Bankruptcy Court, the U.S. Trustee, the offices of U.S. Probation and Parole and the Offices of the U.S. Attorney.

=== Renovation ===
Between 2010 and 2013 the U.S. General Services Administration (GSA) oversaw the substantial exterior restoration of the Courthouse, to protect the award-winning interior renovation. The lead architect was Goody Clancy of Boston and the prime contractor Nicholson & Galloway. Lend Lease led the construction management team as a full participant from the initial investigation through construction documentation and construction phase services with respect to historic preservation, value engineering, and commissioning services. The work included restoring or replacing 75,000 square feet (7,000 m^{2}) of the granite and terracotta facades, including nearly 16,000 terracotta units, as well as 25,000 square feet (2,300 m^{2}) of slate roof and 1,200 wood windows. SUPERSTRUCTURES Engineers + Architects provided commissioning services, which involved individually tracking each element of the building envelope during construction.

The project was awarded a GSA Design Award – Citation in Preservation (2016) and the prestigious Lucy G. Moses Preservation Award from the New York Landmarks Conservancy (2014) and the Silver Reconstruction Award from Building Design + Construction Magazine.

== Architecture ==
The building is an excellent example of Romanesque Revival architecture and is a prominent component of the Municipal Center complex. The original portion of the building is four stories in height and the 1933 addition is seven stories tall. The exterior has remained largely unchanged over time. The lively design of the building contains many character-defining features of the Romanesque Revival style. The central structure contains strong, simple forms with powerful arches dominating the first story. Elaborate dormers, iron roof cresting, steeply pitched roofs, and a tower give the building a picturesque quality.

=== Facade ===
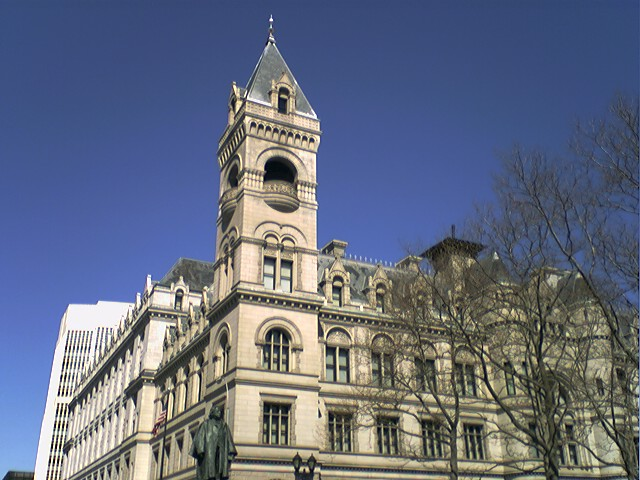
The original building's tower on the southwest corner

The exterior of the building is rich in material, texture, form, and ornament. Semi-circular projections called tourelles protrude from the building. Each level is articulated in a slightly different way and distinguished by belt courses that encircle the building. Round arches of polished granite, which feature rosettes and cable moldings, dominate the first story. The arches spring from carved posts with foliated motifs. Rectangular windows surrounded by contrasting trim are on the second floor, while round-arch openings are on the third floor. The fourth story contains steeply pitched dormers with round-arch windows. A slate-covered mansard roof is topped with ornamental ironwork cresting.

The square corner tower rises above the roofline of the original building. Arched openings with semi-circular balconies are topped by an ornate cornice surmounted by a steeply pitched pyramidal roof.

=== Interior ===
One of the most significant interior spaces is the atrium. It is located in the center of the 1892 portion of the building and extends from the second to fourth floors. The atrium is enclosed by a three-level loggia. Each level of the loggia is supported by cast-iron columns that are adorned with acanthus and anthemion leaf motifs.

The main staircase is in the northeast corner of the original building. A decorative cast-iron balustrade with lantern-style newel posts encases soapstone treads. The stairwell walls are clad in mahogany Tennessee marble wainscot, and the floors are covered with black and white marble tiles laid on the diagonal.

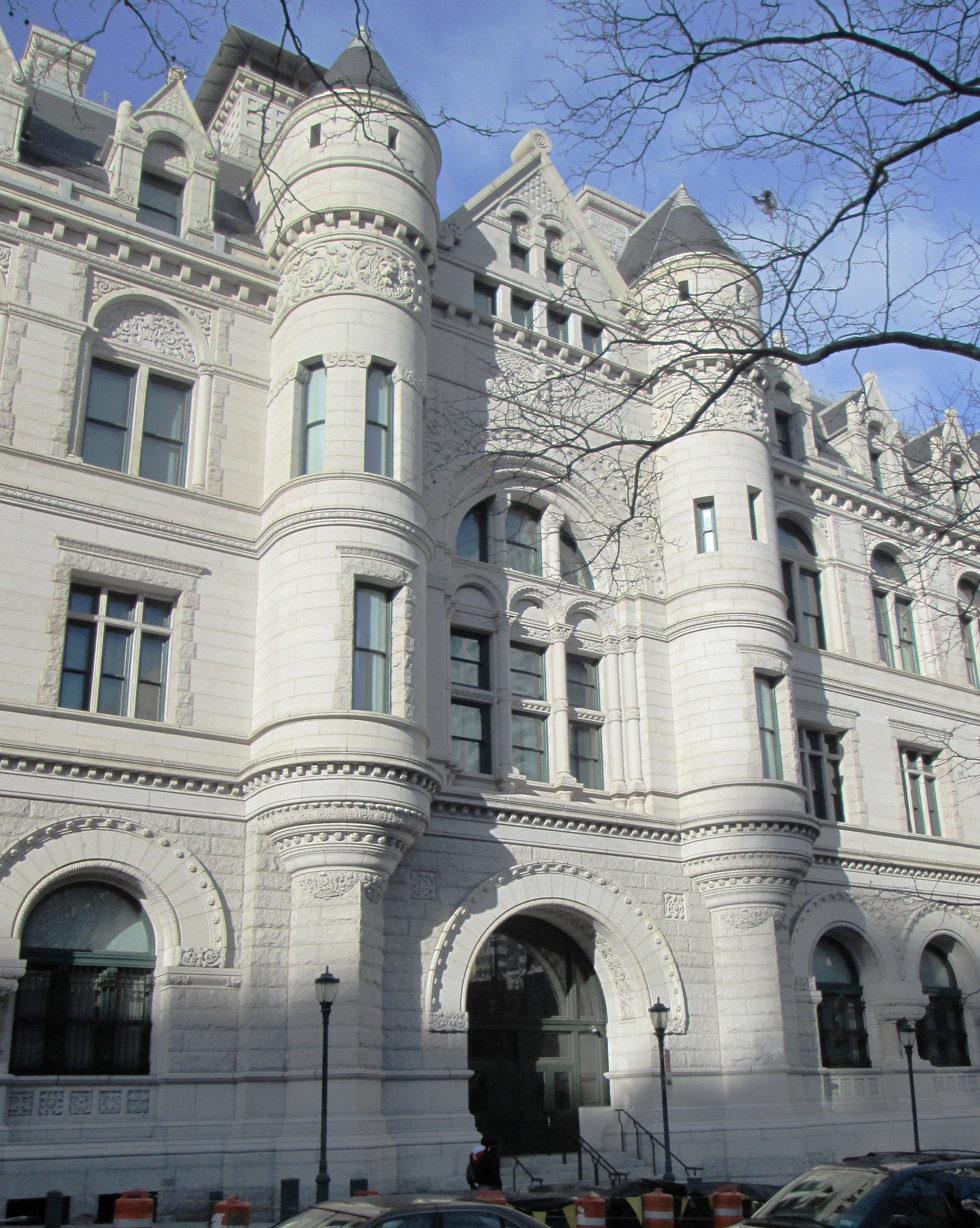
The central section of the original building

The walls of the 1892 courtrooms are also covered with mahogany Tennessee marble wainscot with black soap-stone bands with a marble bead. Large round-arch windows have carved wood mullions and are operated by cast-metal pulls with griffin-head motifs. One of the courtrooms contains a marble and soapstone fireplace, which has a carved leaf pattern and marble mantel. Fireplaces are also in some of the original office spaces.

Some interior spaces have been altered over time. During World War II, a skylight and laylight that originally illuminated the postal work floor were covered to comply with black-out laws implemented to protect the country from enemy bombings. In 1980, the monumental lobby of the original building was altered and most features removed. To accommodate the U.S. Bankruptcy Court and U.S. Attorneys, GSA began an extensive renovation project in 1999. A U-shaped green-glass and aluminum curtain wall was added to the 1933 portion of the building in 2003, forming an interior atrium that, along with new skylights, admits natural light. GSA also refurbished interior stone, metal, plaster, and wood finishes; restored historic windows and doors; and added three new courtrooms. On the exterior, the cast-iron roof cresting was repaired and historically appropriate street-lights were installed on the site. The design, which was completed by R.M. Kliment & Frances Halsband Architects, received a 1998 Design Award citation from GSA.

== See also ==
- List of New York City Designated Landmarks in Brooklyn
- National Register of Historic Places listings in Brooklyn
