= Morrisania Air Rights =

Public housing development in the Bronx, New York

- NYCHA property
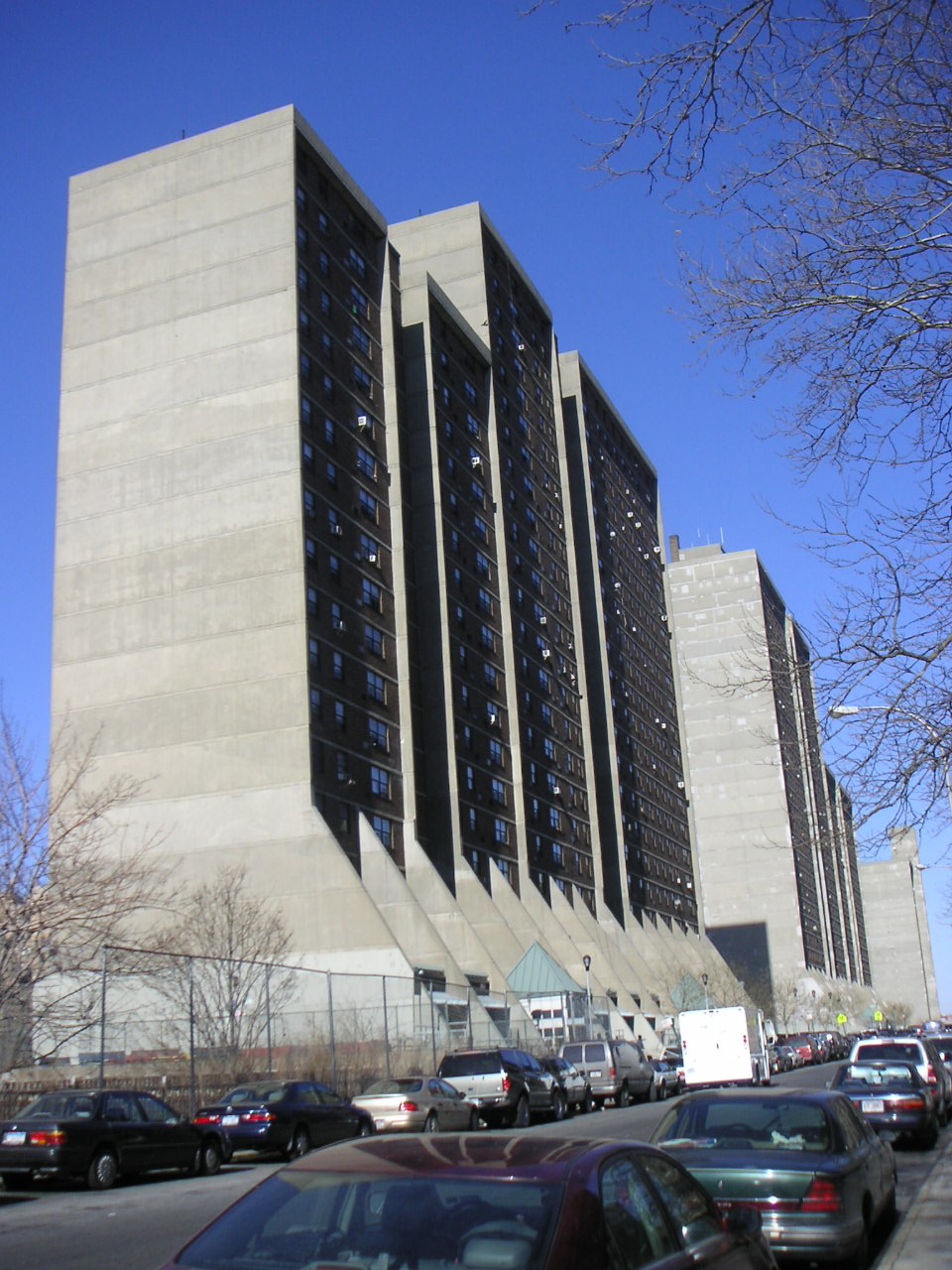
- Location within New York City
- Coordinates: 40.8243°N 73.9175°W
- Country: United States
- State: New York
- City: New York City
- Borough: Bronx
- ZIP codes: 10451
- Area codes: 718, 347, 929, and 917

Morrisania Air Rights is a New York City Housing Authority (NYCHA) public housing project in Melrose and Morrisania, Bronx, consisting of three buildings, 19, 23, and 29 stories tall. There are 843 apartments housing some 1,952 residents. It was designed by the architectural firm The Eggers Partnership.

== Development ==
The planning for the development began in 1971, but construction did not begin until the late 1970s. By purchasing the air rights above the Metro-North Railroad tracks (then Penn Central), the new housing project could be built without tearing down any buildings or displacing any residents both of which saved on costs and may be one of the reasons why NYCHA was able to build such a large project during a period when few public housing units were built, even in New York City.

The Morrisania Air Rights utilized a method of construction developed at the Massachusetts Institute of Technology that relies on steel trusses rather than closely spaced steel columns, allowing the railroad to remain in operation during construction. Constructed well after the boom of public housing through the 1940s, 50s and 60s, NYCHA stopped naming the buildings inspirationally knowing there would be many tenant applications and the development is named after the air rights. The project was completed on January 1, 1981.

The housing complex has persistently suffered from a higher-than-average rate of violent crime for the area and is sometimes referred to as "Vietnam" or the "Vietnam Projects."

== See also ==
- New York City Housing Authority
- List of New York City Housing Authority properties
