= Mutual Benefit Life Building =

Building in Philadelphia, Pennsylvania

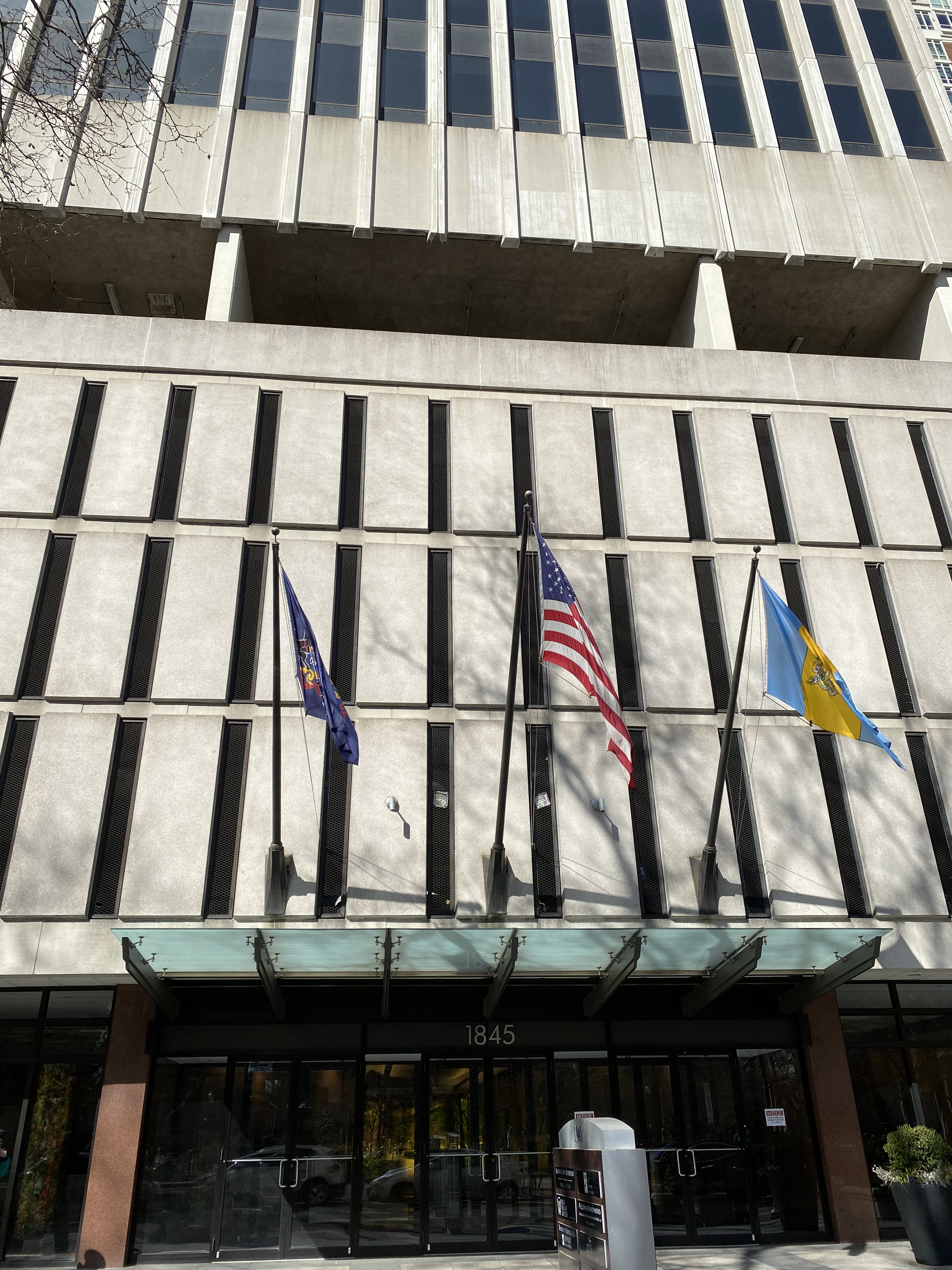
- Building entrance, ca. 2021
- Interactive map of the Mutual Benefit Life Building area

General information
- Location: 1845 Walnut Street, Philadelphia, Pennsylvania, United States
- Coordinates: 39.95023°N 75.1717°W

Design and construction
- Architecture firm: Eggers & Higgins

The Mutual Benefit Life Building is a twenty-five-floor high rise office building that is located at 1845 Walnut Street on Rittenhouse Square in Center City Philadelphia, 19103.

It was placed on the Philadelphia Register of Historic Places in 1995.

== History and architectural features ==
It was designed by Eggers & Higgins and completed in 1972. The building was originally built by the now defunct Mutual Benefit Life Insurance Company of Newark, New Jersey. It is built over a former Philadelphia Parking Authority parking garage that is now operated by Parkway Corporation. The building was placed on the Philadelphia Register of Historic Places in 1995.
