= Eggers & Higgins =

American architectural firm

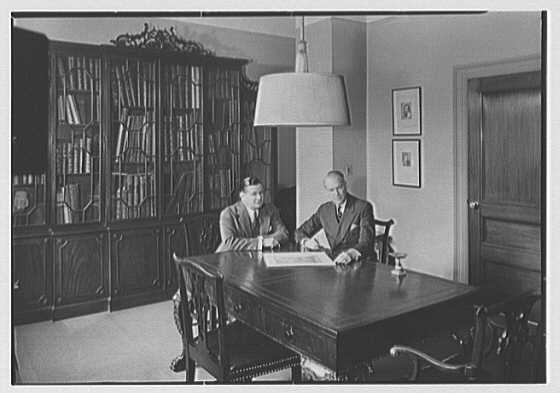
Eggers and Higgins in their New York City offices in 1941

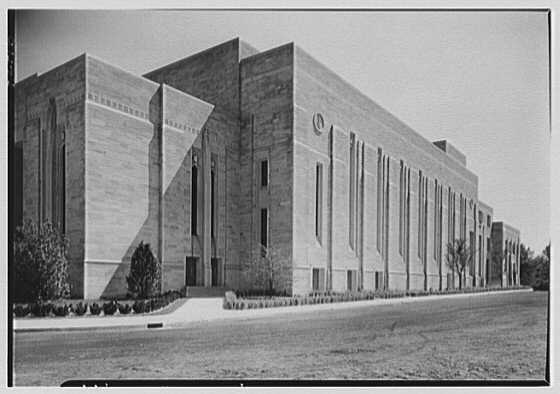
Indiana University's auditorium, developed by Eggers and Higgins in 1942

Eggers & Higgins was a New York architectural firm partnered by Otto Reinhold Eggers (August 4, 1882 – April 23, 1964) and Daniel Paul Higgins (September 12, 1886 – December 26, 1953). The architects were responsible for the construction phase of the Jefferson Memorial beginning in 1939, two years after the death of its original architect, John Russell Pope, despite protests that their appointment had been undemocratic and therefore "un-Jeffersonian". Critics argued a competition should have been held to choose Pope's successor. In 1941, they also completed construction of Pope's other famous design, the West Building of the National Gallery of Art, also in Washington, D.C.

The pair were longtime associates of Pope in the firm he founded in 1903 as the Office of John Russell Pope, Architect. Eggers was a brilliant designer and renderer who served as Pope's right hand for almost thirty years. They changed the name of the firm to Eggers & Higgins in 1937, soon after Pope's death. In 1958, it ranked as the fourth-largest architecture firm in the United States. The firm was renamed The Eggers Partnership in 1970, and then as The Eggers Group, PC when it became a professional corporation in 1976. It eventually merged into what is now RMJM, a large architectural firm with offices in the United States, the United Kingdom, and Asia.

Eggers & Higgins also designed the Brooklyn War Memorial, a classical stone building in Cadman Plaza dedicated to Brooklynites who fought in World War II. At the same time, they also designed the Vanderbilt Law School Building, now Vanderbilt Hall of the New York University School of Law. For the 1939 New York World's Fair they designed two pavilions and attractions: the Railroads Building, the largest at the Fair, and the Schaefer center, a restaurant seating 1600 with a long open-air bar. In Lincoln Center the firm developed Damrosch Park, an outdoor amphitheater with a bowl-style stage known as the Guggenheim Band Shell.

In addition to their planning role with New York University on the redevelopment of Washington Square, the firm was also engaged with Indiana University as their primary architects for more than 30 years. They designed all the major buildings on the Bloomington campus from the Indiana University Auditorium completed in 1941, until they were replaced on the musical arts center project in 1962. Their major campus building designs included the Fine Arts Building, Lilly Library, the Stadium and Assembly Hall. They were also tapped for the development of the Indiana University School of Medicine campus including the Indiana University Health University Hospital.

In 1948, Eggers was elected into the National Academy of Design as an Associate member, and became a full Academician in 1951.

== Other notable designs ==
- St. Clare's Church (Staten Island), New York City (1921 church, 1936 school)
- Silliman College at Yale University, New Haven, Connecticut (1940)
- SS America (1940) (interior architects)
- St. Helena Church, Parkchester, The Bronx, New York City (1940)
- Cardinal Hayes High School, The Bronx, New York City (1941)
- United States Naval Training Center Bainbridge, Maryland (1942)
- Le Moyne College, DeWitt, New York (1946)
- Church of Our Lady of Victory, Manhattan, New York City (1946)
- Morehead Planetarium at the University of North Carolina at Chapel Hill (1949)
- Brooklyn War Memorial at Cadman Plaza, Brooklyn, New York City (1951)
- The four dormitories at Manhattanville University (1951–1963)
- Vanderbilt Hall, New York University, Manhattan, New York City (1951)
- One, Two and Three Gateway Center, Pittsburgh, Pennsylvania (1952)
- Alfred E. Smith Houses, Manhattan, New York City (1952)
- SS United States (1952) (interior architects)
- St. Francis Hospital (operating room), Flower Hill, New York (1953)
- U.S. Embassy, Ankara, Turkey (1953)
- General Ulysses S. Grant Houses, Manhattan, New York City (1956)
- Canada House in Manhattan, New York City (1957) (with Marani & Morris)
- Parran Hall at the University of Pittsburgh (1957)
- Reformed Church of Bronxville, New York (1957 expansion)
- Dirksen Senate Office Building, Washington, D.C. (1958)
- Francis Lewis High School, Fresh Meadows, New York (1960)
- Cathedral of St. Joseph in Hartford, Connecticut (1962)
- Herbert Hoover Presidential Library and Museum, West Branch, Iowa (1962)
- Trinity Chapel, New York University, Manhattan, New York City (1964)
- Jacob K. Javits Federal Building in the Civic Center district of Manhattan, New York City (1967) (with Alfred Easton Poor and Kahn & Jacobs)
- Manhattan Church of Christ, Upper East Side, Manhattan, New York City (1967)
- One Pace Plaza at Pace University (1969)
- Eigenmann Hall at Indiana University (1969)
- Mutual Benefit Life Building in Philadelphia, Pennsylvania (1972)
- Morrisania Air Rights, Bronx, New York (1981)
