= Henry W. Maxwell Memorial =

Memorial in Brooklyn, New York, U.S.

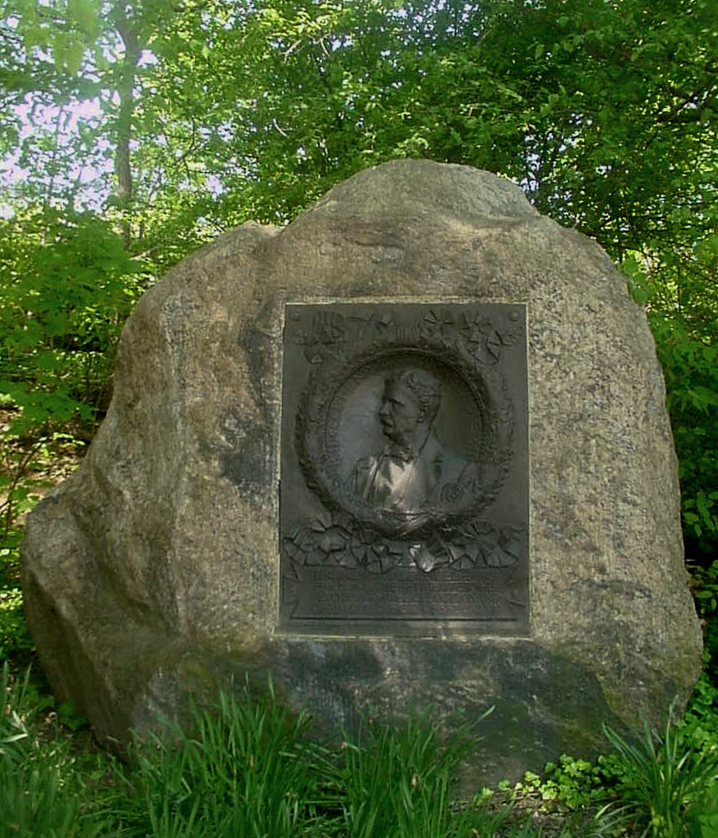
- Henry W. Maxwell Memorial (2007)
- Interactive map of Henry W. Maxwell Memorial
- Location: Grand Army Plaza, Brooklyn, New York City, United States
- Coordinates: 40°40′26″N 73°58′8″W
- Designer: Augustus Saint-Gaudens (Assisted by Albert Jaegers)
- Fabricator: Modern Art Foundry (replacement)
- Material: Bronze; Granite
- Width: 6 feet (1.8 m)
- Height: 8 feet (2.4 m)
- Weight: 20 tons
- Dedicated date: December 26, 1903
- Dedicated to: Henry W. Maxwell

The Henry W. Maxwell Memorial is a public memorial located in Brooklyn's Grand Army Plaza in New York City. The memorial, designed by sculptor Augustus Saint-Gaudens, consists of a bronze tablet featuring a relief of Maxwell, a local philanthropist and park commissioner, affixed to a boulder. The memorial was dedicated in 1903 at the intersection of Eastern Parkway and Flatbush Avenue. In 1912, the memorial was moved to its present location at Grand Army Plaza. In the 1970s, due to vandalism, the plaque was removed and placed in storage, with a replacement plaque affixed to the boulder in 1996. The original plaque is located in the Brooklyn Museum.

== History ==
=== Biography ===
Henry W. Maxwell was born on December 17, 1850. Raised in Brooklyn, New York, he was a successful businessman, serving as a business partner in the Maxwell and Graves Bank and as a director of several other corporations, including the Brooklyn Trust Company. Maxwell was also a prolific philanthropist, donating to numerous educational endeavors in the city, including the Long Island College Hospital and the Brooklyn Institute of Arts and Science. He was also involved in local politics, serving as a member of the Brooklyn board of education for several years and as Brooklyn's parks commissioner in 1884. He died in 1902 at the age of 52, with some estimates claiming that he donated over $300,000 a year during his life. On the day of his funeral, flags at all of Brooklyn's public schools flew at half-staff as a show of respect.

=== Memorial ===
Shortly after his death, several friends and acquaintances began planning a public memorial in his honor. A committee was formed to raise money for this purpose, with Charles A. Schieren as its chairman, and they commissioned noted American sculptor Augustus Saint-Gaudens to create a memorial plaque. Saint-Gaudens worked on the plaque at his studio in Cornish, New Hampshire, where he was assisted by another sculptor, Albert Jaegers. In total, the sculpture cost $7,000. The finished plaque was then affixed to a large boulder that had been excavated from Brooklyn's Sunset Park. The finished memorial, located at the intersection of Eastern Parkway and Flatbush Avenue, was dedicated on December 26, 1903. Schieren presented the memorial, which was accepted on the behalf of the city of New York by New York City Mayor Seth Low. The memorial, which had been draped with an American flag, was then unveiled by Maxwell's niece.

Initially located next to a reservoir near Mount Prospect Park, in 1912 the memorial was moved to accommodate for the construction of Brooklyn Central Library at the location. The memorial was moved to its current location, Grand Army Plaza, near the intersection of Plaza Street East and St. John's Place, with reports claiming that the move took a week and involved ten horses due to the boulder's weight. Due to persistent vandalism of the monument, the plaque was removed by the New York City Department of Parks and Recreation in the early 1970s. It remained in storage until 1997 when, thanks to support from the David Schwartz Foundation, the plaque was repaired and loaned to the Brooklyn Museum of Art. Two replicas of the original plaque were made, with one re-affixed to the boulder and the other on display at the Saint-Gaudens National Historical Park in Cornish, New Hampshire. The new plaque was cast at the Modern Art Foundry, with a rededication of the memorial held on June 25, 1996.

== Design ==
The bronze relief depicts Maxwell in a three-quarter view facing to the left. Maxwell's head and shoulders are depicted inside a roundel, which is surrounded by a wreath made of oak leaves and acorns. A stylized ribbon is present both above and below the roundel. Around the top edge of the roundel, the following is inscribed: "MDCCCL HENRY W. MAXWELL MCMII". Near the bottom of the plaque, the following is inscribed: "THIS MEMORIAL ERECTED BY HIS / FRIENDS IS THEIR TRIBUTE TO HIS / DEVOTION TO PUBLIC EDUCATION AND / CHARITY IN THE CITY OF BROOKLYN". Additionally, Saint-Gaudens signed the relief with his monogram, "A ST G". The plaque measures approximately 4.25 feet (1.30 m) tall, 3 feet (0.91 m) wide, and 1.25 inches (3.2 cm) deep. The pink granite boulder to which the plaque is affixed measures 8 feet (2.4 m) tall and 6 feet (1.8 m) wide and weighs approximately 20 tons.

== See also ==
- List of public art in Brooklyn
