= Korean War Veterans Plaza =

Memorial plaza in Brooklyn, New York, U.S.

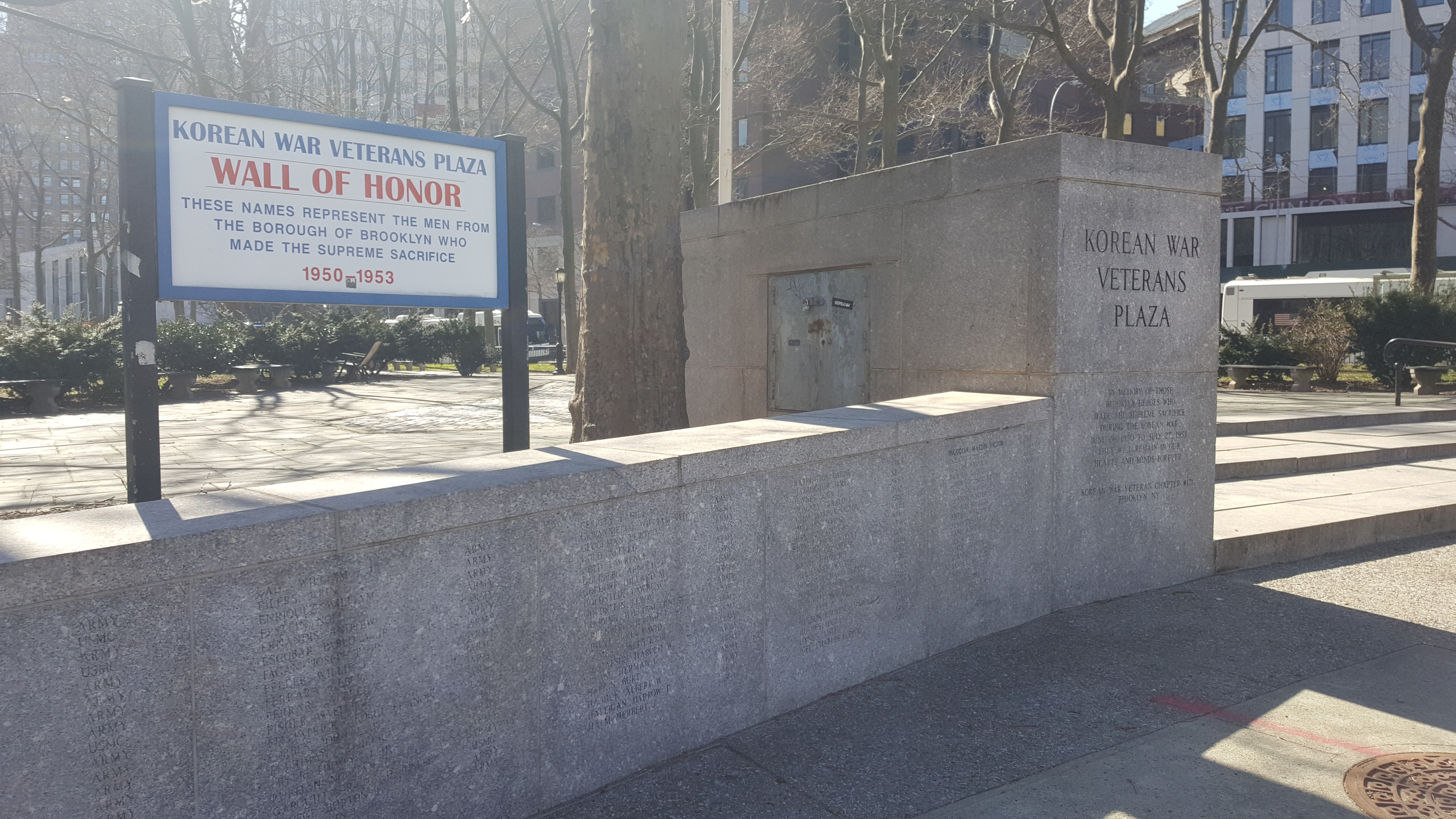
- Part of the plaza in 2020

- Location within New York City
- Namesake: Brooklyn military personnel who served in the Korean War
- Type: Memorial plaza
- Location: Brooklyn, New York City
- Coordinates: 40.6955°N 73.9905°W

Korean War Veterans Plaza is a memorial plaza in Brooklyn, New York City, at Fulton and Tillary streets (Cadman Plaza).

== Description ==
The plaza features a gate and flagstaff, cast in 1992 and dedicated on November 11 (Veterans Day) of that year. The park is named in honor of the Brooklyn military personnel who served in the Korean War.

== See also ==
- List of Korean War memorials
