= William Jay Gaynor Memorial =

Memorial and sculpture in Brooklyn, New York, U.S.

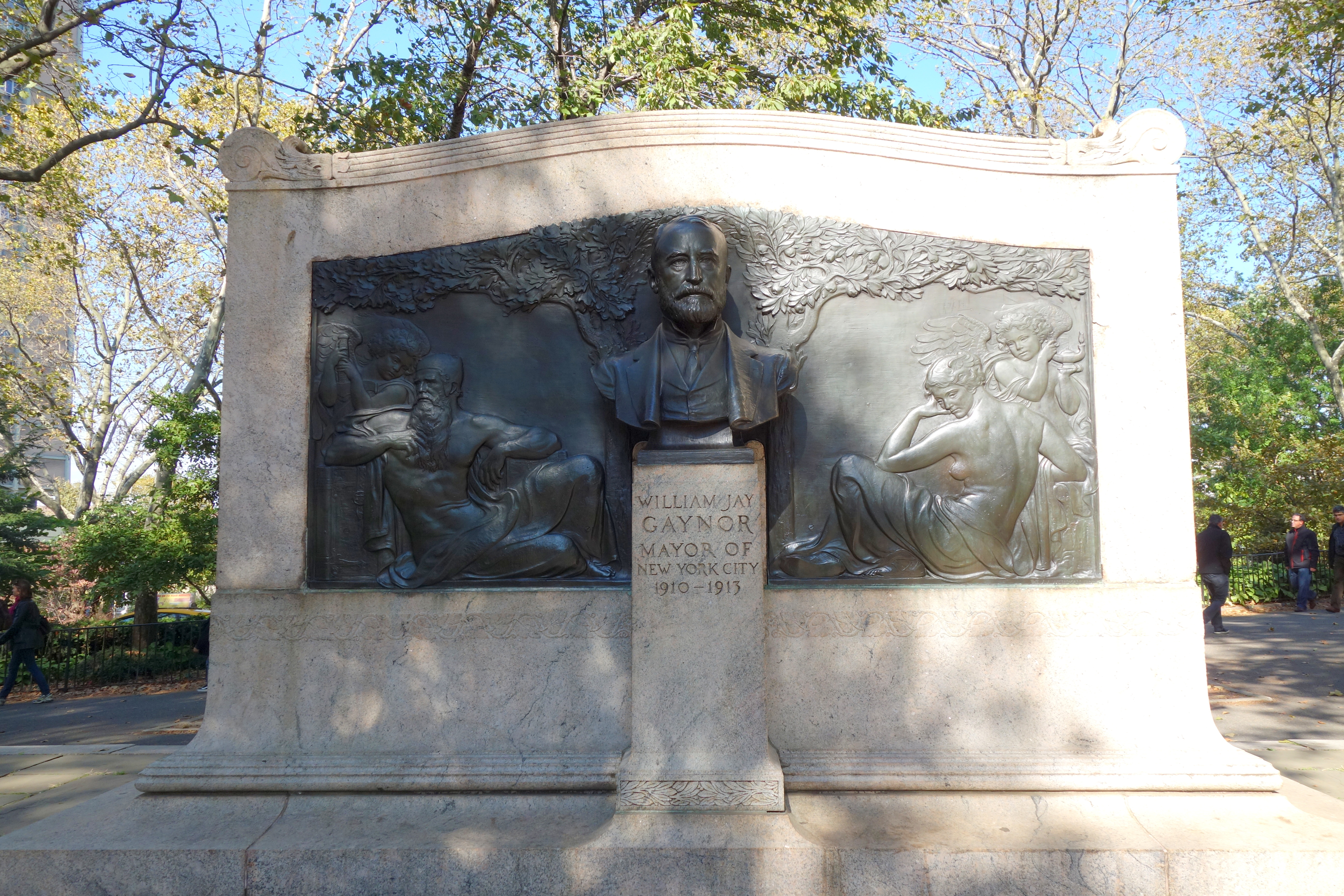
- The memorial in 2013
- Location: New York City, New York, U.S.; 40.69955°N 73.99053°W

The William Jay Gaynor Memorial is a memorial in Brooklyn's Cadman Plaza, in the U.S. state of New York. It features a bronze bust of William Jay Gaynor designed by Adolph Alexander Weinman on a pink Milford granite base. The monument was cast in 1926.
