= Columbus Park (Brooklyn) =

Public park in Brooklyn, New York

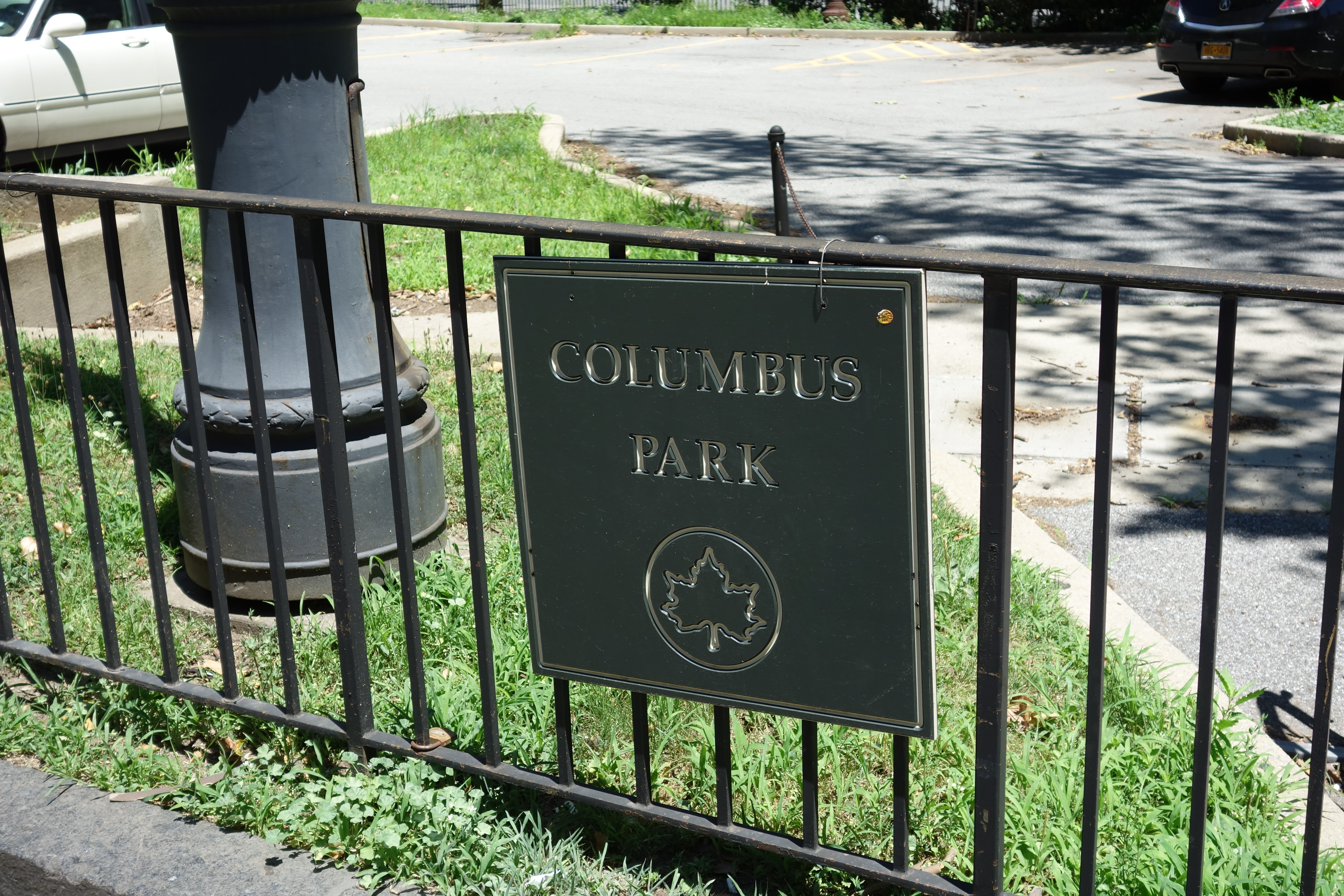
- Park signage in 2018

- Location within New York City
- Location: Brooklyn, New York City, U.S.
- Coordinates: 40°41′38.7″N 73°59′25.4″W

Columbus Park is a park at the southern end of Cadman Plaza, in Brooklyn, New York City, United States.

== Memorials ==
The park features the Robert F. Kennedy Memorial, statues of Christopher Columbus and Henry Ward Beecher, and a tree commemorating John F. Kennedy.

== Parking lot ==
Beginning in 1999, Justices of the Kings County Supreme Court have utilized a portion of Columbus Park as a parking lot for their private vehicles. The parking situation began as a temporary solution whilst a new parking garage was being constructed, but it has now persisted for over two decades, to the chagrin of many local residents. The area which has been transformed into a parking lot sits at the southeast corner of Columbus Park, at the corner of Joralemon and Adams Streets; it is still zoned as parkland. Whether it should be converted back to parkland has long been a focus of political and legal disputes.
