= Walt Whitman Park (Brooklyn) =

Public park in Brooklyn, New York

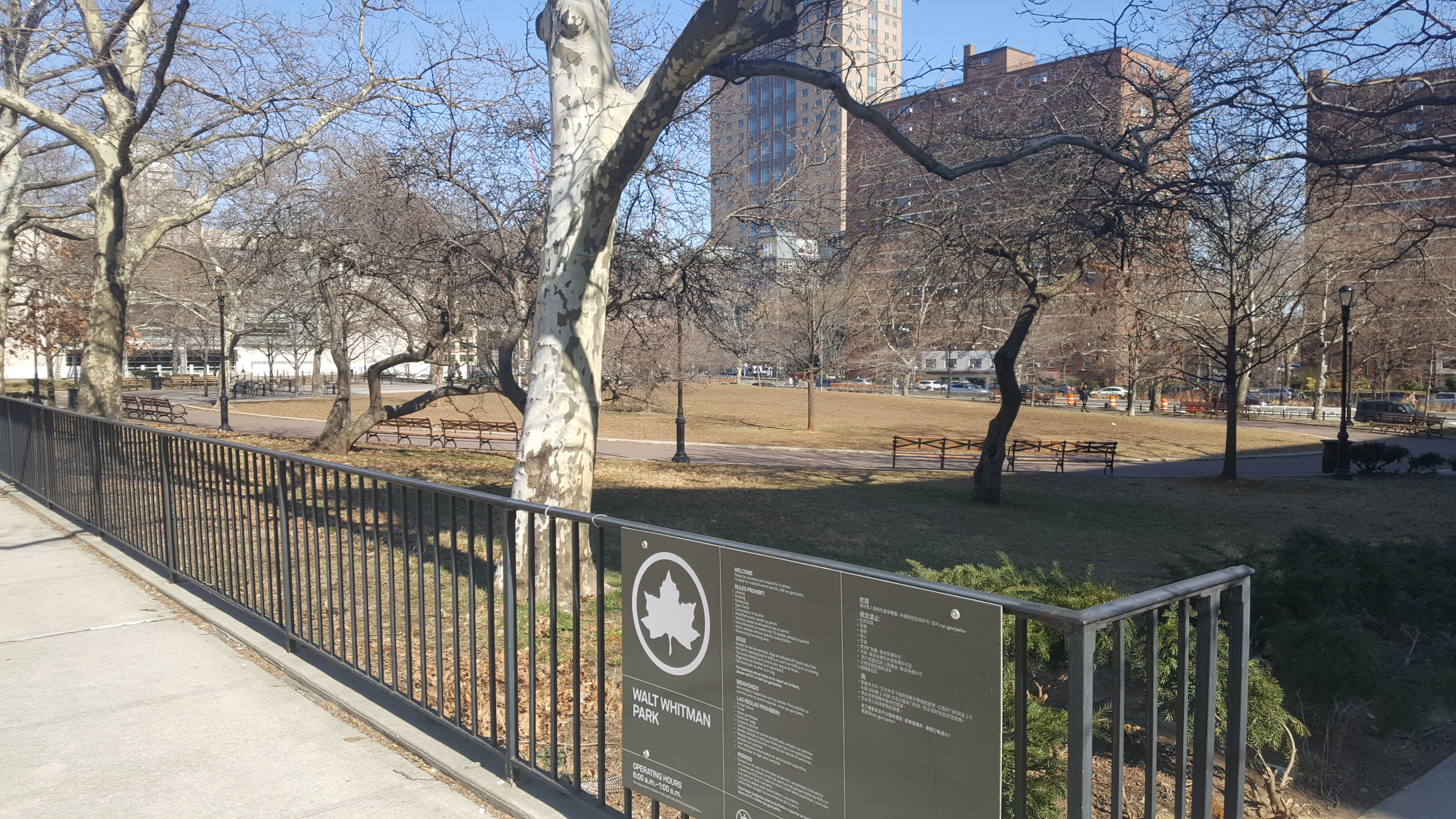
- The park in 2020

- Location within New York City
- Location: Brooklyn, New York City, New York, U.S.
- Coordinates: 40.698365°N 73.989326°W

Walt Whitman Park is a park in the Downtown Brooklyn section of Brooklyn, New York City, commemorating Walt Whitman. It is adjacent to Cadman Plaza East to the west and Adams Street to the east.
