= Theodore Roosevelt United States Courthouse =

Federal courthouse in Brooklyn, New York

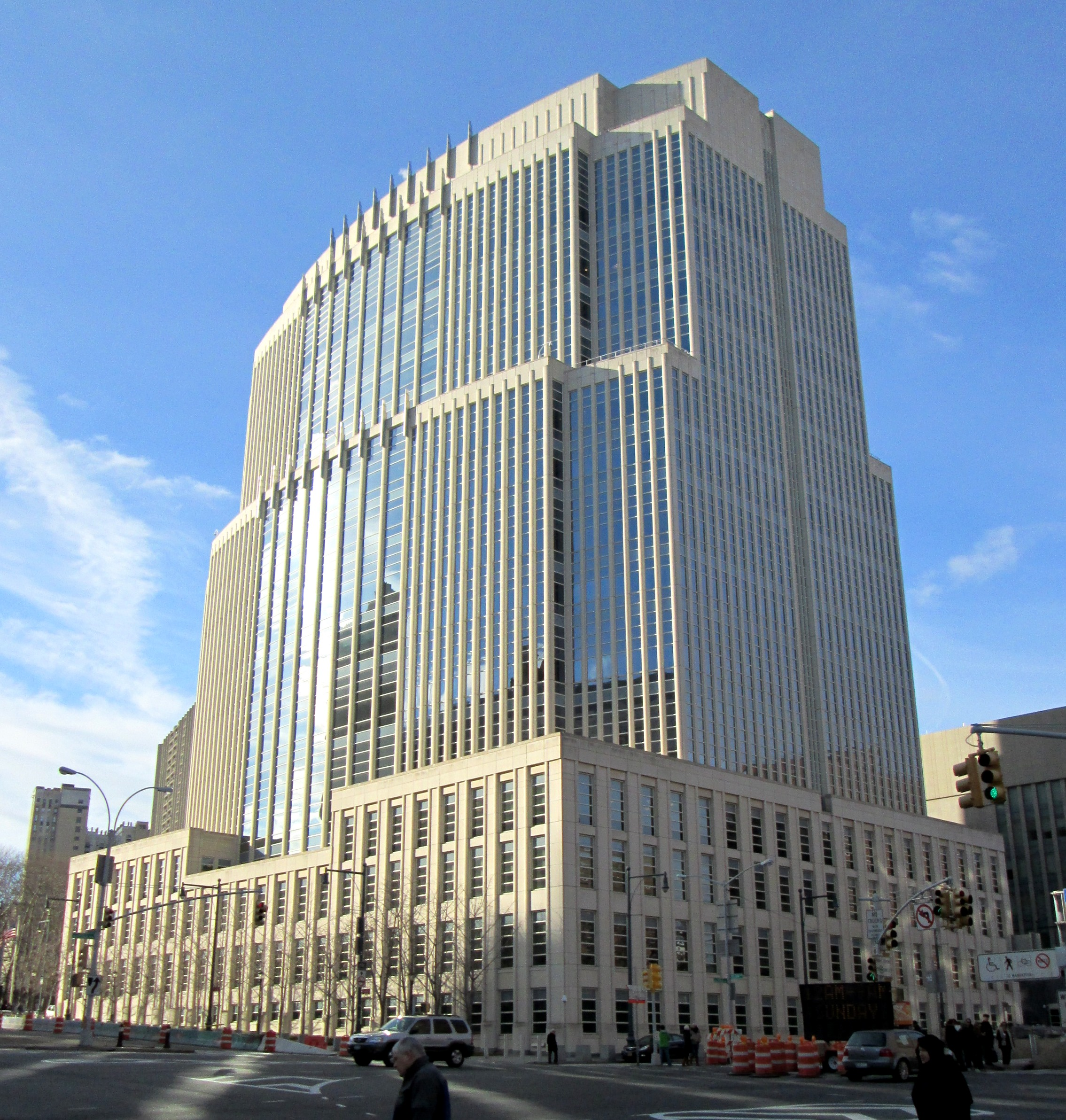
- Seen from Tillary Street and Brooklyn Bridge Boulevard in 2013
- Interactive map of the Theodore Roosevelt United States Courthouse area

General information
- Location: 225 Cadman Plaza East, Brooklyn, New York, 11201
- Coordinates: 40°41′49″N 73°59′22″W
- Current tenants: U.S. District Court for the Eastern District of New York
- Named for: Theodore Roosevelt
- Completed: 2006
- Owner: United States federal government

Technical details
- Floor count: 15
- Floor area: 750,000 square feet (70,000 m^{2})

Design and construction
- Architect: César Pelli

The Theodore Roosevelt United States Courthouse is a courthouse in Downtown Brooklyn, New York City, that houses the United States District Court for the Eastern District of New York. It is across the street from the Federal Building and Post Office, which houses, among other things, the Eastern District of New York's bankruptcy court.

== History ==
The courthouse stands on the location of the previous federal courthouse named the Emanuel Celler Federal Building. The previous courthouse, which was built in 1963, was a 6-story building that became unable to accommodate the court. This building underwent major renovations in 1999 under the direction of architect César Pelli. Upon its completion in 2006, the renovation had increased the number of floors to fifteen, bringing the total floor area to 750,000 square feet (70,000 m^{2}). The building contains 16 courtrooms and 9 magistrate courtrooms. The construction incorporated several extraordinary security features, such as having a structural frame that can withstand an explosion and having laminated glass face the exterior. On September 17, 2008, the courthouse was officially renamed in honor of Theodore Roosevelt with President George W. Bush signing into law legislation introduced by Senator Charles Schumer. A rededication ceremony was held on December 30 of that year.

Located on Cadman Plaza in Downtown Brooklyn, east of Brooklyn Heights, it is one of many federal buildings in the area whose construction and renovation has played a role in revitalizing Downtown Brooklyn. The courthouse is located at 225 Cadman Plaza East, across Tillary Street from the historic Federal Building and Post Office, which houses the Eastern District's bankruptcy court.

Along with the Alfonse M. D'Amato United States Courthouse in Central Islip, New York, the Theodore Roosevelt Courthouse houses the United States District Court for the Eastern District of New York. The Theodore Roosevelt Courthouse serves as its administrative headquarters.

== See also ==
- List of United States federal courthouses
- List of United States federal courthouses in New York
