= Brooklyn War Memorial =

War memorial in Brooklyn, New York, U.S.

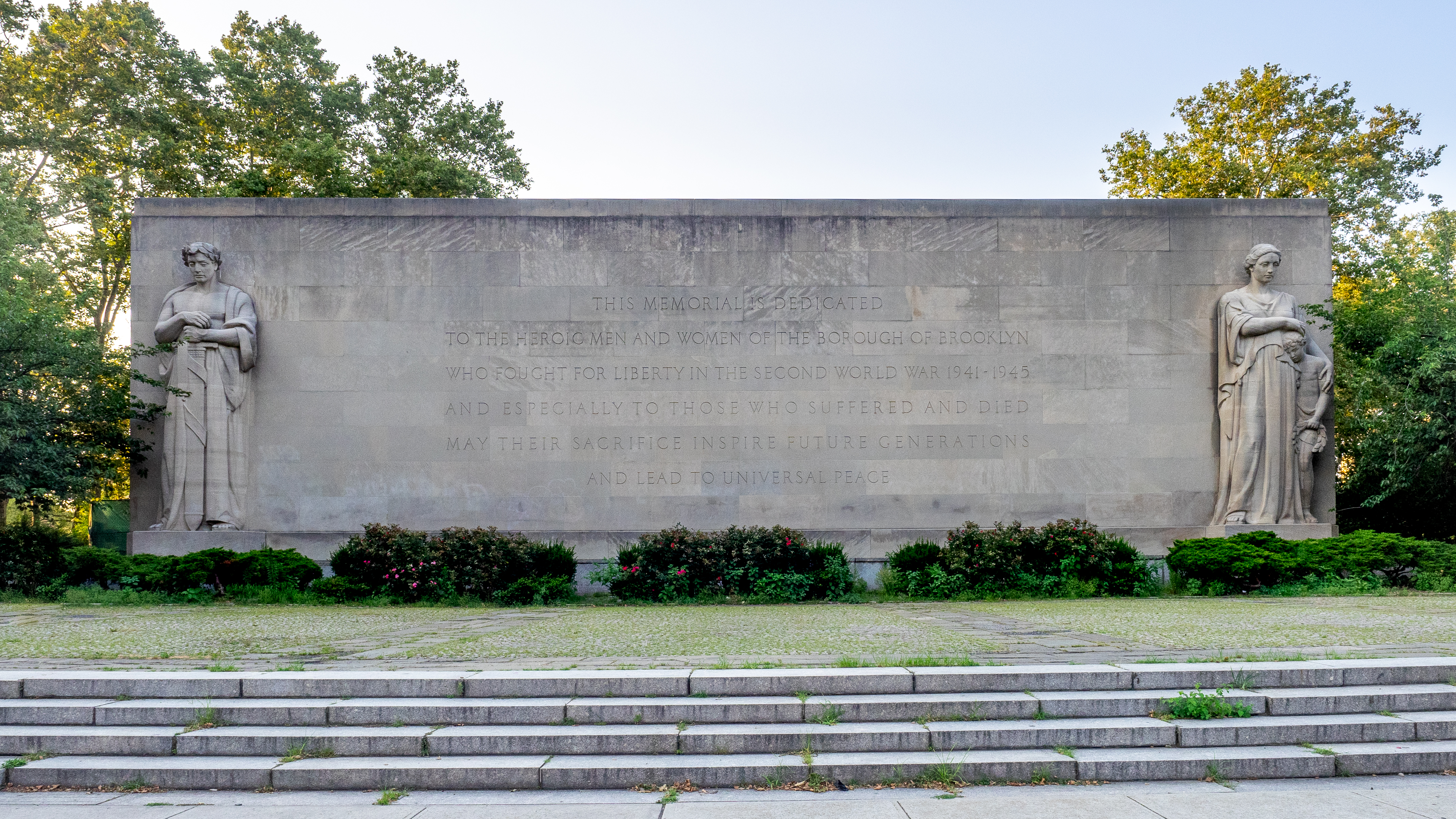
- Location: Brooklyn, New York City, New York, U.S.
- Coordinates: 40.69846°N 73.99066°W

The Brooklyn War Memorial is a war memorial installed in Brooklyn's Cadman Plaza, in the U.S. state of New York. It is dedicated to Brooklynites who served in World War II. It features two high relief figures sculpted by Charles Keck, which represent victory and family, as well as a memorial wall in its main auditorium. The memorial was dedicated in 1951, and later restored in 1977. It is currently in poor condition and closed to the public.

== Description and history ==
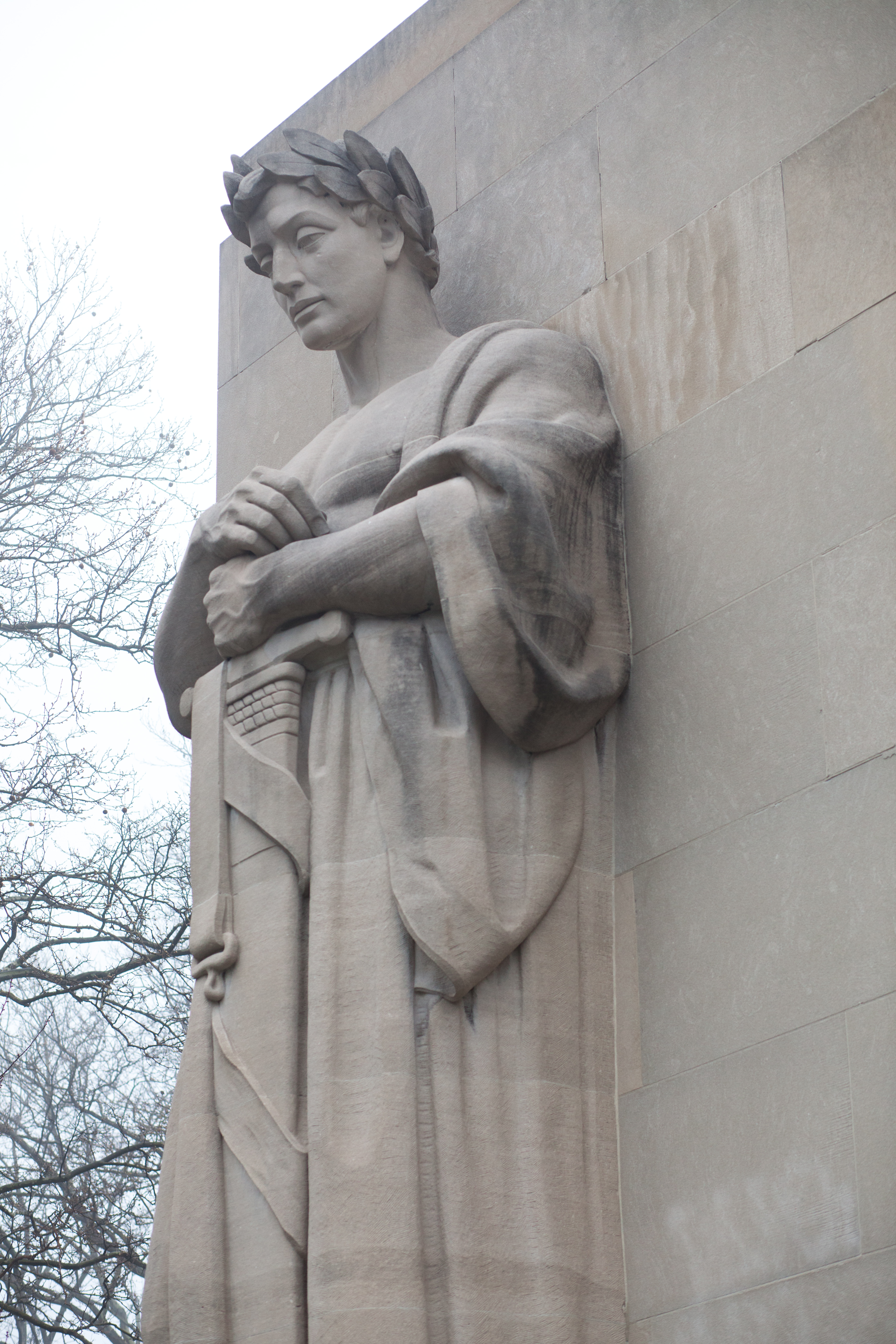
"Victory"

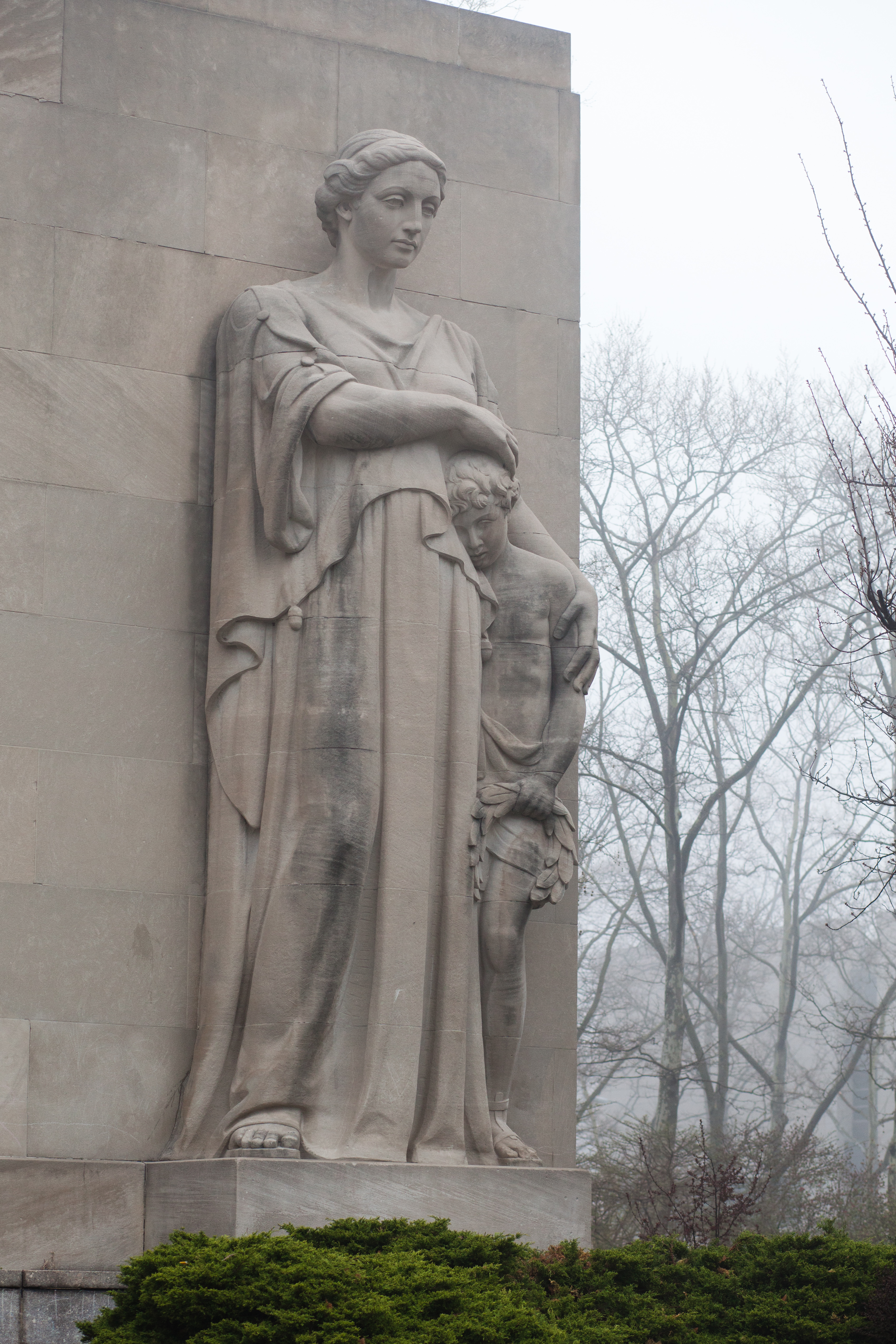
"Family"

Inspired by Parks Commissioner Robert Moses’s desire to provide a World War II monument to each borough, this monument was created. It is a granite and limestone 24-foot-tall (7.3 m) memorial designed by Stuart Constable, Gilmore D. Clarke, and W. Earle Andrews, who worked in concert with the architectural firm of Eggers and Higgins. The two larger-than-life sized high relief figures by sculptor Charles Keck (1875–1951) are located on the south facade, at opposite ends of the building. It honors Brooklynites who served in World War II. The full plan, however, was never fully built because of lack of funding.

At the time of its dedication, November 12, 1951, these were said to be the largest sculptures in New York City. Two figures representing Victory and Family stand to the sides of the inscription which reads:

This memorial is dedicated to the heroic men and women of the borough of Brooklyn who fought for liberty in the second world war 1941–1945 and especially to those who suffered and died may their sacrifice inspire future generations and lead to universal peace

The memorial includes a wall in the main auditorium inscribed with the names of 11,000 Brooklynites who died in the war. The area is now used for Parks Department storage and is closed to the public.

The War Memorial was restored in 1977 and was intended to serve as a community facility for veterans’ groups and arts organizations. The building was actively used by committees of Brooklyn Community Board 2, ceremonies by veterans’ groups, musical groups, theater groups, exercise classes and more. This stopped in the early 80s and only one organization is left in the building. The last active use of the building may have been by Brooklyn College for art exhibits. In May 2006, however, the organization was evicted. In the 1980s, the city began using the granite and limestone building basement for storage. Access is restricted. To view the plaques and list of names inside, relatives of World War II vets must make appointments.

The condition of the building is poor. The New York City Parks Department estimates the building needs $20 million for staffing and renovations, including a wheelchair-accessible entrance and air conditioning. In 1987, the chairman of Community Board 2 signed an agreement with the Parks Department allocating $540,000 for an elevator and other improvements to the memorial. This work was never done.
