= Statue of Christopher Columbus (Brooklyn) =

Statue of Christopher Columbus by Emma Stebbins in Brooklyn, New York, U.S.

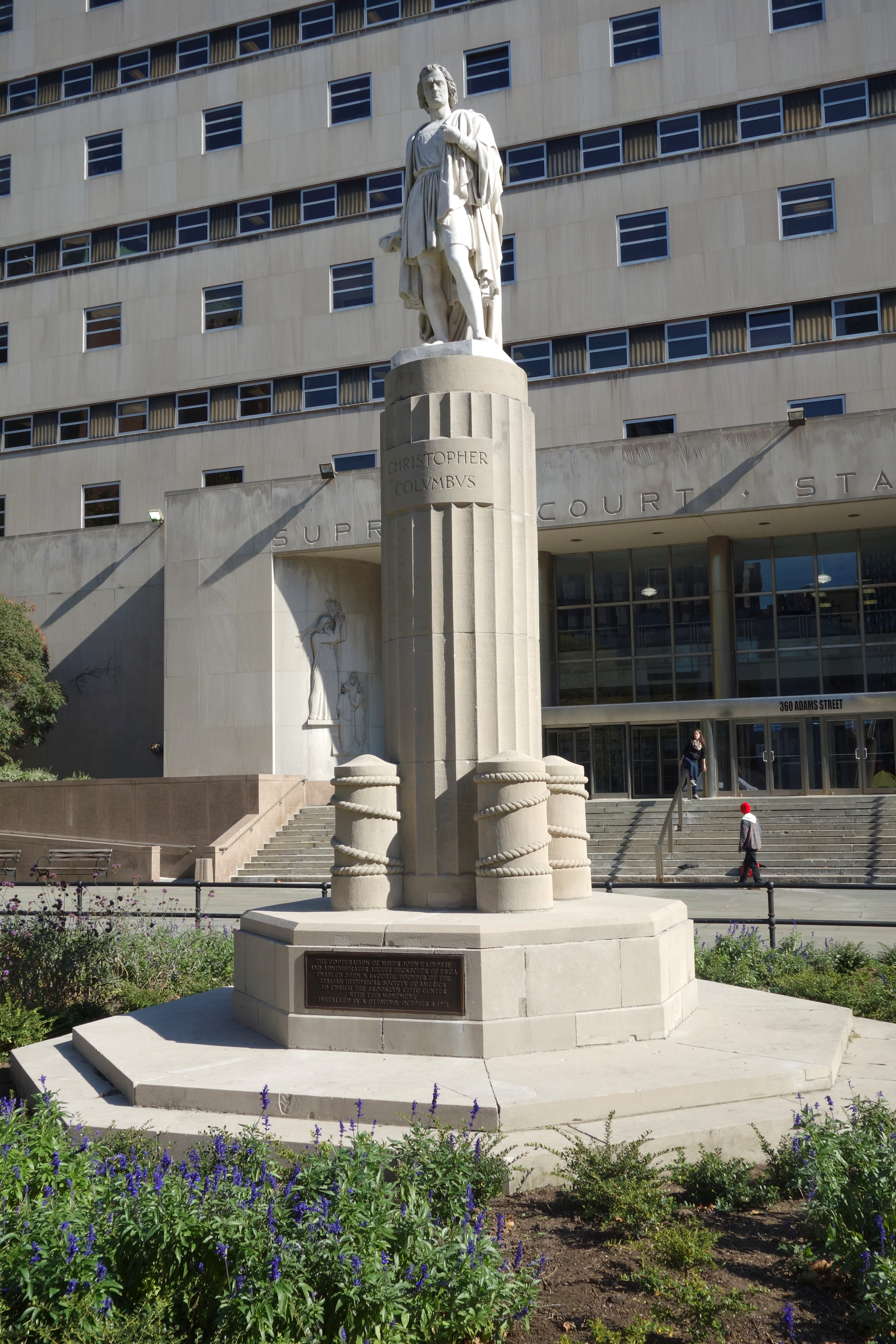
- Medium: Marble; limestone
- Subject: Christopher Columbus
- Location: New York City, New York, U.S.; 40.69391°N 73.98991°W

A statue of Christopher Columbus by artist Emma Stebbins and architect Aymar Embury II, also known as the Christopher Columbus Memorial, is installed outside the New York State Supreme Court in Brooklyn’s Columbus Park, in the U.S. state of New York. The memorial is made of Italian marble and limestone. It was cast c. 1867, and donated by Marshal O. Roberts.

== See also ==
- 1867 in art
- List of monuments and memorials to Christopher Columbus
