= Robert F. Kennedy Memorial (Brooklyn) =

Memorial to Robert F. Kennedy in Brooklyn, New York, U.S.

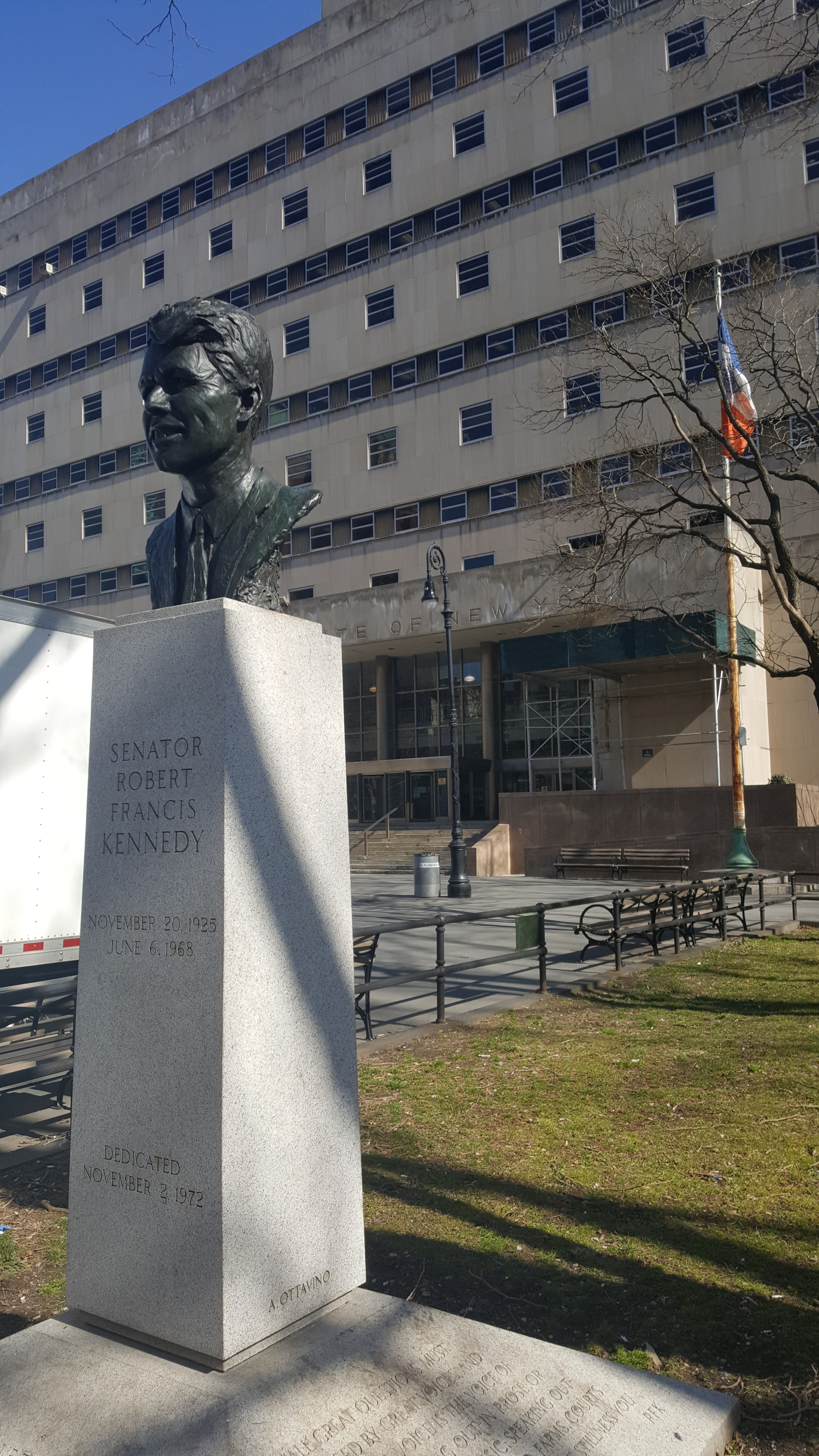
- The memorial in 2020
- Artist: Anneta Duveen
- Year: 1972
- Medium: Bronze; granite
- Subject: Robert F. Kennedy
- Location: New York City, New York, U.S.; 40.693704°N 73.989994°W

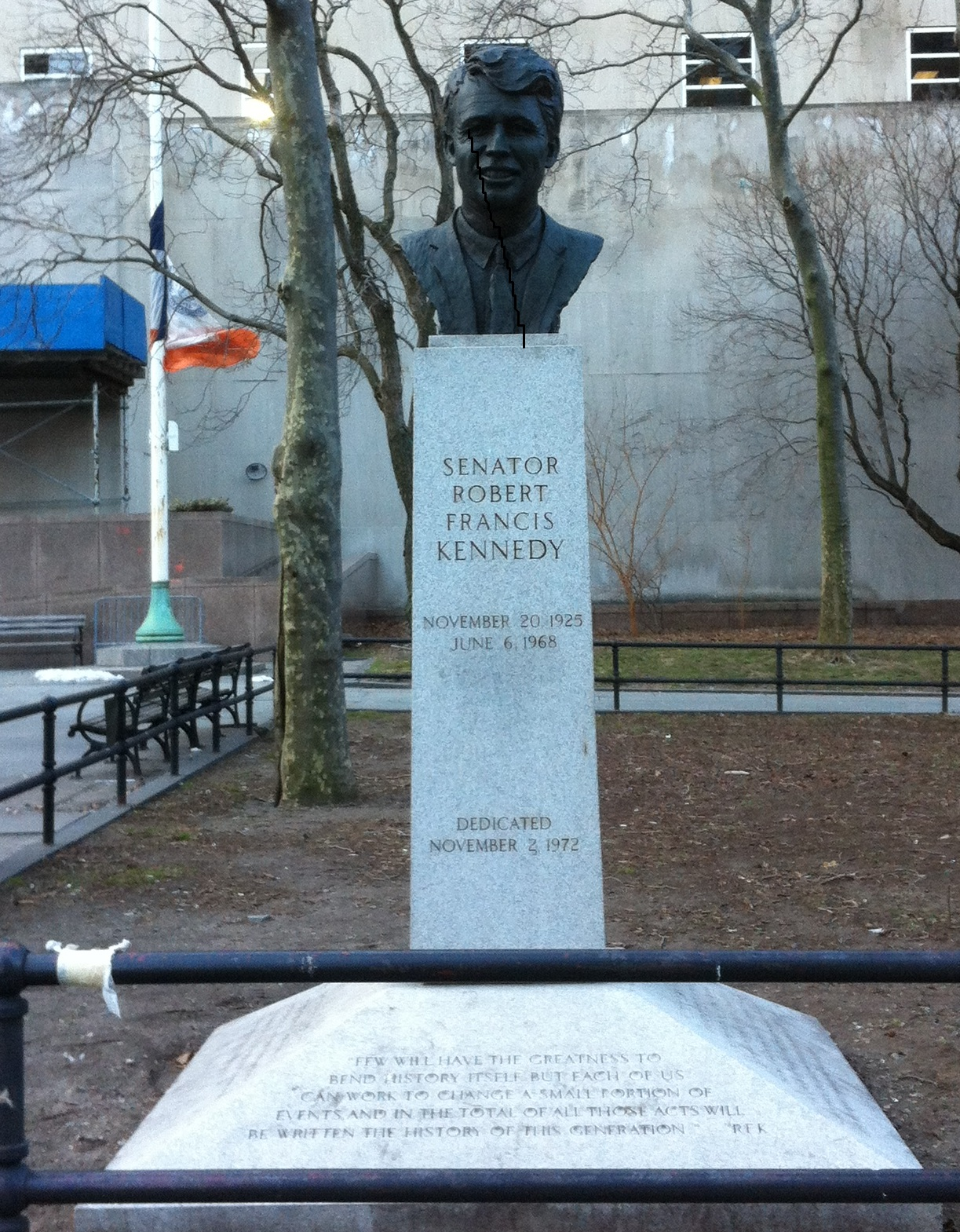
The Robert F. Kennedy Memorial (Brooklyn), view from the front, 2012

The Robert F. Kennedy Memorial is a memorial depicting Robert F. Kennedy by Anneta Duveen, installed outside the New York State Supreme Court building in Brooklyn's Columbus Park, in the U.S. state of New York. The memorial was cast in 1972, and dedicated on November 2 of that year.

It features a bronze bust resting on a Kitledge gray granite pedestal and base; the granite was mined from New Hampshire, and the pedestal is inscribed with four quotes by Kennedy.

== See also ==
- 1972 in art
