= Four Eagles =

Series of columns in Brooklyn, New York, U.S.

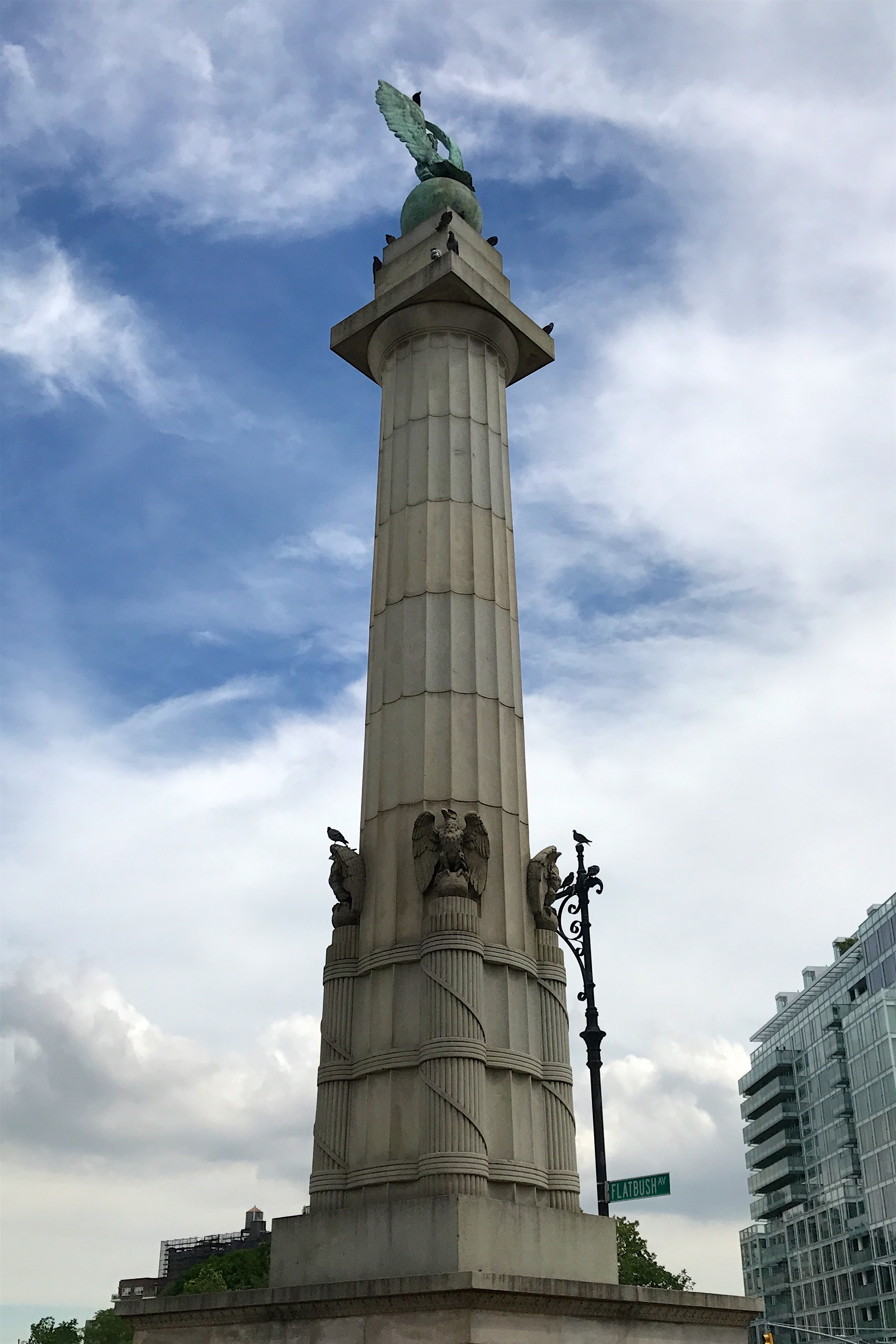
- One of the columns in 2017
- Artist: Frederick William MacMonnies (sculptor); Stanford White (architect)
- Location: New York City, New York, U.S.
- 40°40′20.2″N 73°58′11.1″W

Four Eagles is a series of four columns, each topped with sculptures of eagles, installed in Brooklyn's Grand Army Plaza, in the U.S. state of New York. The granite and bronze columns, designed by sculptor Frederick William MacMonnies and architect Stanford White, were cast and dedicated in 1901.
