= Cadman Plaza =

Plaza in Brooklyn, New York

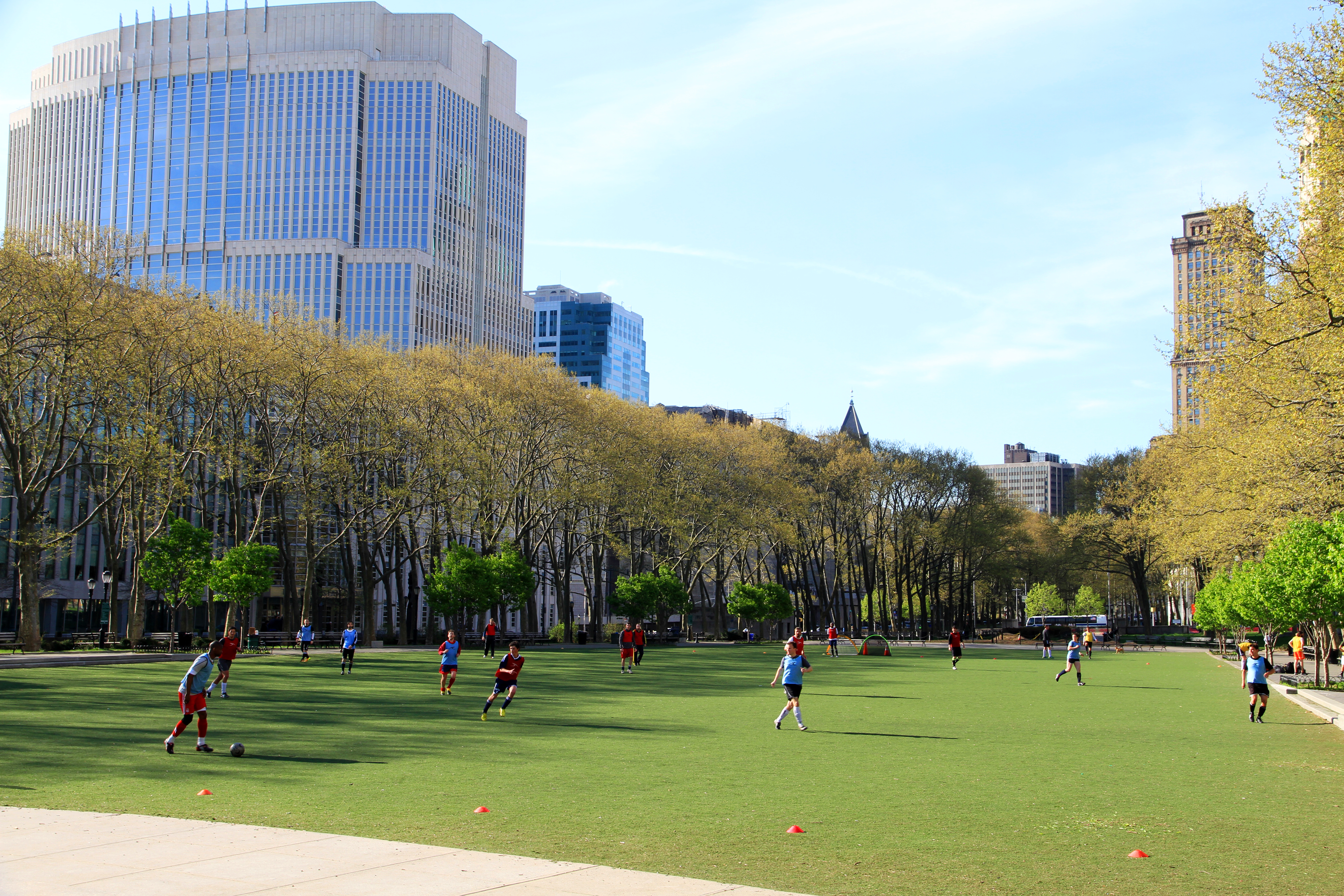
- Cadman Plaza Park with the Roosevelt Federal Courthouse to the left
- Interactive map of Cadman Plaza
- Coordinates: 40.698121°N 73.990431°W

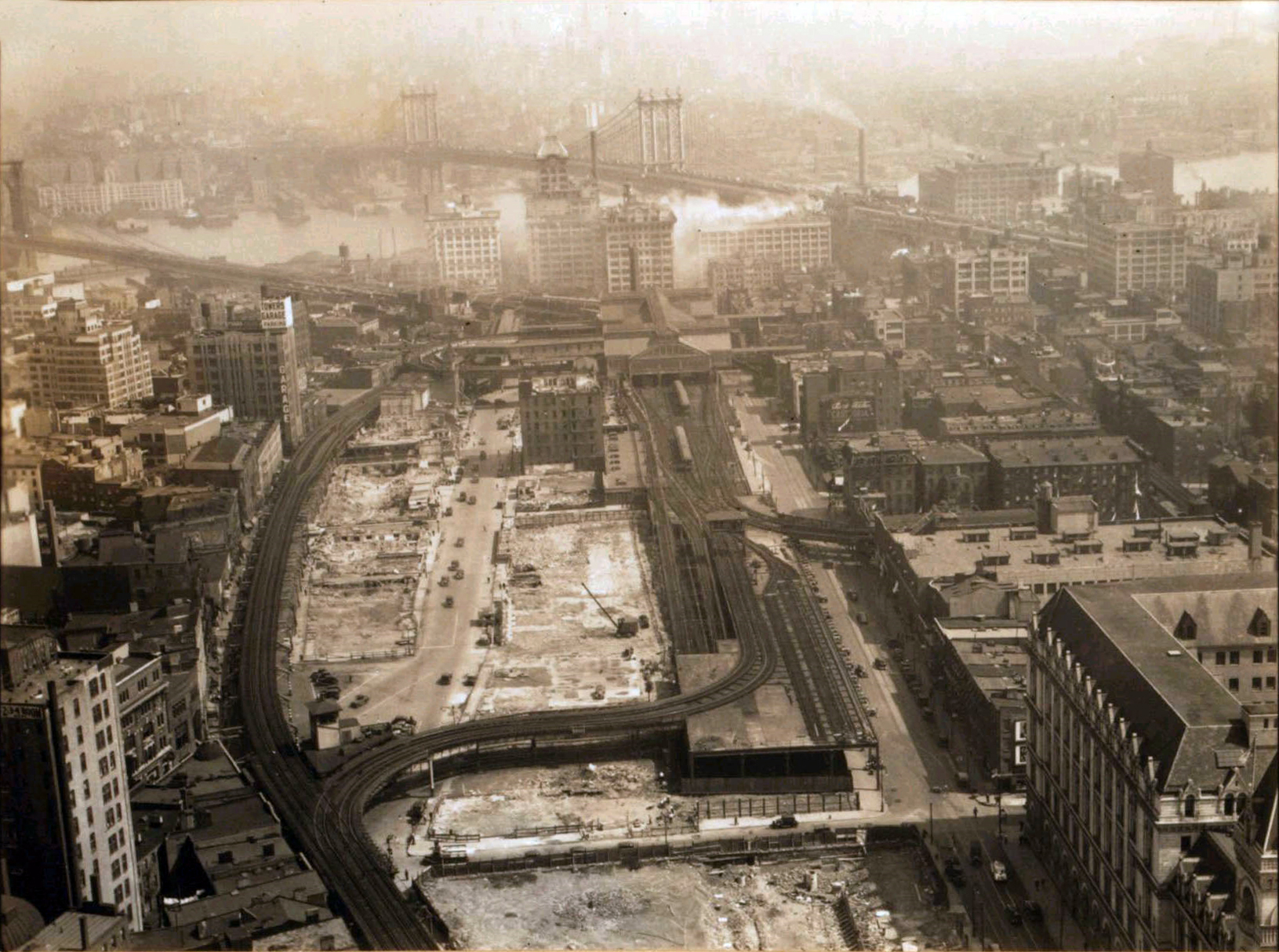
Building the future Plaza (1936)

Cadman Plaza is a park located on the border of the Brooklyn Heights and Downtown Brooklyn neighborhoods in Brooklyn, New York City. Named for Reverend Doctor Samuel Parkes Cadman (1864–1936), a renowned minister in the Brooklyn Congregational Church, it is built on land reclaimed by condemnation in 1935 and was named as a park in 1939. The park borders Cadman Plaza West and Cadman Plaza East and the west and east sides of the plaza, respectively.

The Brooklyn War Memorial and William Jay Gaynor Memorial are installed in the park.

== Location ==
The plaza is bounded by Cadman Plaza East (formerly Washington Street) and Cadman Plaza West (formerly Ferry Road or Fulton Road), and by the Brooklyn Bridge on the north and Tillary Street on the south. East of the park is the Theodore Roosevelt United States Courthouse. South of this park, between Tillary and Johnson Streets, lies the small Korean War Veterans Plaza. South of Johnson, the Kings County Supreme Court Building and Columbus Park, featuring a statue of Christopher Columbus, sit on land formerly used as a station for trolley cars. These parks, together with Walt Whitman Park, form a mall from Brooklyn Borough Hall to the Brooklyn Bridge. In 2015, a "Brooklyn Strand" was proposed to unite these parks.
