= Judge Hurley =

Judge Hurley may refer to:

- Daniel T. K. Hurley (born 1943), judge of the United States District Court for the Southern District of Florida
- Denis Reagan Hurley (born 1937), judge of the United States District Court for the Eastern District of New York
