= Ellsworth Van Graafeiland =

American judge (1915–2004)

Senior Judge of the United States Court of Appeals for the Second Circuit
- In office May 11, 1985 – November 20, 2004

Judge of the United States Court of Appeals for the Second Circuit
- In office December 21, 1974 – May 11, 1985
- Appointed by: Gerald Ford
- Preceded by: Henry Friendly
- Succeeded by: Frank Altimari

Personal details
- Born: Ellsworth Alfred Van Graafeiland; May 11, 1915 Rochester, New York, U.S.
- Died: November 20, 2004 (aged 89) Rochester, New York, U.S.
- Education: University of Rochester (BA); Cornell University (LLB)

Ellsworth Alfred Van Graafeiland (May 11, 1915 – November 20, 2004) was a United States circuit judge of the United States Court of Appeals for the Second Circuit.

== Education and career ==
Van Graafeiland was born on May 11, 1915, in Rochester, New York. His father was a clothing cutter. He first enrolled at the Cornell School of Agriculture with just $15 in his pockets, but transferred to the University of Rochester after receiving a job as a cashier at Walgreens, at a time when jobs were scarce. He received a Bachelor of Arts degree from the University of Rochester in 1937 and a Bachelor of Laws from Cornell Law School in 1940. Van Graafeiland was an attorney in private practice in Rochester from 1940 to 1974, starting at the firm that became Wiser, Shaw, Freeman, Van Graafeiland, Harter and Secrest.

== Federal judicial service ==
At the recommendation of United States Senator James L. Buckley, Van Graafeiland was nominated by President Gerald Ford on December 11, 1974, to a seat on the United States Court of Appeals for the Second Circuit located in New York City and vacated by Judge Henry Friendly. He was confirmed by the United States Senate on December 20, 1974, and received his commission on December 21, 1974. He assumed senior status on May 11, 1985. His service terminated on November 20, 2004, due to his death in Rochester.

=== Notable clerk ===
In 1979, Jerome Powell clerked for Van Graafeiland.

=== Opinions ===
Van Graafeiland was among the first federal judges to challenge the constitutionality of affirmative action regulations that involved quotas.

In 1975, he wrote the opinion in a decision that rejected a racial quota that a lower court had imposed on promotions in the Correctional Services Department of New York State, opining that racial quotas were "reverse discrimination" and "repugnant to the basic concepts of a democratic society".

One of his judgments in 1976 reversed a court-ordered racial quota for school principals in New York City, opining that it was "constitutionally forbidden reverse discrimination."

In a 1978 case, Van Graafeiland endorsed stringent narcotics laws adopted under Governor Nelson A. Rockefeller. That appeal reversed a decision by Judge Constance Baker Motley of the United States District Court for the Southern District of New York, who had previously ruled that New York State sentences of up to life in prison for the sale of small amounts of narcotics were unconstitutionally severe.

In other opinions, Van Graafeiland criticized mandatory sentencing laws as inhuman, affirmed the rights of musicians to deduct the costs of practice rooms from their taxes in a ruling against the Internal Revenue Service (Drucker v. Commissioner, 1983), and found that the Muppets did not libel Spam (Hormel Foods Corporation v. Jim Henson Productions, 1986).

== Personal life ==
Van Graafeiland was limited in his mobility due to a cast that he wore for scoliosis. He was known by friends as "Van". He was a piano player and composed the alma mater song in high school. He was married to Rosemary Vaeth Van Graafeiland and had five children.

Legal offices
Preceded by Henry Friendly	Judge of the United States Court of Appeals for the Second Circuit; 1974–1985	Succeeded by Frank Altimari
