= Reena Raggi =

American judge (born 1951)

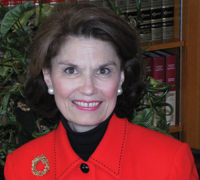

Senior Judge of the United States Court of Appeals for the Second Circuit
- Incumbent
- Assumed office August 31, 2018

Judge of the United States Court of Appeals for the Second Circuit
- In office October 4, 2002 – August 31, 2018
- Appointed by: George W. Bush
- Preceded by: Amalya Kearse
- Succeeded by: Joseph F. Bianco

Judge of the United States District Court for the Eastern District of New York
- In office May 7, 1987 – October 4, 2002
- Appointed by: Ronald Reagan
- Preceded by: Frank Altimari
- Succeeded by: Dora Irizarry

Personal details
- Born: Reena Andrea Raggi; May 11, 1951 (age 75) Jersey City, New Jersey, U.S.
- Spouse: David Denton (m. 1983)
- Education: Wellesley College (BA); Harvard University (JD)

Reena Andrea Raggi (born May 11, 1951) is a senior United States circuit judge of the United States Court of Appeals for the Second Circuit and maintains her chambers in Brooklyn, New York. She was formerly a United States district judge of the United States District Court for the Eastern District of New York.

== Education and background ==
Raggi earned her Bachelor of Arts degree from Wellesley College in 1973, where she was elected to Phi Beta Kappa. She later earned her Juris Doctor from Harvard Law School, where she served as a member of the Board of Student Advisers, graduating cum laude in 1976. Following her graduation from law school in 1976, she served for a year as a law clerk for Judge Thomas E. Fairchild of the United States Court of Appeals for the Seventh Circuit.

She was admitted to the bar in New York, and joined the Manhattan law firm of Cahill Gordon & Reindel until her appointment as an Assistant United States Attorney for the Eastern District of New York in 1979, serving in that capacity until her appointment in 1986 as Interim U.S. Attorney. Later that year, she returned to private law practice at the New York City law firm of Windels, Marx, Davies, and Ives.

== Federal judicial service ==
=== District court service ===
President Ronald Reagan nominated Raggi to the United States District Court for the Eastern District of New York on January 20, 1987, to a seat vacated by Judge Frank Altimari, who was elevated to the United States Court of Appeals for the Second Circuit on December 11, 1985. She was confirmed on May 7, 1987. She received her commission on the same day. She was the first woman to serve on the 14-member bench in the Eastern District of New York and, at 35 years old, one of the youngest federal judges in the United States. Raggi presided over the Golden Venture trial, in which a ship carrying around 300 would-be immigrants from China crash-landed on a sandbar off Queens, New York, in June 1993. Her service as a district court judge was terminated on October 7, 2002, when she was elevated to the court of appeals.

=== Court of appeals service ===
President George W. Bush nominated Raggi for the Second Circuit on May 1, 2002, to replace Judge Amalya Kearse, who assumed senior status on June 11, 2002. She was confirmed by the United States Senate on September 20, 2002, by a 85–0 vote. She received her commission on October 4, 2002. She assumed senior status on August 31, 2018.

Raggi is known for her aggressive questioning of lawyers from the bench.

Legal offices
Preceded by Frank Altimari	Judge of the United States District Court for the Eastern District of New York; 1987–2002	Succeeded by Dora Irizarry
Preceded by Amalya Kearse	Judge of the United States Court of Appeals for the Second Circuit; 2002–2018	Succeeded by Joseph F. Bianco
