= Frank Altimari =

American judge (1928–1998)

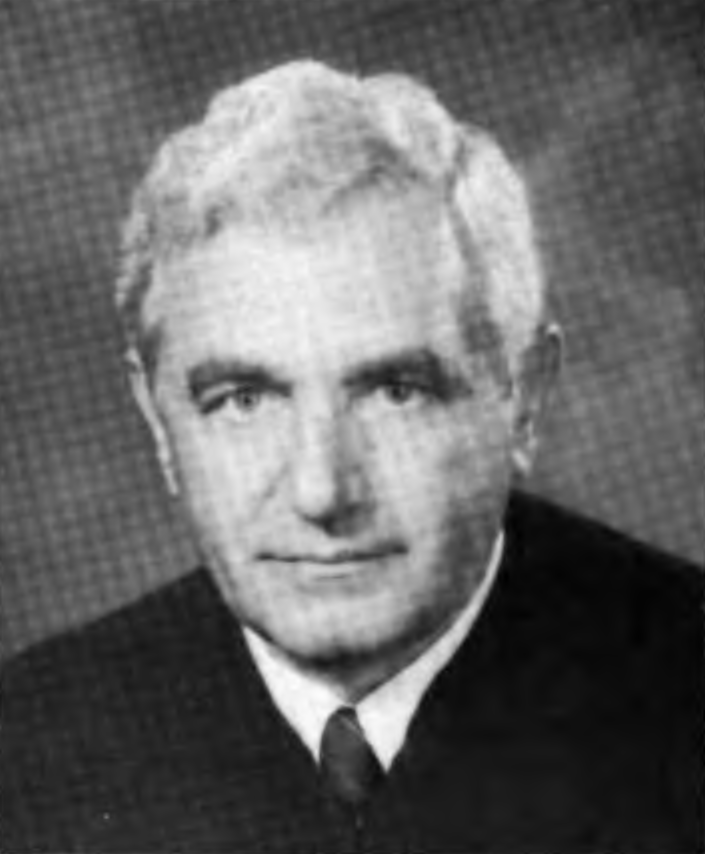

Senior Judge of the United States Court of Appeals for the Second Circuit
- In office January 1, 1996 – July 19, 1998

Judge of the United States Court of Appeals for the Second Circuit
- In office December 17, 1985 – January 1, 1996
- Appointed by: Ronald Reagan
- Preceded by: Ellsworth Van Graafeiland
- Succeeded by: Rosemary S. Pooler

Judge of the United States District Court for the Eastern District of New York
- In office December 10, 1982 – December 23, 1985
- Appointed by: Ronald Reagan
- Preceded by: Edward Raymond Neaher
- Succeeded by: Reena Raggi

Personal details
- Born: Frank Xavier Altimari; September 24, 1928 Queens, New York, U.S.
- Died: July 19, 1998 (aged 69) Old Westbury, New York, U.S.
- Education: St. Francis College; Brooklyn Law School (LLB)

Frank Xavier Altimari (September 4, 1928 – July 19, 1998) was a United States circuit judge of the United States Court of Appeals for the Second Circuit and previously was a United States District Judge of the United States District Court for the Eastern District of New York.

== Education and career ==
Born in Queens, New York, Altimari attended St. Francis College in Brooklyn. He received a Bachelor of Laws from Brooklyn Law School in 1951. He served as an attorney in private practice in Jamaica, New York from 1951 to 1965. During this period, he also was a law professor at St. Francis College from 1954 to 1963, and served on the school board in Westbury, New York from 1963 to 1965.

== State judicial service ==
Altimari's judicial career began when he was elected to the Nassau County District Court in 1965. After serving on that court for four years, he was elected to the Nassau County Court for a term beginning in 1970 and then as a justice of the New York State Supreme Court (the trial court of New York), on which he served from 1974 to 1982. He also again taught at St. Francis College from 1972 to 1973.

== Federal judicial service ==
Altimari was nominated by President Ronald Reagan on November 23, 1982, to a seat on the United States District Court for the Eastern District of New York vacated by Judge Edward Raymond Neaher. He was confirmed by the United States Senate on December 10, 1982, and received his commission on December 10, 1982. His service terminated on December 23, 1985, due to his elevation to the court of appeals.

Altimari was nominated by President Reagan on October 23, 1985, to a seat on the United States Court of Appeals for the Second Circuit vacated by Judge Ellsworth Van Graafeiland. He was confirmed by the Senate on December 16, 1985, and received his commission on December 17, 1985. He assumed senior status on January 1, 1996. His service terminated on July 19, 1998, due to his death of brain cancer in Old Westbury, New York.

== Sources ==
Legal offices
Preceded by Edward Raymond Neaher	Judge of the United States District Court for the Eastern District of New York; 1982–1985	Succeeded by Reena Raggi
Preceded by Ellsworth Van Graafeiland	Judge of the United States Court of Appeals for the Second Circuit; 1985–1996	Succeeded by Rosemary S. Pooler
