= Joseph F. Bianco =

American judge (born 1966)

Joseph Bianco
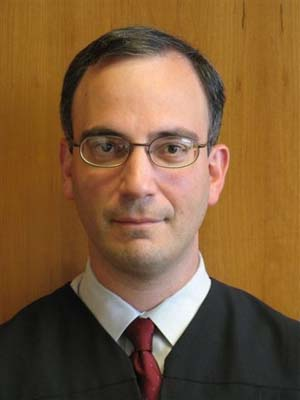

Judge of the United States Court of Appeals for the Second Circuit
- Incumbent
- Assumed office May 13, 2019
- Appointed by: Donald Trump
- Preceded by: Reena Raggi

Judge of the United States District Court for the Eastern District of New York
- In office January 3, 2006 – May 17, 2019
- Appointed by: George W. Bush
- Preceded by: Denis Reagan Hurley
- Succeeded by: Nusrat Jahan Choudhury

Personal details
- Born: Joseph Frank Bianco; September 11, 1966 (age 59) New York City, New York, U.S.
- Children: 6
- Education: Georgetown University (BA); Columbia University (JD); Seminary of the Immaculate Conception (MA)

Joseph Frank Bianco (born September 11, 1966) is an American lawyer and jurist who has been a judge of the United States Court of Appeals for the Second Circuit since 2019. He was formerly a United States district judge of the United States District Court for the Eastern District of New York.

== Early life and education ==
Bianco was born on September 11, 1966, in Flushing, Queens. He graduated from Georgetown University in 1988 with a Bachelor of Arts, magna cum laude. He then attended Columbia Law School, where he was an editor of the Columbia Law Review. He graduated in 1991 with a Juris Doctor.

Later in his career, Bianco earned a Master of Arts from the Seminary of the Immaculate Conception in 2013, and is an ordained Roman Catholic deacon.

== Career ==
Bianco was a law clerk to Judge Peter K. Leisure of the United States District Court for the Southern District of New York from 1992 to 1993. He then became an associate at Simpson, Thacher & Bartlett, where he worked for one year.

From 1994 to 2003, Bianco served as an assistant United States attorney for the Southern District of New York. In 2003 and 2004, he was counsel at Debevoise & Plimpton. Before becoming a judge, Bianco was senior counsel and a deputy assistant attorney general in the United States Department of Justice Criminal Division.

Bianco taught as an adjunct professor at Fordham University School of Law from 2002 to 2004. From 2009 to 2013, he was an adjunct at the Maurice A. Deane School of Law. He was an adjunct professor of law at Touro Law Center from 2007 to 2014. In 2006, he became an adjunct at the St. John's University School of Law. He has been a member of the Federalist Society since 2004.

=== District court ===
Bianco is a former United States district judge of the United States District Court for the Eastern District of New York. Bianco was nominated by President George W. Bush on July 28, 2005, to a seat vacated by Denis Reagan Hurley. He was confirmed unanimously by the United States Senate on December 21, 2005, and received his commission on January 3, 2006. As a district court judge, Bianco oversaw a number of murder cases against MS-13 gang members. His service on the district court terminated upon his elevation to the court of appeals on May 17, 2019.

=== Court of appeals ===
On October 10, 2018, President Donald Trump announced his intent to nominate Bianco to the United States Court of Appeals for the Second Circuit. On November 13, 2018, his nomination was sent to the Senate. Trump nominated Bianco to the seat vacated by Judge Reena Raggi, who assumed senior status on August 31, 2018. Also on November 13, 2018, the American Bar Association unanimously rated Bianco as "Well Qualified," its highest rating.

On January 3, 2019, his nomination was returned to the President under Rule XXXI, Paragraph 6 of the United States Senate. On January 23, 2019, Trump announced his intent to renominate Bianco to a federal judgeship. His nomination was sent to the Senate later that day. On February 13, 2019, a hearing on his nomination was held before the Senate Judiciary Committee. On March 7, 2019, his nomination was reported out of committee by a 12–10 vote. On May 6, 2019, the Senate invoked cloture on his nomination by a 51–40 vote. On May 8, 2019, his nomination was confirmed by a 54–42 vote. He received his judicial commission on May 13, 2019.

== Personal life ==
Bianco is married and has six children.

Legal offices
Preceded by Denis Reagan Hurley	Judge of the United States District Court for the Eastern District of New York; 2006–2019	Succeeded by Nusrat Jahan Choudhury
Preceded by Reena Raggi	Judge of the United States Court of Appeals for the Second Circuit; 2019–present	Incumbent
