= Clarence G. Galston =

American judge

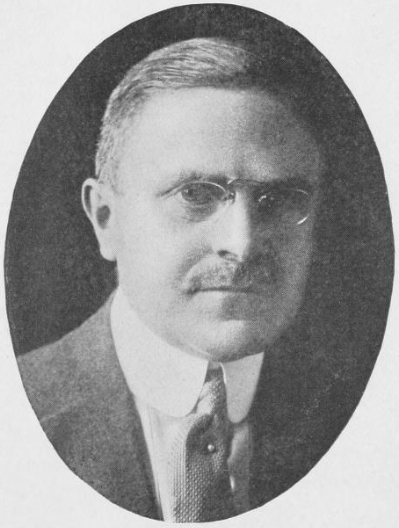

Senior Judge of the United States District Court for the Eastern District of New York
- In office January 1, 1957 – January 22, 1964

Judge of the United States District Court for the Eastern District of New York
- In office April 29, 1929 – January 1, 1957
- Appointed by: Herbert Hoover
- Preceded by: Seat established by 45 Stat. 1409
- Succeeded by: Joseph Carmine Zavatt

Personal details
- Born: April 18, 1876 New York City, US
- Died: January 22, 1964 (aged 87) Woodmere, New York, US
- Education: City College of New York (B.S.); New York University School of Law (LL.B.); New York University (A.M.)

Clarence G. Galston (April 18, 1876 – January 22, 1964) was a United States district judge of the United States District Court for the Eastern District of New York.

== Education and career ==
Born in New York City, Galston received a Bachelor of Science degree from the City College of New York in 1895, a Bachelor of Laws from the New York University School of Law in 1899 and an Artium Magister degree from New York University in 1900. He was in private practice in New York City from 1899 to 1929, and was special counsel on patent matters for the City of New York from 1912 to 1929. He was President of Woodmere Academy in Woodmere, New York from 1914 to 1929.

== Federal judicial service ==
Galston was nominated by President Herbert Hoover on April 18, 1929, to the United States District Court for the Eastern District of New York, to a new seat authorized by 45 Stat. 1409. He was confirmed by the United States Senate on April 29, 1929, and received his commission the same day. He assumed senior status on January 1, 1957. His service terminated on January 22, 1964, due to his death in Woodmere.

== Memoirs ==
Galston wrote a memoir of his judicial service, Behind the Judicial Curtain, published in 1959.

== Sources ==
Legal offices
Preceded by Seat established by 45 Stat. 1409	Judge of the United States District Court for the Eastern District of New York; 1929–1957	Succeeded by Joseph Carmine Zavatt
