= Nusrat Jahan Choudhury =

American judge (born 1976)

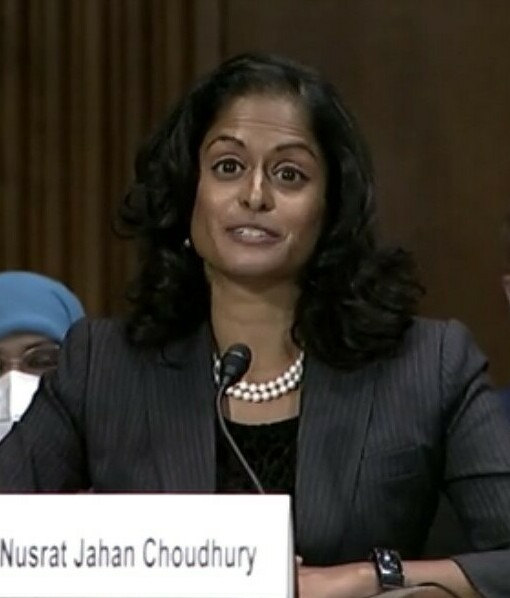

Judge of the United States District Court for the Eastern District of New York
- Incumbent
- Assumed office July 5, 2023
- Appointed by: Joe Biden
- Preceded by: Joseph F. Bianco

Personal details
- Born: 1976 (age 49–50) Chicago, Illinois, U.S.
- Education: Columbia University (BA); Princeton University (MPA); Yale University (JD)

Nusrat Jahan Choudhury (Bengali: নুসরত জাহান চৌধুরী; born 1976) is an American lawyer who serves as a United States district judge of the United States District Court for the Eastern District of New York.

== Education ==
Choudhury earned a Bachelor of Arts from Columbia University in 1998, a Master of Public Administration from the Princeton School of Public and International Affairs in 2006, and a Juris Doctor from Yale Law School in 2006.

== Career ==
Choudhury began her career as a law clerk for Judge Denise Cote of the United States District Court for the Southern District of New York from 2006 to 2007 and Judge Barrington D. Parker Jr. of the United States Court of Appeals for the Second Circuit from 2007 to 2008. She worked at the national ACLU based in New York City from 2008 to 2020. She worked as a staff attorney for the ACLU National Security Project and Racial Justice Program during her time there. From 2020 to 2023, she was the legal director of the American Civil Liberties Union of Illinois.

=== Federal judicial service ===
On January 19, 2022, President Joe Biden nominated Choudhury to serve as a United States district judge of the United States District Court for the Eastern District of New York. President Biden nominated Choudhury to the seat vacated by Judge Joseph F. Bianco, who was elevated to the United States Court of Appeals for the Second Circuit on May 17, 2019.

On April 27, 2022, a hearing on her nomination was held before the Senate Judiciary Committee. During her confirmation hearing, she was asked whether she had said "the killing of unarmed Black men by police happens every day in America." Choudhury at first testified she was not sure she made that statement but then said she "said it in my role as an advocate." Her testimony caused several law enforcement groups, including the Fraternal Order of Police and the Sergeants Benevolent Association, to oppose her nomination. Two weeks after her hearing, Choudhury sent a letter to the Judiciary Committee denying that she had made the statement. Republicans on the Judiciary Committee requested a second hearing due to Choudhury's contradictory statements, but Senator Dick Durbin rejected the request for a second hearing. On May 26, 2022, her nomination was reported out of the committee by a 12–10 vote. On January 3, 2023, her nomination was returned to the President under Rule XXXI, Paragraph 6 of the United States Senate; she was renominated later the same day. On February 9, 2023, her nomination was reported out of committee by an 11–10 party line vote. On June 14, 2023, the Senate invoked cloture on her nomination by a 50–47 vote, with Senator Joe Manchin voting against the motion to invoke cloture on her nomination. On June 15, 2023, her nomination was confirmed by a 50–49 vote, with Senator Joe Manchin voting against confirmation because her "previous statements call into question her ability to be unbiased towards the work of our brave law enforcement." Choudhury is the third ACLU lawyer to be confirmed directly to the federal bench as an Article III judge after Ruth Bader Ginsburg in 1980 and Dale Ho one day prior on June 14, 2023. She received her judicial commission on July 5, 2023. Choudhury became the first Muslim woman and first Bangladeshi American to serve as a federal judge.

==== Notable rulings ====
On April 4, 2024, she denied Nassau County's attempt to dismiss New York Attorney General Letitia James's challenge to the county's ban on transgender players from women's and girls teams.

== Personal life ==
Choudhury's father won a Fulbright grant to come to the United States and worked in the Chicago area for 40 years as a physician. Choudhury married Michael Early, a visual effects producer, in 2016.

== See also ==
- Joe Biden judicial appointment controversies
- List of Asian American jurists

Legal offices
Preceded by Joseph F. Bianco	Judge of the United States District Court for the Eastern District of New York; 2023–present	Incumbent
