= Windels Marx Lane & Mittendorf =

Full-service law firm headquartered in New York City

Windels Marx Lane & Mittendorf LLP
- Headquarters: CitySpire Center, New York
- No. of offices: 4
- No. of attorneys: 140+
- Major practice areas: General practice
- Key people: Robert J. Luddy; Managing Partner
- Date founded: c. 1830
- Company type: Limited Liability Partnership
- Website: www.windelsmarx.com

Windels Marx is a full-service law firm headquartered in New York City. The firm offers a broad range of legal services, focusing on corporate, bankruptcy, litigation, real estate, banking, and other major business practice areas.

== History ==
The firm was established through a merger between Windels, Marx, Davies & Ives—a law firm dating back to the 1830s, and Lane & Mittendorf. In its early years, the firm provided several significant legal representations, such as defending Thomas Edison's ownership of the lightbulb patent and handling the original incorporation of IBM in the 1920s.

As of 2016, the firm employs approximately 140 legal professionals in four offices, headquartered in the CitySpire Center in New York City, with additional locations in Connecticut and New Jersey.

== Recognition ==
The firm is consistently ranked among the top law firms in U.S. News & World Report's annual rankings, particularly recognized for its Banking and Finance practice groups, as well as its Bankruptcy practice.

Windels Marx is regularly featured in the Forbes Legal Blackbook, a directory of prestigious law firms known for providing essential legal services to prominent U.S. and global corporations.

== Notable professionals ==
Reena Raggi, United States Circuit Judge of the U.S. Court of Appeals for the Second Circuit, was previously a partner at Windels Marx.

Anthony R. Coscia, a partner at the firm, has served as Chairman of the National Railroad Passenger Corporation (Amtrak) and the Port Authority of New York and New Jersey.
