= Joseph Carmine Zavatt =

American judge (1900–1985)

Senior Judge of the United States District Court for the Eastern District of New York
- In office December 31, 1970 – August 31, 1985

Chief Judge of the United States District Court for the Eastern District of New York
- In office 1962–1969
- Preceded by: Walter Bruchhausen
- Succeeded by: Jacob Mishler

Judge of the United States District Court for the Eastern District of New York
- In office August 7, 1957 – December 31, 1970
- Appointed by: Dwight D. Eisenhower
- Preceded by: Clarence G. Galston
- Succeeded by: Edward Raymond Neaher

Personal details
- Born: Joseph Carmine Zavatto; September 19, 1900 Lawrence, New York
- Died: August 31, 1985 (aged 84)
- Education: Columbia University (B.A.); Columbia Law School (LL.B.)

Joseph Carmine Zavatt (September 19, 1900 – August 31, 1985) was a United States district judge of the United States District Court for the Eastern District of New York from 1957 to 1985 and its Chief Judge from 1962 to 1969.

== Education and career ==
Born on September 19, 1900, in Lawrence, Nassau County, New York, Zavatt was the son of Vincent Zavatto, a real estate professional and author who immigrated to the United States from San Martino di Finita, Italy in 1892. Zavatto later changed his name to "Zavatt" after a teacher misspelled it making his name more "American." Vincent Zavatt volunteered his services as Deputy Sheriff in Inwood, New York and helped eradicate the notorious Black Hand in Inwood, His efforts in the community and the Democratic Party led to the town of Inwood naming a street after him "Zavatt Street." Zavatt received a Bachelor of Arts degree in 1922 from Columbia University and a Bachelor of Laws in 1924 from Columbia Law School. He served as a private in the United States Army during World War I from 1918 to 1919, and as a Lieutenant Commander in the United States Naval Reserve during World War II serving three years of active duty. He entered private practice in Nassau County from 1927 to 1957. He was an Instructor at the School of Business Administration at New York University from 1930 to 1933. He was counsel to the New York State Legislature from 1948 to 1953.

=== Other activities ===
Zavatt was active in the Nassau County Bar Association, serving as its President in 1950. He was also instrumental in creating the Legal Aid Society in Nassau County.

== Federal judicial service ==
Zavatt was nominated by President Dwight D. Eisenhower on June 21, 1957, to a seat on the United States District Court for the Eastern District of New York vacated by Judge Clarence G. Galston. He was confirmed by the United States Senate on August 5, 1957, and received his commission on August 7, 1957. He served as Chief Judge from 1962 to 1969. He assumed senior status on December 31, 1970. His service terminated on August 31, 1985, due to his death.

=== Notable case ===
In one of Zavatt's major decisions, he ordered the authorities in Manhasset, L.I., to end de facto segregation in elementary schools. In a New York Times Article, the National Association for the Advancement of Colored People, hailed the ruling as a landmark decision. The case centered around black pupils who more than a year behind the national average. Zavatt held eight weeks of hearings, and without a jury reached a decision. Zavatt stated upon granting the Injunction, "The denial of the right not to be segregated cannot be assuaged or supported by evidence indicating that underachievement in the three R's may be due in whole or in part to low socioeconomic level, home influence or measured intelligence quotient. The role of public education in our democracy is not limited to these academic subjects. It encompasses a broader preparation for participation in the mainstream of our society."

Robert L. Carter, NAACP's General Counsel call it "the best analyzed decision on this problem that has been handed down." Carter stated that the 59-page opinion would "carry more weight" than other recent decisions that have blocked efforts toward fuller integration in some communities. He predicted the ruling would "light a fire" under some school boards in the State.

== Publication ==
- In 1966, Zavatt published the book "Sentencing Procedure in the United States District Court for the Eastern District of New York." (ASIN: B0007JWTTY)

== Sources ==
Legal offices
Preceded by Clarence G. Galston	Judge of the United States District Court for the Eastern District of New York; 1957–1970	Succeeded by Edward Raymond Neaher
Preceded by Walter Bruchhausen	Chief Judge of the United States District Court for the Eastern District of New York; 1962–1969	Succeeded by Jacob Mishler
