= CitySpire =

Skyscraper in Manhattan, New York

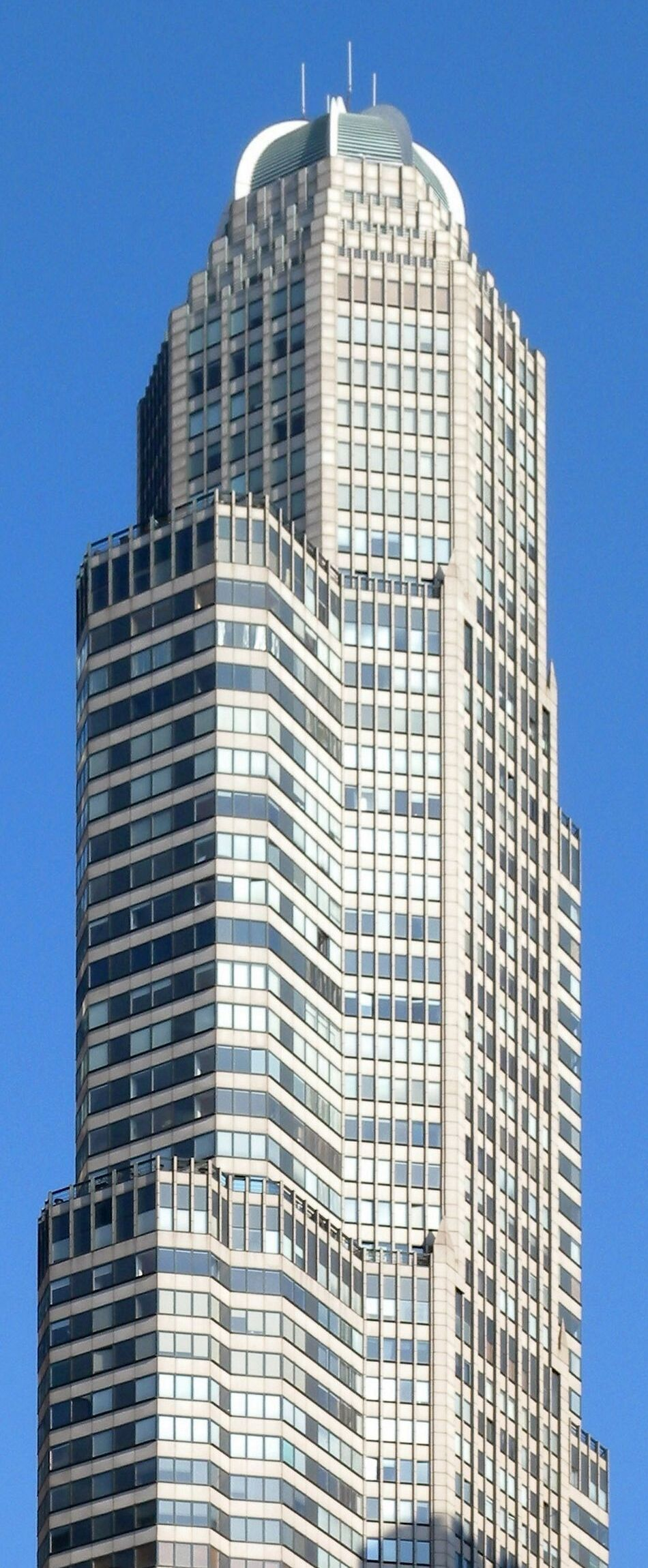
- Seen in June 2010
- Alternative names: CitySpire Center

General information
- Location: 150–156 West 56th Street
- Coordinates: 40°45′51″N 73°58′47″W
- Construction started: 1985
- Topped-out: June 1987
- Completed: 1990
- Owner: Delshah Capital and AM Property (offices); Various (residential condos)

Height
- Antenna spire: 814 ft (248 m)
- Top floor: 75

Technical details
- Floor count: 73
- Floor area: 830,000 ft^{2} (77,110 m^{2})
- Lifts/elevators: 10

Design and construction
- Architect: Murphy/Jahn
- Developer: Ian Bruce Eichner
- Structural engineer: Robert Rosenwasser Associates

CitySpire (also known as CitySpire Center) is a mixed-use skyscraper at 150 West 56th Street in the Midtown Manhattan neighborhood of New York City. Completed in 1990 and designed by Murphy/Jahn Architects, the building measures 814 feet (248 m) tall with 75 stories. CitySpire was developed by Ian Bruce Eichner on a site adjacent to the New York City Center theater. When completed, CitySpire was the second-tallest concrete tower in the United States after the Sears Tower.

The skyscraper has an octagonal plan with a dome inspired by that of the New York City Center. The facade is made of stone with glass windows, and it contains setbacks at the 46th and 62nd floors. The building has entrances at 56th and 55th Streets, connected by a passageway that forms part of 6½ Avenue. The lowest 22 floors of the tower are for commercial use. Above are luxury apartments, which are larger on higher floors.

Eichner proposed CitySpire in 1984, acquiring unused air rights above City Center and making improvements to the theater to almost double the tower's area. After several agencies approved the project, City Center began construction in 1985 and was topped out by June 1987. A controversy ensued when the building exceeded its approved height by 11 or 14 feet (3.4 or 4.3 m); Eichner agreed to add dance-studio space to compensate for the height overrun, but he ultimately never built the space. Soon after CitySpire's opening in 1989, the building went into foreclosure, and there were complaints of a whistling noise from the roof for two years.

== Site ==
CitySpire is at 150 West 56th Street, between Sixth Avenue and Seventh Avenue three blocks south of Central Park, in the Midtown Manhattan neighborhood of New York City. The building's land lot covers 24,237 square feet (2,251.7 m^{2}) and has a frontage of 225.5 feet (68.7 m) along 56th Street. While the site is 200 feet (61 m) deep, extending south to 55th Street, only a small section of the lot has frontage on 55th Street.

The building is directly west of the New York City Center and 125 West 55th Street; the former is a New York City designated landmark at 135 West 55th Street. Immediately to the north are Carnegie Hall, Carnegie Hall Tower, Russian Tea Room, and Metropolitan Tower from west to east. Other nearby buildings include 140 West 57th Street, 130 West 57th Street, and the Parker New York hotel to the northeast, as well as the 55th Street Playhouse to the southwest and 1345 Avenue of the Americas to the southeast.

The neighborhood was part of a former artistic hub around a two-block section of West 57th Street between Sixth Avenue and Broadway. The hub had been developed during the late 19th and early 20th centuries, following the opening of Carnegie Hall. Several buildings in the area were constructed as residences for artists and musicians, such as 130 and 140 West 57th Street, the Rodin Studios, and the Osborne Apartments, as well as the demolished Sherwood Studios and Rembrandt. In addition, the area contained the headquarters of organizations such as the American Fine Arts Society, the Lotos Club, and the American Society of Civil Engineers. By the 21st century, the artistic hub had largely been replaced with Billionaires' Row, a series of luxury skyscrapers around the southern end of Central Park. Just prior to CitySpire's construction, the site was occupied by six vacant lots at 132–158 West 56th Street and one on 137 West 55th Street. These lots were acquired in the 1970s by Richard M. Chapman, who razed the buildings there.

== Architecture ==
CitySpire (also known as CitySpire Center) was designed by Murphy/Jahn and developed by Ian Bruce Eichner. It was constructed by Tishman Realty & Construction, with Robert Rosenwasser Associates as structural engineer. CitySpire is 814 feet (248 m) tall with 75 above-ground levels and two basement stories; the concrete frame reaches a height of 800 feet (240 m). When completed, CitySpire was the second-tallest concrete tower in the United States after the Sears Tower in Chicago.

=== Form and facade ===
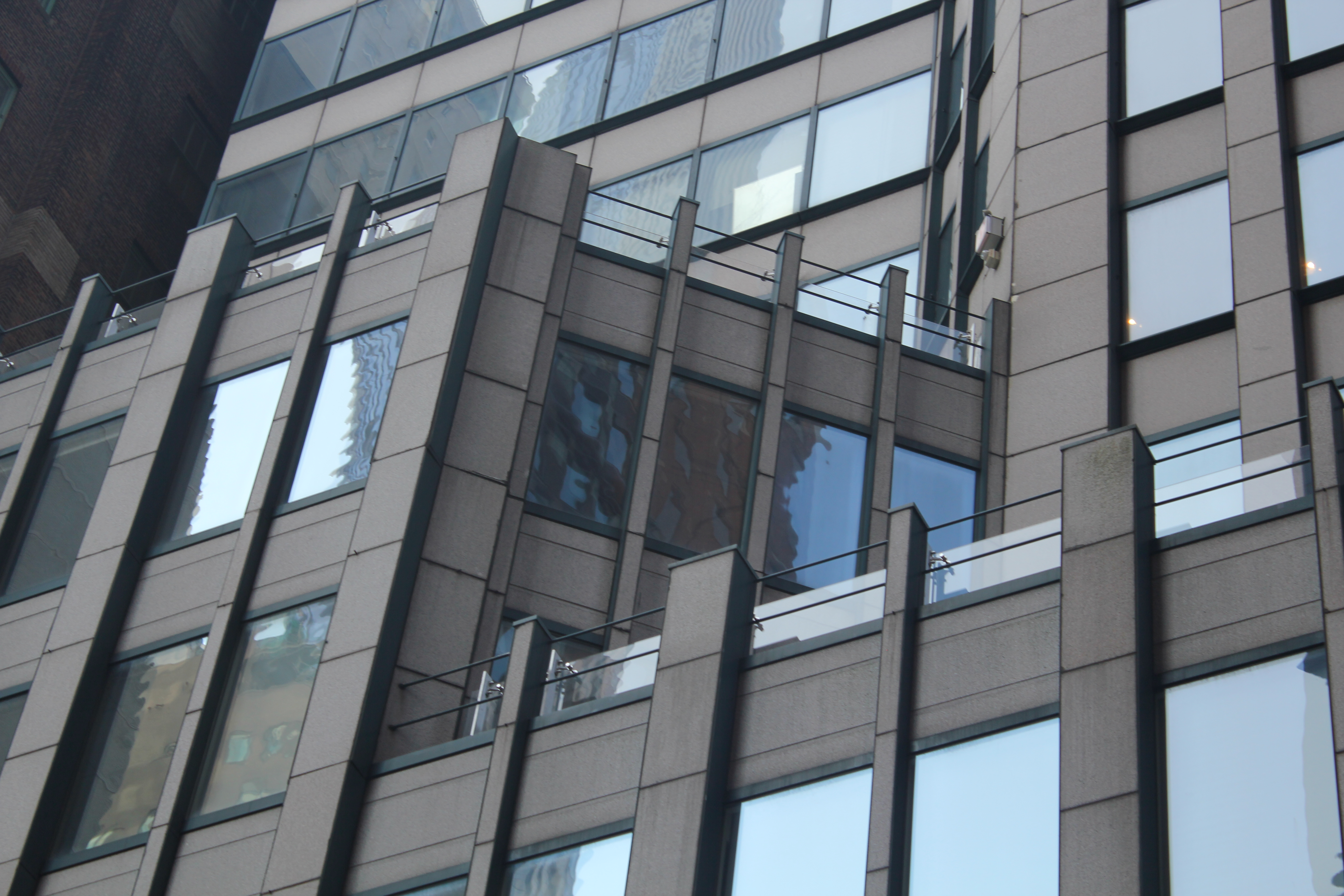
Lower facade detail

CitySpire was designed from the beginning as an octagonal tower with wings on the east and west. CitySpire has three setbacks on the east and west they are placed at the 23rd, 46th, and 62nd floors. Most of the building is no more than 80 feet (24 m) wide. Because the building is so narrow, the upper stories sometimes sway during heavy storms.

As proposed, the main shaft of the tower was to be clad in stone, while the wings were to be made of glass. The facade is made of Sardinian "luna pearl" that is cut into 13/16-inch (21 mm) slabs, measuring about 15 pounds per square foot (73 kg/m^{2}). Each slab is attached to the aluminum curtain wall frame on all sides, supported only by the curtain wall. The stone panels are entirely prefabricated and are insulated with fiberglass panels measuring 2 5/8 inches (67 mm) thick, along with neoprene gaskets and silicone caulk. The setbacks at the 46th and 62nd floors were designed with parapets of steel and concrete, which were reduced in size as part of a 1988 lawsuit settlement concerning the building's height. Eichner disliked the parapets; he suggested that residents on the 46th floor "can look out at it and know they're looking at a wall instead of Central Park so that Helmut Jahn can rest easy knowing that his 'artistic integrity' is intact."

The roof has a copper-faced dome which, as originally proposed, was supposed to be 13 feet (4.0 m) tall. When it was ultimately installed in 1988, the dome contained eight steel ribs, each measuring 20 feet (6.1 m) long and weighing 700 pounds (320 kg). Each rib consisted of three sections. The dome itself contains louvers and was designed with a green surface. When the dome was constructed, wind created a loud whistling sound when passing through the louvers; this was remedied in 1992 with the removal of alternating panels. Paul Sachner of Architectural Record initially likened the dome to that of the Nebraska State Capitol, while Paul Goldberger of The New York Times said the dome was meant to relate to City Center.

=== Structural features ===
The superstructure is made of concrete. Because of CitySpire's mixed-use spaces, it contains nine different structural systems, since a unified grid of columns was infeasible for apartment layouts. Further, because Eichner wanted to maximize views of the surrounding city, the wind-resisting sections of the superstructure had to be placed in the interior.

The lower stories, used as offices, were largely designed as a grid of concrete columns, allowing for flexible office layouts. While the lower stories are largely composed of grids of columns, there are also sections of rectangular concrete panels, which are staggered across several levels to create a diagonal wind brace. The upper stories are designed as a "shear wall/open tube" structural system, in which shear walls extend from the elevator core at the center of the tower, connecting to the outer columns.

=== Interior ===
CitySpire has a floor area of around 830,000 square feet (77,100 m^{2}), and ten elevators rise the height of the building. Before CitySpire was developed, the site was zoned to only allow a building of around 34 stories without any modifications. Given the size of the lot, this would have provided up to 363,000 square feet (33,700 m^{2}) of space. Eichner obtained unused air rights above City Center, which only occupied a small amount of the maximum space allowed for its lot; this allowed a 60-story tower. On top of this, Eichner was allowed to increase the building's floor area ratio by 20 percent in exchange for renovating City Center. This amounted to 128,000 square feet (11,900 m^{2}) of extra space. These bonuses allowed CitySpire to be more than twice as large as it ordinarily would have been.

The interior floor-numbering system skips floors 13 and 25, so there are physically only 73 stories, though the top story is numbered 75. The lowest 22 or 23 floors of the building are for commercial use. There are luxury apartments on the remaining floors, (Note: This is also cited as 50 floors.) as well as a mechanical story. The building was designed with elaborate details. The attention to detail extended to the elevator buttons, which Jahn redesigned with three buttons to a row when Eichner found two buttons per row to be unpleasing.

==== Base ====
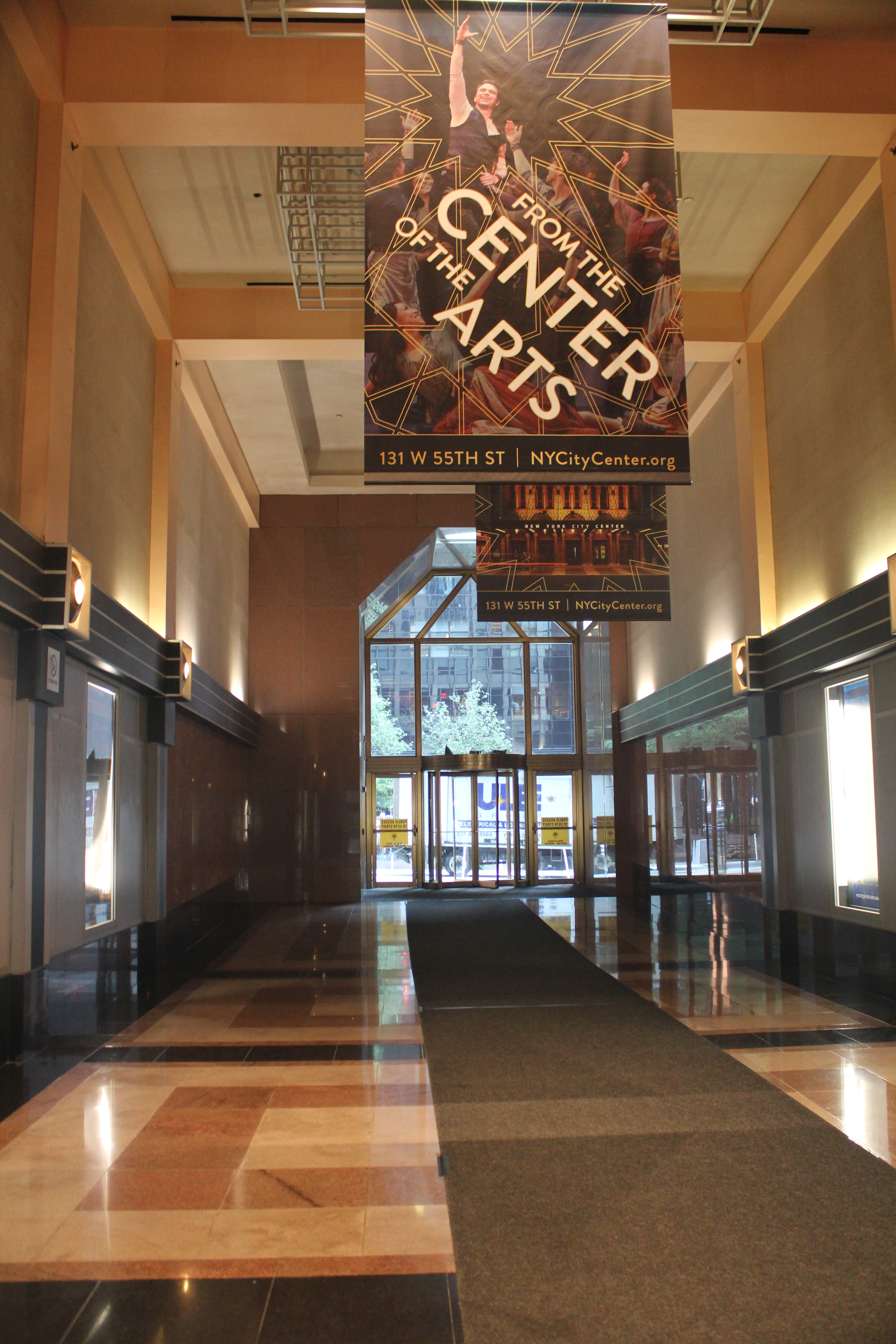
Pedestrian corridor in the base

A pedestrian arcade between 56th and 55th Streets is included in CitySpire's base as part of its construction. The arcade is one of nine passageways that form 6½ Avenue, a set of full-block passageways from 51st to 57th Street between Sixth and Seventh Avenues. It was built as a "through-block connection" under the Special Midtown District, created in 1982. The connection itself was not opened until 1997, several years after the building opened; the delay was largely due to the building's foreclosure and other disputes in the early 1990s. The arcade, designed by Brennan Beer Gorman, consists of marble and granite walls as well as a 25-foot (7.6 m) ceiling. The passageway is decorated in an Art Deco-inspired style, with theater posters on the walls. The space has recessed lights on the ceiling and lights on the walls, but there is no seating since the passageway was designed merely for pedestrian movement.

The office and residential lobbies are separate from each other. The residential lobby at 150 West 56th Street has a domed ceiling as well as wooden paneling. The office portion of CitySpire has the address 156 West 56th Street. There is also a bar called Carnegie Club (originally Carnegie Bar and Books). The bar, on the ground floor, has a ceiling 25 feet (7.6 m) high with an overhanging mezzanine. A garage and cafe was also included in the base. The building was planned with 305,000 square feet (28,300 m^{2}) of office space. Each of the office stories typically measures 193 by 80 feet (59 by 24 m), with polygonal cutouts at each corner.

==== Tower ====
The building was proposed with 355 luxury residential condominiums, but it was completed with 339 or 340 condos. According to the New York City Department of City Planning, there are 340 condominiums in the entire building, of which 337 are residential units. About 100 of the apartments were built with one bedroom, with the rest having multiple bedrooms. Many of the residential units are separated from each other by the building's shear walls. Due to the setbacks on the exterior, floors 47 through 61 typically measure 157 by 80 feet (48 by 24 m), while floors 63 through 69 are an octagon measuring 80 feet across.

The apartments at CitySpire vary in size and arrangement, though many of the units contain 20-foot-wide (6.1 m) terraces. For instance, one studio apartment has a living room, kitchen, and terrace. Some of the one-bedroom units also have living and dining rooms with angled walls. In some of the two-bedroom units, there is a foyer with a living/dining room, kitchens, and bedrooms leading off it. There are also duplex units with kitchens, living rooms, and dining rooms on the lower tier, as well as bedrooms on the upper tiers. One of the larger duplexes, on floors 65/66, has four bedrooms; a living/dining area with a library and breakfast area; a family room; and a terrace measuring 44 by 36 feet (13 by 11 m). On upper floors, the units tend to be larger, reaching 2,200 square feet (200 m^{2}) below the penthouse.

Eichner originally intended to occupy a penthouse apartment atop CitySpire, but he ended up never living in the unit. The penthouse was instead purchased in 1993 by real estate developer Steven Klar for about $4.5 million as a "raw space"; it covers floors 72 through 75, though floor 72 is a guest suite. Klar had hired Juan Pablo Molyneux to redesign the penthouse over two and a half years. The penthouse, covering 8,000 square feet (740 m^{2}), has six bedrooms and nine bathrooms, as well as three terraces. The master bedroom takes up an entire story, while the master bathroom has green marble cladding as well as bronze and mahogany fixtures. The penthouse also has a classical-columned foyer, a large dining room with a chandelier, a wine closet with space for 1,000 bottles, and a private elevator. Molyneux personally disliked the design, calling it a "horror", though this was apparently because Molyneux actually never saw the design in person, having been dismissed before the design was completed.

When CitySpire was built, it was advertised with amenities such as the SpireCard, a charge account to which each resident could request a luxury service for a fee. It was also advertised with a media room containing a large-screen TV; a lounge with bar; and a business center with stock quote and telex machines. The modern amenities include a party and conference rooms, play area, and fitness center with pool.

== History ==
The neighboring New York City Center had opened in 1924 as the Mecca Temple, a house of worship for the Shriners. The Mecca Temple was acquired by the New York City government in 1943 and became a theater. In 1982, City Center completed a minor renovation to the lobby and orchestra. City Center planned another set of improvements to enlarge stage, storage, and balcony areas. The New York City Landmarks Preservation Commission (LPC) designated City Center as a city landmark in 1983; as a result, the commission was required to approve any major alterations to the theater. Concurrently, Bruce Eichner bought Chapman's neighboring site for $18 million. He also bought a parking garage, whose owner agreed to sell it on the condition a replacement parking garage was built.

=== Development ===
==== Planning ====
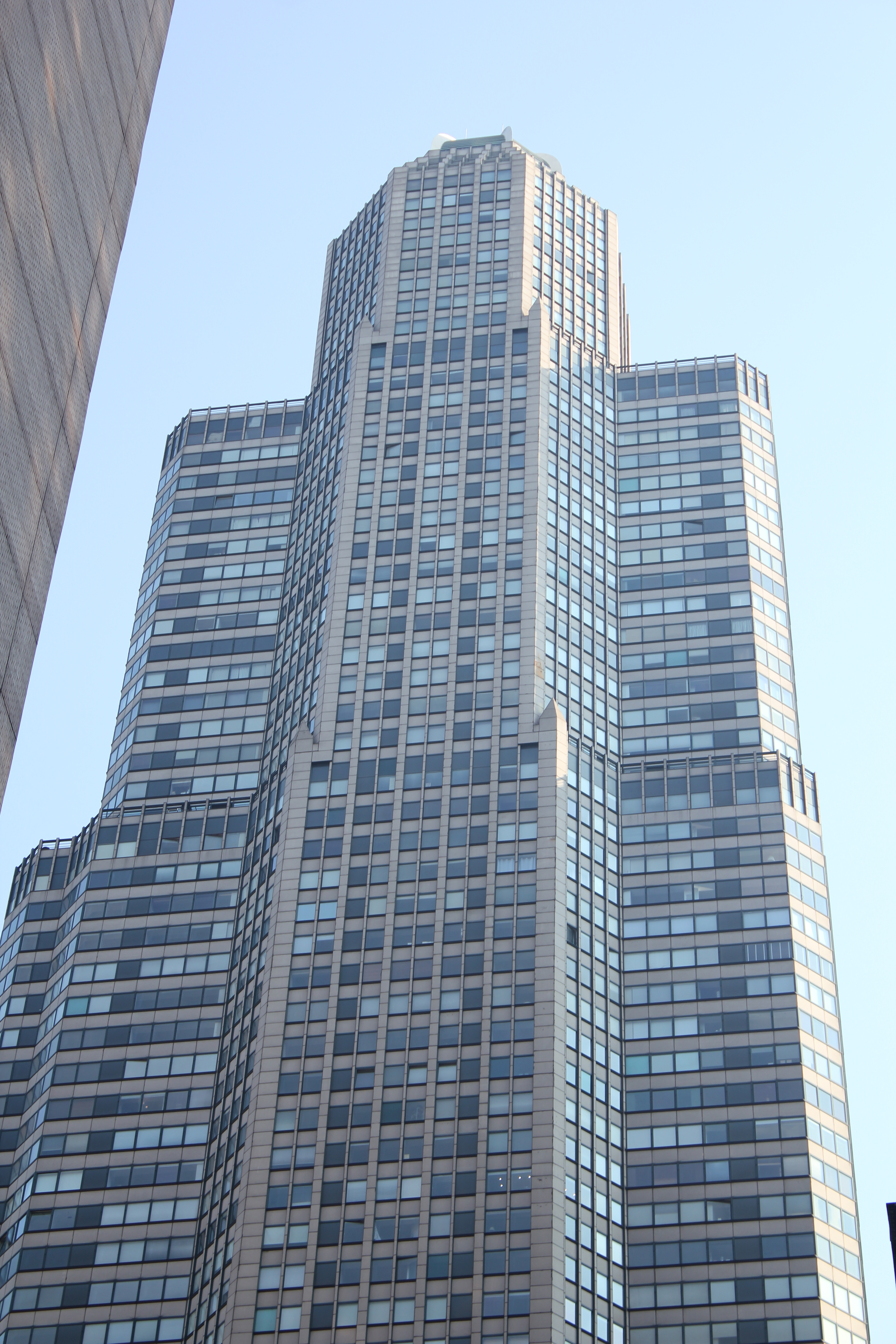
Seen from 54th Street

In May 1984, Eichner announced that he would build a 72-story skyscraper on the site, designed by Murphy/Jahn. The building would contain 22 stories of offices and 49 stories of condominiums. It would be shaped like an octagon with setbacks and a domed roof. A key part of Eichner's development was his proposal to purchase unused air rights above City Center. Eichner would also make improvements to City Center to obtain additional space. The sale was expected to raise $10 to 14 million for the New York City Opera, New York City Ballet, and City Center's sublessee 55th Street Dance Theater. The proposed air-rights sale received criticism both for its relatively low price and for the fact that it would allow an excessively large building. City Center Tower was one of several high-rise developments planned for the area at the time; Metropolitan Tower and Carnegie Hall Tower were being proposed as well.

The air-rights transfers needed the approval of several agencies. In August 1984, the New York City Board of Estimate voted to allow the sale of air rights. The LPC was scheduled to hold a hearing for the proposed sale in November 1984, but an unrelated controversy over another landmark candidate took up all the time allotted for discussing the air-rights sale. The LPC granted the project a "certificate of appropriateness" in January 1985, which allowed the LPC to apply for a special zoning permit from the New York City Planning Commission (CPC) for the air-rights transfer. Several agencies then needed to approve the tower itself. Following objections from members of the Board of Estimate and CPC, some elements of City Center Tower were downsized. The CPC approved the tower in June 1985, followed by the Board of Estimate that August.

The building had been approved to a height of about 800 feet (240 m). (Note: The height is cited variously as 798 feet (243 m), 799 feet (244 m), or 802.6 feet (244.6 m).) Though the City Center Tower was to be New York City's tallest residential tower upon its construction, Eichner cited a study that "proved" the top of the tower would not cast shadows on the street. He described the tower as a "quintessential New York skyscraper", compared to the "undistinguished" glass-clad office buildings on Madison and Park Avenues. Eichner received $157.5 million in construction financing. Both Eichner and his lawyer Howard Horenstein donated several thousand dollars to Mayor Ed Koch, who had voted in favor of the tower. The donations were investigated in an ethics probe in 1987.

==== Construction ====
By the time the Board of Estimate had approved City Center Tower, pouring of the concrete slabs was underway. The project was being referred to as CitySpire by mid-1986, when European American Bank leased eight of the office stories. The construction of CitySpire involved controversies over safety. Susan Guszynski of the Joffrey Ballet, a tenant in City Center, wrote a letter to the New York City Department of Buildings (DOB) in late 1986, alleging that three Joffrey staff had been hit by falling concrete during one week that October. The Buildings Department subsequently received four additional complaints of falling objects, including one instance in which a portion of the facade fell from the roof. Neighbors also filed lawsuits claiming that CitySpire's construction had led to debris pileups and various incidents. One neighbor claimed that he received death threats after complaining to the police about cracked windows, while another neighbor was allegedly raped after an attacker climbed into her apartment through CitySpire's scaffolding.

Marketing for the residential units started in March 1987, with TV advertisements that featured celebrities such as Dick Cavett, Carol Channing, Lauren Hutton, Robert Joffrey, Lynn Redgrave, and Tommy Tune. Despite this, only 60 of the 340 condos were in contract by that August. The slow sales were attributed to the shortage of small apartments, as well as the tower's location in a traditionally non-residential neighborhood. The advertisements also received complaints for including only white people; the director of the building's marketing team claimed they were just targeting the demographic who was most likely to buy apartments there. Horenstein denied the advertisements were intended to discourage minorities.

==== Completion and height controversy ====
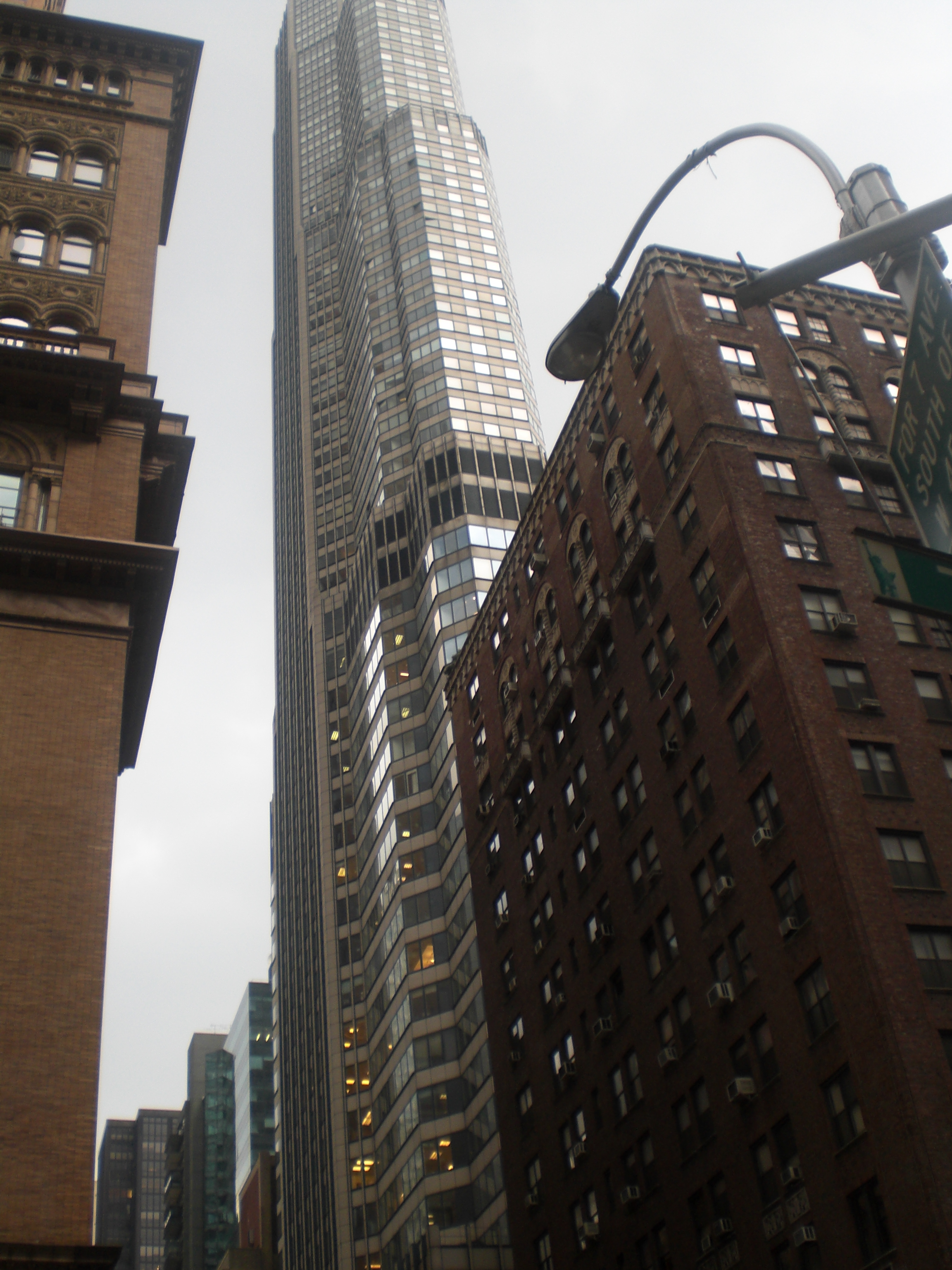
As seen from 56th Street and 7th Avenue

The building had topped out by mid-1987. The building, as constructed, exceeded its approved height by either 11 feet (3.4 m) or 14 feet (4.3 m). The difference of 3 feet (0.91 m) was a calculation error from two different methods of measuring height, but the extra 11 feet came from Eichner's decision to add 2 inches (51 mm) of cement to all the floor slabs to stiffen them. The topped-out structure had to undergo a second public review from the Board of Estimate, Manhattan Community Board 5, and the CPC. Eichner voluntarily agreed to halt CitySpire's structural work, though he saw the height overruns as being "of no consequence to anyone". By November 1987, Eichner and city officials were discussing a compromise in which Eichner would give more arts funding but keep the extra height. By the end of 1987, Eichner had sold 164 of the apartments, and some of the commercial space was already occupied. Residential prices at CitySpire had remained relatively low in the wake of Black Monday two months earlier.

Community Board 5 officials voted against allowing the extra height in protest of the zoning law. The CPC rejected the additional height that December, saying Eichner could have pursued other options, including lowering ceiling heights, to stay within the 800-foot height limit. CPC chairwoman Sylvia Deutsch rejected Eichner's offer to add unrelated amenities and pay the city extra cash, and she also dismissed complaints from neighbors who opposed the project for unrelated reasons. In April 1988, the city and Eichner tentatively reached a settlement in which Eichner agreed to build 7,200 square feet (670 m^{2}) of dance studios above the pedestrian arcade and reduce some facade details. The agreement, contingent on the dome not being completed, had not been ratified by the CPC or Board of Estimate. Deutsch called the agreement "reasonable"; however, community groups thought it would set a precedent for developers who built past their height limits, and some LPC members specifically opposed the design.

Residents of the lower floors were allowed to move into the building by mid-1988, even though the upper stories did not have their occupancy certificate. CitySpire's dome was completed in August 1988, apparently in violation of the settlement. While Community Board 5 had notified the DOB about the illegal work earlier, the dome had been completed by the time the DOB issued a stop-work order. Koch ordered the dome dismantled that November. The ribs were partially removed so CitySpire would only exceed the permitted height by 1.5 feet (0.46 m). City Center filed a lawsuit that month, alleging that Eichner had not renovated the theater as promised. City Center sought an injunction to forbid the DOB from issuing CitySpire a certificate of occupancy for the top twenty stories until the renovations were performed. A New York Supreme Court justice declined to issue the injunction, and the city allowed Eichner to open the 51st through 63rd floors. Community Board 5 "demanded" the city deny CitySpire a special zoning permit for the extra height.

The removal of the dome was temporary pending the approval of a zoning variance through the Uniform Land Use Review Procedure, which was granted in January 1989. Soon after, the CPC voted to permit the completion of CitySpire's dome in exchange for the dance studios in the base. The Board of Estimate continued to debate over whether the dance studios were an appropriate penalty for Eichner. In March 1989, the Board of Estimate voted 6–5 to allow the dance studios as an appropriate penalty. The height agreement received opposition from city comptroller Harrison J. Goldin, who charged that Eichner was violating the law, and from critics who believed the dance studios, at 21 by 60 feet (6.4 by 18.3 m), were too small. The dome was subsequently damaged in a fire in May 1989, which investigators determined was an arson. Eichner had still not completed renovations at City Center like he had promised, and the building's pedestrian arcade was not open to the public.

=== Usage ===
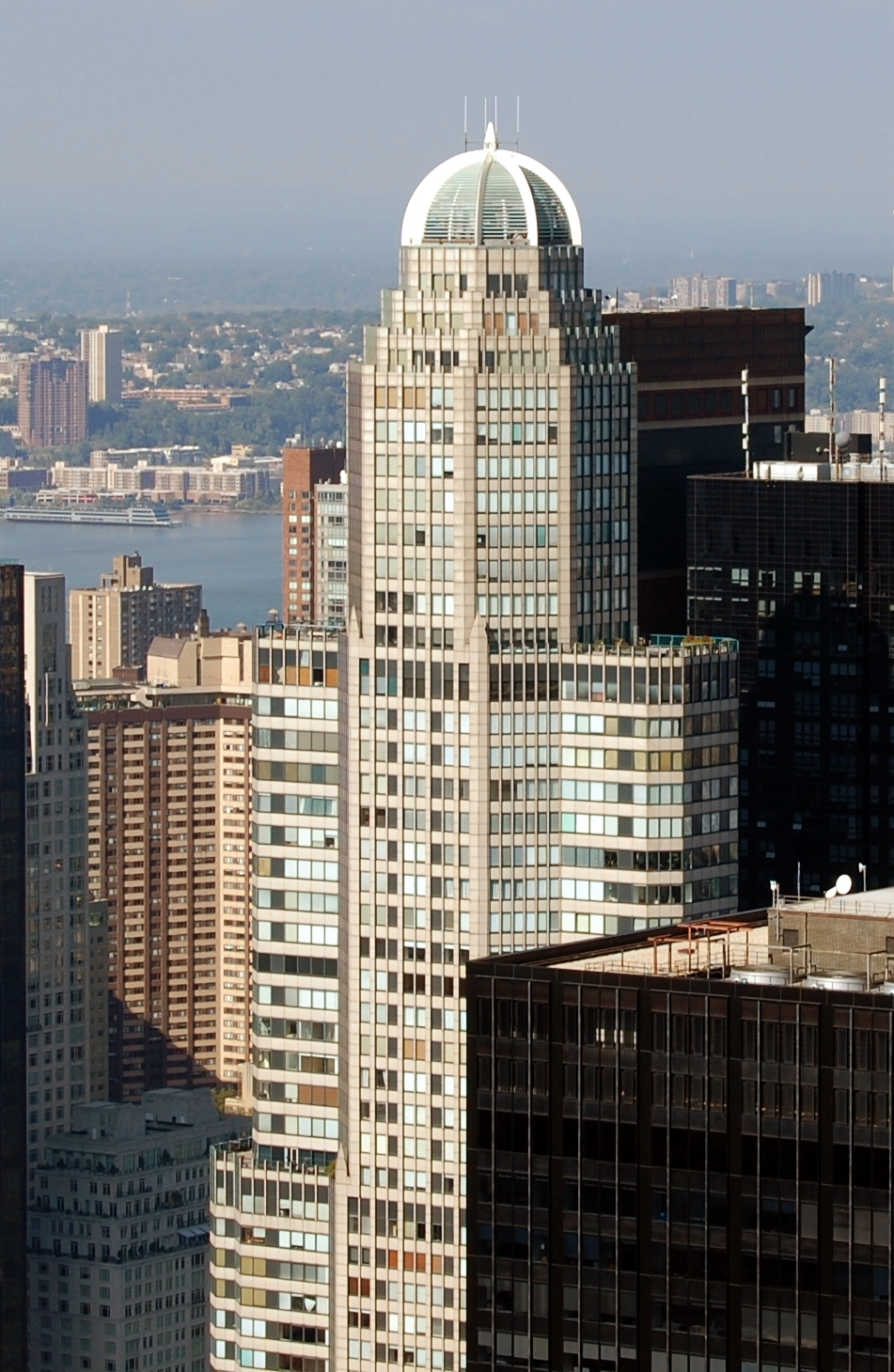
Roof of CitySpire, which caused controversy for making a "whistling" sound in its early years

Eichner had sold 280 of the apartments and three-quarters of the office space by early 1989, and the building was completed by 1990. CitySpire's dance studios were supposed to be completed in September 1989, but it was not until mid-1990 that Eichner applied for a permit. Construction on the studios had not even started because, according to Hornstein, the plans had to be approved by several agencies. Eichner still had yet to sell the 50 remaining apartments and the remaining 20 percent of commercial space. Ten of these apartments were in the top stories that could not be completed until the studios were finished.

==== Noise pollution and bankruptcy ====
Shortly after CitySpire's completion, Eichner was concurrently negotiating construction loans with his lenders, which included Citibank and European American Bank. He was also delinquent on $3.7 million of tax payments, which the city sued that July to recover. In October 1990, European American Bank challenged the collateral behind $50 million worth of construction loans on the building. The next month, the bank foreclosed on the loans. That December, the New York City Department of Environmental Protection (DEP) fined CitySpire for noise violations, making CitySpire the first building to be individually cited by the DEP for noise pollution. The DEP had received hundreds of complaints about a loud whistling noise that was audible several blocks away; the noise was caused by wind blowing through louvers on the dome. Neighbors reported being kept awake by the noise. Monroe Price opined that "the community should attempt to understand what the building is trying to say", while Progressive Architecture said: "In a less restrictive era, we might look forward to developers' plans for 'The Wind Chime Centre' or 'One Kazoo Plaza'."

At a hearing in February 1991, Judge Gerald Denaro of New York City's Environmental Control Board ordered a study on the noise coming from the dome. The building faced a fine of up to $880 if it was found guilty of whistling. (Note: The Real Deal suggests it would have been a daily fine.) West 56th Street Association, the building's legal owner, filed for Chapter 11 bankruptcy protection at the end of that month. The association, a limited partnership where Eichner was the general partner, faced lawsuits from both European American Bank and Bank of Nova Scotia. The association had also faced a receivership proceeding, as it had also failed to pay the condominium apartments' common charges. The bankruptcy proceeding absolved Eichner from paying $11 million in unpaid taxes, but the building's residential sales office had to shut down that year.

In April 1991, Denaro ruled that CitySpire was guilty of violating the noise ordinance and fined the managing agent $220. A federal judge ruled that September that the city's noise code was too vague to be enforced, leading the New York City Council to draft a law to more strictly define noise. By May 1992, the building's board of managers said the whistling would be fixed within several weeks. Bankruptcy proceedings, meanwhile, had been stalled over an unpaid $324,000 capital gains tax. A reorganization plan for the tower was finally approved in September 1992, eighteen months after the building's owner had filed for bankruptcy. The roof noise was stopped that October, and the receivers paid the city $2.1 million instead of renovating City Center's studios as a penalty. The receivers also sought to be exempted from their obligation to build studios above the pedestrian arcade, which was still unfinished.

==== Mid- and late 1990s ====
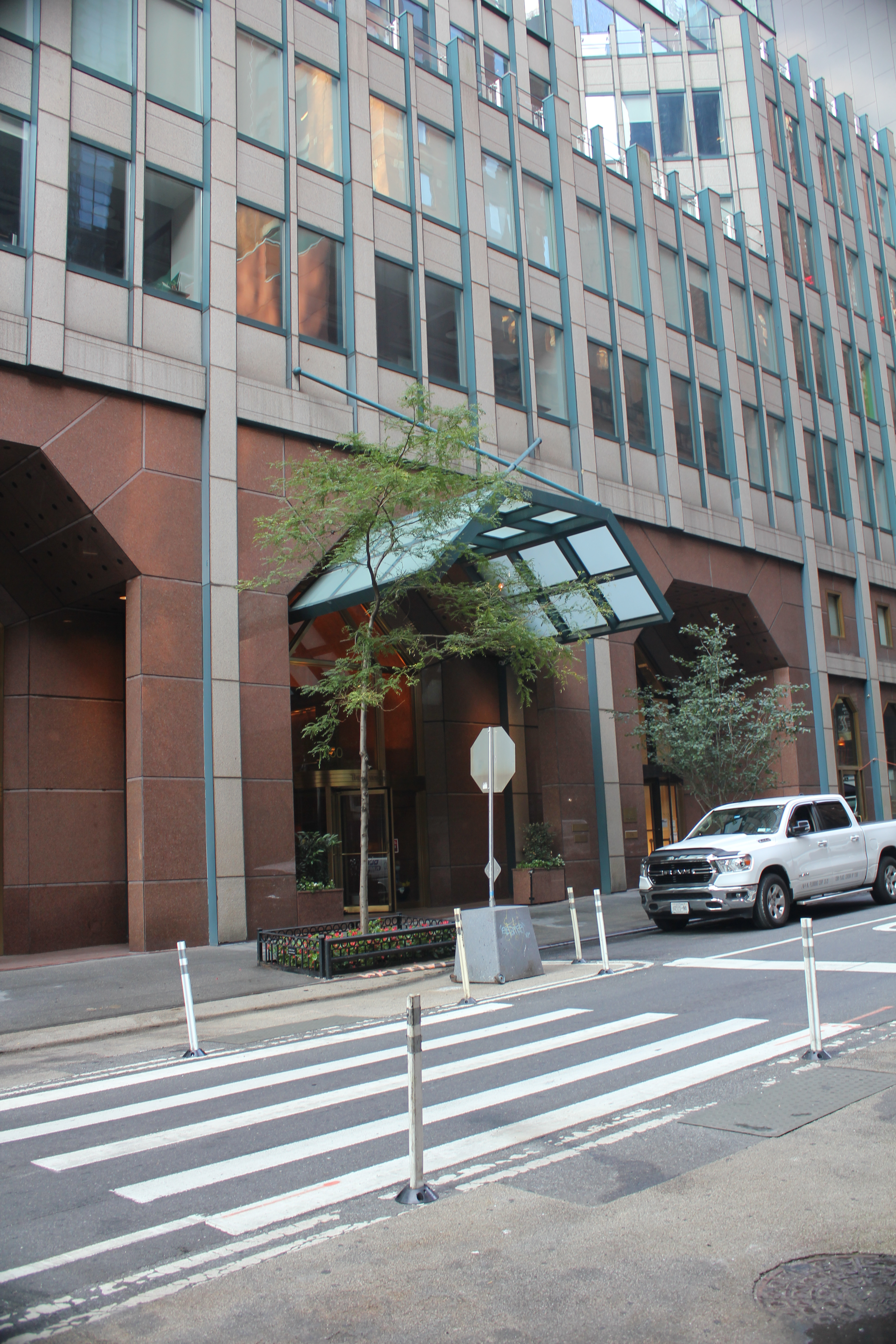
Residential entrance as seen from 56th Street

Euram, a subsidiary of European American Bank's parent ABN AMRO, took over the residential section and renovated 75 vacant units. The Bank of Nova Scotia rebranded the commercial section as Midland Tower. Euram started marketing the vacant apartments in May 1993; ten of the units had been sold within a month, and all the condos were sold by the following year. Eichner continued to maintain offices at CitySpire. Although the financial issues and noise complaints had been resolved, the studios and arcade, which had been a compromise for CitySpire's height, had still not been completed by 1995. The arcade was strewn with litter and blocked off with razor wire and wooden panels, and CitySpire's owners planned to renovate it for use. The owners planned to scrap the studios above the arcade, instead creating additional rehearsal space in City Center itself.

Around 1996, Joseph Neumann and Credit Suisse First Boston acquired CitySpire for $38 million. The building had been offered for $50 million, but Neumann and First Boston were able to buy the building for less after beating a competing bid from Henry Elghanayan. At the time, the building owed $1.9 million in taxes to the city government. The office owners (composed of First Boston and external investors), along with the residential condo owners, bore the cost of the pedestrian arcade's $1 million renovation. CitySpire's pedestrian arcade was finally completed in late 1997. Upon the arcade's completion, David W. Dunlap wrote for The New York Times that it had taken seven years between the authorization of the first transcontinental railroad and the laying of its golden spike, but it had taken twelve years between the arcade's approval and its opening. The arcade's opening completed the set of walkways from 51st to 57th Street. In addition, some of the office space was converted into "prebuilt" offices.

==== 2000s to present ====
The office stories were owned by Singapore government investment fund GIC by 2001. GIC leased space to Windels Marx, GE Capital, and The Recording Academy. That year, Lehman Brothers and Morgan Stanley provided a $900 million mortgage to GIC for CitySpire's office stories and some of GIC's other properties. The office section of CitySpire was acquired in 2004 by Tishman Speyer, who bought a 51 percent majority stake. GIC continued to hold a 49 percent stake.

In 2012, Tishman Speyer and an unidentified pension fund acquired CitySpire and several other buildings as part of a portfolio valued at $1.6 billion. The same year, Douglas Elliman marketed the penthouse apartment for $100 million, which would have made it the most expensive residence in New York City had it been sold at that price. After receiving few offers, the penthouse's owner withdrew the unit from the market and offered it for sale himself, only to withdraw it again in 2015. At that point, the majority of CitySpire's residences, over sixty percent, were being used as pieds-a-terre rather than as primary residences.

As of 2021, CitySpire's commercial occupants include New York Road Runners, Windels Marx, and Brown Shoe Company. Tishman Speyer and GIC began looking to sell the 24-story office condominium in late 2025. Early the next year, the office portion of the tower was sold to Delshah Capital and AM Property for $135.7 million; this was funded in part by an $88 million loan.

== Critical reception ==
When CitySpire was being planned, Paul Goldberger praised Jahn for including design elements inspired by both City Center and earlier New York City skyscrapers. However, he said the design was "only partially successful in terms of its relationship to the City Center building itself", especially as both buildings' domes were rarely visible simultaneously. Harry Berkowitz of Newsday described the project as one of several designed by architects who "want little to do with the idea of adjusting to a neighborhood". Paul M. Sachner wrote for Architectural Record that the plans "exemplify the 'high-tech historicist' quality" of Murphy/Jahn's work, but he said "many question the appropriateness of a 70-story building" on such a narrow site.

By the time CitySpire was completed, Goldberger believed it looked weaker than the neighboring Carnegie Hall and Metropolitan towers, even though CitySpire had looked better in conceptual depictions. CitySpire, Carnegie Hall Tower, and Metropolitan Tower became known as the "Tuning Fork Trio" because of their shape and proximity to each other. John McPhee of The New Yorker wrote in 2003 that the buildings "look like three chopsticks incongruously holding a cocktail blini", as they surrounded the small Russian Tea Room.

CitySpire's construction also prompted discussion on the appropriateness of transferring air rights from city landmarks, such as City Center, to raise money for landmarks' upkeep. New York Landmarks Conservancy executive director Laurie Beckelman said that "we save [city landmarks] by putting them out of context" in allowing the transfers, and Community Board 5 district manager Joan E. Ramer said that "selling off a precious city resource without understanding the ramifications is simply irresponsible". Former city planning commissioner Martin Gallent said the zoning exceptions allowed midtown Manhattan to be more "overly dense" than it already was. After the height compromise in 1988, Goldberger said, "What is to prevent another developer from adding 22 feet to his building and offering to build two dance studios?" Goldberger also referred to CitySpire as a "case of the city selling its birthright for a mess of pottage".

== See also ==
- List of tallest buildings in New York City
- List of tallest buildings in the United States
