= Denis Reagan Hurley =

American judge (born 1937)

Senior Judge of the United States District Court for the Eastern District of New York
- Incumbent
- Assumed office December 18, 2004

Judge of the United States District Court for the Eastern District of New York
- In office November 5, 1991 – December 18, 2004
- Appointed by: George H. W. Bush
- Preceded by: Seat established by 104 Stat. 5089
- Succeeded by: Joseph F. Bianco

Personal details
- Born: Denis Reagan Hurley; 1937 (age 88–89) Baldwin, New York
- Education: University of Pennsylvania (BS); Columbia University (MBA); Fordham University (JD)

Denis Reagan Hurley (born 1937) is a senior United States district judge of the United States District Court for the Eastern District of New York.

== Education and career ==
Born in Baldwin, New York, Hurley received a Bachelor of Science degree in economics from the Wharton School of the University of Pennsylvania in 1959. Thereafter, he briefly attended Harvard Law School, dropping out because he found the subject uninteresting. He then received a Master of Business Administration from Columbia University in 1962, and while working at the First National City Bank of New York was ordered to pursue a Juris Doctor, which he received from the Fordham University School of Law in 1966.

He was a court bailiff for Judge John Matthew Cannella of the United States District Court for the Southern District of New York from 1963 to 1966. After maintaining a private practice in Syracuse, New York from 1966 to 1968, he was the principal assistant district attorney of Suffolk County, New York from 1968 to 1970. Between 1970 and 1983, he again maintained a private practice in Riverhead, New York. He was a special prosecutor for Suffolk County from 1974 to 1975 and served in the Suffolk County Legislature from 1978 to 1979. He was a senior assistant county attorney of Suffolk County from 1980 to 1981. He was a judge of the New York State Family Court from 1983 to 1987, and of the New York State County Court for Suffolk County from 1988 to 1991, also serving as an acting justice of the New York State Supreme Court from 1987 to 1988. While serving in the family court, he oversaw a case regarding an adopted child with Down's Syndrome that prompted changes to state law.

=== Federal judicial service ===
On June 27, 1991, Hurley was nominated by President George H. W. Bush to a new seat on the United States District Court for the Eastern District of New York created by 104 Stat. 5089. He was confirmed by the United States Senate on October 31, 1991, and received commission on November 5, 1991. He assumed senior status on December 18, 2004.

== Sources ==
Legal offices
Preceded by Seat established by 104 Stat. 5089	Judge of the United States District Court for the Eastern District of New York; 1991–2004	Succeeded by Joseph F. Bianco
