= Safiya Songhai =

American film director

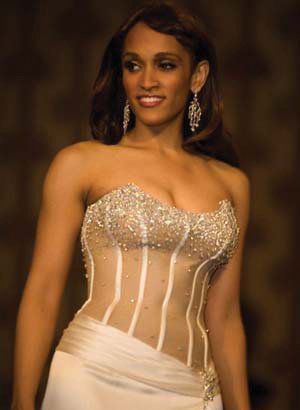
- Born: Philadelphia, Pennsylvania
- Occupations: Film Director, Television Host, Television Producer, Beauty Queen
- Years active: 1999 - present
- Website: www.SafiyaSonghai.com

Safiya Songhai, is an American Film Director, University Professor, Television Anchor/Reporter and beauty queen.

== Biography ==
=== Family ===
Songhai was born in Philadelphia to Dwight Lamont Hendricks and Tamara Pierce. Songhai's parents met at the Philadelphia International Film Festival and Market, a festival where Songhai would later win her first film award. Her mother came from a prominent Philadelphia family and was the co-creator and host for WPVI's show Visions, and later worked at various stations as a camera woman and a news editor for Frontline.

Songhai is the granddaughter of renowned dermatologist Dr. Harold E. Pierce, great-niece of retired federal judge Lawrence W. Pierce, niece of internationally acclaimed artist Barkley L. Hendricks, and cousin of actress model and sportscaster Jayne Kennedy.

Songhai is an African-American descendant of the 300 year old Pierce, Murray, Cuff, Gould settlement located in Gouldtown, New Jersey and Bridgeton, New Jersey.

She is a descendant of the Bamileke of Cameroon and derives from Haitian, and Bajan immigrants. Songhai is also a descendant of the Lenape and Iroquois native people of the Delaware Valley.

=== Education ===
After the age of 7, Songhai was raised in Roxbury, Massachusetts, and graduated from Boston Latin School. Songhai excelled at Public Declamation, Student Government, and writing, and graduated in the top 10% of her class. She was also the President of the African Cultural Society, and a member of the National Honors Society. Songhai was voted most likely to become Head Master due to her immense involvement in her high school. Songhai also founded two awards, the Latin Spirit Scholarship and the Crystal Apple Teacher's Award while she was President of the Student Council.

Songhai was the 1st runner-up to Miss Black USA 2008, representing Massachusetts. Songhai was also a local winner and runner-up in both the District of Columbia and New York state pageants for the Miss America competition. From 2010 - 2012.

=== Higher education ===
Songhai began her studies at Dartmouth College, concentrating in film, history and creative writing. Later, she transferred to Howard University where she graduated summa cum laude and became a third-generation legacy of the school. Songhai later completed her MFA in Film and Television production from New York University's, Tisch School of the Arts Kanbar Institute of Film and Television.

While an undergraduate, Songhai landed the position of television host at the PBS affiliate WHUT-TV in Washington, D.C., and worked at WJZ-TV in Baltimore as a producer and announcer for the Maryland Lottery. She won a student Emmy in her final year in college.

== Film career ==
Safiya Songhai
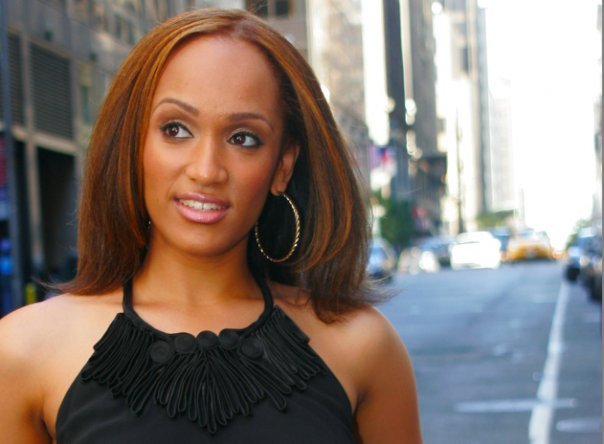
- Safiya Songhai, 2006

In 2003, Songhai began her fledgling film production company Mpirefilms. The first projects were short films, public service announcements and even audition tapes for reality show hopefuls. Her first film, LadyLike, received distribution through AltCinema and has been screened internationally.

In 2010, Songhai joined the faculty of Prairie View A&M University as a full-time professor of mass communications. She was nominated by students and faculty for the President's Teacher's Award, and the PV Choice Awards for excellence in teaching.

She is currently an Assistant Professor of Video Production and Immersive Media at University of Nevada, Reno.

== Filmography ==
Year	Film	Credited as				
Year	Film	Dir.	Wri.	Prd.	Act.	Role
2006	LadyLike					Mother
2007	In Silent Spaces					
2008	The Trial of Charumathi					The Fallen One

=== Awards and nominations ===
LadyLike
Year	Festival	Result	Award	Category
2008	All-American Film Festival	Competition in March	Finalist	Short Films
2007	Garden State Film Festival	Won	Best Student Short	Student Shorts
2007	Duluth Short Shorts Competition	Won	Grand Prize	Short Films
2007	Reel Sisters Film Festival	Won	Curator's Award	Short Films
2006	Philadelphia International Film Festival and Market	Won	Best Student Short	Student Shorts

In Silent Spaces
Year	Festival	Result	Award	Category
2008	Appalachian Film Festival	Official Selection	Festival April 17	Short Films
2008	Fusion Film Festival	Won	Best Cinematography Clarissa Delos Reyes	Graduate Short Films
2008	All-American Film Festival	Competition in March	Finalist	Short Films
2008	New York University Black History Show	Showcase	Screening on Feb 28th	Student Shorts
2008	Harvard University Black Arts Festival	Competition in March	Finalist	Short Films
2007	Bushwick International Film Festival	Nominated	Finalist	Short Films
2007	Philadelphia International Film Festival and Market	Won	Best Short	Shorts

== Journalism and television producing ==
Songhai was an Anchor for Arise News Now at the international news network, Arise.tv. In 2012, Songhai was a weekend anchor and general assignment reporter for the ABC affiliate KQ2 in St. Joseph, Missouri. In 2008, she covered the Crime and Justice beat for the Richard French Live show on WRNN-TV in Westchester, NY. Songhai has also contributed to the online news network FDNN-TV covering human interest stories of East Coast firefighters. While in college and graduate school, Songhai worked as a TV host, and producer for WHUT-TV, the PBS affiliate in Washington, DC. She won a Student Emmy as a co-producer for a special called the Spring Black Arts Festival. Songhai also announced and produced the weekend lottery broadcast at WJZ-TV 13 in Baltimore, MD.

Songhai is featured in two books as an expert interview, Shut Up and Shoot Documentary Guide a Down and Dirty DV Production by Anthony Q. Artis and Reel Food from Reel Women by Nina Knapp. Songhai has been featured in Hype Hair magazine, and was the Jet Beauty of the Week in the December 22–29, 2008 of Jet magazine.

== Pageantry ==
Songhai was first runner-up in the Miss Black USA 2008 pageant, representing Massachusetts in the competition. Songhai has had a notable career in the Miss America Pageant system, winning the title of Miss Five Boroughs in 2004 placed in the top ten winning preliminary on-stage questions in the Miss New York Pageant. Prior to this win, Songhai was first runner up to Miss District of Columbia 2003, second runner up to Miss District of Columbia 2001, and was first runner up to Miss Metropolitan Manhattan 2004. Songhai's talent is usually a comedic monologue, and she has won top-interview, and on-stage question at nearly every pageant in which she has competed.

Preceded by Nwannedima Uchendu	Miss Black Massachusetts USA; 2008	Succeeded by Saundra Quinlan

Preceded by Karmen Kluge	Miss Five Boroughs; 2004	Succeeded by None

== Name meaning ==
Safiya means "clear and pure-minded woman" in the Swahili language. Songhai is from the largest and most accomplished 15th- and 16th-century West African Empire, now Mali, Burkina Faso and Niger, whose leaders emphasized education and social, economic and gender equality.
