= Richie Roberts =

American attorney (born 1937)

- Born: Richard M. Roberts; November 28, 1937 (age 88); The Bronx, New York, U.S.
- Education: Rutgers University; Seton Hall University
- Occupations: Former Detective (1963–1971); Former Assistant Prosecutor (1971–1975); Former Head of Narcotics Task Force, Former Federal Bureau of Narcotics (1973–1975); Former Criminal Defense Attorney (1975–2015)
- Known for: The prosecution of drug kingpin Frank Lucas

Richard M. Roberts (born November 28, 1937) is an American former law enforcement officer and disbarred attorney. Roberts worked as a detective in the Essex County Prosecutor’s Office and the Essex County Bureau of Narcotics. After completing law school at Seton Hall University and passing the bar examination, Roberts served as an Assistant Prosecutor in the Essex County Prosecutor's Office.

Roberts is known for his role in the investigation, arrest, and prosecution of Harlem "drug kingpin" Frank Lucas, who operated a heroin smuggling and distribution ring in the New York City metro area. He was assisted by the hard work and dedication of the three detectives of the Z-TEAM – Eddie Jones, Al Spearman, and Benny Abruzzo. In addition to destroying Lucas's drug operation, the Z-TEAM's investigation uncovered police corruption connected with the drug trade. Lucas's criminal enterprise and the investigation by the Z-TEAM was the subject of the 2007 film American Gangster, starring Denzel Washington (as Lucas) and Russell Crowe (as Roberts). After Lucas was incarcerated, Roberts entered private practice as an attorney specializing in criminal defense and was retained by Lucas as defense counsel.

In April 2017, Roberts pleaded guilty to tax crimes after an investigation against him by the Internal Revenue Service's criminal division and investigators from the U.S. Attorney's Office. He was sentenced to five years of probation, 270 hours of community service, and was ordered to make restitution payments. Contrary to popular belief, Richie Roberts did not arrest Frank Lucas. Frank Lucas was arrested by New York City police officers, whilst Roberts worked in New Jersey at the time.

== Biography ==
=== Life and career ===
Roberts was born in the Bronx, New York City, on November 28, 1937. Roberts was raised by his grandparents in the Bronx until he moved to Newark, New Jersey, with his parents when he was eight years old. He graduated from Newark's Weequahic High School, where he was a star football and baseball player. Roberts is Jewish.

After high school, Roberts served for six years in the United States Marine Corps and attained the rank of Sergeant before being discharged from the service in 1961. He attended Upsala College (now defunct) in East Orange, New Jersey, but failed during his senior year as a result of poor attendance. Roberts later completed his undergraduate work at Rutgers University.

In 1963, Roberts was employed as a Detective by the Essex County Prosecutor's Office in Essex County, New Jersey, where for several years, he was involved in undercover organized crime investigations. Attending night classes, he received a Juris Doctor degree from Seton Hall University School of Law and passed the Bar Examination in New Jersey in August 1971. After being licensed as an attorney, Roberts was made an Assistant Prosecutor in the Essex County Prosecutor's Office. Shortly afterward, he was tapped to head a special Narcotics Task Force that was overseen by the Federal Bureau of Narcotics. Roberts remained with the prosecutor's office until 1975.

After working as a prosecutor for over 10 years, Roberts became a criminal defense attorney in 1981. He was briefly affiliated with the firm Harkavy, Goldman & Capri, but soon established his own firm. The first person he defended was Frank Lucas. During private practice, Roberts has defended many homicide cases and was involved in New Jersey's first Racketeer Influenced and Corrupt Organizations Act (RICO) case. He has also been a guest speaker to conferences held by several police and private groups. He was a co-managing partner of Roberts-Saluti, LLC, a criminal and civil litigation firm with offices in Newark, New Jersey.

=== Investigating Frank Lucas and "Blue Magic" ===
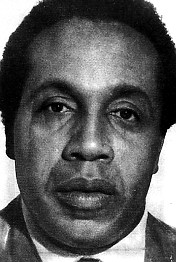
The 1975 mugshot for convicted heroin smuggler and drug kingpin Frank Lucas

As the head of a Federal Bureau of Narcotics task force, Roberts is best known for his role in the investigation, arrest, and prosecution of Frank Lucas (1930-2019), an African-American drug kingpin who operated a heroin smuggling and distribution ring from Harlem in New York City in the late 1960s and early 1970s. The legacy is bolstered by the film American Gangster in 2007; however, crime historian Ron Chepesiuk states that Roberts "was a minor figure in the Lucas investigation; the idea that Roberts was the key official in bringing Lucas down is Hollywood's imagination." Even Roberts has stated that his character in the film is more of a composite of several investigators' work and not an accurate portrayal of him.

Lucas was a petty criminal until he became associated with Harlem crime lord Ellsworth "Bumpy" Johnson (1905-1968). After Johnson's death, Lucas sought advancement by bypassing the Italian Mafia's control of the New York City heroin trade and obtained his heroin direct from Asia's Golden Triangle, often travelling to Bangkok, Thailand, and using military personnel to transport narcotics. Lucas frequently boasted that he smuggled heroin back to the United States by using the coffins of American servicemen killed in the Vietnam War. However, that claim has been disputed by his associate in Southeast Asia, Leslie "Ike" Atkinson, who was nicknamed "Sergeant Smack" by the Drug Enforcement Administration investigators. Atkinson claimed that the drugs were transported in furniture, coffins, and holed-out portions on the bottom but not in bodies.

Lucas and his associates, who were largely drawn from family and close friends, sold heroin under the name "Blue Magic" and claimed that it was 98-100% pure when it was shipped from Thailand. However, it was cut with mannite and quinine and resulted in a final product that was only 10 percent pure when it hit the streets. However, that was much better than the rival "brands," which were lucky to be at 5 percent purity and likely less. By bypassing the trafficking middlemen, using innovative shipping, and providing a higher-quality product, Lucas to dominated the market through the sale of heroin at inexpensive prices. Lucas claimed that he earned $1 million a day selling heroin from his base of operations on 116th Street, Manhattan, but that was later believed to be an exaggeration. Roberts disclosed on the WBGO 88.3 public radio program Conversations With Allan Wolper that heroin dealers in New York area were claiming their drugs were "Blue Magic," hoping to take advantage of the publicity generated by American Gangster.

In January 1975, Lucas's residence in Teaneck, New Jersey, was raided by a task force consisting of agents from Group 22 of the federal Drug Enforcement Administration and detectives from New York Police Department's Organized Crime Control Bureau (OCCB). In 1976, Lucas was convicted of drug trafficking and distribution offenses and sentenced to 70 years in prison (a consecutive 40-year federal prison sentence and 30-year New Jersey state prison sentence). After cooperation in the prosecution of over 100 other drug-related cases, Lucas was offered placement in the federal witness protection program, and in 1981, after five years in prison custody, his sentence was reduced to "time served" with lifetime parole supervision. After violating parole with a minor drug distribution offense, Lucas, who was defended by Roberts, was returned to prison and was released in 1991.

=== Depictions in media ===
The story of Roberts' investigation and prosecution of Frank Lucas was adapted into the 2007 film American Gangster, starring Academy Award-winning actors Denzel Washington portraying Lucas and Russell Crowe portraying Roberts. The film grossed more than US$127 million and was met with generally-positive reviews. However, several people involved with the actual events regarding the investigation and prosecution (including Lucas and Roberts) have criticized the film as a largely fictional and exaggerated portrayal that contained inaccuracies and fabrication.

The film portrays Roberts as being mired in a personal child custody battle and suggests that aspect of his personal life was compromised by his dogged investigation of Lucas. That was entirely fabricated, as Roberts never had a child. Roberts also criticized the portrayal of Lucas as "almost noble".

Sterling Johnson, Jr., a federal judge who served as a special narcotics prosecutor and assisted in the arrest and trial of Lucas, described the film as "one percent reality and ninety-nine percent Hollywood." In addition, Johnson described the real-life Lucas as "illiterate, vicious, violent, and everything Denzel Washington was not." In 2008, former DEA agents filed a lawsuit against Universal Studios that alleged that the events depicted in the film defamed them and hundreds of other agents.
