= United States v. Thomas =

United States v. Thomas may refer to:

- United States v. Thomas (1873), 82 U.S. 337
- United States v. Thomas (1894), 151 U.S. 577
- United States v. Thomas (1904), 195 U.S. 418
- United States v. Thomas (1962), 13 U.S.C.M.A. 278, on the impossibility defense
- United States v. Thomas (1997), 116 F.3d 606 (2d Cir. 1997), on removing a juror from a jury
