= American Gangster (film) =

2007 film by Ridley Scott

- Theatrical release poster
- Directed by: Ridley Scott
- Screenplay by: Steven Zaillian
- Based on: "The Return of Superfly" by Mark Jacobson
- Produced by: Ridley Scott; Brian Grazer
- Starring: Russell Crowe; Denzel Washington; Chiwetel Ejiofor; Cuba Gooding Jr.; Josh Brolin; Ted Levine; Armand Assante; John Ortiz; John Hawkes; RZA
- Cinematography: Harris Savides
- Edited by: Pietro Scalia
- Music by: Marc Streitenfeld
- Production companies: Imagine Entertainment; Scott Free Productions; Relativity Media
- Distributed by: Universal Pictures
- Release dates: October 19, 2007 (Apollo Theater); November 2, 2007 (United States)
- Running time: 157 minutes
- Country: United States
- Language: English
- Budget: $100 million
- Box office: $269.8 million

American Gangster is a 2007 American crime drama film directed and produced by Ridley Scott and written by Steven Zaillian. The biographical film is loosely based on the criminal career of Frank Lucas, a gangster from La Grange, North Carolina who smuggled heroin into the United States on American service planes returning from the Vietnam War, before being detained by a task force led by Newark Detective Richie Roberts. The film stars Denzel Washington and Russell Crowe, with co-stars Ted Levine, John Ortiz, Josh Brolin, Chiwetel Ejiofor, Ruby Dee, Lymari Nadal, Cuba Gooding Jr., Armand Assante, John Hawkes and RZA.

Development for the film initially began in 2000, when Universal Pictures and Imagine Entertainment purchased the rights to a New York magazine story about the rise and fall of Lucas. Two years later, screenwriter Steven Zaillian introduced a 170-page scriptment to Scott. Original production plans were to commence in Toronto for budget purposes; however, production eventually relocated permanently to New York City. Because of the film's rising budget Universal canceled production in 2004. After negotiations with Terry George, it was later revived with Scott at the helm in March 2005. Principal photography commenced over a period of five months from July to December 2006; filming took place throughout New York City and concluded in Thailand.

American Gangster premiered in New York on October 20, 2007, and was released in the United States on November 2. The film was well received by critics and grossed over $266 million worldwide. Many of the people portrayed, including Roberts and Lucas, have stated that the film took much creative license with the story, and three former DEA agents sued Universal claiming the agency's portrayal was demoralizing. American Gangster was nominated for twenty-one awards, including two Oscar nominations for Best Art Direction and Best Supporting Actress for Ruby Dee, who also won a Screen Actors Guild Award for Outstanding Performance by a Female Actor in a Supporting Role.

== Plot ==
In 1968, Frank Lucas is the right-hand chauffeur, collector and bodyguard of Harlem mob kingpin Ellsworth "Bumpy" Johnson. When Johnson dies of a heart attack, Frank enters the heroin trade, buying directly from producers in Thailand and smuggling it into the U.S. through returning Vietnam War servicemen. Frank sells his heroin under the brand "Blue Magic", the affordability and purity of which make it incredibly popular, eliminating much of his competition.

Newark Detective and aspiring lawyer Richie Roberts is ostracized in his precinct after handing in almost $1 million that he found in a mobster's car. Captain Lou Toback puts Roberts in charge of a special task force that targets major drug suppliers, after Roberts' partner overdoses on Blue Magic. Roberts is also having a bitter child custody battle with his ex-wife.

Frank's racket prospers; he eventually sells Blue Magic wholesale to many dealers in the New York Tri-State Area and expands his distribution through other criminal organizations. With this monopoly, Frank becomes Harlem's top crime lord, opening legitimate business fronts and maintaining a low profile, while befriending politicians and famous celebrities (such as former World Heavyweight Champion Joe Louis). He buys a mansion for his mother and recruits his five brothers as his lieutenants. Frank eventually falls in love with and marries Eva, a Puerto Rican beauty queen. He attends the Fight of the Century with her, where Roberts spots Frank, notices he has better seats than the Italian mobsters, and begins investigating him. Frank also comes to odds with competing local gangster Nicky Barnes; corrupt NYPD detective Nick Trupo, who is among many people Frank is forced to bribe; and the Corsican mafia, who unsuccessfully attempt to assassinate Frank and his wife for putting them out of business.

One night, Roberts' detectives witness one of Frank's cousins, Jimmy Zee, shoot his girlfriend; he agrees to become their informant to avoid being charged. He wears a wire, through which they learn that Frank has negotiated one final shipment of heroin after the fall of Saigon. They identify and search the plane carrying Lucas' stock, discovering that it is being smuggled in the coffins of dead servicemen. They follow the drugs into Newark's projects and obtain a warrant to raid Frank's heroin processing facility, resulting in the death of Frank's nephew Stevie Lucas and the arrest of brother Huey. They then arrest the other four brothers, and finally Frank himself.

During Frank's trial, he accepts Roberts' offer of leniency in return for informing on corrupt police officers. As a result, three-quarters of the New York DEA and many NYPD officers are arrested and convicted, while Trupo commits suicide to prevent prosecution. Roberts becomes a defense attorney with Frank as his first client. Frank is sentenced to 70 years in prison, serving 15 years and being released in 1991.

== Cast ==
- Russell Crowe as Detective Richie Roberts
- Denzel Washington as Frank Lucas
- Josh Brolin as Detective Nick Trupo
- Chiwetel Ejiofor as Huey Lucas
- Ruby Dee as Mahalee Lucas, Frank's Mother
- Lymari Nadal as Eva
- Armand Assante as Dominic Cattano
- Carla Gugino as Laurie Roberts
- Cuba Gooding Jr. as Nicky Barnes
- Ted Levine as Captain Lou Toback
- Idris Elba as "Tango"
- John Hawkes as Detective Freddie Spearman
- John Ortiz as Detective Javier J. Rivera
- RZA as Detective Moses Jones
- Roger Guenveur Smith as Nate (Note: Fictionalized version of Leslie "Ike" Atkinson)
- Yul Vazquez as Detective Alfonse Abruzzo
- Joe Morton as Charlie Williams
- Common as Turner Lucas
- Tip Harris as Stevie Lucas
- Ritchie Coster as Joey Sadano
- Jon Polito as Rossi
- Kevin Corrigan as Campizi
- Malcolm Goodwin as Jimmy Zee
- Ric Young as Khun Sa
- Roger Bart as U.S. Attorney
- KaDee Strickland as Richie's Attorney
- Ruben Santiago-Hudson as "Doc"
- Norman Reedus as Detective Norman Reilly
- Melissia Hill as "Redtop"
- Robert Funaro as Detective McCann
- Clarence Williams III as Ellsworth "Bumpy" Johnson (uncredited)

== Production ==
=== Development and writing ===
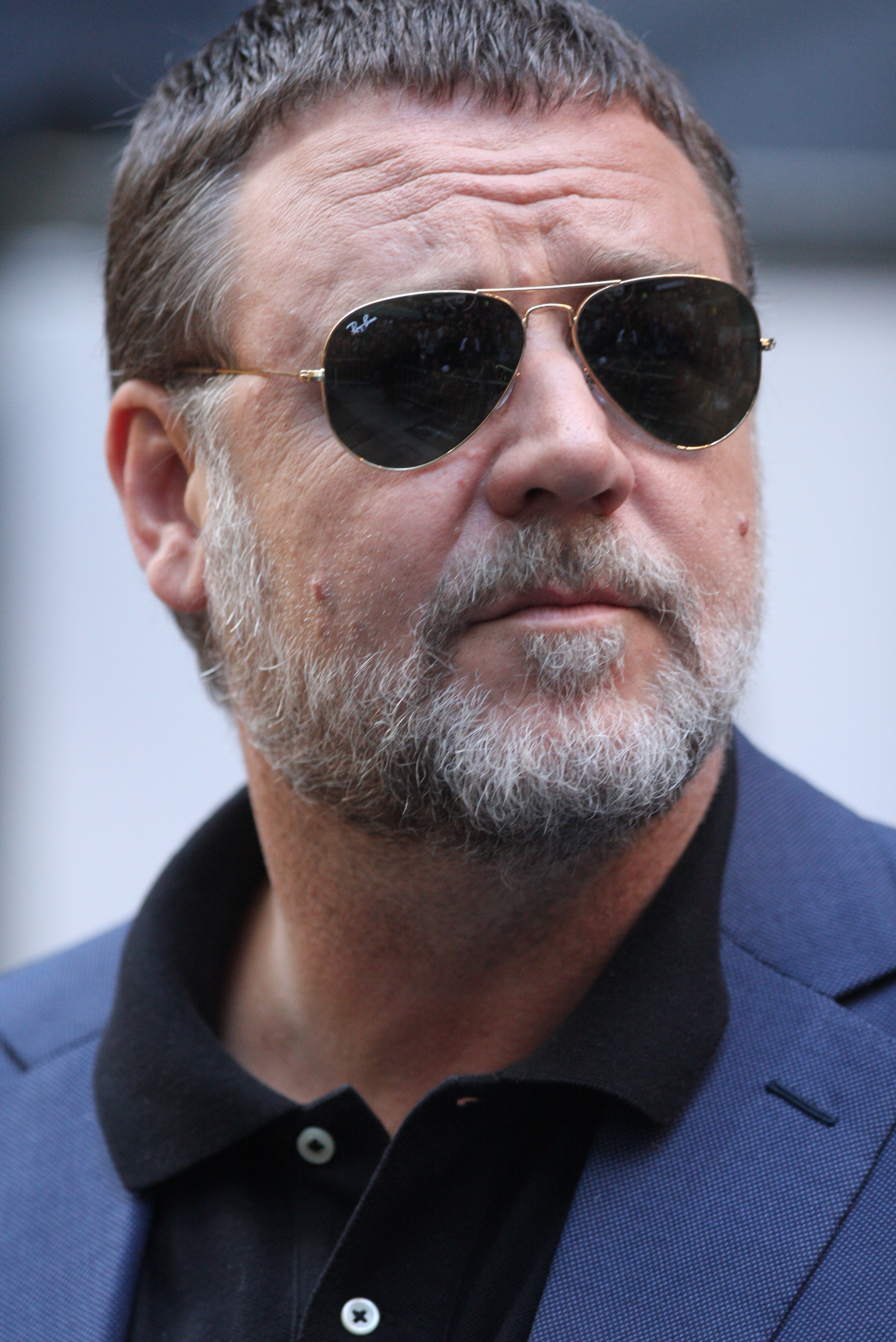
Russell Crowe (pictured here in 2017) worked with director Ridley Scott on the film's script.

In 2000, Universal Pictures and Imagine Entertainment purchased the rights to "The Return of Superfly", by Mark Jacobson, an article published in New York magazine story about the rise and fall of the 1970s heroin kingpin Frank Lucas. In 2002, screenwriter Steven Zaillian brought a 170-page script to director Ridley Scott, who expressed interest in making two films from it. However, Scott did not immediately pursue the project, choosing to make Kingdom of Heaven instead. In November 2003, Universal and Imagine entered negotiations with Brian De Palma to direct Tru Blu, with a script by Zaillian based on the life of Frank Lucas. Zaillian interpreted the account as one of "American business and race", focusing the script thematically on corporate business. Production was initially slated for a spring 2004 start.

In March 2004, the studio entered new negotiations with Antoine Fuqua to direct, as well as Denzel Washington to star in the film as Frank Lucas. The following May, Benicio del Toro entered negotiations to star as Richie Roberts, the detective who brought down Lucas. Production of Tru Blu was reset to begin in early fall 2004, with the film slated for a release date of June 3, 2005. In September 2004, Dania Ramirez entered negotiations to join the cast of the film, now titled American Gangster.

Universal Pictures reported that it greenlit American Gangster with a budget of $80 million, which escalated to $93 million, with $10 million for development costs and $3 million for the delay of the production start date. Sources close to the director insist that the budget was $93 million from the beginning. The studio also sought for American Gangster to be produced in Toronto rather than New York City to save money, but Fuqua resisted the re-location. The studio's parent company General Electric received tax credits in New York City, so production was moved to the city. This change increased the budget to $98 million. Fuqua's camp insisted that it was seeking ways to reduce the budget, but the studio argued about several aspects of the project under him. The director had wanted to film a Vietnam sequence in Thailand and to cast notable names such as Ray Liotta and John C. Reilly in minor roles. To add to the studio's budgetary concerns, Fuqua was rewriting the script during the pre-production process. The director did not have a shot-list, final locations, and supporting actors signed to initiate production.

Fuqua was fired on October 1, 2004, four weeks before principal photography would begin. The studio cited creative differences for its action. After Fuqua's departure, the studio met with Peter Berg to take over directing the film, and Washington had approved of the choice. Due to the search potentially escalating a budget already in the US$80 million range and the difficulty in recouping the amount based on the film's subject matter, Universal canceled production of American Gangster, citing time constraints and creative elements. The cancellation cost the studio $30 million, of which $20 million went to Washington and $5 million went to del Toro due to their pay or play contracts.

"When I met Frank, I really understood what I saw as the arc of the character. He wears nice clothes and drives fancy cars and all that, so if that means glorifying it I guess that's the case. But for me I was looking at the arc of the character, and he don't look that glorious right now."

— Denzel Washington discussing the arc of Frank Lucas

In March 2005, American Gangster was revived as Universal and Imagine entered negotiations with Terry George to revise Zaillian's script and direct the film, which was to be financed with a target budget of US$50 million. Will Smith was approached to replace Washington as Frank Lucas, though an offer would be postponed until George completed his revision of the script. George cut many key scenes, characters and Asian locations to reduce costs, but the project failed to progress given financial problems and producer Grazer feeling they "couldn't make it right" without the removed material.

After Scott and Zaillian met on another project, Zaillian brought up the "Gangster" project again with Scott, who decided he was ready to do it. Producer Brian Grazer and Imagine executive Jim Whitaker decided against pursuing George's attempt and to return to Zaillian's vision. In February 2006, Ridley Scott entered talks with the studio to take over American Gangster from George, returning to Zaillian's draft as the film's basis. Washington returned to his role as Lucas, and Russell Crowe was attached to star as Roberts. Crowe was drawn to the project based on his previous work with the director on Gladiator and A Good Year, Washington wanted to work with Crowe again, after 1995's Virtuosity. Production was slated for summer 2006.

Scott had discussed the script with Crowe as they worked on A Good Year in France, and they sought to take on the project. The director reviewed Zaillian's script, Terry George's rewrite, and a revision by Richard Price during the project's incarnation with director Antoine Fuqua. Scott preferred Zaillian's approach and chose to follow it. The director encountered a challenge in the script since the characters Frank Lucas and Richie Roberts do not encounter each other until twenty minutes before the end of the film. The director sought to flesh out the private universes of these characters, which would evolve, and to have scenes cut between the two characters to provide a balance. Elements such as Frank Lucas's interaction with his family and Richie Roberts's dysfunctional marriage were written to add to the characters' backgrounds. The rappers T.I., RZA, and Common were added to the cast to appeal to younger audiences.

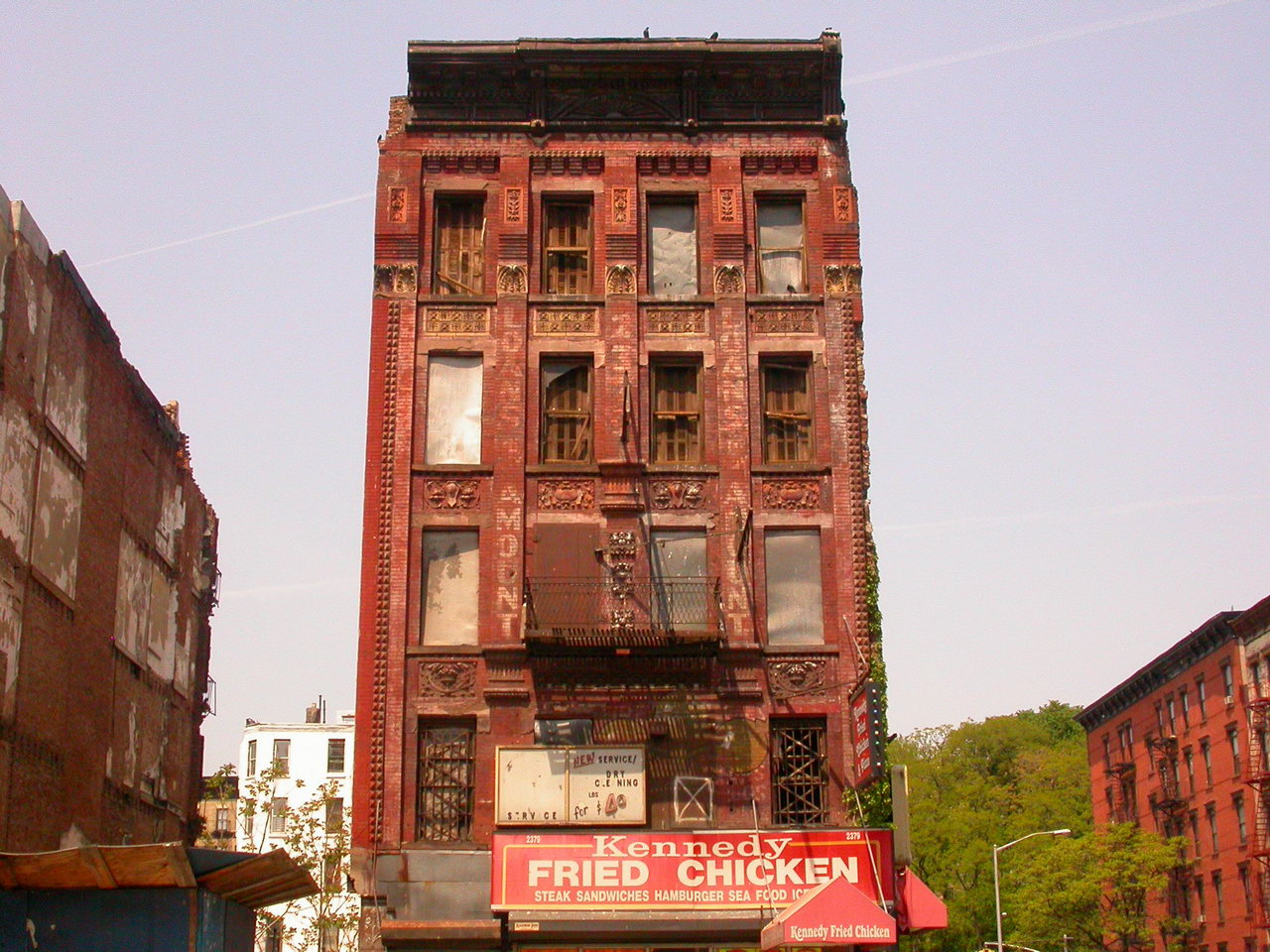
Many abandoned buildings in Harlem were shot in order to give an accurate and authentic depiction of the area in the 1970s.

Scott chose to direct American Gangster by highlighting the paradoxical values of Frank Lucas and Richie Roberts. The film somewhat focuses on the comparatively ethical business practices of the "wicked gangster" and the womanizing and failed marriage of the "do-gooder" police detective. Washington, who was not normally a fan of gangster films, chose to portray Lucas when he saw "the arc of the character", which ended by showing the prices that Lucas paid for his actions.

To prepare for their roles, the actors met the actual persons. In addition, Washington took on Lucas' Southern accent, and Crowe practiced to match Roberts's manner of speaking and body language, requesting tape recordings of Roberts to assist in his preparation. The following March, the studio rehired Zaillian to rewrite the script for American Gangster. The budget had escalated to $100 million, which Grazer stated was unexpected given "It's not a high-concept comedy, it's not a fantasy movie, it's not a four-quadrant movie". Grazer and Scott still had to pay back the studio $3 million for a budget overrun.

=== Filming ===
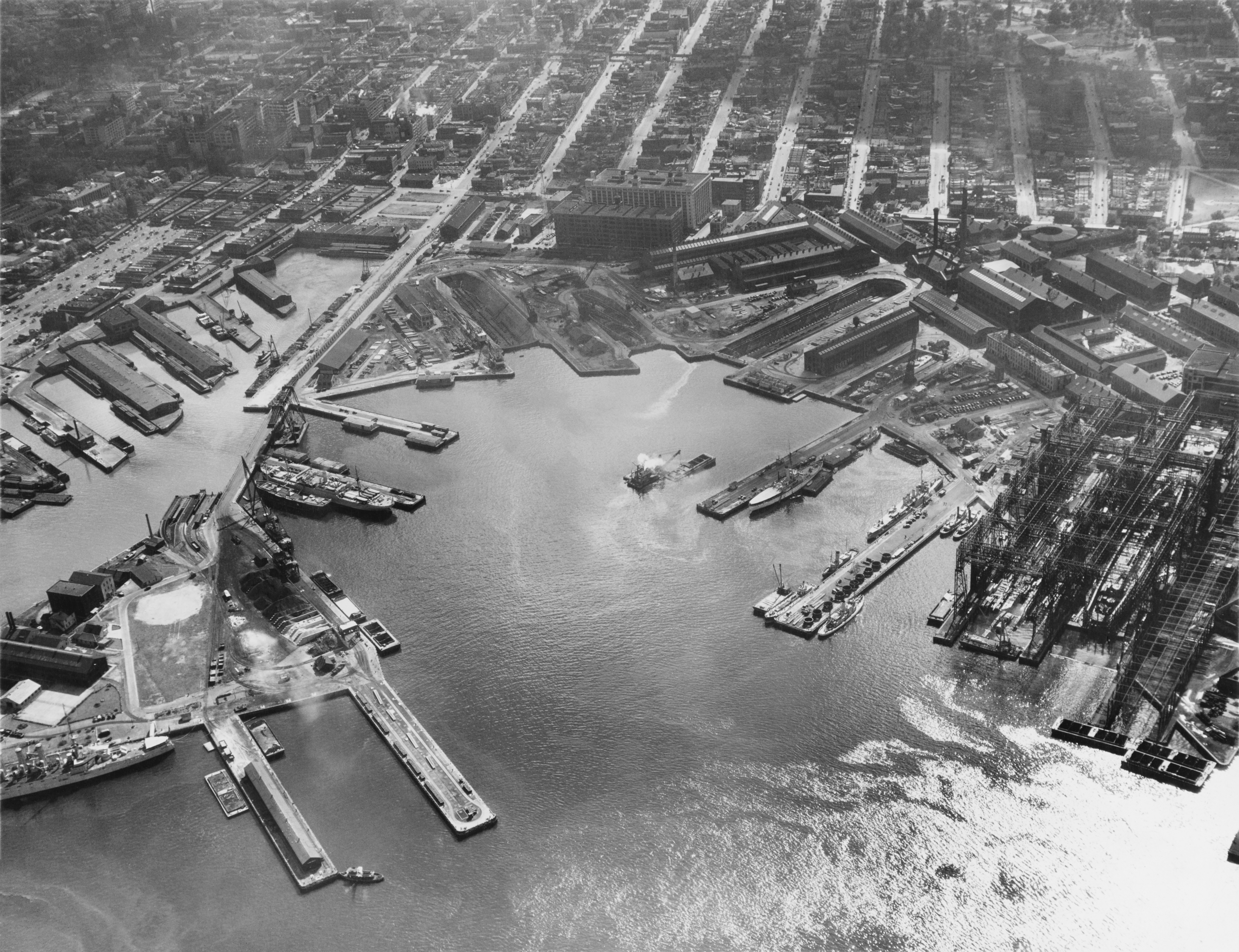
Principal photography took place in locations throughout New York, including the Brooklyn Navy Yard.

Principal photography began in July 2006 in New York City. American Gangster was filmed over a period of approximately four months in over 180 different locations, most of them across New York; it set the record for containing the highest number of filming locations of a movie. Two months were spent in New York, with all the city's five boroughs being used. Approximately fifty to sixty locations were set in Harlem alone. While in the neighbourhood, Scott stated that he found several interiors that had been untouched since the 1940s.

According to production designer Arthur Max, exhaustive location scouting was done to find parts of New York that could still resemble the city of the early 1970s, filming Lucas' headquarters at 116th Street 20 blocks north, on 136th Street. In his interview with ComingSoon.net, Scott stated that "[he] just walked in […] and […] just sho[o]t in the house." Several gas masks were brought by producers due to health hazards and sanitary concerns existing in the buildings. Scott found filming in Harlem to be difficult, commenting that the rapid gentrification in Harlem provided poor opportunities for shooting angles. Hand-held cameras were extensively used to capture a raw, 1970s-style realism.

Other locations for principal photography include the Brooklyn Navy Yard, the Nassau Veterans Memorial Coliseum, Old Westbury Gardens, a segment of the George Washington Bridge, and the Brooklyn Supreme Courthouse. Briarcliff Manor in upstate New York had the locations for both the Lucas farm and the estate Lucas buys for his family. Morgue scenes were filmed in Morristown, New Jersey. Filming locations began setting up in Thailand in November 2006, after Branko Lustig consulted with Suvit Yodmanee, the country's tourism minister. Filming for American Gangster concluded in Chiang Mai the following month.

Using his experience from visiting New York in the same time period in which the film's story took place, Scott sought to downplay a "Beatles" atmosphere to the film and to instead create a shabbier atmosphere, saying that "Harlem was really, really shabby, beautiful brownstones falling apart." Production and costume design was emphasized, transforming the location into the rundown streets of upper Manhattan from the late 1960s and early 1970s. Denzel Washington, as Frank Lucas, had 64 costume changes.

=== Music ===
In 2006, Greg Calloway was approached by producers to produce a soundtrack for the film. He presented the idea to Atlantic Records chairman Craig Kallman, and one of the company's artists, T.I., got an acting role in the film. However, the deal did not go further because Universal Pictures owned the rights to the film; "It was a Universal film and they were not going to give the soundtrack to WMG" (Atlantic's parent company). Thus Scott brought back Marc Streitenfeld, who had worked with him in A Good Year. The composer stated that "the overall tone needed to be something bigger and darker" given the characters' strong personalities, and while not being the original intention, he added shades of blues and soul music to fit the 1970s setting. The musical score for American Gangster was recorded between April and May 2007 by Streitenfeld, with the help of orchestrator Bruce Fowler and conductor Mike Nowak, using an 80-piece orchestra recorded in sections as well as acoustic pre-records, performed by Streitenfeld himself. Additional score material was composed and recorded by Hank Shocklee.

The official soundtrack album for American Gangster was released by Def Jam Recordings within a week of the film's release. In addition to Streitenfeld and Shocklee's score material, the soundtrack album also features songs influenced by music in the 1960s and 1970s, including from blues and soul musicians such as Bobby Womack, The Staple Singers, Sam & Dave, and John Lee Hooker. Grazer stated that "I wanted to introduce a visual and sonic world that is a contained entity of the '70s", and Scott felt it was vital to have "the brand of music that was Harlem at the time."

Denzel Washington pressed Grazer into inviting rapper Jay-Z to write the film's score, but the producer "just didn't think there'd be enough for Jay-Z to do" given the intentions to do a soundtrack filled with 1970s music. The film's trailer had already used Jay-Z's "Heart of the City (Ain't No Love)", and the rapper was invited to an advanced screening. The film had a profound resonance on the musician, who decided to create a concept album, also entitled American Gangster. The rapper recorded tracks that were prompted by specific scenes in the film. It was speculated that the album's release in conjunction with the film would attract a young audience and help Universal Pictures generate profits to recover from the film's troubled development history. According to Jay-Z:

"It was like I was watching the film, and putting it on pause, and giving a back story to the story. It immediately clicked with me. Like Scarface or any one of those films, you take the good out of it, and you can see it as an inspiring film."

== Release ==
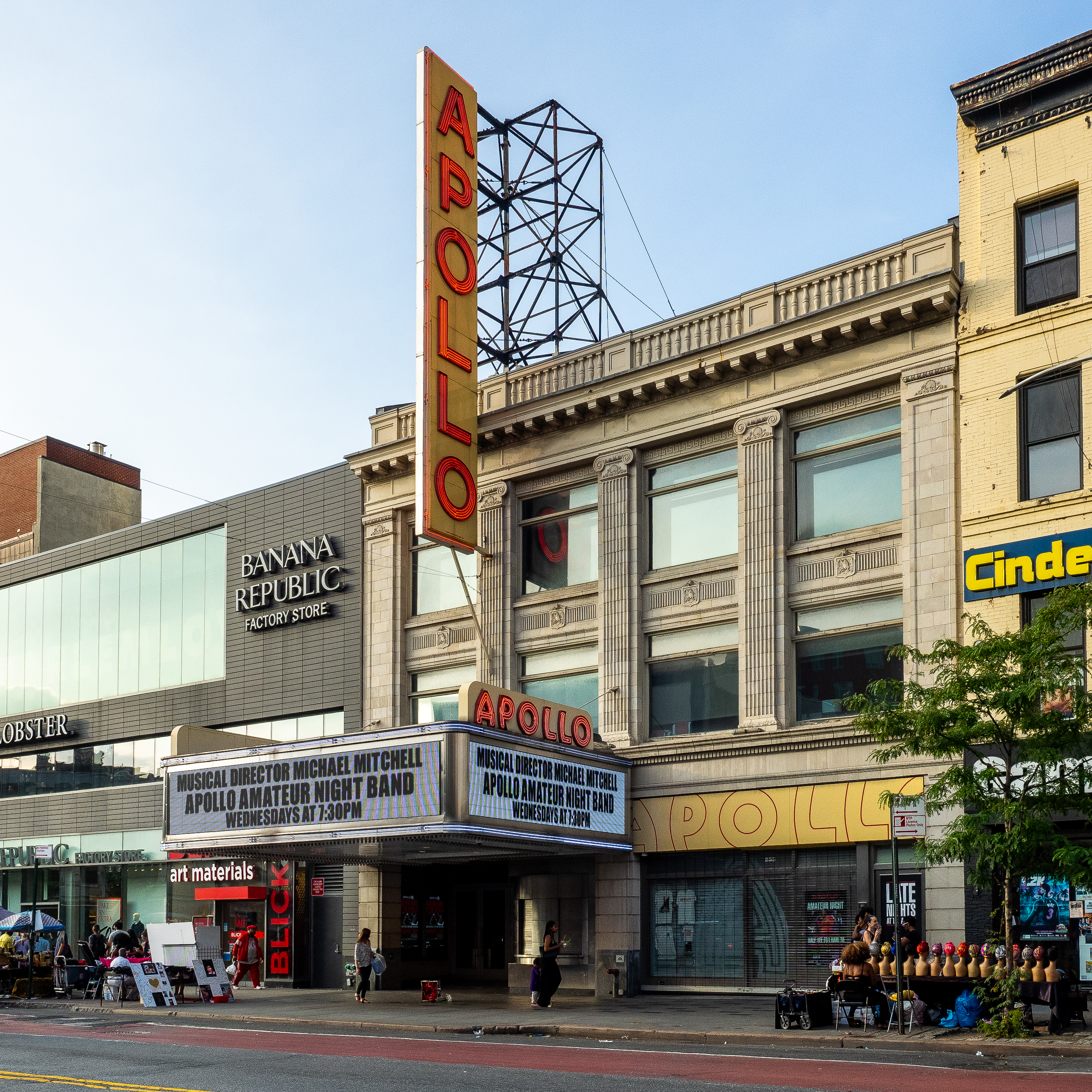
The film's premiere was at the Apollo Theater in Harlem.

American Gangster premiered in Harlem at the Apollo Theater on October 20, 2007. Over two weeks before the release of American Gangster, a screener for the film leaked online. The film debuted in the United States and Canada on November 2, 2007, in 3,054 theaters.

=== Home media ===
American Gangster was released in DVD and HD DVD format on February 19, 2008. The home release included an unrated extended version of the film, featuring 18 additional minutes and an alternative ending. The film topped both the DVD sales charts with 4 million units during its first week in stores, more than three times as many copies as second place Michael Clayton, and the rental charts. American Gangster ended up as the 14th best-selling DVD of 2008. It also topped the high-definition charts despite being released in the same week Toshiba announced it would discontinue the HD DVD format. On October 14, the film saw its release on Blu-ray.

=== Video game ===
A mobile game based on the film was released by Gameloft on November 1, 2007.

== Reception ==
=== Box office ===
In its opening weekend in the United States and Canada, it grossed an estimated $43.6 million, averaging $14,264 per theater, placing the film first in the weekend box office. It marked the biggest opening weekend out of any film in both Washington and Crowe's careers. In its second week, grosses declined by 44.8 percent to $24 million, being beaten out by Bee Movie. In contrast by its third week, screenings for American Gangster increased to 3,110 theaters as the film surpassed the $100 million mark. American Gangster finished its box office run in North America with $130,164,645.

The film experienced similar success overseas. American Gangster was released in the United Kingdom on November 16, and became the highest-grossing film of the week, garnering £2.6 million ($5.3 million) in the box office. It repeated the feat in its second week, grossing an estimated £1.82 million ($3.7 million) at the box office and beating out Beowulf two consecutive times. The weekend of November 16–18 saw American Gangster take $14.7 million from fourteen territories internationally. At the same time, American Gangster expanded in the European market; it received $2.8 million from 366 theaters in Germany and $3.6 million from 366 screens in France during its opening weekend.

Releases followed in Norway and Sweden the succeeding week, where it earned $392,608 and $465,238 from thirty-seven and fifty-nine theaters, respectively. The film was released in the United Arab Emirates during the film's sixth week and grossed a modest $281,922 at the box office during its first week in the emirate. Similarly, it earned $6.9 million in international markets during its sixth week, adding the total at the time to $40.9 million.

By January 25, 2008, American Gangster opened in thirty-seven markets, bringing international grosses to $93 million. In February, screenings for the film debuted in Mexico—with a modest $820,482 opening weekend—and Japan, where it opened at the box office with $2.3 million, landing in second place. American Gangster grossed over $266.5 million worldwide at the box office, with international grosses making up 51 percent ($136.3 million). It ranked as the 19th highest-grossing film of 2007 both domestically and worldwide.

=== Critical response ===
Review aggregate Rotten Tomatoes reports that 81% of critics have given the film a positive review based on 218 reviews, with a rating average of 7.00/10, with the consensus being: "American Gangster is a gritty and entertaining throwback to classic gangster films, with its lead performers firing on all cylinders." On Metacritic, which assigns a weighted mean score out of 100 to reviews from film critics, the film has a score of 76 based on 38 reviews. Audiences polled by CinemaScore gave the film an average grade of "B+" on an A+ to F scale.

"Like many moviemakers […], Mr. Scott loves his bad guy too much. And by turning Lucas into a figure who seduces instead of repels, an object of directorial fetishism and a token of black resistance, however hollow, he encourages us to submit as well. Part of this is structural and economic: blood and nihilism are always better sells than misery and hopelessness. Yet there's also a historical dimension because when Lucas strolls down a fast-emptying Harlem street after putting a bullet into another man's head and the camera pulls back for the long view, you are transported into the realm of myth. Once, another gunman, or the director, might have taken direct aim at Lucas. But the world belongs to gangsters now, not cowboys."

— Manohla Dargis of The New York Times

Roger Ebert of the Chicago Sun-Times gave the film a perfect four-star rating and opined, "This is an engrossing story, told smoothly and well." Ebert also praised Crowe's performance, saying that his contribution to the storytelling was "enormous". Paul Byrnes of The Sydney Morning Herald felt that American Gangster was "one of the most intelligent gangster films in years" and expressed that the film offers "the spectacle of grand themes and two bigger-than-life characters played by two of the best actors in cinema." Concluding his review, Byrnes gave the film four out of four stars.

IGN's Jim "Stax" Vejvoda rated the film four out of five stars, praising the acting—particularly of the two protagonists, "both dynamic presences on-screen, with neither actor outweighing the other's importance to the story"—and declaring that despite being preceded by other gangster stories such as Scarface and The Sopranos, American Gangster managed to justify its existence with "emphasis on the human and class elements of the story". Manohla Dargis of The New York Times strongly commended the film, opining that "greatness hovers just outside American Gangster." She continued: "It's a seductive package, crammed with all the on-screen and off-screen talent that big-studio money can buy, and filled with old soul and remixed funk that evoke the city back in the day, when heroin turned poor streets white and sometimes red." These sentiments were echoed by Sukhdev Sandhu of The Telegraph, who asserted that the storyline was "amazing".

In comparison, some reviewers were more critical of American Gangster. Jonathan Crocker of Time Out London was polarized with the film, criticizing its aesthetics. In his review, he wrote, "Scott's meticulous aesthetics can't touch the urban texture and deep focus of The French Connection, The Godfather, Serpico and Prince of the City – all looming heavily in intertextual nods." In contrast, Crocker praised Washington's acting, writing, "He's immense: centering every scene with tractor-beam charisma, that dangerous, easy charm hovering between a luxury smile or blazing violence." In conclusion, Crocker gave the film three out of five stars.

Similarly, Owen Gleiberman of Entertainment Weekly gave the film a 'C−' grade, expressing that American Gangster is "never dull, but it could have used more good old-fashioned melodramatic intrigue." Gleiberman found Washington's performance to have "a ghastly ingenuity". Empire's Ian Freer rated the film three stars out of five; he stated that it was "undeniably enjoyable" and praised the cast, but also noted that he felt that "very little in the movie feels fresh, re-treading scenes, riffs and imagery from the whole history of crime flicks" and that the film did not explore enough of Lucas' story and Scott's visual imagination.

Slant Magazine journalist Nick Schager harshly criticized the film, giving the film a one out of four stars rating. Schager remarked that the film was "dumb as a rock", and that it was "far too convinced of its import to be any fun." Giving American Gangster a two out of five stars, Peter Bradshaw of The Guardian was disappointed with Washington's acting, asserting, "He doesn't seem to relax and enjoy himself in the role, or even inhabit it very satisfyingly." He resumed: "He never has the menace of his dirty cop in Training Day, and we don't see anything like the transformation from street-hustler to leader in Malcolm X. That shoulder-shimmying swagger is rarely seen, and the brand-classic robes of American Gangster sit on him heavily."

==== Accuracy of the film ====
Lucas admitted to several news outlets that a small portion of the film was true, and that much of it was fabricated for dramatic effect. In addition, Richie Roberts criticized the film for portraying him in a custody battle while in real life he never had a child. Roberts criticized the portrayal of Lucas, describing it as "almost noble".

Sterling Johnson Jr., a federal judge who served as a special narcotics prosecutor for the United States District Court for the Eastern District of New York and assisted the arrest and trial of Lucas, described the film as "one percent reality and ninety-nine percent Hollywood." In addition, Johnson described the real-life Lucas as "illiterate, vicious, violent, and everything Denzel Washington was not." Former DEA agents Jack Toal, Gregory Korniloff, and Louis Diaz filed a lawsuit against Universal saying that the events in the film were fictionalized and that the film defamed them and hundreds of other agents.

The lawsuit was eventually dismissed by US District Judge Colleen McMahon. While McMahon noted that the intertitle that appears at the end of the film, stating that Lucas' collaboration led to the arrest of many corrupt DEA agents, was "wholly inaccurate", in that Lucas' cooperation did not lead to the convictions, and opined that "[i]t would behoove a major corporation like Universal (which is owned by a major news organization, NBC) not to put inaccurate statements at the end of popular films", she stated that the film failed to meet legal standards of defamation because it failed to "show a single person who is identifiable as a DEA agent".

Many of Lucas' other claims, as presented in the film, have also been called into question, such as being the right-hand man of Bumpy Johnson, rising above the power of the Mafia and Nicky Barnes, and that he was the mastermind behind the Golden Triangle heroin connection of the 1970s. Ron Chepesiuk, a biographer of Frank Lucas, deemed the story a myth. Associated Press entertainment writer Frank Coyle noted that "this mess happened partly because journalists have been relying on secondary sources removed from the actual events."

=== Accolades ===
American Gangster earned various awards and nominations, in categories ranging from recognition of the film itself to the performances of Ruby Dee and Denzel Washington. Prior to the film's release, it was observed as a candidate for the Academy Awards based on its style and the performances of its actors, including the possibility of an Academy Award for Best Director for Ridley Scott.

| Award | Category | Recipient | Result |
|---|---|---|---|
| Academy Awards | Best Supporting Actress | Ruby Dee | Nominated |
| Academy Awards | Best Art Direction | Arthur Max and Beth A. Rubino | Nominated |
| BAFTA Awards | Best Film | | Nominated |
| BAFTA Awards | Best Original Screenplay | Steven Zaillian | Nominated |
| BAFTA Awards | Best Cinematography | Harris Savides | Nominated |
| BAFTA Awards | Best Music | Marc Streitenfeld | Nominated |
| BAFTA Awards | Best Editing | Pietro Scalia | Nominated |
| Golden Globe Awards | Best Motion Picture – Drama | | Nominated |
| Golden Globe Awards | Best Director | Ridley Scott | Nominated |
| Golden Globe Awards | Best Actor – Motion Picture Drama | Denzel Washington | Nominated |
| Empire Awards | Best Thriller | | Won |
| Satellite Awards | Best Actor | Denzel Washington | Nominated |
| Satellite Awards | Best Supporting Actress | Ruby Dee | Nominated |
| Satellite Awards | Best Editing | Pietro Scalia | Won |
| Satellite Awards | Best Original Song | Anthony Hamilton; For the song "Do You Feel Me" | Nominated |
| Screen Actors Guild Award | Best Supporting Actress | Ruby Dee | Won |
| Screen Actors Guild Award | Best Cast | | Nominated |

The film was recognized as a candidate for best film by the National Association for the Advancement of Colored People and the Broadcast Film Critics Association. In addition, the film was included on 54 reviewer lists of the ten best films of 2007, three of them at the top spot. Among the lists ranking American Gangster as one of the best of the year were those of The Miami Herald, Rolling Stone and the Associated Press.

The film's novelisation, by Max Allan Collins won a Scribe Award for Best Adapted Novel in 2008.

== Related television series ==
In October 2017, it was announced that a prequel television series to American Gangster was in development, with Forest Whitaker attached to star as Ellsworth "Bumpy" Johnson. The series would later be titled Godfather of Harlem but was no longer connected to the film.

== See also ==
- Virtuosity, 1995 film starring Crowe and Washington in switched antagonist/protagonist roles
- List of hood films
