= Special Narcotics Prosecutor for the City of New York =

- Incumbent; Bridget G. Brennan since May 1, 1998; 28 years ago
- Abbreviation: SNP
- Member of: District Attorneys Association of the State of New York
- Reports to: independent agency
- Appointer: County District Attorneys (DA) of New York City: Bronx DA, Brooklyn DA, Manhattan DA, Queens DA, Staten Island DA
- Formation: 1971; 55 years ago
- First holder: Frank J. Rogers
- Deputy: Steven M. Goldstein, Chief Assistant District Attorney
- Website: www.snpnyc.org

The Special Narcotics Prosecutor for the City of New York is a city-wide position appointed by the five county district attorneys of New York City. The office is responsible for the prosecution of felony violations of narcotics laws within New York City. The current holder of the office is Bridget G. Brennan.

== History ==
The Special Narcotics Prosecutor for the City of New York (SNP) is appointed by the five district attorneys of New York City (Bronx District Attorney, Brooklyn District Attorney, Queens District Attorney, Staten Island District Attorney and Manhattan District Attorney). The office was created by Attorney General of New York Louis J. Lefkowitz under the governorship of Nelson Rockefeller.

The position of the Special Narcotics Prosecutor for the City of New York is notable in several ways:

1. It is a state level position, so it overrides the jurisdiction of the five county district attorneys who appoint the SNP, but its jurisdiction does not extend to the rest of the state.
2. It is a permanent special prosecutor / special deputy attorney general position created via executive orders, not via legislative action.
3. The office is staffed by assistant district attorneys assigned from each of the five borough district attorneys.

One of the better known cases associated with the Special Narcotics Prosecutor is that of Frank Lucas, which was fictionalized in the movie American Gangster.

== List of office holders ==
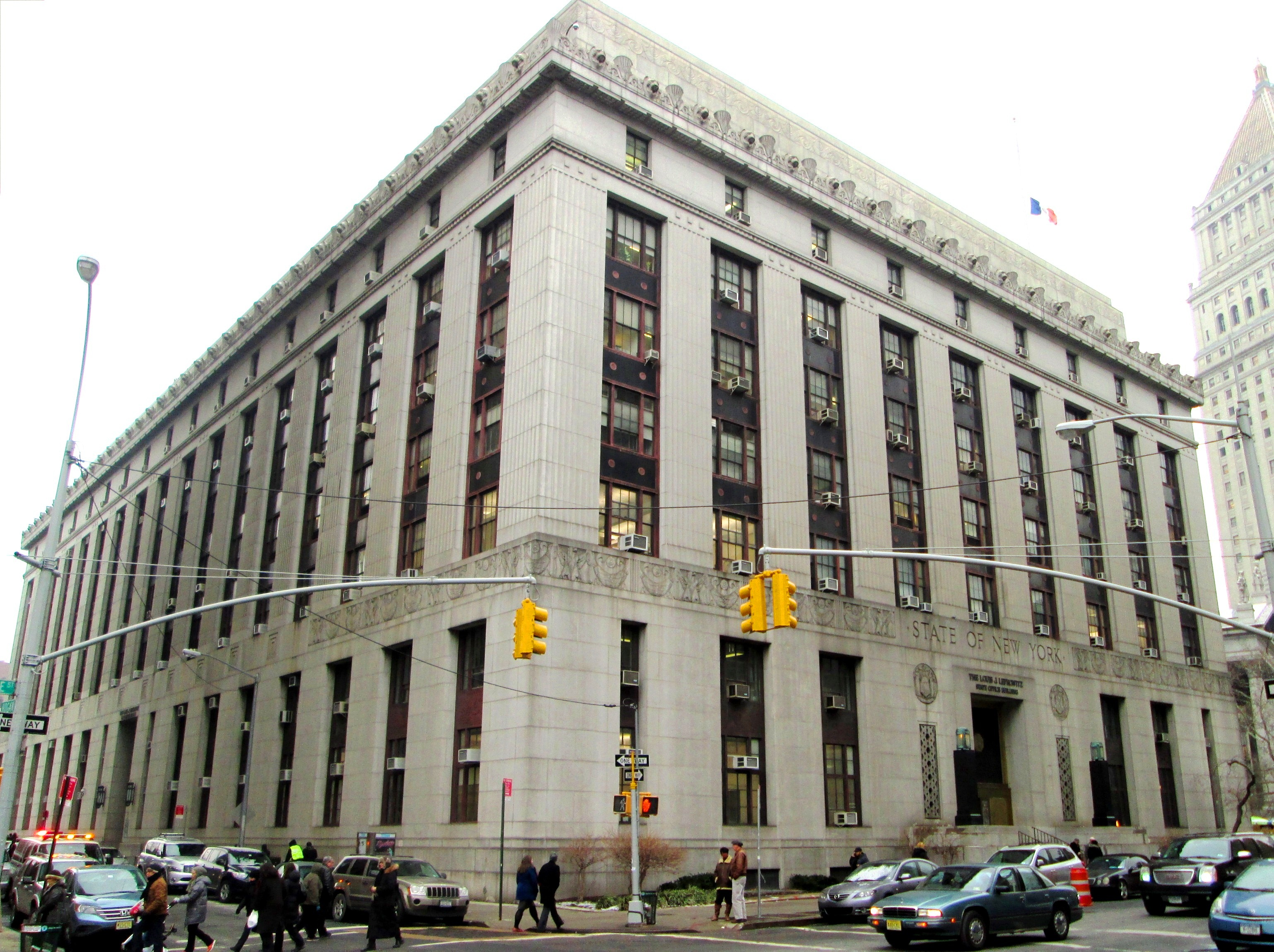
The office operates out of the Louis J. Lefkowitz State Office Building on 80 Centre Street (141 Worth Street).

Special Narcotics Prosecutor	Dates in office	Notes
Frank J. Rogers	February 3, 1972 – May 2, 1975	First Special Narcotics Prosecutor
Sterling Johnson, Jr.	May 2, 1975 – 1991	
Robert H. Silbering	1992 – November 1997	
Bridget G. Brennan	May 1, 1998 – incumbent	Longest serving Special Narcotics Prosecutor

== Partner agencies ==
As a prosecuting attorney office, the Office of the Special Narcotics Prosecutor has its own Investigations Division, and works closely with federal, state, and local law enforcement agencies including:

- Drug Enforcement Administration
- U.S. Postal Service
- New York State Police
- New York Drug Enforcement Task Force
- Port Authority Police
- New York City Police Department's Organized Crime Control Bureau
- Homeland Security Investigations

== See also ==
- Frank Lucas (drug dealer)
- American Gangster (film)
- Opioid epidemic
- Rockefeller Drug Laws
