= Frank Lucas =

American drug lord (1930–2019)

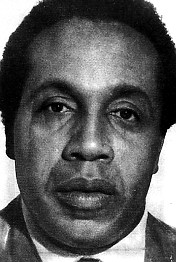
- Lucas in 1975
- Born: September 9, 1930; La Grange, North Carolina, U.S.
- Died: May 30, 2019 (aged 88); Cedar Grove, New Jersey, U.S.
- Occupation: Drug lord
- Spouse: Julie Farrait (m. 1967)
- Children: 7
- Status: Deceased
- Convictions: Drug trafficking (1976 and 1984)
- Penalty: Sentenced to 70 years imprisonment; served five years Sentenced to seven years imprisonment

Frank Lucas (September 9, 1930 – May 30, 2019) was an American drug lord who operated in Harlem, New York City, during the late 1960s and early 1970s. He was known for cutting out middlemen in the drug trade and buying heroin directly from his source in the Golden Triangle in Southeast Asia. Lucas boasted that he smuggled heroin using the coffin pallets of dead American servicemen, as depicted in the feature film American Gangster (2007), which fictionalized aspects of his life. This claim was denied by his Southeast Asian associate Leslie "Ike" Atkinson.

In 1976, Lucas was convicted of drug trafficking and sentenced to 70 years in prison, but after becoming an informant, he and his family were placed in the Witness Protection Program. In 1981, his federal and state prison sentences were reduced to time served plus lifetime parole. In 1984, he was convicted a second time for drug offenses, and was released from prison in 1991. In 2012, he pleaded guilty to attempting to cash a $17,000 federal disability benefit check twice, and because of his age and poor health, received a sentence of five years' probation.

== Early life ==
Lucas was born and raised in La Grange, North Carolina, to Fred and Mahalee (née Jones) Lucas. He said the incident that motivated him to embark on a life of crime was him witnessing his 12-year-old cousin's murder at the hands of the Ku Klux Klan, for looking flirtatiously at a white woman. He drifted through a life of petty crime until one occasion when he got into a fight with a former employer with whose daughter he had been having an affair. In the fight, Lucas hit the father on the head with a pipe, knocking him unconscious. He then stole $400 from the company safe and set the establishment on fire. Later, Frank fled to New York City at the behest of his mother, who feared that he would either be imprisoned for life or lynched. Once in Harlem, he quickly began indulging in petty crime and pool hustling before he was taken under the wing of gangster Bumpy Johnson. Lucas' connection to Johnson has since come under some doubt; he claimed to have been Johnson's driver for 15 years, although Johnson spent just five years out of prison before his death in 1968. According to Johnson's widow, much of the narrative that Lucas claimed as his actually belonged to another young hustler named Zach Walker, who lived with Johnson and his family and later betrayed him.

== Criminal career ==
After Johnson's death, Lucas turned to drug trafficking, and realized that, to be successful, he would have to break the monopoly that the Mafia held over the trade in New York. Traveling to Bangkok, he eventually made his way to Jack's American Star Bar, an R&R hangout for black soldiers. There he met former U.S. Army master sergeant Leslie "Ike" Atkinson, who was from Goldsboro, North Carolina, and married to one of Lucas's cousins. Lucas is quoted as saying, "Ike knew everyone over there, every black guy in the Army, from the cooks on up." Atkinson, who was already running heroin for his own profit and had links to local opium growers, formed a partnership with Lucas.

When interviewed for a New York magazine article published in 2000, Lucas denied putting the drugs inside the corpses of American soldiers. Instead, he flew with a North Carolina carpenter to Bangkok and:

had him make up 28 copies of the government coffins ... except we fixed them up with false bottoms, big enough to load up with six, maybe eight kilos ... It had to be snug. You couldn't have shit sliding around. Ike was very smart, because he made sure we used heavy guys' coffins. He didn't put them in no skinny guy's"

— Frank Lucas

As Lucas pointed out in this interview, "Who the hell is gonna look in a dead soldier's coffin?" However, Atkinson, nicknamed "Sergeant Smack" by the Drug Enforcement Administration (DEA), has said he shipped drugs in hollowed-out furniture, not caskets. Whatever method he used, Lucas was able to smuggle narcotics through this direct link from Asia, thus bypassing the Mafia's French Connection. Lucas said that he made $1 million per day selling drugs on 116th Street, though this was later discovered to be an exaggeration. Federal judge Sterling Johnson, who was the Special Narcotics Prosecutor for the City of New York at the time of Lucas's crimes, called Lucas's operation "one of the most outrageous international dope-smuggling gangs ever, an innovator who got his own connections outside the U.S. and then sold the narcotics himself in the street."

Lucas trusted only relatives and close friends from North Carolina to handle his various heroin operations, believing that they were less likely to steal from him and be tempted by various vices in the big city. He stated his heroin, which was sold under the street name "Blue Magic", was 98–100% pure when shipped from Thailand; since he did not cut it like many of his competitors, the product was extremely addictive and could be sold at higher prices. Lucas also has been quoted as saying that his worth was "something like $52 million", most of it in Cayman Islands banks. Added to this is "maybe 1,000 keys [kilograms; or, 2,200 pounds] of dope on hand" with a potential profit of no less than $300,000 per kilo (2.2 lbs.).

This huge profit margin allowed him to buy property all over the country, including office buildings in Detroit and apartments in Los Angeles and Miami. He also bought a ranch of several thousand acres in North Carolina on which he ranged 300 head of Black Angus cattle, including a breeding bull worth $125,000.

Lucas rubbed shoulders with the elite of the entertainment, political, and criminal worlds of his time, stating later that he had met Howard Hughes at one of Harlem's best clubs in his day. Though he owned several mink and chinchilla coats and other accessories, he was known to dress in inexpensive suits and clothing so as not to attract attention. When he was arrested in the mid-1970s, all of Lucas's assets were seized, as he later recounted:

The properties in Chicago, Detroit, Miami, North Carolina, Puerto Rico — they took everything. My lawyer told me they couldn't take the money in the offshore accounts, and I had all my money stored in the Cayman Islands. But that's BS; they can take it. Take my word for it. If you got something, hide it, 'cause they can go to any bank and take it.

— Frank Lucas

== Arrests and releases ==
In January 1975, Lucas's home in Teaneck, New Jersey, was raided by a task force consisting of 10 agents from Group 22 of the U.S. Drug Enforcement Administration and 10 New York Police Department detectives attached to the Organized Crime Control Bureau (OCCB). In his house, authorities found $584,683 in cash, though Lucas contended that the officers executing the search departed with the full eleven million dollars temporarily stored in his attic, and documented only 5% of the currency seized.

Lucas was convicted of both federal and New Jersey state drug violations, with the case against him built largely on over two years of investigative work and penetration of his distribution network by the "Z-Team" (Eddie Jones, Al Spearman, and Benny Abruzzo). He was sentenced to 70 years in prison. Lucas then cut a deal to provide information that led to over 100 additional drug-related convictions; in exchange, he and his family entered the witness protection program. In 1981, after five years in custody, his 40-year federal term and 30-year state term were reduced to time served plus lifetime parole. In 1984, he was caught and convicted of trying to exchange one ounce of heroin and $13,000 for one kilogram of cocaine. He received a sentence of seven years and was released from prison in 1991. In 2012, while living in Newark, he pleaded guilty to attempting to cash a $17,000 federal disability benefit check twice. Due to his advanced age and his poor health, which included his restriction to a wheelchair, prosecutors agreed to a sentence of five years' probation.

== Depictions in media ==
=== American Gangster (2007) ===
Lucas's life was dramatized in the Universal Pictures crime film American Gangster (2007), in which he was portrayed by Denzel Washington. Lucas was often on set during the filming providing advice— on how he carried his gun, for example.

In an interview with MSNBC, Lucas expressed his excitement about the film and amazement at Washington's portrayal, though he admitted only a small portion of the film was true, much of it fabricated for narrative effect. In addition, Lucas's former prosecutor Richie Roberts criticized the film for portraying him in a custody battle while in real life Roberts never had a child. He also criticized the portrayal of Lucas as a seemingly noble individual.

Judge Sterling Johnson Jr. described the film as "one percent reality and ninety-nine percent Hollywood." In addition, Johnson described the real-life Lucas as "illiterate, vicious, violent, and everything Denzel Washington was not." Former DEA agents Jack Toal, Gregory Korniloff, and Louis Diaz filed a lawsuit against Universal, saying the events in the film were fictionalized and that the film defamed them and hundreds of other agents. The lawsuit was eventually dismissed by U.S. District Judge Colleen McMahon. McMahon noted the intertitle at the end of the film was "wholly inaccurate", in that Lucas's cooperation did not lead to the convictions, and admonished, "It would behoove a major corporation like Universal (which is owned by a major news organization, NBC) not to put inaccurate statements at the end of popular films." She stated the film failed to meet legal standards of defamation because it failed to "show a single person who is identifiable as a DEA agent."

Many of Lucas's other claims, as presented in the film, have also been called into question, such as his being the right-hand man of Bumpy Johnson, rising above the power of the Mafia and Nicky Barnes, and being the mastermind behind the Golden Triangle heroin connection of the 1970s. Ron Chepesiuk, a Lucas biographer, said there was no evidence to confirm Lucas's claim that he once (not frequently, as some sources had suggested) used coffins to ship heroin. Associated Press entertainment writer Frank Coyle noted, "[T]his mess happened partially because journalists have been relying on secondary sources removed from the actual events."

=== The Many Saints of Newark (2021) ===
Lucas appears as a minor supporting character in the Warner Bros. Pictures/New Line Cinema/HBO Films co-production The Many Saints of Newark (2021). The film, a prequel to the HBO crime drama series The Sopranos, features Lucas (Oberon K.A. Adjepong) giving advice to up and coming mobster Harold McBrayer (Leslie Odom Jr.) while he is on the run in North Carolina, inspiring him to form his own black criminal organization once he returns to Newark.

=== Television ===
- American Gangster, season 2, episode 5, featured Lucas.
- The Gangland episode "American Gangster" (November 1, 2007) features Lucas, Nicky Barnes, and The Council drug syndicate.
- Lucas was featured in the third episode of the first season of the Netflix documentary series Drug Lords, in which he told his side of the story.
- Lucas is introduced as a character in the second episode of the fourth season of Godfather of Harlem (2025), portrayed by Rome Flynn.

== Personal life ==
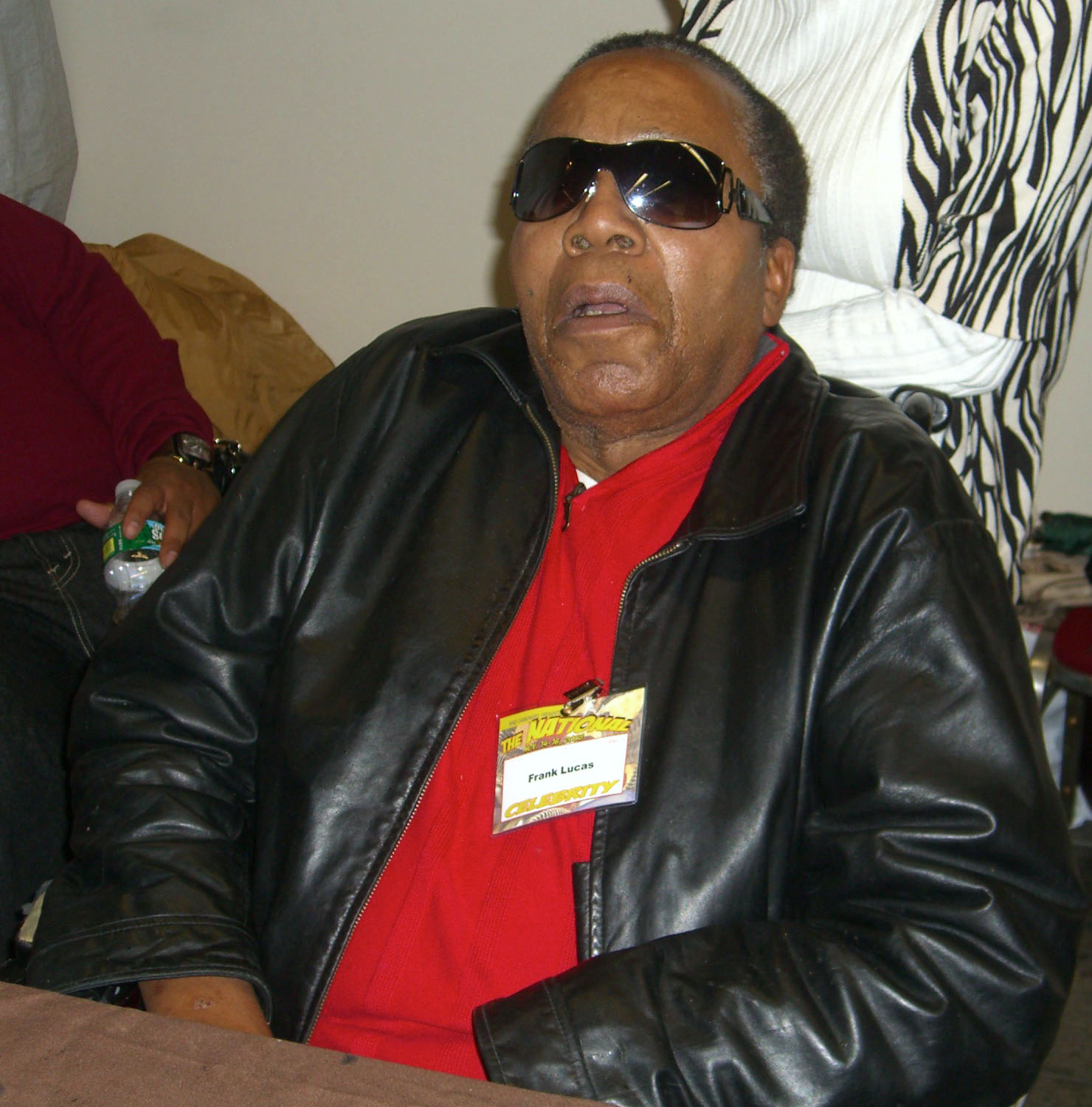
Lucas at the Big Apple Comic Con in 2008

Lucas's first marriage, to Miriam, ended abruptly. He was enraged with her, on account of her recently having had an abortion, which he felt was “flat-out wrong”. One day soon after, Lucas was headed home when he was tipped off by a handyman that Miriam was in their apartment, along with four detectives. Believing she was setting him up, he fled and didn’t see her again for another 20 years.

His second wife, Julie Farrait, was also convicted for her role in her husband's criminal enterprise and spent five years in prison. After she was released, the couple lived separately for some years, and Farrait moved back to Puerto Rico. After several years, however, they reconciled, and according to a December 2007 Village Voice article, had been married for 40 years at the time.

Lucas fathered seven children with six women.

Lucas was known to be eclectic in his religious preferences, having converted to the Catholic faith while at prison in Elmira, which he stated he did because the prison chaplain assisted inmates being released on parole. He had Baptist affiliations as well.

== Final years and death ==
In his last years, Lucas used a wheelchair due to a car accident that broke his legs.

Lucas died at the age of 88 on May 30, 2019, in Cedar Grove, New Jersey.

== See also ==
- Frank Matthews (drug trafficker)
- Louis Diaz
- List of people from Harlem
