= Judge Conger =

Judge Conger may refer to:

- Abraham Benjamin Conger (1887–1953), judge of the United States District Court for the Middle District of Georgia
- Edward Augustus Conger (1882–1963), judge of the United States District Court for the Southern District of New York
