= Collaborations between the United States government and Italian Mafia =

United States government and Italian mafia's collaborative efforts

The United States government collaborated with the Italian Mafia during World War II and afterwards on several occasions.

== Operation Underworld: Strikes and labor disputes in the eastern shipping ports ==
During the early days of World War II, the U.S. Office of Naval Intelligence suspected that Italian and German agents were entering the United States through New York, and that these facilities were susceptible to sabotage. The loss of SS Normandie in February 1942, especially, raised fears and suspicions in the Navy about possible sabotage in the Eastern ports. A Navy Intelligence Unit, B3, assigned more than a hundred agents to investigate possible Benito Mussolini supporters within the predominantly Italian-American fisherman and dockworker population on the waterfront. Their efforts were fruitless, as the dockworkers and fishermen in the Italian Mafia-controlled waterfront were tight-lipped and distant to strangers. The Navy contacted Meyer Lansky, a known associate of Salvatore C. Luciano and one of the top non-Italian associates of the Mafia, about a deal with the Mafia boss Luciano. Luciano, also known as Lucky Luciano, was one of the highest-ranking Mafia both in Italy and the US and was serving a 30 to 50 years sentence for compulsory prostitution in the Clinton Prison. To facilitate the negotiations, the State of New York moved Luciano from the Clinton prison to Great Meadow Correctional Facility, which is much closer to New York City.

The State of New York, Luciano and the Navy struck a deal in which Luciano guaranteed full assistance of his organization in providing intelligence to the Navy. In addition, Luciano associate Albert Anastasia—who controlled the docks and ran Murder, Inc.—allegedly guaranteed no dockworker strikes throughout the war. In return, the State of New York agreed to commute Luciano's sentence. Luciano's actual influence is uncertain, but the authorities did note that the dockworker strikes stopped after the deal was reached with Luciano.

In the summer of 1945, Luciano petitioned the State of New York for executive clemency, citing his assistance to the Navy. Naval authorities, embarrassed that they had to recruit organized-crime to help in their war effort, declined to confirm Luciano's claim. However, the Manhattan District Attorney's office validated the facts and the state parole board unanimously agreed to recommend to the governor that Luciano be released and deported immediately. On January 4, 1946, Governor Thomas E. Dewey, the former prosecutor who placed Luciano into prison, commuted Lucky Luciano's sentence on the condition that he did not resist deportation to Italy. Dewey stated, “Upon the entry of the United States into the war, Luciano’s aid was sought by the Armed Services in inducing others to provide information concerning possible enemy attack. It appears that he cooperated in such effort, although the actual value of the information procured is not clear.” Luciano was deported to his homeland Italy on February 9, 1946. There was a media hype of Luciano's role after his deportation. The syndicated columnist and radio broadcaster Walter Winchell even reported in 1947 that Luciano would receive the Medal of Honor for his secret services.

== Operation Husky: The invasion of Sicily and its aftermath ==
Italian Americans were very helpful in the planning and execution of the invasion of Sicily. The Mafia was involved in assisting the U.S. war efforts. Luciano's associates found numerous Sicilians to help the Naval Intelligence draw maps of the harbors of Sicily and dig up old snapshots of the coastline. Vito Genovese, another Mafia boss, offered his services to the U.S. Army and became an interpreter and advisor to the U.S. Army military government in Naples. He quickly became one of AMGOT’s most trusted employees. Through the Navy Intelligence’s Mafia contacts from Operation Underworld, the names of Sicilian underworld personalities and friendly Sicilian natives who could be trusted were obtained and actually used in the Sicilian campaign.

The Joint Staff Planners (JSP) for the US Joint Chiefs of Staff drafted a report titled Special Military Plan for Psychological Warfare in Sicily that recommended the “Establishment of contact and communications with the leaders of separatist nuclei, disaffected workers, and clandestine radical groups, e.g., the Mafia, and giving them every possible aid.” The report was approved by the Joint Chiefs of Staff in Washington on April 15, 1943.

== Assassination attempts on Fidel Castro ==
Starting in 1960, the CIA mounted a number of efforts to kill Cuban leader Fidel Castro, involving in some cases the recruitment of organized crime members to assist in executing the plots. Later, the Senate Select Committee to Study Governmental Operations, commonly known as the Church Committee, documented at least eight such plots against Castro between 1960 and 1965.

The first plan to involve organized crime went into effect in August 1960, when the CIA’s deputy director of plans Richard Bissell spoke to Colonel Sheffield Edwards, Director of the Office of Security, to determine if his office could provide assets appropriate for what was internally termed a mission requiring “gangster-type action.” The man they were after was Fidel Castro. Edwards contacted private investigator Robert Maheu, a former FBI agent working on contract, who was told to contact organized crime figure John Roselli. On September 14, 1960, Maheu formally approached Roselli at the Hilton Plaza Hotel in New York City. Roselli then introduced Maheu to two other men, whom he knew only as “Sam Gold” and “Joe.” They were Chicago Outfit boss Sam Giancana and Florida mobster Santo Trafficante Jr. Both were on the Justice Department’s most-wanted list at the time.

The method that was most pursued during the first phase of the operation was the usage of poison. Giancana suggested bringing poison that can be put into Castro’s food or drinks. The Technical Services Division of the CIA was asked to make poison pills for the mission. A Cuban official that was familiar with Castro was determined as a possible agent. However, they ended up canceling the plan due to the contact losing his nerve.

A second phase of the operation, resumed after the failed Bay of Pigs invasion of April 1961, involved CIA officer William Harvey, who was to take over handling of Roselli. Another attempt was made to introduce poison into food available to Castro at a frequented restaurant in Cuba, but this endeavor also failed to reach a target.

The full extent of these collaborations between the CIA and organized crime were not revealed to the public until the Church Committee's investigation began in 1975. Both Giancana and Roselli were called up to testify in front of the committee about these plots. Giancana was shot and killed in his home in Oak Park, Illinois in June 1975, a few days before he was supposed to testify. Roselli was asked to testify twice in 1975, but was later found dead in August 1976 his decaying corpse found in a sealed drum in a bay near Miami, after he was called back up to testify again about the Kennedy assassination. The Attorney General at the time ordered the FBI to investigate whether Roselli's testimony about the CIA's Castro plots played a role in his death.

The Church Committee determined that the CIA used known underworld informants in assassination attempts, and that assassinations were not a wise tool for the United States to use in foreign policy.

== Controversy and criticism ==
There was considerable public controversy during the late days of the war and afterwards surrounding the connection between the U.S. Government and the Mafia. In 1953, Governor Dewey, pushed by allegations that he sold Luciano his pardon, ordered a confidential investigation by the state's commissioner of investigation, William Herlands.Herlands made public his 2,600-page report in 1954, providing evidence for Luciano's dealings with the Navy but without any wrong doing on Dewey's part. Naval officials reviewed the report and requested Dewey to not release it on the grounds that it would be a public-relations disaster for the Navy and it might damage future similar war efforts. Dewey agreed, and the report was not released until after his death in the mid-1970s.

Notable scholars of the topic such as Selwyn Raab and Tim Newark have questioned the effectiveness of the Mafia in their help during Operation Husky. Raab states that Luciano could not have helped during the invasion of Sicily, as he was out of touch with the Sicilian Mafia, and neither he nor the Cosa Nostra had any significant contribution to the Allied victory in Sicily. On the other hand, another scholar on the topic, Ezio Costanzo, alleges that Congressman Horan revealed that Luciano was visited 11 times by Naval Intelligence officers throughout his sentence. In addition, Costanzo states that Commander Haffenden of Naval Intelligence Section F (foreign intelligence) stated in numerous reports how his men were interviewing many native-born Italians and that they were cooperating because of Luciano.

== See also ==
- Collaboration between Israel and anti-Hamas militants
