= Thomas J. Bartosiewicz =

American politician (1948–2005)

Member of the New York State Senate
- In office February 10, 1976 – December 31, 1988
- Preceded by: Chester J. Straub
- Succeeded by: Ada L. Smith
- Constituency: 18th district (1976-1982); 20th district (1983-1988)

Personal details
- Born: May 27, 1948 Brooklyn, New York, U.S.
- Died: November 23, 2005 (aged 57)
- Party: Democratic

Thomas J. Bartosiewicz (May 27, 1948 – November 23, 2005) was an American politician from New York.

== Life ==
Bartosiewicz was born on May 27, 1948, in Brooklyn, New York City and died November 23, 2005. He attended St. Stanislaus Kostka Elementary School and St. Francis Prep in Brooklyn. He graduated from Dartmouth College in 1969. In 1971, he received a scholarship from the Kosciuszko Foundation to study at the Jagiellonian University in Kraków, Poland.

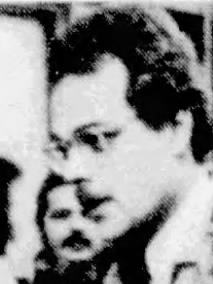
Bartosiewicz in 1977

He entered politics as a Democrat. On February 10, 1976, he was elected to the New York State Senate, to fill the vacancy caused by the resignation of Chester J. Straub. Bartosiewicz was re-elected several times, and remained in the Senate until 1988, sitting in the 181st, 182nd, 183rd, 184th, 185th, 186th and 187th New York State Legislatures. In June 1988, he announced that he would not seek re-election later that year, but pursue his interest in minor league baseball instead.

New York State Senate
Preceded by Chester J. Straub	New York State Senate; 18th District; 1976–1982	Succeeded by Donald Halperin
Preceded by Donald Halperin	New York State Senate; 20th District; 1983–1988	Succeeded by Ada Smith
