= Shirley Wohl Kram =

American judge

Senior Judge of the United States District Court for the Southern District of New York
- In office May 23, 1993 – August 21, 2009

Judge of the United States District Court for the Southern District of New York
- In office March 2, 1983 – May 23, 1993
- Appointed by: Ronald Reagan
- Preceded by: Lawrence W. Pierce
- Succeeded by: John G. Koeltl

Personal details
- Born: December 25, 1922 New York City, New York, U.S.
- Died: August 21, 2009 (aged 86)
- Education: Brooklyn Law School (LLB)

Shirley Wohl Kram (December 25, 1922 – August 21, 2009) was a United States district judge of the United States District Court for the Southern District of New York.

== Education and career ==
Born in New York City, New York, Kram received a Bachelor of Laws from Brooklyn Law School in 1950. She was an attorney with the Legal Aid Society of New York City from 1951 to 1953, and was in private practice of law in New York City from 1954 to 1960. She was an assistant attorney in charge of the Harlem Office of the Legal Aid Society of New York from 1962 to 1971, and was chief of the Narcotics and Mental Health Division throughout that time. She was a judge of the New York City Family Court in Manhattan from 1971 to 1983.

== Federal judicial service ==
On January 31, 1983, Kram was nominated by President Ronald Reagan to a seat on the United States District Court for the Southern District of New York vacated by Judge Lawrence W. Pierce. She was confirmed by the United States Senate on March 2, 1983, and received her commission the same day. She assumed senior status on May 23, 1993, and served in that capacity until her death in 2009.

== Sources ==
Legal offices
Preceded by Lawrence W. Pierce	Judge of the United States District Court for the Southern District of New York; 1983–1993	Succeeded by John G. Koeltl
