= Sandra L. Townes =

American judge (1944–2018)

Sandra Lynn Townes
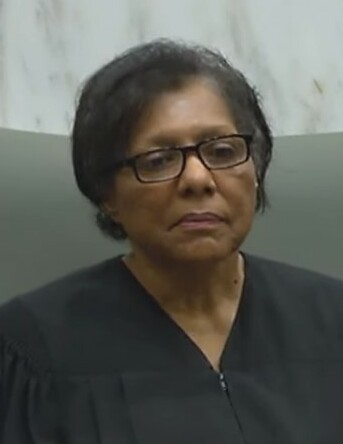
- Townes in 2017

Senior Judge of the United States District Court for the Eastern District of New York
- In office May 1, 2015 – February 8, 2018

Judge of the United States District Court for the Eastern District of New York
- In office August 2, 2004 – May 1, 2015
- Appointed by: George W. Bush
- Preceded by: Sterling Johnson Jr.
- Succeeded by: Ann Donnelly

Personal details
- Born: September 29, 1944 Spartanburg, South Carolina
- Died: February 8, 2018 (aged 73) Manhattan, New York
- Education: Johnson C. Smith University (BA); Syracuse University College of Law (JD)

Sandra Lynn Townes (September 29, 1944 – February 8, 2018) was a United States district judge of the United States District Court for the Eastern District of New York.

== Early life and education ==
Born in Spartanburg, South Carolina, the Honorable Sandra L. Townes graduated from Johnson C. Smith University with her Bachelor of Arts degree in 1966 and later from Syracuse University College of Law with a Juris Doctor in 1976.

== Legal career ==
Following law school graduation, Townes worked with the Onondaga County, New York, District Attorney's Office as Assistant District Attorney (1977–83).

She was promoted to Senior Assistant District Attorney (1983–86) and became Chief Assistant District Attorney (1986–87). Townes was elected to a City Court Judge seat for the City Court of Syracuse, New York (1988–99). In 1999, Townes was elected as Justice of the Fifth Judicial District New York Supreme Court (2000–04).

She was selected by the New York State Governor, George Pataki, to the judicial post of Appellate Division Associate justice handling appeals for the 2nd Judicial Department of the New York State Supreme Court (2001–04). During this time, Townes was an Adjunct professor at Syracuse University College of Law (1987–95) and at Onondaga Community College (1992 to 2001).

== Federal judicial service ==
Townes was nominated to the United States District Court for the Eastern District of New York by President George W. Bush on August 1, 2003 to a seat vacated when the Honorable Sterling Johnson Jr. assumed senior status. Townes was confirmed by the Senate on June 3, 2004 on a Senate vote and received her commission on August 2, 2004. She assumed senior status on May 1, 2015, serving in that status until her death of lung cancer at the Memorial Sloan Kettering Cancer Center in Manhattan, New York on February 8, 2018.

== See also ==
- List of African-American federal judges
- List of African-American jurists

== Sources ==
- Sandra L. Townes - Historical Society of the New York Courts (nycourts.gov)

Legal offices
Preceded by Sterling Johnson Jr.	Judge of the United States District Court for the Eastern District of New York; 2004–2015	Succeeded by Ann Donnelly
