= Ann Donnelly =

American judge (born 1959)

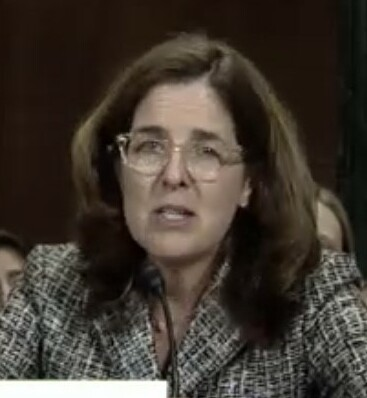

Judge of the United States District Court for the Eastern District of New York
- Incumbent
- Assumed office October 21, 2015
- Appointed by: Barack Obama
- Preceded by: Sandra L. Townes

Personal details
- Born: 1959 (age 66–67) Royal Oak, Michigan, U.S.
- Education: University of Michigan (BA); Ohio State University (JD)

Ann Marie Donnelly (born 1959) is a United States district judge of the United States District Court for the Eastern District of New York.

== Education ==
Donnelly received a Bachelor of Arts degree in 1981 from the University of Michigan and a Juris Doctor in 1984 from the Ohio State University Moritz College of Law.

== Career ==
From 1984 to 2009, she was a prosecutor in the New York County District Attorney's office. From 1997 to 2005, she served as senior trial counsel and from 2005 to 2009, she served as chief of the Family Violence and Child Abuse Bureau.

As an assistant district attorney, Donnelly successfully prosecuted former Tyco International CEO L. Dennis Kozlowski for securities fraud and grand larceny, among other crimes. Kozlowski served 8 1/2 years for his crimes. Donnelly was also part of the prosecution team in the murder trial of Sante Kimes and her son, Kenneth Kimes.

=== State judicial service ===
From 2009 to 2015, she served as a judge of the New York Court of Claims. Concurrently, she served at various points on the New York Supreme Court (the state trial court) in Bronx County, Kings County (Brooklyn), and New York County (Manhattan), as well as on a special term for election matters.

As a state court judge, Donnelly presided over the trial of Adam Tang, a day trader convicted of reckless endangerment and reckless driving for his illegal high-speed street racing around Manhattan (circling the island in 24 minutes) and posting videos of the stunt on YouTube. After Tang fled the country during his trial, Donnelly issued a warrant for his arrest and sentenced him in absentia to a year in jail.

=== Federal judicial service ===
On November 20, 2014, President Barack Obama nominated Donnelly to serve as a United States district judge of the United States District Court for the Eastern District of New York, to the seat vacated by Judge Sandra L. Townes, who assumed senior status on May 1, 2015. Senator Charles Schumer recommended Donnelly for the position.

On December 16, 2014, her nomination was returned to the President due to the sine die adjournment of the 113th Congress. On January 7, 2015, President Obama renominated her to the same position. She received a hearing before the United States Senate Judiciary Committee on May 6, 2015. On June 4, 2015, her nomination was reported out of committee by a voice vote. On October 20, 2015, the Senate confirmed her nomination by a 95–2 vote. She received her judicial commission on October 21, 2015. An investiture ceremony was held on January 22, 2016.

==== Notable cases ====
On January 28, 2017, Donnelly issued an emergency stay blocking part of an executive order issued by President Donald Trump from going into effect. The ruling enjoined the federal government from deporting individuals who had arrived in the country with valid visas or refugee status. Several minutes after Donnelly entered her order, another judge, Leonie Brinkema of the United States District Court for the Eastern District of Virginia, issued a temporary restraining order blocking the Trump administration from preventing the return of lawful permanent residents at Dulles International Airport.

She also tried the singer R. Kelly in his sex trafficking trial, where he was convicted of all charges. On June 29, 2022, Donnelly sentenced Kelly to 30 years in prison.

In June 2022, The United States Supreme Court unanimously vacated Judge Donnelly's decision that a minor child be compelled to return to Italy despite the child "facing a grave risk of harm" if returned. The Supreme Court returned the matter to Judge Donnelly, who again ordered the child returned to Italy, in August 2022. The child's mother, Narkis Aliza Golan, who had settled at a New York domestic violence shelter after fleeing Italy to protect the child, was found dead weeks after Judge Donnelly's August 2022 decision. At the time of her death, Golan was preparing to appeal Donnelly's August 2022 decision.

Legal offices
Preceded by Sandra L. Townes	Judge of the United States District Court for the Eastern District of New York; 2015–present	Incumbent
