= John G. Koeltl =

American judge (born 1945)

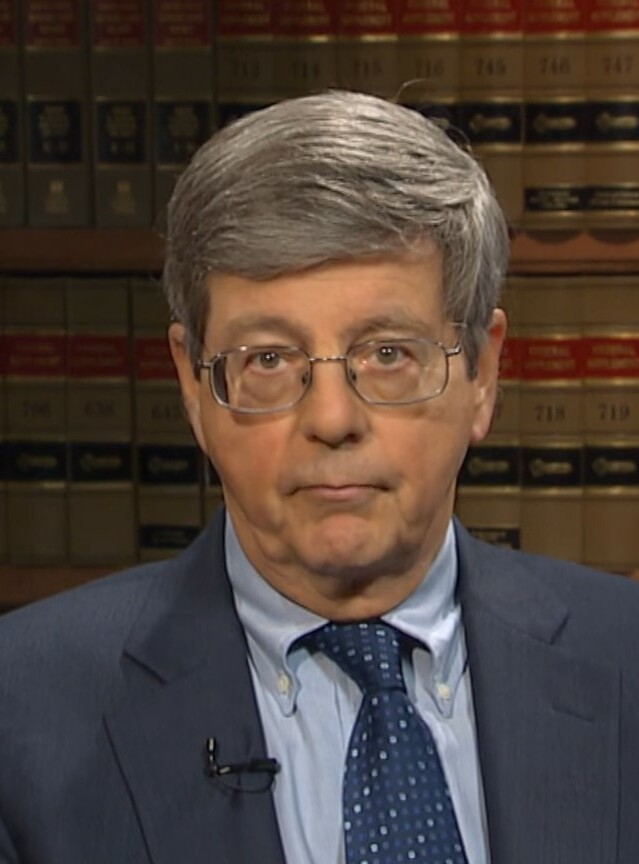
- Koeltl in 2015

Judge of the United States District Court for the Southern District of New York
- Incumbent
- Assumed office August 10, 1994
- Appointed by: Bill Clinton
- Preceded by: Shirley Wohl Kram

Personal details
- Born: 1945 (age 80–81) New York City, New York, U.S.
- Education: Georgetown University (BA); Harvard University (JD)

John George Koeltl (/ˈkoʊltəl/; born 1945) is a United States district judge of the United States District Court for the Southern District of New York in Manhattan.

== Early life and education ==
Koeltl was born in New York City. He graduated from Regis High School in New York City in 1963. He studied history at Georgetown University, receiving a Bachelor of Arts degree in 1967. In 1971 he obtained his Juris Doctor from Harvard Law School, where he was an editor of the Harvard Law Review. He served as a law clerk for Judge Edward Weinfeld of the Southern District of New York and then for Justice Potter Stewart of the United States Supreme Court.

== Career ==
From 1973 to 1974, Koeltl served as an assistant special prosecutor for the Watergate Special Prosecution Force, then entered private law practice in New York. For several years, Koeltl was a partner at the New York law firm of Debevoise & Plimpton. During these years, Koeltl served on several committees of the Association of the Bar of the City of New York and American Bar Association and was the author of several published articles on securities law and other topics.

=== Federal judicial service ===
Koeltl was nominated by President Bill Clinton on April 26, 1994, to a seat vacated by Judge Shirley Wohl Kram. He was confirmed by the Senate on August 9, 1994, and received his commission on August 10, 1994.

=== Notable decisions ===
Koeltl is known for his October 2006 decision to sentence civil rights lawyer Lynne Stewart to 28 months in prison for providing material assistance to a terrorist, her client, 1993 World Trade Center bombing mastermind Omar Abdel-Rahman, by secretly passing messages to his radical followers in Egypt. Koeltl rejected the prosecutors' recommendation of 30 years. The Second Circuit Court of Appeals ordered Koeltl to reconsider whether that sentence was too light and to take into account the government's arguments that she had committed perjury at her trial and abused her position as a lawyer. On remand, Koeltl cited remarks Stewart had made after being sentenced that indicated a lack of remorse. He changed the sentence to 10 years in prison.

In 2011, he presided over the case involving Raffaello Follieri, who pleaded guilty to conspiracy, fraud and money laundering in connection with purchases of property from the Catholic Church. The Follieri case received significant media scrutiny due to his relationship with celebrities, notably Anne Hathaway and several politicians, including former president Bill Clinton and 2008 Republican presidential nominee John McCain. Koeltl also presided over a case brought by Citigroup against Wells Fargo to halt the latter's purchase of Wachovia, which Citi had earlier announced plans to purchase. The litigation settled in 2010.

A U.S. appeals court, in an opinion written by Koeltl, tossed out a $654 million jury verdict against the Palestine Liberation Organization for terrorist attacks in the early 2000s in Israel that killed or wounded Americans, saying the U.S. courts lack jurisdiction because the attacks were random and not aimed at the United States.

In April 2018 Koeltl was assigned to preside over a civil lawsuit filed by the Democratic National Committee against the Russian Federation, WikiLeaks, the Donald Trump presidential campaign, and several individuals. The suit alleges that Russian interference in the 2016 United States elections harmed Democrats. Koeltl, in dismissing the suit in July 2019, described WikiLeaks' publishing activities as "plainly of the type entitled to the strongest protection that the First Amendment offers."

In September 2020 Koeltl presided over Sam Party v. Kosinski in which the Serve America Party sued Todd D. Valentine and Robert A. Brehm, the Co-Execute Directors of the New York State Board of Elections, and Peter S. Kosinski, Douglas A. Kellner, and Andrew J. Spano, the Commissioners of the New York State Board of Elections (NYSBOE). The Serve America Movement (SAM) was added to Qualified New York political parties after it attained the required number of votes in the 2018 election for Governor of New York. NYSBOE changed New York State Election Law after the election, to increase the minimum requirement from 50,000 votes to 2% or about 130,000 votes. SAM alleged that the rule change violated the First Amendment rights to freedom of speech and association, and the equal protection and due process protections of the Fourteenth Amendment of the SAM Party and its supporters.

In May 2021 Koeltl presided over Libertarian Party of N.Y. v. N.Y. Bd. of Elections in which the Libertarian Party of New York and the Green Party of New York sued the New York State Board of Elections, its chairs, commissioners, and executive directors. The Libertarian Party and Green Party were added to Qualified New York political parties after they attained the required number of votes in the 2018 election for Governor of New York. After the NYSBOE rule change, the plaintiffs alleged that the amendments to the New York Election Law found in Sections 9 and 10 of Part ZZZ of the 2020-2021 Fiscal Year New York State Budget Bill ("Part ZZZ"), violated the First and Fourteenth Amendment rights of both parties. District Judge John G. Koeltl denied the request.

In the case Hachette v. Internet Archive, Koeltl made a summary judgement in favor of major book publishers, who sued the Internet Archive for providing an emergency digital library during the COVID-19 pandemic. He ruled on March 24, 2023, that Controlled digital lending (CDL) violates copyright and that it was not protected as a form of fair use. The Internet Archive will appeal to a higher court.

== Personal life ==
Koeltl's niece Susan is married to Steven Engel. Koeltl performed their wedding ceremony.

== See also ==
- List of law clerks for the eighth seat of the Supreme Court of the United States

== Sources ==
- Individual Practices of Judge Koeltl from the US District Court for the Southern District of New York.

Legal offices
Preceded by Shirley Wohl Kram	Judge of the United States District Court for the Southern District of New York; 1994–present	Incumbent
