= United States v. Thomas (1997) =

American legal case

- Court: United States Court of Appeals for the Second Circuit
- Full case name: United States v. Grady Thomas
- Argued: November 14, 1996
- Decided: May 20, 1997
- Citations: 116 F.3d 606; 65 USLW 2788

Court membership
- Judges sitting: Joseph Edward Lumbard, Joseph M. McLaughlin, José A. Cabranes

Case opinions
- Majority: Cabranes, joined by a unanimous court

United States v. Thomas, 116 F.3d 606 (2nd Cir. 1997), was a case in which the U.S. Court of Appeals for the Second Circuit ruled that a juror could not be removed from a jury on the ground that the juror was acting in purposeful disregard of the court's instructions on the law, when the record evidence raises a possibility that the juror was simply unpersuaded by the Government's case against the defendants. The case had important implications for when secrecy of the jury deliberation process outweighs the ability to dismiss a juror for nullification.

== Facts ==
During jury selection for a drug distribution trial, the prosecutor attempted to use a peremptory strike on a black man, empaneled as "Juror No. 5." Because Juror No. 5 was the only black person left in the jury, the defense counsel objected to the strike under Batson v. Kentucky. The court found that the strike was not racially motivated—the prosecutor's stated reason was that the juror failed to make eye contact—but improperly denied the challenge anyway.

Following six weeks of trial, half of the jurors approached a courtroom clerk and expressed concerns about Juror No. 5. The jurors "complained that Juror No. 5 was distracting them in court by squeaking his shoe against the floor, rustling cough drop wrappers in his pocket, and showing agreement with points made by defense counsel".

Defense counsel opposed the judges suggestions that he either interview each juror to determine the extent of Juror No. 5's disruptions or to dismiss the juror pursuant to Federal Rule of Criminal Procedure 24(c). Ultimately, the judge interviewed the jurors separately and decided to retain Juror No. 5 after further objections from the defense counsel.

The next week several jurors complained about Juror No. 5's behavior again. In particular, at least five jurors claimed that Juror No. 5 was not attempting to decide the case on its merits—however several others stated that Juror No. 5 "couched" his decision to vote not guilty upon the evidence at trial. When interviewed by the court, Juror No. 5 said nothing "to suggest that he was not making a good faith effort to apply the law as instructed to the facts of the case." Ultimately, the court dismissed Juror No. 5 for his cantankerous conduct but also his perceived refusal to convict because of "preconceived ... reasons that are totally improper and impermissible." Subsequently, the defendants were found guilty and they appealed the decision, challenging the dismissal of Juror No. 5.

== Holding ==
The U.S. Court of Appeals for the Second Circuit held that:

1. A juror who nullifies evidence may be dismissed for "just cause" under Rule 23(b) of the Federal Rules of Criminal Procedure.
2. Dismissal can be granted only when there is proof beyond all doubt that a juror had nullified the trial evidence.
