= Chester J. Straub =

American judge (1937–2024)

Chester John Straub

Senior Judge of the United States Court of Appeals for the Second Circuit
- In office July 16, 2008 – July 13, 2024

Judge of the United States Court of Appeals for the Second Circuit
- In office June 3, 1998 – July 16, 2008
- Appointed by: Bill Clinton
- Preceded by: Joseph M. McLaughlin
- Succeeded by: Gerard E. Lynch

Member of the New York Senate
- In office January 1, 1973 – December 31, 1975
- Preceded by: Edward Lentol (redistricting)
- Succeeded by: Thomas J. Bartosiewicz
- Constituency: 17th district (1973–74); 18th district (1975)

Member of the New York State Assembly from the 35th district
- In office January 1, 1967 – December 31, 1972
- Preceded by: Sidney Lebowitz
- Succeeded by: John Lopresto

Personal details
- Born: Chester John Straub; May 12, 1937 New York City, U.S.
- Died: July 13, 2024 (aged 87) Bronxville, New York, U.S.
- Party: Democratic
- Education: Saint Peter's University (BA); University of Virginia (LLB)

Chester John Straub (May 12, 1937 – July 13, 2024) was a United States circuit judge of the United States Court of Appeals for the Second Circuit.

== Education and career ==
Straub was born on May 12, 1937, in Brooklyn, New York City, New York. He received a Bachelor of Arts degree from St. Peter's College in 1958, and his Bachelor of Laws from the University of Virginia School of Law in 1961. Straub served as a First Lieutenant in United States Army Intelligence and Security from 1961 to 1963. In 1963, he began the private practice of law with Willkie Farr & Gallagher, where he became a partner in 1971, and where he remained until his appointment to the federal bench. Straub's private practice was concentrated in litigation, regulatory agencies and governmental affairs.

=== State legislative service ===
Straub was a member of the New York State Assembly from 1967 to 1972, sitting in the 177th, 178th and 179th New York State Legislatures. In 1972, when Senator Edward S. Lentol was nominated for State Supreme Court, Kings County Democrats selected Straub to replace him as the nominee. He won, and served in the New York State Senate from 1973 to 1975, sitting in the 180th and 181st New York State Legislatures.

=== Federal judicial service ===
Straub was nominated by President Bill Clinton on February 11, 1998, to a seat on the United States Court of Appeals for the Second Circuit vacated by Judge Joseph M. McLaughlin. He was confirmed by the United States Senate on June 1, 1998, and received commission on June 3, 1998. He assumed senior status on July 16, 2008.

==== Notable cases ====
In January 2006, Straub was one of the three judges selected to hear National Abortion Federation v. Gonzales, 437 F.3d 278, one of the cases later folded into and resolved by Gonzales v. Carhart. The Second Circuit thereby became one of three circuits to uphold district court rulings against the constitutionality of the Partial-Birth Abortion Ban Act of 2003. Out of the nine circuit court judges who ruled on this issue, Straub was the only one to dissent, voting to reverse the district court and uphold the Act.

In the 2006 case of MacWade v. Kelly, Straub wrote for a unanimous three-judge panel of the Second Circuit that warrantless, suspicionless police searches of New York City Subway riders in response to terrorism were justified by the "special needs doctrine" and so did not violate the Fourth Amendment to the United States Constitution.

In 2012, Straub dissented in Windsor v. United States, a case in which the United States Court of Appeals for the Second Circuit held in an opinion written by prominent conservative Chief Judge Dennis Jacobs, that Section 3 of the Defense of Marriage Act (DOMA) is unconstitutional. Of the six circuit judges to rule on challenges to DOMA Section 3 brought by married same-sex couples, Straub was the only judge to find the law constitutional. He wrote that DOMA could easily be justified by Congress' "common sense." Straub also stated that DOMA was constitutional because "the state is . . . interested in preventing 'irresponsible procreation,' a phenomenon implicated exclusively by heterosexuals," and that "reserving federal marriage rights to opposite-sex couples 'protect[s] civil society.'" Straub went on to say that courts have no role in protecting minorities' civil rights "where there is a robust political debate because doing so poisons the political well, imposing a destructive anti-majoritarian constitutional ruling on a vigorous debate." On June 26, 2013, the United States Supreme Court affirmed that DOMA Section 3 was unconstitutional because there was "strong evidence" that the "essence" of the law was "'a bare congressional desire to harm a politically unpopular group.'"

== Personal life and death ==
Straub died in Bronxville, New York on July 13, 2024, at the age of 87.

New York State Assembly
Preceded by Sidney Lebowitz	Member of the New York Assembly from the 35th district 1967–1972	Succeeded by John Lopresto
New York State Senate
Preceded by Jeremiah B. Bloom	Member of the New York Senate from the 17th district 1973–1974	Succeeded by Major Owens
Preceded by Vander L. Beatty	Member of the New York Senate from the 18th district 1975	Succeeded by Thomas J. Bartosiewicz
Legal offices
Preceded by Joseph M. McLaughlin	Judge of the United States Court of Appeals for the Second Circuit; 1998–2008	Succeeded by Gerard E. Lynch
