= Donald Halperin =

American lawyer and politician

Member of the New York State Senate
- In office January 6, 1971 – October 4, 1993
- Preceded by: William Rosenblatt
- Succeeded by: Carl Kruger
- Constituency: 16th district (1971-1972); 20th district (1973-1982); 18th district (1983-1992); 21st district (1993)

Personal details
- Born: July 25, 1945 Brooklyn, New York, US
- Died: June 25, 2006 (aged 60) Brooklyn, New York, US
- Party: Democratic

Donald Marc Halperin (July 25, 1945 – June 26, 2006) was an American lawyer and politician from New York.

== Early life ==
He was born on July 25, 1945, the son of Charles Halperin and Gladys Halperin. He attended Abraham Lincoln High School. He graduated from Rutgers University in 1967, and from Brooklyn Law School in 1970. He married Brenda, and they had two children. While still in law school, he entered politics as a Democrat.

== Career ==
Halperin was a member of the New York State Senate from 1971 to 1993, sitting in the 179th, 180th, 181st, 182nd, 183rd, 184th, 185th, 186th, 187th, 188th, 189th and 190th New York State Legislatures. In September 1993, he ran in the Democratic primary for New York City Public Advocate, but came in fifth among six candidates. On October 4, 1993, Halperin was appointed as New York State Commissioner of the Division of Housing and Community Renewal. He remained in office until the end of 1994. Afterwards Halperin practiced law in New York City.

He was among those who, outnumbered 35 Republicans to 26 Democratic state senators, used a 23 day slowdown until concessions were made by the majority. This was not the only time Halperin was involved in influencing outcomes. In 1971 the New York Civil Liberties Union ranked him the third most liberal member of the legislature's upper house.

== Death ==
He died on June 26, 2006, in the Menorah Nursing Home in Manhattan Beach, Brooklyn, of lung cancer, and was buried at the Mount Lebanon Cemetery in Glendale, Queens. He was Jewish.

New York State Senate
Preceded by William Rosenblatt	New York State Senate; 16th District; 1971–1972	Succeeded by A. Frederick Meyerson
Preceded by Albert B. Lewis	New York State Senate; 20th District; 1973–1982	Succeeded by Thomas J. Bartosiewicz
Preceded by Thomas J. Bartosiewicz	New York State Senate; 18th District; 1983–1992	Succeeded by Velmanette Montgomery
Preceded by Marty Markowitz	New York State Senate; 21st District; 1993	Succeeded by Carl Kruger
