= Democratic National Committee v. Russian Federation =

Civil lawsuit filed by the Democratic National Committee (DNC)

- Court: United States District Court for the Southern District of New York
- Full case name: Democratic National Committee, Plaintiff, v. The Russian Federation; General Staff of the Armed Forces of the Russian Federation ("GRU"); GRU operative using the pseudonym "Guccifer 2.0"; Aras Iskenerovich Agalarov, Emin Araz Agalarov, Joseph Mifsud, WikiLeaks; Julian Assange; Donald J. Trump for President, Inc.; Donald J. Trump, Jr.; Paul J. Manafort, Jr.; Roger J. Stone, Jr.; Jared C. Kushner; George Papadopoulos; Richard W. Gates, III; John Does 1-10, Defendants
- Decided: July 30, 2019
- Docket nos.: 1:18-cv-03501

Court membership
- Judge sitting: John G. Koeltl

Democratic National Committee v. Russian Federation, et al. was a civil lawsuit filed by the Democratic National Committee (DNC) in the United States District Court for the Southern District of New York against the Russian Federation, WikiLeaks and other entities and individuals. The case, relating to Russian interference in the 2016 United States elections, was filed on April 20, 2018. The DNC's complaint accused the Trump campaign of engaging in a racketeering enterprise in conjunction with Russia and WikiLeaks. The American Civil Liberties Union, Reporters Committee for Freedom of the Press and others filed friend-of-the-court briefs expressing concern over the lawsuit's implications for freedom of the press.

Judge John G. Koeltl presided over the case, prior to dismissing it with prejudice on July 30, 2019. In dismissing the case, Judge Koeltl wrote that holding WikiLeaks liable for the publication of DNC emails would endanger press freedom, and that the Russian Federation enjoys state immunity.

== Defendants ==
Named as defendants in the lawsuit are the Russian Federation; the General Staff of the Armed Forces of the Russian Federation (GRU); the GRU operative using the pseudonym "Guccifer 2.0"; Aras Iskenerovich Agalarov; Emin Araz Agalarov; Joseph Mifsud; WikiLeaks; Julian Assange; the Trump campaign (formally "Donald J. Trump for President, Inc."); Donald Trump Jr.; Paul Manafort; Roger Stone; Jared Kushner; George Papadopoulos; Richard W. Gates; and unnamed defendants sued as John Does 1–10. The U.S. government has concluded that the GRU, the Russian military intelligence service, was responsible for hacking into the DNC's servers in 2016 and leaking emails to WikiLeaks, which published them.

== Motions ==
On September 13, 2018, a pre-motion conference was held.

On October 3, the DNC filed an amended complaint.

On December 6–7, defendants Rick Gates, George Papadopoulos, Aras and Emin Agalarov, Jared Kushner, Roger Stone, and the Trump campaign, all filed motions to dismiss the amended complaint, arguing inter alia that the plaintiff did not allege that they participated in the hacking or dissemination of the stolen information.

On December 7, WikiLeaks also filed a motion to dismiss the case on other grounds, notably the First Amendment and lack of jurisdiction.

On January 18, 2019, the complaint was further amended.

On March 4, 2019, defendants again moved to dismiss. Attorneys for WikiLeaks also filed a motion to dismiss the second amended complaint on that day.

On April 18, 2019, plaintiff formally opposed those motions.

== Dismissal ==
The suit was dismissed with prejudice on July 30, 2019, meaning it had a substantive legal defect and could not be refiled. In his judgement, Judge John Koeltl wrote that even if the Russian government were involved in the hacking, US federal law generally prohibits suits against foreign governments. As for the various other defendants, the judge wrote that they "did not participate in any wrongdoing in obtaining the materials in the first place" and therefore had the First Amendment right to publish the information. Koeltl denied the Trump campaign defendants' motion for sanctions.

== Commentary ==
The DNC did not reveal how much the lawsuit would cost.

The Washington Post compared the suit to the DNC's 1972 suit against Richard Nixon's Committee to Re-elect the President in connection with the Watergate scandal; that suit was settled in 1974 on the day Nixon resigned from office.

The suit did not name Donald Trump as a defendant. The group of defendants named in the DNC lawsuit included some people who were investigated by Special Counsel Robert Mueller. Rick Gates pleaded guilty to conspiracy and lying to the FBI in February 2018 and cooperated in the investigation, while Paul Manafort was charged with money laundering, fraud and tax evasion and pleaded not guilty. Aras and Emin Agalarov, who were also named as defendants in the lawsuit, are a father-and-son pair of Russian businessmen who hosted Trump's Miss Universe 2013 Pageant in Moscow and who were involved in planning a June 9, 2016, meeting at Trump Tower between Donald Trump Jr. and a Russian lawyer "at which Donald Trump Jr. had expected to be given damaging information" about Democratic presidential nominee Hillary Clinton.

In a tweet following the decision, Trump Sr. called it "vindication & exoneration from the Russian, WikiLeaks and every other form of HOAX perpetrated by the DNC, Radical Democrats and others."

== See also ==
- List of lawsuits involving Donald Trump
