= Ike Atkinson =

American drug trafficker (1925–2014)

- Born: November 19, 1925; Goldsboro, North Carolina, U.S.
- Died: November 11, 2014 (aged 88); Goldsboro, North Carolina, U.S.
- Other names: Ike; Sergeant Smack
- Occupation: Former drug smuggler
- Criminal charge: Drug trafficking
- Military career
- Allegiance: United States
- Branch: US Army
- Service years: 1942–1962
- Rank: Master Sergeant
- Units: 82nd Airborne Division, XVIII Airborne Corps
- Conflicts: World War II; Korean War

Leslie "Ike" Atkinson (November 19, 1925 – November 11, 2014) was a US Army master sergeant and convicted drug trafficker. He is believed to have been a major figure in smuggling heroin into the United States from Southeast Asia from about 1968 to 1975.

== Criminal career ==
Atkinson's downfall came in 1975. He made arrangements to ship packages containing heroin to two separate addresses in Fayetteville, North Carolina, each belonging to elderly black women whose names were obtained from personnel records. A serviceman on Atkinson's payroll would come to collect the packages, claiming that they had been misaddressed. During one shipment, the pickup was late; one of the women contacted the postal service while the other called the police to report a bomb threat. The police identified Atkinson from a palm print on one of the heroin bags, and he was arrested on January 19, 1975, in his home in Goldsboro while on leave. He was convicted the following year and received a prison sentence of 31 years. Atkinson was released in 2007.

== Cadaver Connection ==
The "Cadaver Connection" was a supposed heroin smuggling operation involving the use of coffins containing dead U.S. soldiers being shipped home for burial to move heroin into the United States for processing. Frank Lucas, one of Atkinson's partners in the US, stated that this was how the narcotic was smuggled out of Thailand:

Ike flew a country-boy North Carolina carpenter over to Bangkok. We had him make up 28 copies of the government coffins ... except we fixed them up with false bottoms, big enough to load up with six, maybe eight kilos ... It had to be snug. You couldn't have shit sliding around. Ike was very smart, because he made sure we used heavy guys' coffins. He didn't put them in no skinny guy's ...

— Frank Lucas

Atkinson disputed Lucas' claims, stating "It is a total lie that's fueled by Frank Lucas for personal gain. I never had anything to do with transporting heroin in coffins or cadavers."

He (Leon) never had any association with constructing coffins for transporting heroin or drugs ... [O]n the contrary, Leon was in Bangkok hollowing out teak furniture ... One time, when I was in Bangkok, Frank came to visit. We used teak furniture to smuggle the heroin and we were getting a shipment ready. Frank barged in and went right to the back. "What are you doing?" Frank asked me. I was caught off guard, and didn't want him to know how I was moving drugs. The only thing I could think of to say was: "We are making coffins."

— Ike Atkinson

== Prison and release ==
While serving his sentence, Atkinson was charged with additional counts of drug trafficking for organizing the sale of heroin through his old contacts. He was charged following a 15-month investigation where an undercover agent, posing as a corrupt German diplomat, obtained five pounds of heroin from buyers in Thailand by claiming that he was associated with Atkinson. Six other inmates were also charged, as was corrections officer Samuel Arrante, 36, for smuggling incriminating letters used to communicate information about potential deals. Also charged was Atkinson's nephew, Philip Wade Atkinson, 40, who bought the heroin on his uncle's behalf from the undercover agent at the Waldorf-Astoria Hotel, where he was arrested. Atkinson was released from prison in 2007, and died in November 2014 at the age of 88.

== In popular culture ==
- The concept of smuggling drugs from Vietnam via dead soldiers is referenced in Tom Clancy's book Without Remorse.
- A similar plot was used in "Back in the World", the December 6, 1985, episode of the American TV series Miami Vice, in which Vietnam War correspondent Ira Stone (Bob Balaban), who is investigating a series of drug-related deaths involving methanol, the byproduct of a decomposing drug stash that had been brought back to Miami a decade earlier in the bodies of dead soldiers.
- In American Gangster, Leslie’s character is portrayed as a cousin (by marriage) of Frank Lucas that is stationed with the US Army in Bangkok during the Vietnam War.
