= William Bernard Herlands =

American judge

Judge of the United States District Court for the Southern District of New York
- In office August 12, 1955 – August 28, 1969
- Appointed by: Dwight D. Eisenhower
- Preceded by: Edward Augustus Conger
- Succeeded by: Lawrence W. Pierce

Personal details
- Born: William Bernard Herlands; July 19, 1905 New York City, New York
- Died: August 28, 1969 (aged 64) New York City, New York
- Spouse: Gertrude Bendheim
- Education: City College of New York (B.S.); Columbia Law School (LL.B.)

William Bernard Herlands (July 19, 1905 – August 28, 1969) was a United States district judge of the United States District Court for the Southern District of New York.

== Education and career ==
Born in New York City, New York, Herlands received a Bachelor of Science degree from City College of New York in 1925 and a Bachelor of Laws from Columbia Law School in 1928. He was in private practice in New York City from 1928 to 1931. He was an Assistant United States Attorney of the Southern District of New York from 1931 to 1934, and was an assistant corporate counsel for New York City from 1934 to 1935. He was an assistant to the special prosecutor of New York County from 1935 to 1937. He was Commissioner of Investigation for New York City from 1938 to 1944. He was a Judge of the New York Court of Domestic Relations in 1940, returning to private practice in New York City from 1940 to 1954. He was also a special assistant state attorney general of New York from 1944 to 1945, and a special prosecutor for Richmond County, New York from 1951 to 1954. He was a member of the New York State Board of Mediation from 1950 to 1954, and was special counsel to the New York State Tax Commission from 1953 to 1954. He was State Commissioner of Investigation for New York from 1954 to 1955.

== Federal judicial service ==
On August 12, 1955, Herlands received a recess appointment from President Dwight D. Eisenhower to a seat on the United States District Court for the Southern District of New York vacated by Judge Edward Augustus Conger. Formally nominated to the same seat by President Eisenhower on January 12, 1956, Herlands was confirmed by the United States Senate on June 26, 1956, and received his commission the next day. Herlands served in that capacity until his death on August 28, 1969, in New York City.

== Personal life ==
He was married to Gertrude Bendheim, daughter of Siegfried Bendheim, executive at Philipp Brothers.

== See also ==
- List of Jewish American jurists

== Sources ==
Legal offices
Preceded by Edward Augustus Conger	Judge of the United States District Court for the Southern District of New York; 1955–1969	Succeeded by Lawrence W. Pierce
