= Greg Calloway =

American businessman

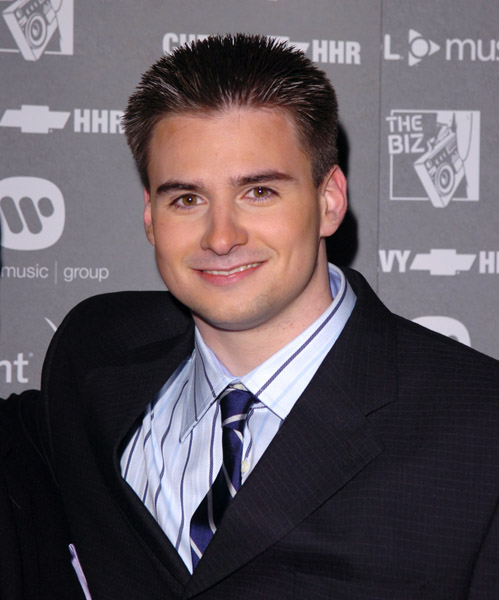
Greg Calloway

Greg Calloway is an American entrepreneur, artist and filmmaker from the Washington, D.C. area. In 2006, he won the AOL and Warner Music Group online reality show, The Biz.

The Biz was the music business version of Donald Trump's television program The Apprentice. On The Biz, Warner Music Group Chairman and CEO of US Recorded Music, Lyor Cohen, called the shots. The Biz featured nine contestants vying for the top job and facing real-life music industry challenges under the watchful eye of Mr. Cohen, to find out what it takes to be the next music mogul. Along the way they worked with artists such as Fall Out Boy, Panic! at the Disco, and Jason Mraz. They were advised by industry heavyweights such as Ahmet Ertegun, Jac Holzman, Kevin Liles, and Todd Moscowitz as they climbed the corporate ladder from intern to manager, director, Vice President and ultimately President.

After The Biz, Calloway founded a new venture called "Defient Entertainment". In 2012, Greg Calloway moved to Atlanta and relaunched Defient with B.o.B's manager, Brian "B Rich" Richardson and Doug Peterson from T.I's Grand Hustle records.
