= Harold E. Pierce =

American dermatologist (1922–2006)

Harold E. Pierce Jr.
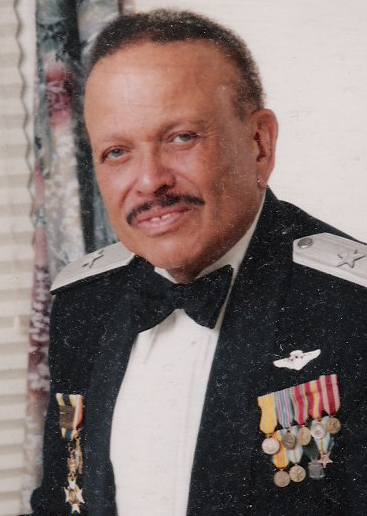
- Pierce in 1993
- Born: April 4, 1922; Philadelphia, Pennsylvania, U.S.
- Died: October 25, 2006 (aged 84); Philadelphia, Pennsylvania, U.S.
- Education: Lincoln University, Howard University School of Medicine
- Known for: Cosmetic Surgery and Dermatology
- Scientific career
- Workplaces: Howard University, University of Pennsylvania, Harlem Hospital

Harold E. Pierce Jr. Brigadier General (USAF, PANG, ret.) (April 4, 1922 – October 25, 2006) was an American dermatologist and cosmetic surgeon who practiced principally in Philadelphia, Pennsylvania for over 48 years. He pioneered surgical techniques for the treatment of keloids, laminar dermal reticulotomy, hair transplants, cosmetic facial surgery, chemical facial peeling, and dermabrasion in people of color. He was called "The Father of Black Cosmetic Surgery."

== Early life ==
Dr. Pierce was born on April 4, 1922, in Philadelphia to Mary Leora Bellinger Pierce and Harold Ernest Pierce, Sr. His mother was a classical pianist who played for Marian Anderson. The couple gave birth to two sons, Harold Ernest Pierce, Jr, and Justice Lawrence Warren Pierce who became a United States circuit judge of the United States Court of Appeals for the Second Circuit in the New York. Their mother, Leora, died when young Harold was seven years old. Their grandparents, Lillian A. Willets and Warren Wood Pierce of Bridgeton, New Jersey, raised him. While he was still young, Harold was estranged from his father, and as an adult, visited his father in Harlem. His Father had retired as a Laboratory Assistant from New York State Department of Mental Hygiene.

== Advanced study ==
After graduating from Bridgeton High School in New Jersey, Pierce received a B.S. degree from Lincoln University in 1942, and an MD from Howard University College of Medicine in 1946. Pierce completed an internship at Harlem Hospital in New York City, a residency in dermatology at the Philadelphia General Hospital and Fellowship in dermatology at the University of Pennsylvania's Graduate School of Medicine.

== Family life ==
On November 22, 1945, Harold married Constance Ella Mason, a mathematician and teacher in the Philadelphia school system. They were married for 44 years until her death in 1989. Pierce had three children, and four grandchildren. His eldest daughter became an attorney while the other two followed in his footsteps and became cosmetic surgeons and dermatologists. Dr. Pierce was the first of two generations to graduate Lincoln University and the first of three generations to graduate from Howard University.

== War years ==
In 1951, as the Korean War peaked, Pierce accepted an assignment as the Chief of Dermatology at the 1600 USAF Hospital at Westover Air Force Base in Massachusetts. In 1954, he became a General Medical Officer with the 111th Fighter Bomber.

After many distinguished years, he resigned from the Pennsylvania Air National Guard in 1976 in response to racial discrimination he witnessed and experienced within the military. In his explanation for his resignation written in June 1975, Pierce wrote, "It has become increasingly evident to me that my position -- advocating the rightful recognition of Blacks and minorities in this reserve component of the United States Air Force -- has been and continues to be at an impasse. Blacks are at the unrelenting mercy of one of the most horrendous racist military organizations in the United States. I am therefore voluntarily terminating my affiliation with the Pennsylvania Air National Guard, as I find it impossible to deal with the intransigence of the Commonwealth's military establishment."

He was promoted in 1987 on the Retired list to the rank of Brigadier General. He is the second African American to be given this ranking.

Pierce was active in the Civil Rights Movement, and even active as a child in the 1930s through his dissemination of Black Newspapers pushing for an end to the terrorizing lynchings of African Americans and their supporters that plagued America throughout the first half of the 20th century.

== Author ==
Pierce is the editor of the book Cosmetic Plastic Surgery in Nonwhite Patients, Grune & Stratton (New York, 1982). He taught for 17 years as a professor of dermatology at Howard University.

== Death ==
Pierce died at the age of 84 in Philadelphia from complications from prostate cancer. He worked daily as a doctor until the age of 83. Over five hundred people attended his funeral.
