= Joseph M. McLaughlin =

American judge (1933–2013)

Joseph Michael McLaughlin

Senior Judge of the United States Court of Appeals for the Second Circuit
- In office March 20, 1998 – August 8, 2013

Judge of the United States Court of Appeals for the Second Circuit
- In office October 17, 1990 – March 20, 1998
- Appointed by: George H. W. Bush
- Preceded by: Lawrence W. Pierce
- Succeeded by: Chester J. Straub

Judge of the United States District Court for the Eastern District of New York
- In office September 28, 1981 – October 18, 1990
- Appointed by: Ronald Reagan
- Preceded by: Seat established by 92 Stat. 1629
- Succeeded by: Sterling Johnson Jr.

Personal details
- Born: Joseph Michael McLaughlin; March 20, 1933 Brooklyn, New York
- Died: August 8, 2013 (aged 80) Queens, New York
- Domestic partner: Frances McLaughlin
- Children: Mary Jo Clines, Joseph McLaughlin, Matthew McLaughlin, and Andrew McLaughlin
- Parents: Joseph McLaughlin (father); Mary Flanagan (mother)
- Relatives: 13 grandchildren
- Education: Fordham University (AB); Fordham University School of Law (LLB); New York University School of Law (LLM)

Joseph Michael McLaughlin (March 20, 1933 – August 8, 2013) was a United States circuit judge of the United States Court of Appeals for the Second Circuit and a United States District Judge of the United States District Court for the Eastern District of New York.

== Biography ==
Joseph Michael McLaughlin was born in Brooklyn, New York on March 20, 1933. He was raised in a working-class family.

== Education and career ==
McLaughlin received an Artium Baccalaureus degree from Fordham College in 1954, and was a captain in the United States Army Corps of Engineers from 1955 to 1957. He then received a Bachelor of Laws from Fordham University School of Law in 1959, and a Master of Laws from New York University School of Law in 1964. He was in private practice of law in New York City from 1959 to 1961 at what is now Cahill Gordon & Reindel. He worked as a law professor at Fordham University School of Law in Manhattan from 1961 to 1971. In 1971, McLaughlin became Dean of Fordham Law School, a position he held for ten years.

== Federal judicial service ==
On July 29, 1981, McLaughlin was nominated by President Ronald Reagan to a new seat on the United States District Court for the Eastern District of New York created by 92 Stat. 1629. He was confirmed by the United States Senate on September 25, 1981, and received his commission on September 28, 1981. His service terminated on October 18, 1990, due to elevation to the court of appeals.

On July 10, 1990, President George H. W. Bush nominated McLaughlin for elevation to a seat on the United States Court of Appeals for the Second Circuit vacated by Judge Lawrence Warren Pierce. He was confirmed by the United States Senate on October 12, 1990, and received commission on October 17, 1990. McLaughlin assumed senior status on March 20, 1998 and continued to hear cases in that capacity.

== Other service ==
In addition to serving as a judge, since 1982, McLaughlin was an adjunct professor of law at St. John's University School of Law and Fordham University School of Law. His publications included numerous works on the law of evidence and civil procedure. Judge McLaughlin co-authored Cases and Methods on New York Practice. He was the author of Practice Commentaries for McKinney's New York CPLR and the PLI Monograph on Evidence. He was also the editor-in-chief of Federal Practice Guide (Matthew Bender), and of Weinstein’s Evidence (Matthew Bender).

== Death ==
McLaughlin died at a nursing home of pneumonia in 2013.

== Sources ==
- FJC Bio

Legal offices
Preceded by Seat established by 92 Stat. 1629	Judge of the United States District Court for the Eastern District of New York; 1981–1990	Succeeded by Sterling Johnson Jr.
Preceded by Lawrence W. Pierce	Judge of the United States Court of Appeals for the Second Circuit; 1990–1998	Succeeded by Chester J. Straub
