= Edward Augustus Conger =

American judge

Senior Judge of the United States District Court for the Southern District of New York
- In office October 20, 1954 – August 7, 1963

Judge of the United States District Court for the Southern District of New York
- In office June 24, 1938 – October 20, 1954
- Appointed by: Franklin D. Roosevelt
- Preceded by: Seat established by 52 Stat. 584
- Succeeded by: William Bernard Herlands

Personal details
- Born: Edward Augustus Conger; January 7, 1882 Poughkeepsie, New York
- Died: August 7, 1963 (aged 81) Poughkeepsie, New York
- Education: New York University School of Law read law

Edward Augustus Conger (January 7, 1882 – August 7, 1963) was a United States district judge of the United States District Court for the Southern District of New York.

== Education and career ==
Born on January 7, 1882, in Poughkeepsie, New York, Conger attend New York University School of Law and read law in 1904. He was an assistant district attorney of Dutchess County, New York from 1908 to 1913. He was the District Attorney of Dutchess County from 1913 to 1915. He was a Judge of the Poughkeepsie City Court from 1915 to 1919. He was in private practice in Poughkeepsie from 1919 to 1938.

== Federal judicial service ==
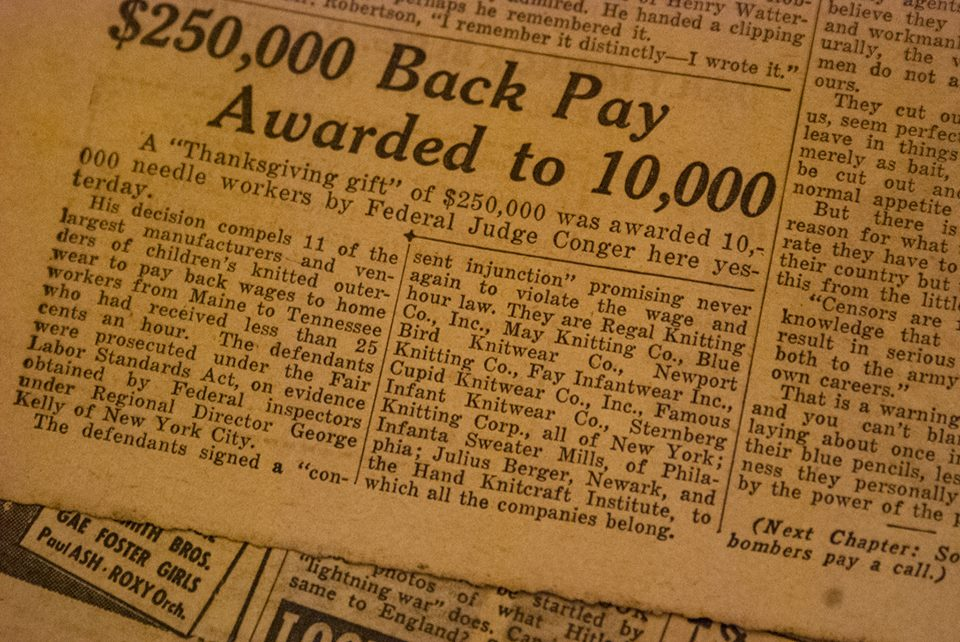
A newspaper clipping from Conger's time as a judge, discussing a ruling he handed down.

Conger was nominated by President Franklin D. Roosevelt on June 10, 1938, to the United States District Court for the Southern District of New York, to a new seat authorized by 52 Stat. 584. He was confirmed by the United States Senate on June 16, 1938, and received his commission on June 24, 1938. He assumed senior status on October 20, 1954. His service terminated on August 7, 1963, due to his death in Poughkeepsie.

== Sources ==
Legal offices
| Preceded by Seat established by 52 Stat. 584 | Judge of the United States District Court for the Southern District of New York; 1938–1954 | Succeeded by William Bernard Herlands |
