= Lawrence W. Pierce =

American judge (1924–2020)

Senior Judge of the United States Court of Appeals for the Second Circuit
- In office January 1, 1990 – March 31, 1995

Judge of the United States Court of Appeals for the Second Circuit
- In office November 18, 1981 – January 1, 1990
- Appointed by: Ronald Reagan
- Preceded by: Murray Gurfein
- Succeeded by: Joseph M. McLaughlin

Judge of the United States District Court for the Southern District of New York
- In office May 20, 1971 – November 30, 1981
- Appointed by: Richard Nixon
- Preceded by: William Bernard Herlands
- Succeeded by: Shirley Wohl Kram

Personal details
- Born: Lawrence Warren Pierce; December 31, 1924 Philadelphia, Pennsylvania, U.S.
- Died: February 5, 2020 (aged 95) Boca Raton, Florida, U.S.
- Education: Saint Joseph's University (BS); Fordham University (LLB)

Lawrence Warren Pierce (December 31, 1924 – February 5, 2020) was a United States circuit judge of the United States Court of Appeals for the Second Circuit and a former United States district judge of the United States District Court for the Southern District of New York.

== Education and career ==
Pierce was born in Philadelphia, Pennsylvania. He received a Bachelor of Science degree from St. Joseph's University in 1948. He received a Bachelor of Laws from Fordham University School of Law in 1951. He was in the United States Army from 1943 to 1946 and served in the 92nd Infantry Division in Italy. He became a sergeant. He was a staff attorney of the Legal Aid Society of New York City from 1951 to 1953. He was an assistant district attorney of Kings County, New York from 1954 to 1961. He was a deputy commissioner of police, New York City from 1961 to 1963. He was the Director of the New York State Division for Youth from 1963 to 1966. He was Chairman of the New York State Narcotic Addiction Control Commission from 1966 to 1970. He was a visiting professor of the Graduate School of Criminal Justice at the University at Albany, SUNY from 1970 to 1971.

== Federal judicial service ==
Pierce was nominated by President Richard Nixon on April 26, 1971, to a seat on the United States District Court for the Southern District of New York vacated by Judge William Bernard Herlands. He was confirmed by the United States Senate on May 20, 1971, and received commission the same day. His service was terminated on November 30, 1981, due to elevation to the Second Circuit.

Pierce was nominated by President Ronald Reagan on September 8, 1981, to a seat on the United States Court of Appeals for the Second Circuit vacated by Judge Murray Gurfein. He was confirmed by the Senate on November 18, 1981, and received commission the same day. Pierce became the third African-American to serve on the Second Circuit, following Thurgood Marshall and Amalya Lyle Kearse. He assumed senior status on January 1, 1990. He retired on March 31, 1995.

In 1978, Chief Justice Warren Burger appointed Pierce to serve on the Foreign Intelligence Surveillance Court. He also was the American Bar Association's Alternate Observer at the United Nations.

== Post-retirement ==
In 1995 he retired from the federal judiciary in order to travel abroad and he became Director of the USAID-funded Cambodian Court Training Project Cambodia.

== Family ==
Born in Philadelphia, Pennsylvania, his mother, Mary Leora Bellinger Pierce, a classical pianist who accompanied Marian Anderson, died of pneumonia when he was five years old. Pierce was raised by his step-mother, Violet Abrahams Pierce, a registered nurse, and, until he was eleven, by his father, Harold E. Pierce Sr.. Lawrence and his older brother, Dr. Harold E. Pierce Jr, M.D., were separated and only reunited on holidays at the home of their paternal grandparents, Lillian Willets Pierce and Warren Wood Pierce.

Pierce was married twice, first to Wilma Verenia Taylor, with whom he had three sons, Warren, Michael and Mark. Warren and Michael followed in their father's footsteps and studied law. Mark works overseas as a Regional Director with Plan International. Pierce has five granddaughters, one grandson and one great-granddaughter.

After his first wife's death, Pierce married Cynthia Straker, a former federal attorney and a professor at Howard University and St. John's University Law School. Cynthia died November 30, 2011. The couple resided in Sag Harbor, New York. Pierce died on February 5, 2020, at the age of 95 at his home in Boca Raton, Florida.

== Genealogy search ==
Pierce devoted several years to researching his family history and discovered two black forebears who were brothers, Richard and Anthony Pierce, both seamen. They met two Dutch sisters who were indentured servants, Hannah and Marie Van Aca. The brothers bought their freedom and married them. They settled in Cumberland County, New Jersey. Richard and Hannah's son, Adam, served in the New Jersey Militia, which fought in the Revolutionary War at the Battles of Crosswicks and Monmouth. Based on his historical lineage, Pierce joined the S.A.R. and the Sons of the Revolution at Fraunces Tavern, where he served as a vice-president. Family members thereafter became members of the S.A.R. and D.A.R. For consecutive years, Ebony Magazine listed Pierce as one of the most influential African Americans in the United States.

== See also ==
- List of African-American federal judges
- List of African-American jurists

== Sources ==
- Steward, William, A.M. and Steward, Theophilus G., Rev., D.D., "GOULDTOWN A Very Remarkable Settlement of Ancient Date," J.B. Lippincott Co., Philadelphia, 1913; Reprinted by Fairfield Twnshp. Bd. of Ed., Bridgeton, NJ, 1994.

Legal offices
Preceded by William Bernard Herlands	Judge of the United States District Court for the Southern District of New York; 1971–1981	Succeeded by Shirley Wohl Kram
Preceded by Murray Gurfein	Judge of the United States Court of Appeals for the Second Circuit; 1981–1990	Succeeded by Joseph M. McLaughlin
