= Sterling Johnson Jr. =

American judge (1934–2022)

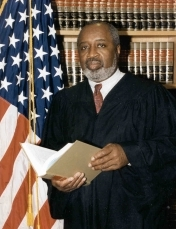

Senior Judge of the United States District Court for the Eastern District of New York
- In office June 1, 2003 – October 10, 2022

Judge of the United States District Court for the Eastern District of New York
- In office July 2, 1991 – June 1, 2003
- Appointed by: George H. W. Bush
- Preceded by: Joseph M. McLaughlin
- Succeeded by: Sandra L. Townes

Personal details
- Born: May 14, 1934 New York City, New York, U.S.
- Died: October 10, 2022 (aged 88) Brooklyn, New York, U.S.
- Education: Brooklyn College (BA); Brooklyn Law School (LLB)
- Police Career
- Department: New York City Police Department
- Service years: 1956–1967

Sterling Johnson Jr. (May 14, 1934 – October 10, 2022) was a United States district judge of the United States District Court for the Eastern District of New York. Before his appointment to the bench in 1991, Johnson was an attorney for 25 years, specializing in drug enforcement and the prosecution of narcotics cases. As Special Narcotics Prosecutor for the City of New York, he supervised assistant district attorneys and investigators responsible for the preparation and prosecution of more than 7,000 criminal cases. He has been a guest lecturer at many American universities and law schools, as well as in various countries.

== Education and career ==
Johnson was born in Brooklyn, New York City. He received a Bachelor of Arts degree from Brooklyn College in 1963. He received a Bachelor of Laws from Brooklyn Law School in 1966. He was in the United States Marine Corps from 1952 to 1955.

Johnson was a police officer of the New York City Police Department from 1956 to 1967. He was an Assistant United States Attorney of the Southern District of New York from 1967 to 1970. He was the executive director of the Civilian Complaint Review Board of the New York City Police Department from 1970 to 1974. He was an executive liaison officer of the United States Drug Enforcement Administration from 1974 to 1975. He was a special narcotics prosecutor for New York City from 1975 to 1991. He was a Commissioner of the United States Sentencing Commission from 1999 to 2003.

== Federal judicial service ==
Johnson was nominated by President George H. W. Bush on May 17, 1991, to a seat on the United States District Court for the Eastern District of New York vacated by Judge Joseph M. McLaughlin. He was confirmed by the United States Senate on June 27, 1991, and received commission on July 2, 1991. He assumed senior status on June 1, 2003. Johnson died on October 10, 2022, aged 88.

== Other service ==
Johnson was a founding member of NOBLE, a national organization of African American police officers.

== See also ==
- List of African-American federal judges
- List of African-American jurists

Legal offices
Preceded by Frank J. Rogers	Special Narcotics Prosecutor for the City of New York; 1975–1991	Succeeded by Robert H. Silbering
Preceded by Joseph M. McLaughlin	Judge of the United States District Court for the Eastern District of New York; 1991–2003	Succeeded by Sandra L. Townes
