= 1967 Nobel Prize in Literature =

- Miguel Ángel Asturias
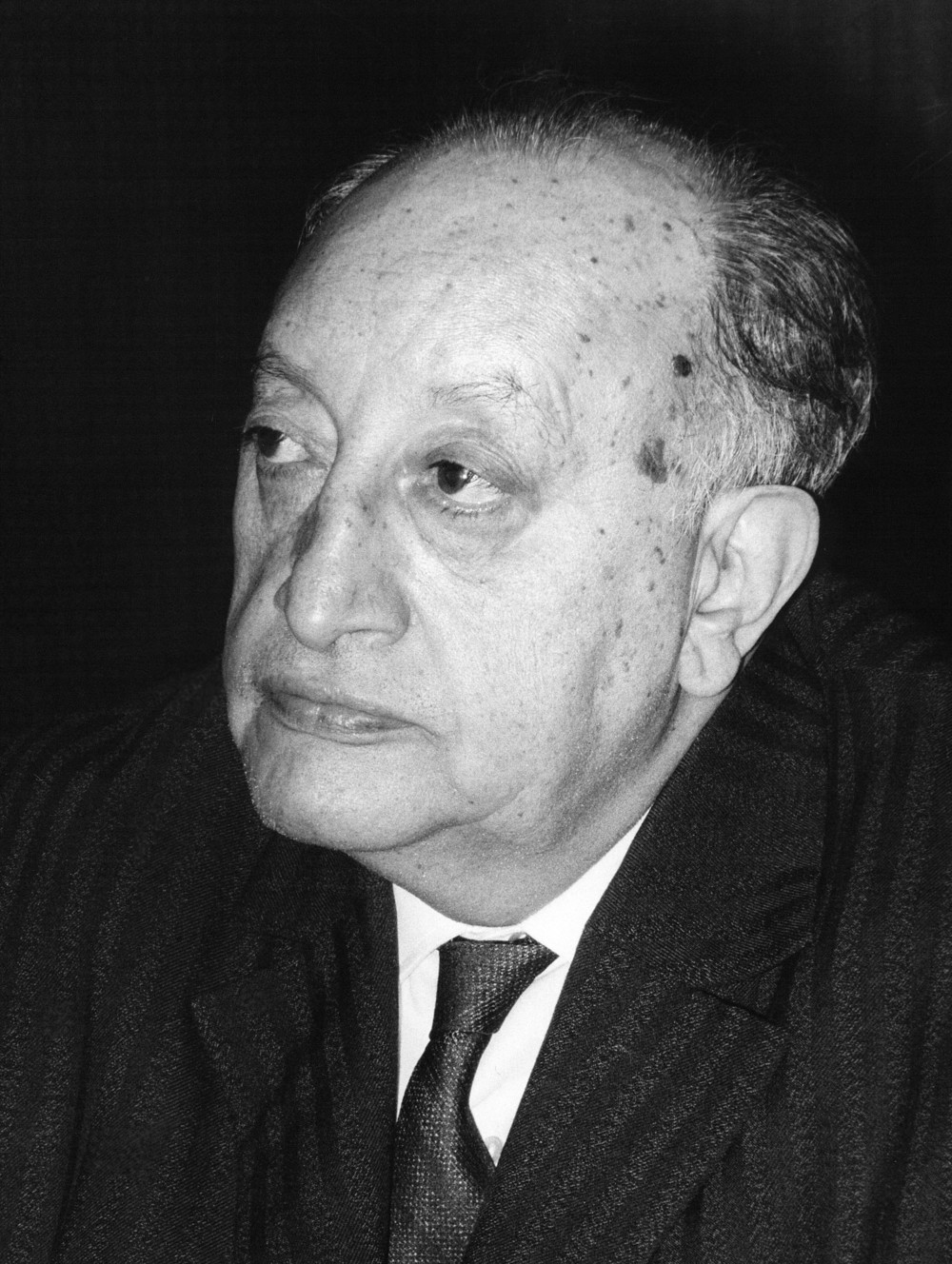
- "for his vivid literary achievement, deep-rooted in the national traits and traditions of Indian peoples of Latin America."
- Date: 19 October 1967 (announcement); 10 December 1967 (ceremony)
- Location: Stockholm, Sweden
- Presented by: Swedish Academy
- First award: 1901
- Website: Official website

The 1967 Nobel Prize in Literature was awarded to the Guatemalan writer Miguel Ángel Asturias (1899–1974) "for his vivid literary achievement, deep-rooted in the national traits and traditions of Indian peoples of Latin America." He is the first Guatemalan and the second Latin American author to receive the prize after the Chilean poet Gabriela Mistral won in 1945.

== Laureate ==
Miguel Angel Asturias first book Leyendas de Guatemala ("Legends of Guatemala", 1930) is a compilation of stories originating from Mayan legends. His debut novel El Señor Presidente ("The President", 1946) was a brutal portrayal of a Latin American dictatorship in the early 20th century. He wrote a trilogy – The Banana Trilogy – about the rampage of the United Fruit Company in Guatemala in the 1950s, which included Viento Fuerte ("Strong Wind", 1950), El Papa Verde ("The Green Pope", 1954), and Los ojos de los enterrados ("The Eyes of the Interred", 1960). The works of Asturias are pervaded with social pathos and a potent language that fuses myth and reality, and are generally concerned with repression and injustice against the poor and the weak, both in Guatemala and the rest of Latin America. His other well-known works include Hombres de maíz ("Men of Maize", 1949) and Mulata de tal ("The Mulatta and Mr. Fly", 1963).

== Deliberations ==
=== Nominations ===
Miguel Ángel Asturias was first nominated in 1964 by Erik Lindegren, a member of the Swedish Academy, and became an annual nominee until 1967 when he was eventually awarded with the prize. He received 3 nominations in 1967 with a single joint nomination with Argentinian writer Jorge Luis Borges.

In total, the Nobel Committee received 112 nominations for 69 writers including Samuel Beckett, Thornton Wilder, Lawrence Durrell, E. M. Forster, Georges Simenon, Ezra Pound, Robert Graves, André Malraux and J. R. R. Tolkien. Eighteen of the nominees were nominated first-time such as Ivan Drach, Carlos Drummond de Andrade, Rabbe Enckell, Saul Bellow (awarded in 1976), Jorge Amado, György Lukács, Claude Simon (awarded in 1985), Pavlo Tychyna, and Hans Magnus Enzensberger. The highest number of nominations was for the Spanish writer José María Pemán with eight nominations from academics and literary critics. The oldest nominee was the Spanish philologist Ramón Menéndez Pidal (aged 98) and the youngest was Soviet-Ukrainian poet Ivan Drach (aged 31). Five of the nominees were women namely Katherine Anne Porter, Marie Luise Kaschnitz, Lina Kostenko, Anna Seghers and Judith Wright.

The authors Djamaluddin Adinegoro, Marcel Aymé, Samira Azzam, Margaret Ayer Barnes, Vladimir Bartol, Ion Buzdugan, Ilya Ehrenburg, Forough Farrokhzad, Sidney Bradshaw Fay, Hugo Gernsback, João Guimarães Rosa, Langston Hughes, Lajos Kassák, Patrick Kavanagh, Margaret Kennedy, José Martínez Ruiz, André Maurois, Carson McCullers, Christopher Okigbo, Dorothy Parker, Arthur Ransome, Elmer Rice, Georges Sadoul, Siegfried Sassoon, Alice B. Toklas, Jean Toomer, David Unaipon, Robert van Gulik, Adrienne von Speyr, and Vernon Watkins died in 1967 without having been nominated for the prize. The Ukrainian poet Pavlo Tychyna died months before the announcement.

Official list of nominees and their nominators for the prize
No.	Nominee	Country	Genre(s)	Nominator(s)
1	Jorge Amado (1912–2001)	Brazil	novel, short story	Earl William Thomas (1915–1981); Antônio Olinto (1919–2009); Fred Ellison (1922–2014); Sociedade Brasileira de Autores Teatrais; Brazilian Writers Association
2	Carlos Drummond de Andrade (1902–1987)	Brazil	poetry, essays	Gunnar Ekelöf (1907–1968)
3	Louis Aragon (1897–1982)	France	novel, short story, poetry, essays	Cyrille Arnavon (1915–1978)
4	Miguel Ángel Asturias (1899–1974)	Guatemala	novel, short story, poetry, essays, drama	André Saint-Lu (1916–2009); Hans Hinterhäuser (1919–2005); Henry Olsson (1896–1985)
5	Wystan Hugh Auden (1907–1973)	United Kingdom; United States	poetry, essays, screenplay	Walther Braune (1900–1989)
6	Samuel Beckett (1906–1989)	Ireland	novel, drama, poetry	Siegbert Salomon Prawer (1925–2012); Barbara Hardy (1924–2016); Per-Olof Barck (1912–1978); William Stuart Maguinness (1903–1983); The Swedish PEN Club; Nelly Sachs (1891–1970)
7	Saul Bellow (1915–2005)	Canada; United States	novel, short story, memoir, essays	PEN Centre Germany
8	Jorge Luis Borges (1899–1986)	Argentina	poetry, essays, translation, short story	Henry Olsson (1896–1985); Raimundo Lida (1908–1979); Gustaf Fredén (1898–1987)
9	Emil Boyson (1897–1979)	Norway	poetry, novel, translation	Asbjørn Aarnes (1923–2013)
10	Arturo Capdevila (1889–1967)	Argentina	poetry, drama, novel, short story, essays, history	Rodolfo Maria Ragucci (1887–1973); Pedro Miguel Obligado (1892–1967); Edmundo Correas (1901–1991)
11	Josep Carner (1884–1970)	Spain	poetry, drama, translation	Jordi Rubió (1887–1982); Marie-Jeanne Durry (1901–1980)
12	Alejo Carpentier (1904–1980)	Cuba	novel, short story, essays	Lars Gyllensten (1921–2006)
13	René Char (1907–1988)	France	poetry	Georges Blin (1917–2015)
14	Mohammad-Ali Jamalzadeh (1892–1997)	Iran	short story, translation	Ehsan Yarshater (1920–2018)
15	Lawrence Durrell (1912–1990)	United Kingdom	novel, short story, poetry, drama, essays	Harald Patzer (1910–2005)
16	Rabbe Enckell (1903–1974)	Finland	short story, poetry	Kauko Aatos Ojala (1919–1987)
17	Hans Magnus Enzensberger (1929–2022)	West Germany	poetry, essays, translation	Wolfgang Baumgart (1949–2011)
18	Edward Morgan Forster (1879–1970)	United Kingdom	novel, short story, drama, essays, biography, literary criticism	Albrecht Dihle (1923–2020)
19	Max Frisch (1911–1991)	Switzerland	novel, drama	John Stephenson Spink (1909–1985); Heinrich Matthias Heinrichs (1911–1983)
20	Rómulo Gallegos (1884–1969)	Venezuela	novel, short story	Lars Gyllensten (1921–2006)
21	Jean Genet (1910–1986)	France	novel, autobiography, drama, screenplay, poetry, essays	Karl Ragnar Gierow (1904–1982)
22	Jean Giono (1895–1970)	France	novel, short story, essays, poetry, drama	Henri Peyre (1901–1988); Louis Moulinier (1904–1971)
23	Witold Gombrowicz (1904–1969)	Poland	short story, novel, drama	Henry Olsson (1896–1985)
24	Robert Graves (1895–1985)	United Kingdom	history, novel, poetry, literary criticism, essays	John Wintour Baldwin Barns (1912–1974)
25	Graham Greene (1904–1991)	United Kingdom	novel, short story, autobiography, essays	Karl Ragnar Gierow (1904–1982)
26	Lawrence Sargent Hall (1915–1993)	United States	novel, short story, essays	Robert Brumbaugh (1918–1992)
27	Taha Hussein (1889–1973)	Egypt	novel, short story, poetry, translation	Jussi Aro (1928–1983)
28	Eugène Ionesco (1909–1994)	Romania; France	drama, essays	Karl Ragnar Gierow (1904–1982)
29	Ernst Jünger (1895–1998)	West Germany	philosophy, novel, memoir	Rudolf Till (1911–1979)
30	Friedrich Georg Jünger (1898–1977)	West Germany	poetry, essays, novel, drama	Fritz Schalk (1902–1980)
31	Marie Luise Kaschnitz (1901–1974)	West Germany	novel, short story, essays, drama	Hermann Tiemann (1899–1981)
32	Yasunari Kawabata (1899–1972)	Japan	novel, short story	Howard Hibbett (1920–2019)
33	Basij Khalkhali (1918–1995)	Iran	poetry	Sadeq Rezazadeh Shafaq (1892–1971)
34	Väinö Linna (1920–1992)	Finland	novel	Lars Huldén (1926–2016)
35	György Lukács (1885–1971)	Hungary	philosophy, literary criticism	Erik Lindegren (1910–1968)
36	Karl Löwith (1897–1973)	West Germany	philosophy	Franz Dirlmeier (1904–1977)
37	André Malraux (1901–1976)	France	novel, essays, literary criticism	Henri Peyre (1901–1988); Henry Caraway Hatfield (1912–1995); Claude Digeon (1920–2008); John Martin Cocking (1914–1986); François Chamoux (1915–2007)
38	Ramón Menéndez Pidal (1869–1968)	Spain	philology, history	Gunnar Tilander (1894–1973); Marcel Bataillon (1895–1977)
39	Yukio Mishima (1925–1970)	Japan	novel, short story, drama, literary criticism	Harry Martinson (1904–1978)
40	Eugenio Montale (1896–1981)	Italy	poetry, translation	Uberto Limentani (1913–1989)
41	Henry de Montherlant (1895–1972)	France	essays, novel, drama	Pierre Grimal (1912–1996)
42	Alberto Moravia (1907–1990)	Italy	novel, literary criticism, essays, drama	Gustaf Fredén (1898–1987)
43	Pablo Neruda (1904–1973)	Chile	poetry	André Saint-Lu (1916–2009)
44	Junzaburō Nishiwaki (1894–1982)	Japan	poetry, literary criticism	Naoshirō Tsuji (1899–1979)
45	Germán Pardo García (1902–1991)	Colombia; Mexico	poetry	James Willis Robb (1918–2010)
46	Konstantin Paustovsky (1892–1968)	Soviet Union	novel, poetry, drama	Eyvind Johnson (1900–1976)
47	José María Pemán (1897–1981)	Spain	poetry, drama, novel, essays, screenplay	Marcel Baiche (1920–2003); Martí de Riquer i Morera (1914–2013); Robert Ricard (1900–1984); José Sánchez Lasso de la Vega (1928–1996); Rafael Lapesa Melgar (1908–2001); Pierre Jobit (1892–1972); Manuel Halcón y Villalón-Daoíz (1900–1989); Sociedad General de Autores y Editores
48	André Pézard (1893–1984)	France	translation, essays	Wilhelm Theodor Elwert (1906–1997)
49	Katherine Anne Porter (1890–1980)	United States	short story, essays	Cleanth Brooks (1906–1994)
50	Ezra Pound (1885–1972)	United States	poetry, essays	Hildebrecht Hommel (1899–1986); Berta Moritz-Siebeck (1912–1989)
51	Zayn al-ʻĀbidīn Rahnamā (1894–1990)	Iran	history, essays, translation	The Iranian PEN Club
52	Anna Seghers (1900–1983)	East Germany	novel, short story	Akademie der Künste der DDR
53	Georges Simenon (1903–1989)	Belgium	novel, short story, memoir	Justin O'Brien (1906–1968)
54	Claude Simon (1913–2005)	France	novel, essays	Erik Lindegren (1910–1968)
55	Charles Percy Snow (1905–1980)	United Kingdom	novel, essays	Friedrich Schubel (1904–1991)
56	John Ronald Reuel Tolkien (1892–1973)	United Kingdom	novel, short story, poetry, philology, essays, literary criticism	Gösta Holm (1916–2011)
57	Pavlo Tychyna (1891–1967)	Soviet Union	poetry, translation	Omeljan Pritsak (1919–2006)
58	Ivan Drach (1936–2018)	Soviet Union	poetry, literary criticism, drama	Omeljan Pritsak (1919–2006)
59	Lina Kostenko (1930–)	Soviet Union	poetry, novel	Omeljan Pritsak (1919–2006)
60	Pietro Ubaldi (1886–1972)	Italy	philosophy, essays	Academia Santista de Letras
61	Robert Penn Warren (1905–1989)	United States	novel, poetry, essays, literary criticism	Franz Link (1924–2001)
62	Tarjei Vesaas (1897–1970)	Norway	poetry, novel	Carl-Eric Thors (1920–1986); Sigmund Skard (1903–1995); Johannes Andreasson Dale (1898–1975); Norwegian Authors' Union
63	Simon Vestdijk (1898–1971)	Netherlands	novel, poetry, essays, translation	Gerhard Cordes (1908–1985); Pierre Brachin (1914–2004); The Dutch PEN-Club; Netherlands Writers Association
64	Thornton Wilder (1897–1975)	United States	drama, novel, short story	Hildebrecht Hommel (1899–1986); Frederick Albert Pottle (1897–1987); Stuart Pratt Atkins (1914–2000)
65	Edmund Wilson (1895–1972)	United States	essays, literary criticism, short story, drama	Wiktor Weintraub (1908–1988); Morton Wilfred Bloomfield (1913–1987)
66	Judith Wright (1915–2000)	Australia	poetry, literary criticism, novel, essays	Mary Durack (1913–1994); Colin James Horne (1939–1999); Greta Hort (1903–1967); Torsten Dahl (1897–1968)
67	Carl Zuckmayer (1896–1977)	West Germany	drama, screenplay	Günther Jachmann (1887–1979); Walter Hinck (1922–2015)
68	Arnold Zweig (1887–1968)	East Germany	novel, short story	Akademie der Künste der DDR
69	Arnulf Øverland (1889–1968)	Norway	poetry, essays	Eyvind Johnson (1900–1976)

=== Prize decision ===
Asturias was shortlisted along with Jorge Luis Borges, Graham Greene, W.H. Auden and Yasunari Kawabata (awarded in 1968). Anders Österling, chairman of the Swedish Academy's Nobel committee, favored Graham Greene whom he described as "an accomplished observer whose experience encompasses a global diversity of external environments, and above all the mysterious aspects of the inner world, human conscience, anxiety and nightmares", Österling's second proposal was Kawabata, and Auden his third. An opposing group in the committee including Eyvind Johnson, Erik Lindegren and Henry Olsson did not agree with Österling and presented an alternative proposal with a shared prize to Asturias and Borges as their first proposal, Auden their second and Kawabata their third proposal. The fifth member of the committee, Karl Ragnar Gierow, gave the oppositions proposal his support by proposing Asturias/Borges, Auden and Kawabata in no particular order. Ultimately a shared prize was rejected and Asturias alone was awarded. Despite Asturias winning the prize, Österling regarded him as a writer "too narrowly limited in his revolutionary subject world" and Borges as "too exclusive or artificial in his ingenious miniature art".

== Reactions ==
Largely unknown outside of the Spanish American literary world, Asturias was a surprise choice to many contemporary commentators who noted that there were other Spanish language authors more deserving of the Nobel prize.

== Award ceremony speech ==
At the award ceremony in Stockholm on 10 December 1967, Anders Österling, permanent secretary of the Swedish Academy said:

This year the Nobel Prize in Literature has been awarded to the Guatemalan writer Miguel Angel Asturias, a prominent representative of the modern literature of Latin America, in which such interesting developments are now taking place. Born in 1899 in the capital of Guatemala, Asturias became imbued, even as a child, with the characteristically Guatemalan love of nature and of the mythical world. He devoted to this native heritage, and to its libertarian spirit, a fervour which was to dominate his whole literary production. (...) Latin America today can boast an active group of prominent writers, a multivoiced chorus in which individual contributions are not readily discernible. Asturias’s work is nevertheless vast, bold, and outstanding enough to arouse interest outside of his own literary milieu, beyond a geographically limited area situated far away from us.

== Nobel lecture ==
Miguel Angel Asturias delivered his Nobel lecture entitled The Latin American Novel Testimony of an Epoch on 12 December 1967. In it he spoke about the tradition and characteristics of the Latin American novel, and stated:

We, the Latin American novelists of today, working within the tradition of engagement with our peoples which has enabled our great literature to develop – our poetry of substance – also have to reclaim lands for our dispossessed, mines for our exploited workers, to raise demands in favour of the masses who perish in the plantations, who are scorched by the sun in the banana fields, who turn into human bagasse in the sugar refineries. It is for this reason that – for me – the authentic Latin American novel is the call for all these things, it is the cry that echoes down the centuries and is pronounced in thousands of pages.
