= Guatemalan art =

Guatemalan art refers to all forms of visual art associated with a Guatemalan national identity either because they are created within Guatemala, for Guatemalans, or by Guatemalans. The visual arts in Guatemala consist largely of weaving, muralism, painting, architecture, and the performing arts. Most analysis of Guatemalan and Indigenous artwork focuses on the artform of weaving, but contemporary Guatemalan visual art largely consists of painting, muralism, and more that can convey modern social values as well as ancestral indigenous history. Historically, art in Guatemala has combined the mythological heritage of the Indigenous Maya people with the country's politics. Beyond Guatemala, Guatemalan Indigenous artwork is also sometimes referred to as "art naïf," "primitivism," 'traditional art," "Maya art," and "costumbrismo".

== Painting ==
Differing from many Western paintings, Guatemalan Indigenous paintings tend to depict daily experiences and situations. Artists such as Andrés Currichich and Erick Unen depict scenes of Guatemalans conducting everyday tasks, such as shopping at a local marketplace, weaving in living rooms, or cooking meals in the kitchen. Notably, many Guatemalan artists depict Indigenous Maya culture, clothing, and living without romanticization. Rather than being created for the sake of aesthetic originality, paintings, in particular, are created in Guatemala to depict historical events, to transmit cultural experiences between generations, and to convey the domestic life of many Guatemalans.

== Muralism ==
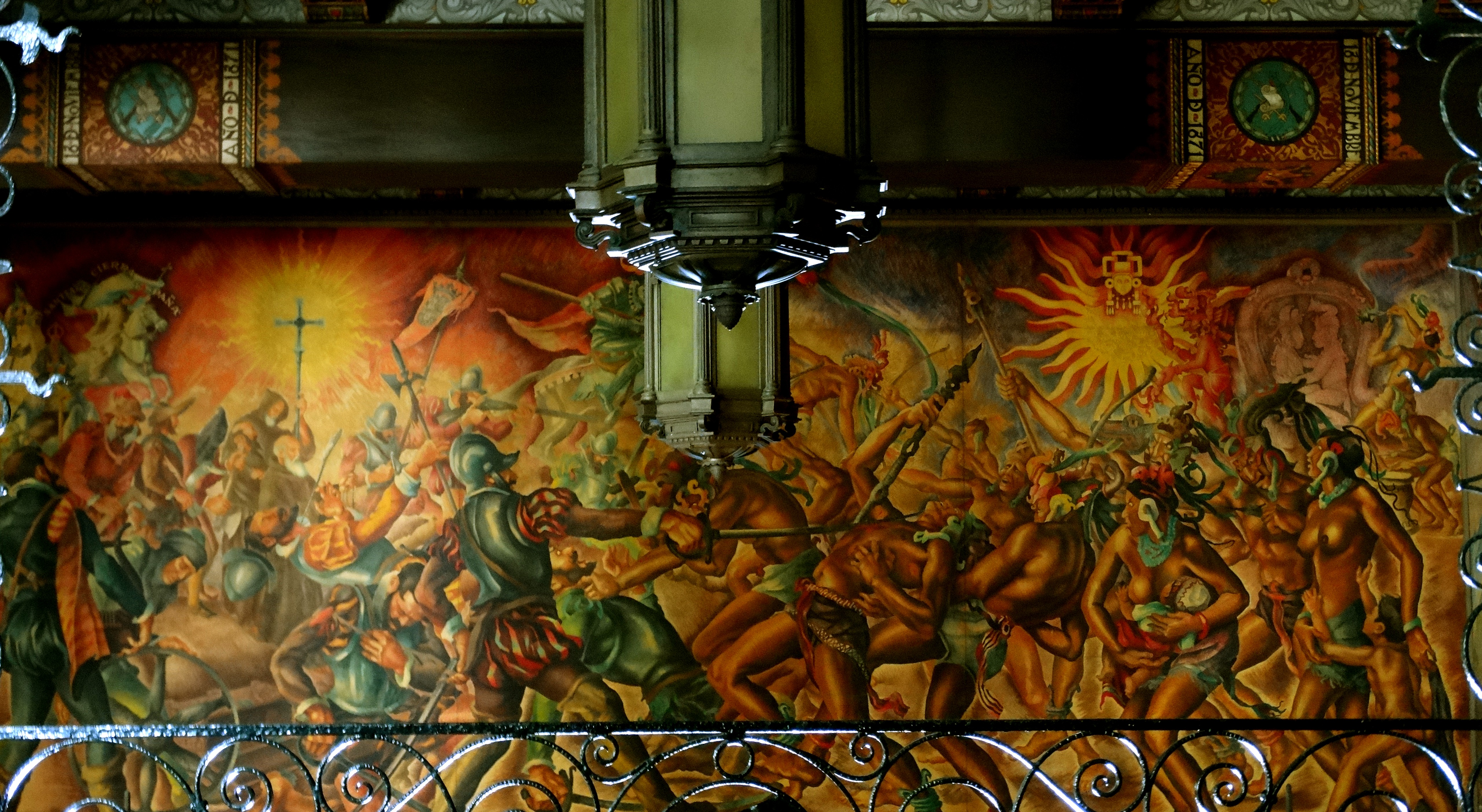
Mural in the Centro Historico de Guatemala Palacio Nacional

Unlike many paintings, murals are often commissioned by government agencies and, therefore, are more likely to reflect ideals that the government finds favorable. Additionally, murals not commissioned by the government are subject to censorship because of the public nature of these works.

As opposed to Guatemalan paintings, murals are more often designed for aesthetic appeal and social commentary, rather than as a medium to communicate history. Censored works by artist Efraín Recinos portray women being kidnapped, tied up, and blindfolded. Many of Recinos' censored murals depict civilians being silenced, and killed in some instances, by the government during the Guatemalan Civil War.

== Architecture ==
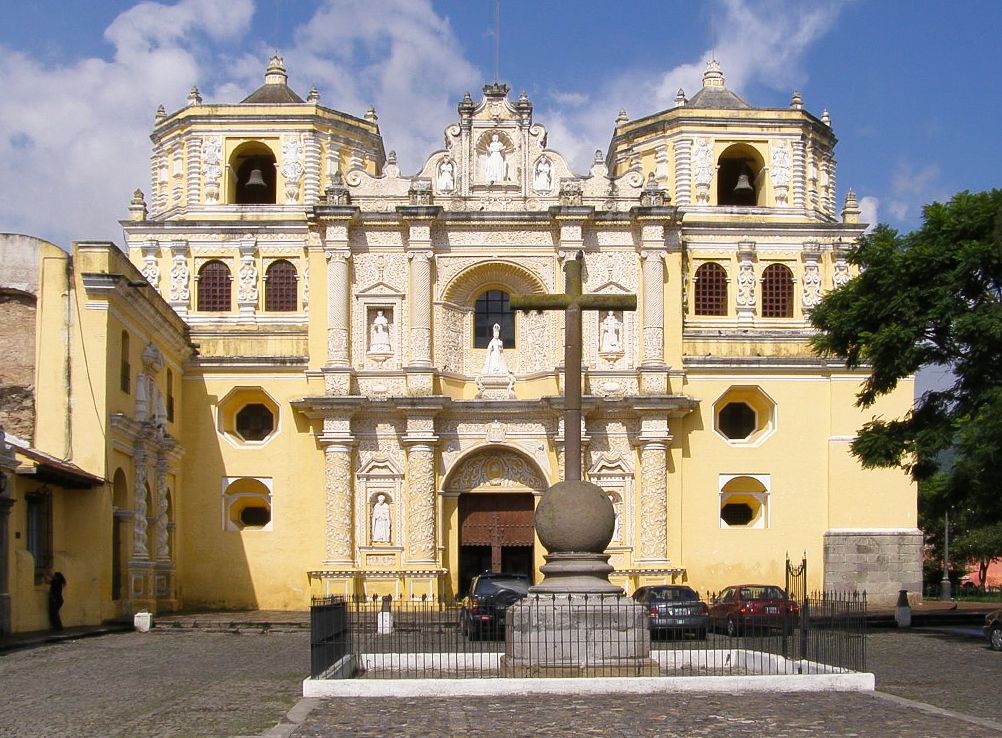
The La Merced Church in Antigua, Guatemala

Much of Guatemala's architecture is influenced by Spanish styles due to its history as a colonial territory of Spain. Spanish influence can be seen particularly well in the structures of The Antigua Cathedral and the La Merced Church, both of which were built in the colonial era. Colonial architecture is seen widely in many large cities, including Guatemala City and Antigua.

Like much of Latin America, Guatemalan architects have been heavily influenced by modernism. Traditionally used to refer to painting and literature, the term "modernism" has also recently been used to refer to architecture. In particular, modernist architecture is also combined with brutalist aspects, as can be seen in the Miguel Angel Asturias Cultural Center. Architectural styles in Guatemala vary widely, however, ranging from the 1978 open-air theatre and brutalist designs of the Miguel Angel Asturias Cultural Center to the fourth-century Mayan pyramids of Tikal.

== Textiles ==
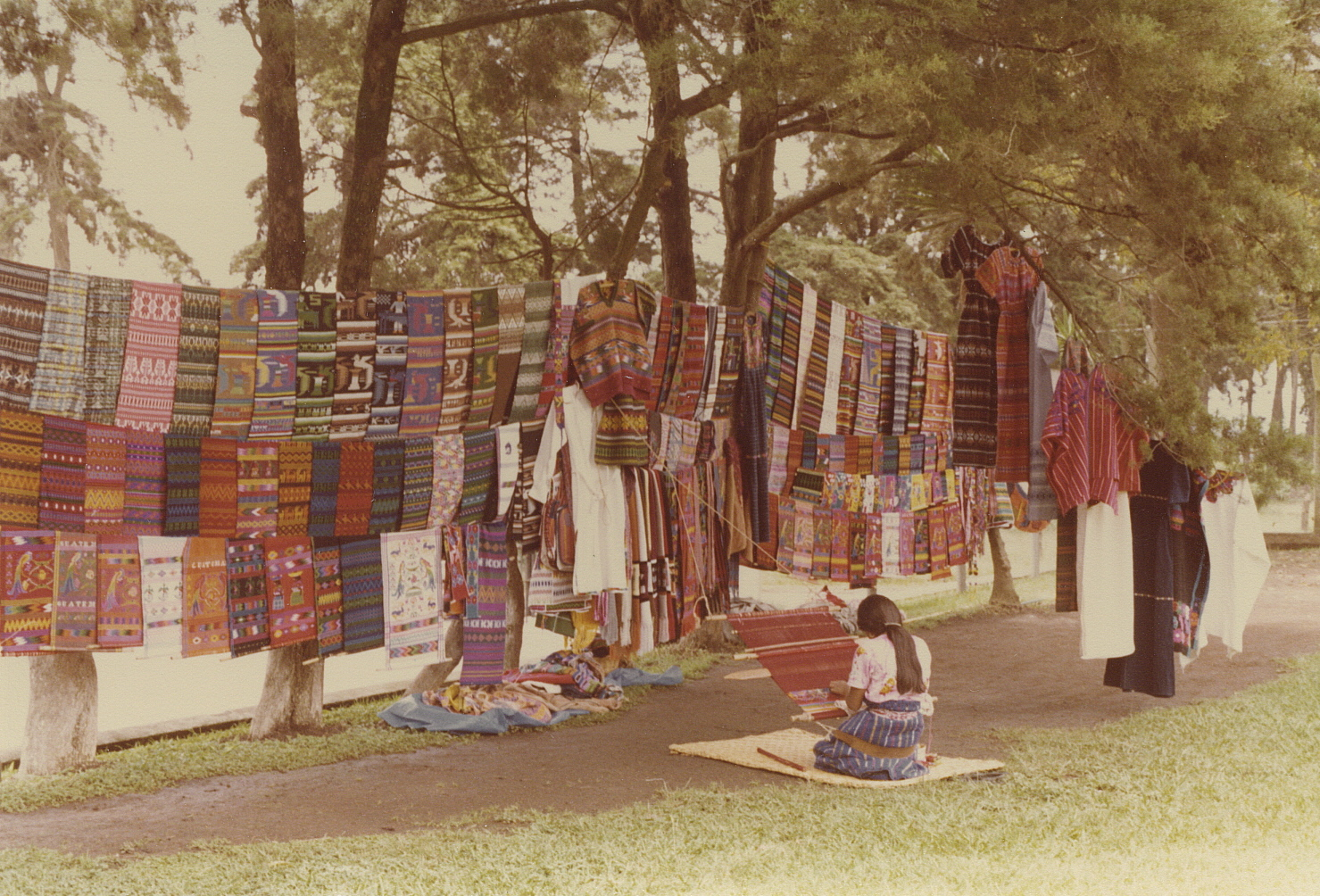
Maya woven textiles in Guatemala

One of the most commonly studied artforms associated with Guatemalan national identity is the creation of textiles through weaving. This form of artistic expression has heavy ties to the Mayan Indigenous heritage of many modern Guatemalans. Woven textiles traditionally constitute the majority of Maya dress. These garments are historically made by women with the help of backstrap looms and embroidered by hand. However, modern garments are often made by men on foot looms. Many of these woven garments are made with dyed cotton, with some textiles incorporating silver-plated synthetic threads through embroidery. Designs in Guatemalan textiles include geometric patterns, motifs of animals, and religious symbols. Since the sixteenth century, huipiles and other woven pieces of Mayan dress have featured the signs of the K'iche lords from the Popol Wuj.

=== Huipiles ===
Mayan woven blouses known as huipiles are perhaps one of the most commonly seen woven textiles in Guatemala. The käqpo't, or red huipil, is one such type of huipil woven by the Kaqchikels and Tz'utujils. This type of huipil is known for its characteristic use of red thread, known locally as rukreya. These huipiles always feature a red rutele'n section at the shoulders of the wearer. The top half of these garments often feature designs and motifs, ranging from geometric designs to zoomorphic designs.

== See also ==
- Culture of Guatemala
- Indigenous People of Guatemala
- Efraín Recinos
- Aníbal López
- Luis González Palma
