= El Sombrerón =

Guatemalan legendary character

El Sombrerón is a legendary character and one of the most famous legends of Guatemala, told in books and film El Sombrerón is also a bogeyman figure in Mexico.

This character is also known with other names, like Tzipitio, the goblin, and sometimes Tzizimite, his main characteristics are always the same: a tall man with black dress, a thick and brilliant belt; he wears a black, massive hat, and boots that make a lot of noise when he walks.

He likes to ride horses and braid their tails and manes. When he cannot find horses, he braids the hair of dogs. He also likes to court young ladies who have long hair and big eyes. When he likes one in particular, he follows her, braids her hair, and serenades to her with his silver guitar; but he also puts soil in her plate and she is not able to eat or sleep.

El Sombrerón appears at dusk, dragging along a group of mules carrying coal, with whom he travels around the city and its neighborhoods. When a woman responds to his love, he ties the mules to the house's pole where she lives, unhooks his guitar, and starts singing and dancing. Some residents from the neighborhoods of La Recolección and Parroquia Vieja say he still wanders at nights when there is a full moon.

El Sombrerón is one of the most important legends of Guatemala, along with La Llorona, Cadejo, and Siguanaba.

== The Legend ==
In the neighborhood of La Recolección lived a young woman named Susana, daughter of a woman who owned a store. Susana was a very pretty girl, with long hair and big hazelnut eyes.

One night, when there was a full moon, she was on the balcony admiring the sky. Suddenly, a short character with a big hat and a guitar approached her. Her beauty amazed him. He began to sing her a song, but at that moment her parents found out she was outside and made her go back inside the house. Since that day, she was no longer able to sleep because this character appeared in the house or sang to her from the street. She could not eat, either, because every time she was served food, it was contaminated with soil.

Worried, her parents cut her hair and took it to the church so that the priest would put holy water on it and pray for her. A few days later, El Sombrerón stopped bothering her.

Culturally, the legend advises teenage girls to preserve the collective values of a society.

== Cultural influence ==
"Legend of El Sombrerón" is the title of one of the short stories in Guatemalan Nobel-prize winner Miguel Ángel Asturias' 1930 collection Legends of Guatemala.

In 1950, El Sombrerón became the subject of an eponymous film, one of the first films shot in Guatemala.
