= Leyendas de Guatemala =

1930 book by Miguel Ángel Asturias

- Cover of the 1930 first edition
- Author: Miguel Ángel Asturias
- Language: Spanish
- Subject: Guatemalan Origin Myth
- Genre: Legends
- Publisher: Ediciones Oriente
- Publication date: 1930
- Publication place: Guatemala

Leyendas de Guatemala (Legends of Guatemala, 1930) was the first book to be published by Nobel-prizewinning author Miguel Ángel Asturias. The book is a re-telling of Maya origin stories from Asturias's homeland of Guatemala. It reflects the author's study of anthropology and Central American indigenous civilizations, undertaken in France, at the Sorbonne where he was influenced by the European perspective.

The nature of oral tradition is evident in Leyendas de Guatemala, as shown in the dedication: “To my mother, who used to tell me stories.” This reflects the traditional character of the origin of the stories, in which Asturias takes collective memory to a higher level of awareness through his fictionalization.

In critic Jean Franco's description, the book "gave lyrical recreations of Guatemalan folklore many of which drew their inspiration from pre-Columbian and colonial sources".

The writing style of Leyendas de Guatemala is the product of a fortunate experiment, which established a structure that can be called poetic intuition, and a style which can be seen as a precursor to the future literary movement of magical realism. Leyendas de Guatemala can be read not only from an anthropological perspective, but also as an aesthetic experience that confirms the originality of the style.

The book was translated to English by Kelly Washbourne (bilingual edition, ISBN 978-1891270536).

== Plot summary ==
Leyendas de Guatemala is made up of a series of short stories, which transform the oral legends of popular culture into relevant textual manifestations.

=== Guatemala ===
Guatemala serves as the first introduction to the legends about the Central American nation bearing the same name. This story presents Guatemala as a palimpsest, in which the duality of past vs. present and the Maya-Quiché vs. the Spanish identities becomes prominent.

The story begins with a winding road and a cart approaching an unnamed city and focuses on a pair of goitered elders, Don Chepe and Niña Tina, who are laden with the country's heritage. To stitch together the legends that compose the rest of the book told by these elders, the character, “Cuco de los Sueños,” is introduced. The narrator then tells two anecdotes, one about Brother Pedro de Betancourt and another about Fray Payo Enriquez de Rivera. Both stories emphasize transformation and contrasting elements. Asturias' main argument is that Guatemala is a nation built on nations and that change is possible.

Asturias makes references to the main cities and sites of Guatemala, such as Guatemala City and Antigua, which were formed during the colonial era of Guatemala. He also mentions the Guatemalan sites of Quiriguá, Tikal, as well as Palenque and Copán, which although they are not part of modern-day Guatemala, were part of the "Maya Empire".

It is explained in this leyenda that the modern cities of Guatemala have been physically constructed upon previous colonial and indigenous cities, which creates an image of Guatemala as "a house of several levels" and gives legitimacy to the "unity of the Hispanic and Maya races". Asturias emphasizes that ancient cultures are preserved within these layers.

This first introduction is about the reinstitution of the past culture and lost traditions. As such, "Guatemala" can be understood as a personal declaration of its own aesthetic, since it is a text where, as in the buried and overlapping cities, everything is combined. This discursive strategy marks the complexity of Guatemalan identity that Asturias tried so fervently to understand and delineate in literary terms for most of his life.

Asturias presents himself at the end of the story. Upon arriving to the capital he exclaims, “Mi pueblo! Mi pueblo!” Thus it is argued that this first story reveals Asturias' feelings of nostalgia.

=== Ahora que me acuerdo ===
(Now That I Recall) This story serves as a second introduction and presents creation as an inseparable element of destruction. This is the first of seven legends that the figure Cuero de Oro will tell. Cuero de Oro is the mythical manifestation of our newcomer, pale-skinned narrator. This figure engages in a narrative interplay with don Chepe and doña Tina, who are also mysterious figures that represent the elders who tell the tales of Guatemala. These elders speak of a tree that destroys the notion of time.

"At the beginning of the narrative, the three initial paragraphs are in the present [tense], and then become the past tense once the story of Cuero de Oro (...) begins. This provokes a certain surprise, not to mention a certain (...) temporal confusion". That is to say, mysterious and almost magical elements enter within the context of this story.

The emphasis on the oral qualities of traditional story telling are also evident in this short story. The narrator is telling us about his journey, and his anguish during his delirious night. This narration is full of voices, for example as don Chepe and Niña Tina respond to Cuero de Oro's exhortation. Asturias even ends the tale with the final sentence: and the conversation ended. The textual interplay between Cuero de Oro and don Chepe and Niña Tina can also be interpreted as representative of a child who is searching for the roots of his identity, questioning those who have access to this knowledge of another (mythical) time and space.

=== Leyenda del Volcán ===
(Legend of the Volcano) Leyenda del Volcán teaches that destruction is always followed by rebirth, implying that Maya-Quiche culture can be reborn. It relates the origin of the people in Guatemala in "one day that lasted many centuries".

It begins with six men, three of whom appeared from the water and three of whom appeared from the wind. Asturias' emphasis on the number three throughout the legend is in reference to the number's importance in Nahuatl tradition. The three men from the water nourish themselves with stars and those from the wind walk through the forest like bird-men.

In addition to these men there are two gods, Cabrakán, who provokes earthquakes, and Hurakán, who is the giant of the winds and the spirit of the sky. Hurakán produces a tremor and all of the animals flee from the forest. One of the six men, who is named Nido (the word for "nest" in Spanish), is the only being that remains and is ordered by a trinity, consisting of a saint, white lily, and a child, to build a temple. Afterwards the trees begin to fill with nests, illustrating how this story exemplifies the process of renewal.

This legend narrates a clear struggle between religions. It contrasts Catholicism (e.g.: references to "little crosses" and the trinity) with the forces of Cabrakán and Hurakán, who represent Maya-Quiche religion.

=== Leyenda del Cadejo ===
(Legend of El Cadejo) Set in the seventeenth century, this legend illustrates the capacity humanity has to overcome oppression.

In the first paragraph we are presented with the protagonist, a beautiful novice at a convent who, with time, will later become Madre Elvira de San Francisco. This character changes names various times in the story. The next several paragraphs are dedicated to describing the ambiance of the convent that encircles her, subtly moulded by her emotional perspective. She is plagued by her braid because it incites the physical arousal of men. Eventually she becomes mortified, therefore cutting off her braid, which then turns into a snake. The snake coils around a candle, putting out its flame, and sending the man to hell. Preito shows how the Cadejo was "...born out of temptation and ready to haunt humanity until the end of time. Through the description of how Madre Elvira de San Francisco was able to rid herself of her braid, Asturias demonstrates how humanity possesses the means to liberate itself from the "yoke" which binds it, regardless of how oppressive it may be. In this story there are frequent images of death and dead bodies, as well as instances of magical happenings.

In the last paragraph of the story it is unclear whether or not Asturias indicates that the events were nothing more than a dream.

=== Leyenda de la Tatuana ===
(Legend of La Tatuana) This legend aims to describe ways in which humanity can and will regain its freedom. The legend is not about an almond tree, that is described as a "priest-tree". This tree guards the Maya traditions and recounts the passing of the years. The tree divides its soul between the four paths that one encounters before the underworld known as Xibalbá. These four paths are marked by different colors: green, red, white and black. Each portion of the soul embarks on a different path on which they each face temptations. The black road, which in Mayan tradition leads to the underworld, trades part of its soul with the merchant of Priceless Jewels, who then uses in exchange for the most beautiful slave. The slave escapes, and the character of the tree, searching for the missing part of his soul eventually finds her. The Inquisition then intervenes and sentences to kill them. In the end, the beautiful slave escapes the night via the magic of a boat tattooed on her arm by the tree. On the morning of the execution the only thing the guards find in the prison cell is an old almond tree.

In this legend, Father Almond Tree represents the Maya-Quiche civilization and the Inquisition represents a foreign power. This legend shows that "the soul is not at the mercy of external forces" and "therefore humans always have the means to recover their independence".

=== Leyenda del Sombrerón ===
(Legend of El Sombrerón)

In this legend, Asturias takes the idea of the child/demon, el Sombrerón, and explores it through a lens of magic; he creates a ball which appears and disappears, in which he encloses a Sombreron or devil.

The protagonist is a monk, who becomes tempted by a ball that bounces through his window into his cell. He find himself enthralled by the ball and even begins to wonder if it may be affiliated with the devil. He spends countless hours playing with the ball, and when he talks to a woman whose son had lost the ball, and feels pressured to return it, the neighbors claim he appeared to look like the devil. He then eventually throws the ball out his window, and the ball transforms into the Sombrerón. Thus again, Asturias is showing that humans "are capable to breaking the ties that bind them to the undesirable".

This legend, like Leyenda del Cadejo, corresponds to the Spanish colonial period in Guatemala, and is written in a simple colloquial tongue. It focuses on the Spanish and a Christian aspects of Guatemala and it takes place in the city of Antigua.

Sáenz asserted in his analysis that the ball that the monk enjoys and plays with symbolizes an ancient Maya ball game. Thus, in this legend Christian and Maya traditions are combined as the ball equates an element of Maya ritual, but also has the characteristics of a devil.

=== Leyenda del tesoro del Lugar Florido ===
(Legend of the Treasure of the Flowering Place) This legend takes place at the time when the Spanish conquistadors arrived in Guatemala, while the natives celebrate the end of a war. It is situated near the lake Lago de Atitlán, where the Tz'utujil people live. Near this lake is a volcano named Abuelo del Agua, which means "grandfather of the water". This volcano hides the treasure from the bordering tribes who escaped from the plundering of the Spanish. The legend begins at twilight, which, according to Sáenz, can be seen as a comparison to the decline of the indigenous civilization. The end of the war is announced and a night-long celebration of peace ensues among the aboriginal people in the story. There's a list of the squadrons of soldiers, and each one is distinguished by the colors of the feathers they wear. The head of the local Maya brings together those who are to be sacrificed. The moment of destruction begins as the priests exclaim ritual sentences to the volcano, while the Spaniards ("white men") approach. The tribes are terrified and flee to the lake to protect themselves against the invasion, leaving the treasure behind.

Out of all eight texts which compose the original first edition, this last one is the only one which is set in the pre-Hispanic era, even if it is set right at the moment of the arrival of the Spanish. Asturias contrasts the two cultures; he describes the natives as connected to the natural world (their arms green with plant blood) and associates them with abundance and a sense of richness (they had flowers, fruits, birds, beehives, feathers, gold and precious stones), while emphasizing the scarcity and want of the Europeans by repeating the preposition "without" over and over again in their context.

=== Los brujos de la tormenta primaveral ===
(The Wizards of the Spring Storm) This legend is an interpretation of the creation of the world by the work of gods, and contains many magical and symbolic elements. It is divided into six parts and it describes the mythological fights for the survival between the three kingdoms: animal, plant, and mineral. Juan Poye is the protagonist of the legend and is a "man-river" that symbolizes fertility and the living. When the humans forget the rules of love and act cruelly, the river becomes a source of punishment for the immoral humans. All that remains at the end of the legend is cities covered by the vegetation of the Quiché land. In this story Asturias creates a new magical language in which he mixes Maya and Judeo-Christian ideas of an apocalypse and combines them to create this Apocalypse of Juan.

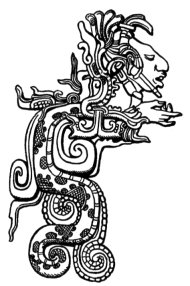
The Classic Maya vision of plumed serpent, as depicted at Yaxchilan.

=== Cuculcán ===
(alternate spelling: Kukulkan) This is the last story in Leyendas, and was written in the form of a play. It was added to the legends in the second edition. The three scenes are separated by colored curtains that indicate the passing of time; the curtain colors (yellow, red, and black) and scene changes follow the movement of the sun. The main characters are: Guacamayo, a bird of a thousand colors, who is deceitful, Cuculcán, or Plumed Serpent, and Chinchinirín, who is Cuculcán's warrior-attendant. Yaí is another character who is a "woman-flower" and is to be sacrificed. Guacamayo and Cuculcán dispute the legend of the sun, and behind his back, Guacamayo accuses him of being a fake, and argues with Chinchinirín. Finally, plotting to take Cuculcán's place, Guacamayo makes a deal with Yaí, but Cuculcán is saved. In the end the moon is born from Chinchinirín's body as he tries to reach Yellow Flower.

This final legend is a lucid re-elaboration on the Maya legend of the Plumed Serpent in order to permit an approach to the question of identity as a social construction. The tricky mirror which appears in the story (which confuses Guacamayo and Cuculcán about what is "real") is a metaphor for a brutal relativism which Asturias introduces in order to express the dual and complementary character of reality. That is to say Asturias presents the reality of an identity as dual, diglossic, and relative in the universe of Cuculcán, and applies this to the newly constructed, hybrid Guatemalan identity

== The author ==
Miguel Asturias was born in 1899 in Guatemala, and came from a middle-class background. His mother was a school teacher of a mixed background (Native American and Spanish), and his father, Ernesto Asturias, was a lawyer of Spanish background. Asturias initially attended law school, but went on to study anthropology and literature. He eventually became a Nobel Prize – winning author. He spent a significant portion of his studies in Paris, France, but also traveled around Latin America. His major works include Leyendas de Guatemala(1930), El Señor Presidente (1946), Hombres de Maíz (1949), Viento fuerte (1950), El Papa Verde (1954), Los ojos de los enterrados (1960), and Mulata de tal (1963).

== Literary analysis ==
Asturias bases his work on the traditions and legends of his ancestors and tries to provide an accurate representation of Native American culture, while mixing it with European colonial elements. He takes certain aspects of the traditional native culture “to demonstrate that the future of his country depends on the recognition and validation of the indigenous heritage”. His writing style is unique because he incorporates Western techniques with thematic and stylistic elements from indigenous literature, as well as combining oral and textual manners of narration. His uniqueness is further exemplified by the incapability to categorize his work in any one pre-existing genre of literature, although some claim Leyendas de Guatemala to be one of the precursors of the magical realism genre.

=== Form and structure ===
Each story in Leyendas is a poem in prose form, where every word matters, and in this manner it transcends a common collection of short stories. The tales are united by a strong common denominator: a shared plane of fiction. The initial legends are all in the form of a short story, but the last one, Cuculcán is in the form of a written play, originally meant for theater in Madrid.

Leyendas de Guatemala has two introductions: Guatemala and Ahora me acuerdo, which serve two distinct purposes. Ahora me acuerdo introduces a narrator who is quite identifiable with the author, while Guatemala sets up the universe in which the legends are going to take place.

Los brujos de la tormenta primaveral, and Cuculcàn were added to Leyendas de Guatemala in the second edition which came out in 1948. While initially they appear to break the formal unity of Leyendas (as Cuculcán is a piece which appears to be for theater), they follow the same stories and themes, and both appear to have been written prior to the publishing of the first edition of Leyendas.

The fluidity of Asturias' tales is a very important part of his literature. The short stories often sound musical, as if they were to be narrated orally, and the repetition of certain phrases facilitates this. An example is the repetition of El Cuco de los Sueños va hilando los cuentos.

=== Incorporation of indigenous culture ===
Asturias' fiction can be classified as neo-Indigenista. His work is an evolution from Indigenista literature; it is literature defined by its critical stance against the European domination of Native Americans, however, literature that is still bound to an exotic, stereotypical portrayal of Indigenous Peoples that either leaves them hopeless and dependent on Europeans or advocates change by becoming culturally mixed, mestizo. In contrast, Asturias rethinks his stance and depicts native culture as a continuing, and integral facet of Guatemala. To do this, Asturias tries to provide an accurate representation of indigenous culture and thus bases his work on traditions and legends of his ancestors. It can be argued that Asturias takes elements from the traditional culture “to demonstrate that the future of his country depends on the recognition and validation of the indigenous heritage”.

=== Identity ===
About the indigenous subject and modernity in Leyendas de Guatemala, author Frances Jaeger states that Asturias' Leyendas de Guatemala demonstrates how the study of myths from the past has helped form the national identity of Guatemala. Asturias' legends specifically represent the European and Maya worldviews that compose Guatemalan identity. Jaeger refers to the critic Lois Parkinson Zamora, who considers Leyendas de Guatemala to be a work that shows an "anxiety of [cultural] origins" that requires Asturias to feel the need to fill the void of knowledge of indigenous culture by looking to the past. This anxiety has led to the creation of a narrative full of detailed language, which incorporates the complexities and paradoxes of indigenous cultural origins. Essentially, the indigenous, the colonial, and the modern coexist equally in the legends. Jaeger's analysis emphasizes that Leyendas de Guatemala promotes a dialogue between the separate indigenous and European cultural influences in Guatemala, instead of furthering the notion of cultural hybridity or mestizaje. As society has evolved and technology has advanced, there has been a constant need to redefine indigenous culture in these changing contexts. In this way, the development of the Guatemalan nation, and the identity of its people, is shown through the telling of these various legends.

=== Magical realism ===
According to Francisco Solares-Larrave, the mythical thought process that characterizes the stories of Leyendas de Guatemala should be viewed not from an anthropological perspective, but rather as the root of a new take on reality which characterizes this literature. This implementation of a new kind of logic based in the realm of the mythical brings Asturias' stories close to the sphere of the literary concept of magical realism. However rather than classifying Leyendas as part of this movement of the Latin American Boom this makes these stories a precursor, a sort of a stepping stone towards the marvelous realism of Alejo Carpentier and later the magical realism movement. Asturias was more concerned with presenting the realistic qualities of magical things as a source of a new national identity rather than following what we now know as magical realism. Yet it is in Leyendas that we first begin to see traces of what will later be known as magical realism, a vision which unites reality with illusion. For example, with the appearance of the Cuco de los Sueños we see magical realism avant la lettre, which permits the evocation of cities of the past, those which are now buried under other cities. The apparent fluidity of time and space also invoke the sensation that the logic of magical realism had been brewing in the work of Asturias. Similarly, Selena Millares describes the world of Leyendas as watching the world through the reflection of a sub-terrain river With a regression to a dream-like quality and fluid context, Leyendas de Guatemala does indeed appear to be a significant stepping stone in the direction of the future movement of magical realism.

== Themes ==
=== The palimpsest model ===
In the very first legend, Asturias claims that Guatemala was constructed over buried cities, one over the other, like a house with many floors. In a figurative sense this is actually a true fact, as Guatemalan culture can be seen as superposed over a Mayan heritage, in the ruins of the arrival of the Spanish. Indeed, even the literal interpretation contains truth, as it was directly over the ruins of Palenque and Copán that the Spanish cities were raised, creating something like a stratified tower of Babel.

We may conjecture that the intent [of the actual form of the book] of Leyendas de Guatemala could have been to clearly emphasize the idea that between two introductory texts, the “legends” make up the central body of the book, and as such are “buried” (same as “the cities) and are for that reason a product of an indispensable cultural remembrance.

The reason that Asturias presents Guatemala in this model of a palimpsest (a new culture imposed upon an older one which also sits atop an even older one, etc.) is to make the point that in order to understand Guatemalan identity fully and in its entirety, one must combine all these levels and unite them as parts of a common Guatemalan narrative. This corresponds with Asturias' aim to use Leyendas in order to reinvent Guatemalan identity.

=== The hybrid identity ===
Hybridity refers to modern Guatemalan identity as a mixture of Mayan and European cultures.

Before the publication of Leyendas, the subject of a hybrid identity was mostly presented in a negative light. Even many years later with books such as Maladrón (1967), they [persons of mixed blood] were portrayed as vile, thieving characters. However, with Leyendas, Asturias wanted to reevaluate these subjects, who have previously been marginalized or even invisible. He does so by uniting native and European elements in the stories.

The legends of el Sombrerón, Tatuana and Cadejo existed in Mayan myth, but el Tesoro del Lugar Florido is certainly a new addition. But Asturias mixes these elements not only from one tale to the next, but even within each legend; for example in the first tale the narrator is engaged in a native song and dance ritual, but what he sings are the vowels of the Latin alphabet, a-e-i-o-u. Also in Leyenda del Volcan, Asturias combined the original mythology of the flying beings which populated the land with calling it the land of trees, which is what those allied with the conquistadors had called Guatemala. Another example of such balancing is the legend of Sombrerón, which takes an original Mayan myth and re-tells it through a post-colonial Catholic lens. In this sense, Leyendas can be viewed as a reaction against racial purification and in favor of a cultural conciliation represented by the hybrid identity, achieving this via balancing popular tradition with the presence of the pre-Hispanic world.

=== Gender ===
Relations of gender are presented as analogous to relations of power in Leyendas, but it appears as something ambiguous and almost fluid. The two elders introduced in the very first legends, Don Chepe and Niña Tina, are identical to each other, despite the fact that one is male and the other female. There is no difference in their power or in their gender, and they could be one entity, but they are indeed two, distinguished only by their names. Cuculcán himself is masculine, but his experience is feminine. Symbolically the Latin American image establishes a binarism in the power relations between the Spanish hegemony of masculinity, while associating the indigenous sub-alternity with the feminine. This transference of gender presents itself various times in Leyendas. For example, Cuero de Oro (in Ahora me acuerdo) presents the forest as a woman, but he is indeed the forest. Therefore, he becomes a woman in a passive role. Generally Asturias equates relations of gender to relations of power throughout Leyendas de Guatemala, presenting femininity as a repressed presence. In Leyenda del Sombrerón, whenever the ball (symbol of temptation and in a way of evil) is alluded to, the diminutive and the feminine gender are used.

== Influences ==
=== European influences ===
Asturias studied in Paris from 1924 until 1933, which enabled him to observe Guatemala, his home country, from a distance. Here he studied Mayan culture with Georges Renaud, who, as his director, had a significant influence over his literary development. The teachings of Renaud in particular, constituted for Asturias the revelation of a forgotten cultural root, previously unknown, and almost "undervalued".

The First edition of Legends of Guatemala was published along with an extremely important piece of information, stating that the author was in "Paris, 1925–1930". This indication of time and place marks an epoch of aesthetic and ideological maturation in his literary experience. At 25 years of age, Asturias had marched to Guatemala to reshape his own national identity and establish a personal connection with the written word.

His time in Paris also introduced Asturias to surrealism. Asturias' writings are influenced by the surrealist movement, which becomes most evident in his use of opposing and incongruous objects. Prieto contends that "a surrealist uses opposites to gain an openness to the world that will allow them to perceive the marvelous"; in this context, the marvelous is explained as meaning that "this" is also "that". In Asturias' application, this translates into the claim that "Guatemala cannot deny its roots even if the class in power refuses to recognize it."

=== Latin American influences ===
Of course, the process of becoming aware of cultural hybridization had begun before his arrival in Paris. The trip to Mexico that Asturias took in 1921 to the International Congress of Students, organized by the Mexican Federation of Students with the participation of José Vasconcelos, would be a definitive influence on Asturias’ ideas about mestizo cultures.

Equally important was Asturias' involvement with the French-based Latin Press Agency, or Prensa Latina, an activist group which fought for the "revitalization of 'Latin' power". In March 1928, Asturias voyaged to Havana, Cuba and fulfilled an important role as a participant in the Prensa Latina congress. In this city, which made an impression upon him as the "activist crossroads" of the world, he came into contact with members of the Cuban avant-garde movement. The time spent in both France and Cuba introduced him to significant contacts and enabled Asturias to rethink the origins and identity of his country incorporating Mayan-Quiché culture. Consequently, Asturias began to revise his opinion of the indigenous culture drastically. A rapid transformation in his work is seen when comparing Asturias's dissertation, "El problema social del indio", written in the 1920s, which "focused on the concept of the mestizaje or the support of foreign immigration to regenerate the Indian, and reeks with prejudices". to Leyendas de Guatemala, in the 1930s, where Asturias values and admires the culture. Asturias goes so far to "cast himself the role of spokesman" for the Native Americans.

Of all the books Asturias had read, the book La tierra del faisán y del venado (The Land of the Pheasant and the Deer) by Antonio Mediz Bolio is considered to be the most direct antecedent of Leyendas de Guatemala. Bolio fabricated an imagined country using fictive literature in which he mixed Mayan folk tales with elements of Hispanic modernism, much like what Asturias did later in 1930.

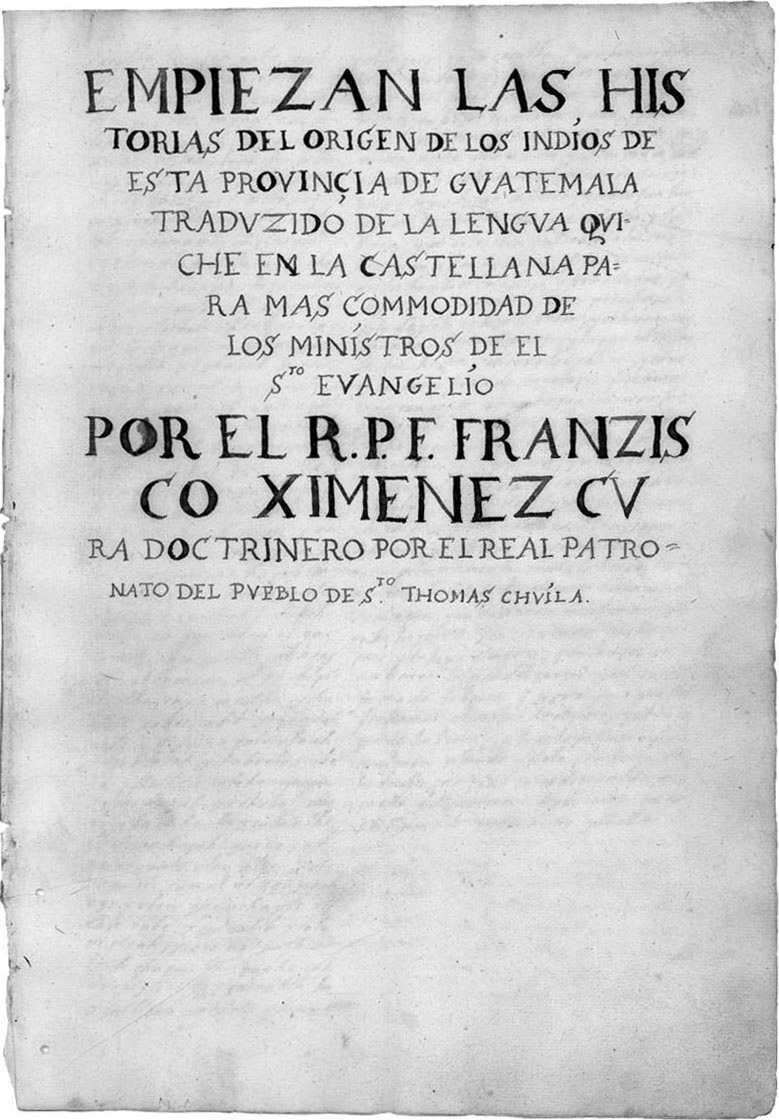
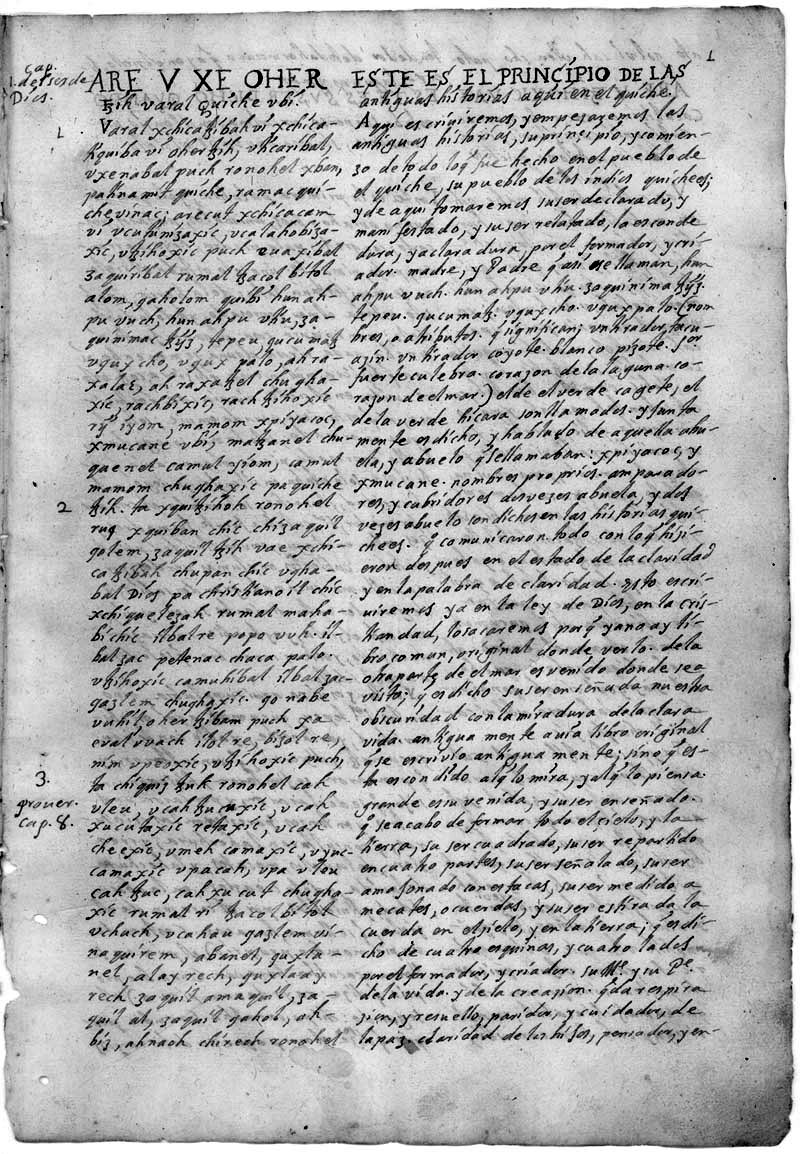
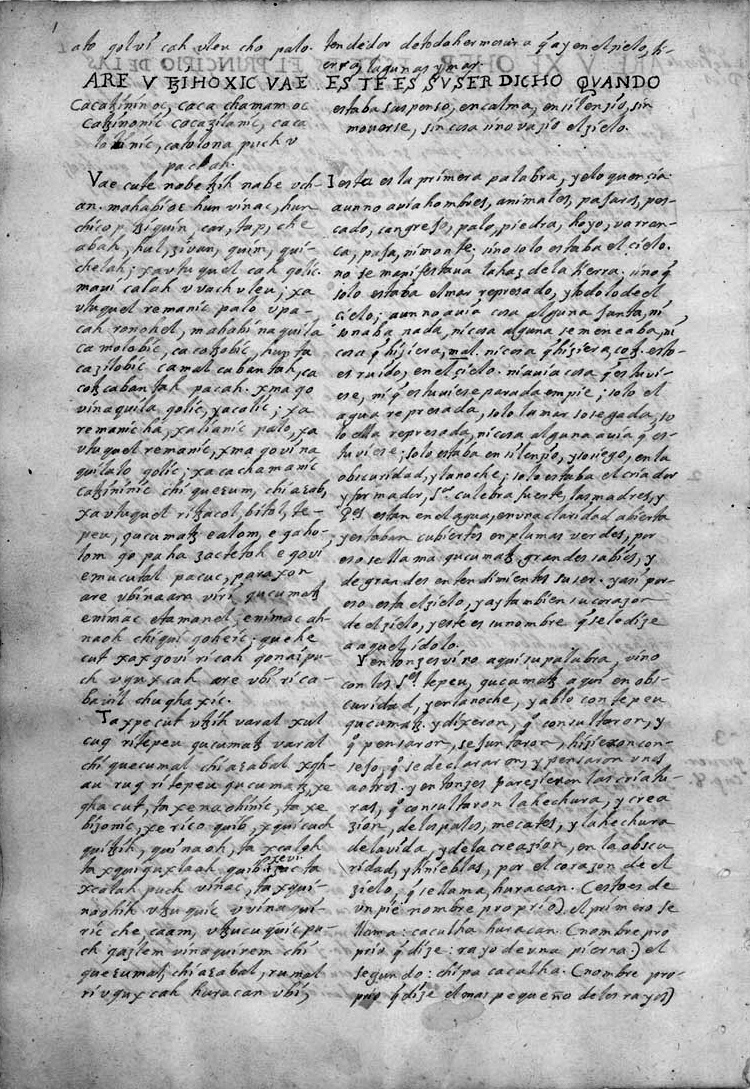
Father Ximénez's manuscript contains the oldest known text of Popol Vuh. It is mostly written in parallel Quiché and Spanish as in the front and rear of the first folio pictured here.

==== Maya-Quiché influences ====
For Asturias, a legend is a cultural artifact in a state of constant change. Wanting to be part of this change, Asturias took popular and well-known legends and modified them, combining elements, and morphing some parts beyond recognition.

Leyendas de Guatemala is largely based on Popol Vuh, an ancient text containing Mayan folklore tales. In 1927, Asturias, in collaboration with José María Gonzáles de Mendoza, worked on the translation of Popol Vuh, and as such became immersed in its legends. For example, "La leyenda de Tatuana" is based on the Quiché legend of Chimalmat, but re-written to incorporate the pre-Hispanic myth with the new anecdotes and characters of the colonial era.

However some scholars argue that what really inspired Asturias is the evolution of a hybrid, mixed-race nation, which needed a set of new and revised creation stories. This can be supported by the fact that he dedicated the book to his mother, who was also of mixed ancestry.

== Criticism and reception ==
Asturias has been described as a "poet-author" whose unique literary abilities have created a narrative of the evolution of Guatemala in a way that traverses the boundaries of a poem, story, legend or work of prose.

After the book's publication in 1930, it was translated into French by Francis de Miomandre and won the Sylla Monsegur award. This translation also succeeded in gaining the admiration of Paul Valéry, who wrote a letter about Leyendas de Guatemala that has been used as a prologue to the book in certain editions.

Heninghan critiques the book, claiming that it courts a European audience because the exoticism of Guatemala that conforms to the Parisian expectation. Therefore, Henighan thinks that Leyendas de Guatemala is both genuine and fake; Asturias' accomplishment in creating the illusion of fiction was entirely stimulated by the perceived expectation of the French audience. According to such interpretations, the book is based in French Orientalist fantasies. However, Henighan claims that "Leyendas de Guatemala deforms the Orientalist assumption because here the 'explorer' transmitting the magical world back to the Parisian readers is a native Guatemalan himself". He says that Asturias uses strategies to persuade the validity and trustworthiness of his writing to the European audience he targets; this is the reason he included pictures, the introductory preface by Paul Valéry, impersonal narration, and disclaimers such as 'that no one believes the legends of the past'.

Henighan also argues that the introduction which presents Guatemala as a palimpsest of past civilizations produces an inherent subordination of Guatemala to Europe. Henighan's main argument is that the book presents a clash between Guatemala and Europe, and this mirrors Asturias' own conflict of identity. He says "Guatemala" focuses on alienation while "Ahora que me acuerdo" ends with confusion of estrangement from these myths. The five legends attempt to reconcile the tensions embodied in the books double introduction. "Syncretism, doubleness, and heterogeneity are portrayed as inevitable human conditions" in the legends. He says that Asturias wants to demonstrate the impossibility of maintaining some kind of purity of identity. Thus existence of mestizaje, both racial and cultural seems to be unavoidable and desirable. The clash of cultural identity reaches its climax in the final story, "here the dynamics of doubleness becomes permeated with questions of cultural power." He contends that Asturias becomes aware that the two cultures will always collide and that "the weaker culture will always be subjugated by the cultural dictates of the stronger." The conquistadors caused a volcanic eruption and both groups became divided, yet not equal. Therefore, this story represents Asturias accepting his Parisian self.

Asturias received much criticism for his earlier essay "El problema social del indio" (1923), which saw no future for a Guatemalan identity based on its Mayan heritage, and encouraged a progressive ideology to take over. The criticism comes from the complete change of attitude which Leyendas de Guatemala seems to convey. Martin Lienhard argues that this former essay has become a dark spot in Asturias' past, which everyone seems to have forgotten once the author received the Nobel Prize for Literature in 1967. He goes on to argue that the young Asturias made undeniably racist claims in this essay, which cannot be deleted, and Leyendas de Guatemala does not entirely break from such an attitude either. Lienhard compares the way in which Asturias re-wrote the creation myths of Guatemala to that of Soviet educational propaganda, claiming that he progressively manipulated the culture and the collective memory of a people to serve the interest of a State.

== See also ==
- Miguel Ángel Asturias – Author of Leyendas de Guatemala
- Magical Realism – Related literary movement
- Popol Vuh – Original collection of Maya creation stories
- Guatemala – An overview of the country and its history
