= Efraín Recinos =

Guatemalan architect, urbanist, and sculptor (1928–2011)

Efraín Enrique Recinos Valenzuela
- Born: May 15, 1928; Quetzaltenango, Guatemala
- Died: October 2, 2011 (aged 83); Ciudad de Guatemala, Guatemala
- Education: Universidad de San Carlos de Guatemala
- Known for: Architect, muralist, painter, professor
- Awards: Orden del Quetzal

Efraín Enrique Recinos Valenzuela (May 15, 1928 – October 2, 2011) was a Guatemalan contemporary architect, muralist, urbanist, painter and sculptor. Recinos' works adorn the facades and interiors of many of Guatemala's landmark buildings, being best known for his work in the National Theater of Guatemala. However, he is best known as the architect of the Centro Cultural Miguel Ángel Asturias, which serves as the county's national theater and largest cultural complex, opened in 1978. Recinos designed the large, white structure set on a hill to resemble a jaguar, using inspiration from more traditional Mayan motifs. The government considers the theater as a National Heritage site.

Recinos painted the murals located in the Guatemalan National Music Conservatory. Other examples of his work can be found inside La Aurora International Airport and the National Mortgage building. The government of Guatemala awarded him the Order of the Quetzal, one of the country's highest honors for his artistic contributions during his career. Recinos was born in Quetzaltenango, Guatemala, in 1928. He died at the Hospital Hermano Pedro in Guatemala City on October 2, 2011, at the age of 83. He had been treated for an ulcer.

== Early life ==
Efrain Recinos was born into an unusual and humble family in Quetzaltenango. His father was a painter, wood sculptor and enjoyed playing music, especially marimba. He did not send Recinos to school at an early age since he thought other kids would be a bad influence for him. Instead, he taught Recinos how to read and write. Consequentially, and because his family moved constantly, Recino's best friend was his pencil and he started drawing.

At age 5 he started drawing monsters, war, and soldiers. These drawings were likely representations of what Guatemala was going through at that time since the dictator Jorge Ubico was in power. At age 7 he could read and write with ease and started to play marimba, violin, and the mandolin. By age 9 he started learning and painting oil landscapes. Finally, at age 12, his father enrolled him at Escuela Costa Rica de Quetzaltenango where he completed his primary studies. He was then enrolled at the Escuela Nacional de Artes Plásticas "Rafael Rodríguez Padilla", where he studied drawing and sculpture. He was critiqued and often yelled at due to his young age compared to his other classmates.

During his teenage years, between 1946 and 1950, he used to make portraits for the ladies he was attracted to. In this manner, he met Elsa his future wife. He then went to the Instituto Nacional Central para Varones, where he finished his mid-level studies. In 1952 he got accepted to the Universidad de San Carlos de Guatemala Faculty of Engineering since the faculty of architecture did not exist. He finished top of his class in 1953 and graduated in 1956 in Architecture.

== Career ==
Recinos started to make a name for himself with his murals. His early murals were commissions for schools and small buildings. His first big project was the murals for Parque de la Industria, in 1961. The site was a space for conventions, concerts, and other events. In 1966, Recinos got a commission for the new national mortgage loans building (Credito Hipotecario Nacional). The work was carved on the exterior concrete walls in which abstraction and the history of exchange were predominant. The building stands out from the rest in the civic center. The year after, 1967, he got a commission for the national library (Biblioteca Nacional). Recinos decided to make the mural outside rather than inside since he wanted to make a parallel between the quietness from inside the library and the urban noise form outside. The mural portrayed the everyday life of a typical Guatemalan however, some got censored.

After the 1944 Guatemalan Revolution, an ancient Spanish building was destroyed. The building was located on a hill near the center of the city. The site was then used for different events and even as a disco for some years. Beginning in 1962, Recinos started making murals on the outside gardens and created an outside theater. Finally, in 1970, the Guatemalan government demolished the main building and gave Recinos the task to design the Teatro Nacional (national theater) there. Recino's main goal was to create a place that represented all Guatemalans. The building is inspired by ancient Mayan pyramids and Guatemalan volcanos and resembles a sitting jaguar from the side. Recinos also wanted to create a place that was alive and filled with art both inside and outside the building. The site was named Centro Cultural Miguel Ángel Asturias, in honor of Nobel Prize winner Miguel Ángel Asturias. His biggest project was completed in 1978 and is now considered one of the finest pieces of architecture in Latin America.

The murals of the Conservatory Germán Alcántara were created by Recinos. The Acoustic Diffusers as Recinos called them, had a very important purpose and that was to improve the acoustic and give architectonic solidity in the area that no side stages were built and an homage for the Guatemalan artists that performed in this stage, placing in unreal side stages, unreal audiences formed by distinguished artists.

== Censored murals ==
During the 1950-60s, dictatorships, depression, and violence were recurring in Guatemala. Due to many factors, a 30-year civil war erupted costing the lives of more than 300,000 Guatemalans. Many intellectuals and artists expressed their discomfort and anger thorough art, including Recinos. However, a lot of artists fled the country due to censorship by the government. Recinos was one of the few that stayed.

In his paintings, sculptures and public works, he exposed the social issues that were happening. Some examples of his discomfort can be seen in his painting "Estado de Sitio" and his sculpture "Presidenta Cuartelazo". Recinos tried to do a mural at the Biblioteca Nacional (national library), but weeks after he started working the Ministerio de Comunicaciones y Obras Públicas (ministry of communication and public works) allowed him to keep working but censored some content. Later in 1979, he tried to make it again by working in the basement. However, after six months, a minister heard about the project and ordered it to be shut down. Shortly after his work disappeared.

== Description of art ==
Throughout his 30-year career, Recinos kept a unique style in his painting, sculpture and architecture. Recino's style was first inspired by Antonio Gaudi in his sculpture and painting, and Frank Lloyd Wright in his architecture. His style has often been described with one word, integration. Taking elements from many art forms and making them into one, as well as using different materials. In many of his creations, Recinos mixed ancient Mayan glyphs with elements taken from contemporary iconography. Recinos also added his own mystic characters to many of his works, which he saw in his dreams or visions. His most famous and iconic character is "La Guatemalita". The character is stylized with a feminine form, her figure is inspired by the map of Guatemala. It became an artistic symbol and with its distinctive style, little by little it became a representation of the essence of all Guatemalans. In his paintings, a vocation towards the baroque stacked characters and recreations of the national landscape. That same sense of interior and exterior baroque translated into his sculptures, using different materials like lacquer oils, varnishes, iron, concrete, plexiglass, everything the artist founded in hand.

== Major works ==
- Murales del Parque de la Industria, 1961.
- Esculturas de la Fuente del parque de la Industria, 1961.
- Monumento de la Industria, 1961.
- Teatro al Aire Libre, 1962–1967.
- Murales del Crédito Hipotecario Nacional, 1963.
- Murales de la Biblioteca Nacional, 1967.
- Murales interiores y exteriores de la Terminal Aérea, 1968.
- Parques del Centro Cultural, 1967–1970.
- Teatro Nacional, 1970–1978.
