= Men of Maize =

1949 novel by Miguel Ángel Asturias

- First edition
- Author: Miguel Ángel Asturias
- Original title: Hombres de maíz
- Language: Spanish
- Publisher: Losada
- Publication date: 1949
- Publication place: Guatemala
- English publication date: 1975 (Delacorte)
- Media type: Print

Men of Maize (Spanish: Hombres de maíz) is a 1949 novel by Guatemalan Nobel Prize in Literature winner Miguel Ángel Asturias. The novel is usually considered to be Asturias's masterpiece, yet remains one of the least understood novels he wrote. The title Hombres de maíz refers to the Maya belief that flesh was made of corn. Its title originates in the Popol Vuh, one of the sacred books of the Maya. The English translation is part of the UNESCO Collection of Representative Works.

== Plot ==
The novel is written in six parts, each exploring the contrast of Indigenous customs and a progressive, modernizing society.

Asturias's book explores the magical world of Indigenous communities, a subject which the author was both passionate and knowledgeable of. The novel draws on traditional legend, but the story is of Asturias's own creation. The plot revolves around an isolated community (the men of maize or "people of corn") whose land is under threat by outsiders, with the intent of commercial exploitation. An example leader, Gaspar Ilom, leads the community's resistance to the planters, who kill him in the hope of thwarting the rebellion. Beyond the grave Ilom lives on as a "folk-hero"; despite his efforts, the people still lose their land. In the second half of the novel, the central character is a postman, Nicho, and the story revolves around his search for his lost wife. In the course of his quest he abandons his duties, tied as they are to "white society", and transforms himself into a coyote, which represents his guardian spirit. This transformation is yet another reference to Mayan culture; the belief of nahualism, or a man's ability to assume the shape of his guardian animal, is one of the many essential aspects to understanding the hidden meanings in the novel. Through allegory, Asturias shows how European imperialism dominates and transforms native traditions in the Americas. By the novel's end, as Jean Franco notes, "the magic world of Indian legend has been lost"; but it concludes on a "Utopian note," as the people become ants to transport the maize they have harvested.

Written in the form of a myth, the novel is experimental, ambitious, and difficult to follow. For instance, its "time scheme is a mythic time in which many thousands of years may be compressed and seen as a single moment", and the book's language is also "structured so as to be analogous to Indian languages". Because of its unusual approach, it was some time before the novel was accepted by critics and the public.

== Plot introduction ==
The novel deals with the conflict between two types of men: the ones who consider maize to be a sacred food (the indigenous people of Guatemala); and those who view it simply as a commercial product. It exposes the devastating effects capitalism and international companies had on the lives of Guatemalan maize growers, having a profound effect on their customs, ancestral beliefs and cultural identity. The novel is generally considered to be part of the literary genre known as Magic Realism. As such, it delves into the richness of native culture and oral tradition and touches themes such as: myths and legends, songs, native wisdom and lore, nahualism, magic and animal spirits.

== See also ==
- Literature of Guatemala
