= Selena Millares =

Spanish writer and professor

Selena Millares (born Las Palmas de Gran Canaria, 1963) is a Spanish writer and professor.

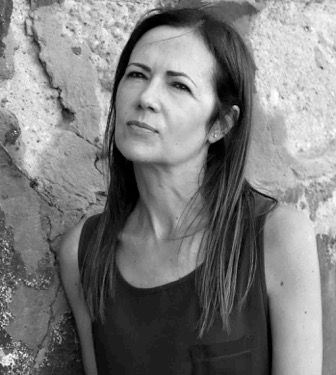
Selena Millares

She was born in Las Palmas de Gran Canaria and got her Ph.D. in Literature at the Universidad Complutense de Madrid. She has lived in Minneapolis, Paris, Berlin, Santiago de Chile and Alghero. Since 1996, she is a professor at the Universidad Autónoma de Madrid. She is the author of numerous essays as well as creative works (poetry, prose, painting), which suggest an interdisciplinary dialogue and the return to the original humanism, based on the integral conception of art and thought.

== Awards ==
- 2013, International Poetry Award of the city of Sassari, Italy.
- 2014, International Literature Award Antonio Machado, Collioure, France.

== Works ==
- Páginas de arena (poetry), 2003
- Isla del silencio (poetry), 2004
- Cuadernos de Sassari (poetry), 2013
- Sueños del goliardo (poetry and painting), 2013
- Isla y sueño (catalogue and poetry), 2014
- El faro y la noche (novel), 2015

== Essays ==
- La maldición de Scheherazade, 1997
- Rondas a las letras de Hispanoamérica, 1999
- Neruda: el fuego y la fragua, 2008
- La revolución secreta, 2010
- De Vallejo a Gelman, 2011
- Prosas hispánicas de vanguardia, 2013
