= Jordi Rubió =

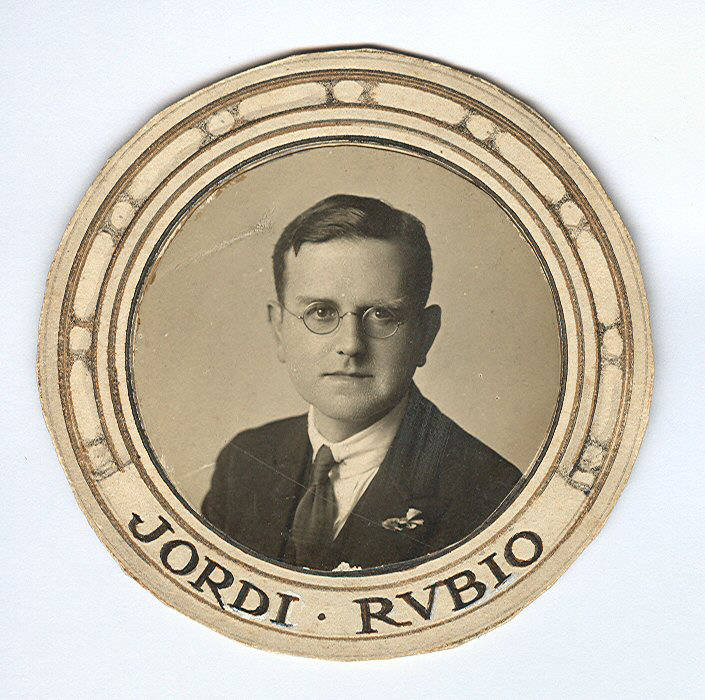

Jordi Rubió i Balaguer (Catalan: [ˈʒɔrði ruβiˈo j βələˈɣe]; 1887 in Barcelona – 1982 in Barcelona) was a Catalan philologist and librarian.

== Some works ==
- La lògica en rims del Gazzali glosada en rims per Ramon Llull (1914)
- De l'Edat mitjana al Renaixement: Figures literàries de Catalunya i València (1948)
- Obres essencials de Ramon Llull (1957-1960)
- La cultura catalana del Renaixement a la Decadència (1964), recull d'articles
- Documentos para la Historia de la Universidad de Barcelona. I. Preliminares (1289-1451)
- Il·lustració i Renaixença (1987)
- Llibreters i impressors a la Corona d'Aragó (1994)
