= Samira Azzam =

Palestinian author

- Born: 13 September 1927 Acre, Mandatory Palestine
- Died: 8 August 1967 (aged 39)
- Occupation: Writer; broadcaster; educator
- Genre: Short stories
- Subject: Palestinian identity

Samira Azzam (Arabic: سميرة عزام) (13 September 1927 – 8 August 1967) was a Palestinian writer, broadcaster, and translator known for her collections of short stories. In 1948, Azzam fled Palestine with her husband and family in the Nakba. Her collections of stories are renowned for examining the entirety of the Palestinian identity during this time period. Her first set of short stories, Small Things, was published in 1954, and examined women's role in Palestinian society. After returning to Beirut in 1959, she examined other Palestinian social structures such as the class hierarchy. She published two more collections of short stories during her life, The Great Shadow and The Clock and the Man. Throughout her writing, she does not cast blame as to the cause of these social structures, but rather creates plot lines that characterize these different sub-cultures within Palestinian society, relating them to political situation of this historical period. Therefore, her writing creates a very holistic view of Palestinian national identity during this time in history.

== Life ==
Samira Azzam was born into a Christian Orthodox family in Acre, in Mandatory Palestine. She attended elementary school in Acre and high school in Haifa at "Takmilyet Al-Rahibat." before becoming a school teacher at age 16. During this time, she began writing articles for a Palestinian newspaper under the alias “Coastal Girl.” In 1948, Azzam and her family were relocated to Lebanon due to the 1948 Palestinian expulsion and flight. Azzam left her family after two years to become the headmistress of an all girls school in Iraq. It was in Iraq that she began her career as a radio broadcaster for the Near East Asia Broadcasting Company. First, she wrote for the program “Women's Corner” before being moved to Beirut by the broadcasting station, where she was the head of the program “With the Morning.”. Her voice became a regular presence in the lives of many Arabs, making her writing all the more powerful.

On 24 December 1959, Azzam married Adib Yousef Hasan. They returned to Iraq for a short period of time. However, they had to leave when the monarchy fell, and the new republic accused Azzam's broadcasts of being hostile towards it. Upon her return to Beirut, she began writing for numerous women's publications as well as translating English classics into Arabic. She became extremely politically active in the 1960s.

She died of a heart attack on 8 August 1967.

== Writing and major themes ==
=== Bread of Sacrifice ===
Samira Azzam’s short story titled Bread of Sacrifice is a poignant tale set in the city of Acre. Although it is a work of fiction, the author draws on historical events and experiences making the story resonate with the “Nakba generation”- Palestinians who were displaced from their homes in 1948.

The story follows a young soldier Ramiz and a nurse Su’ad working in the Arab legion. They meet when their shifts coincide at a hospital in Acre. Although they do like each other, it is not a typical love-story. Su’ad asserts her own agency multiple times throughout the story, even telling Ramiz at one point that although she loved him, he was not everything for her. Azzam’s writing of Su’ad makes the character very realistic as a woman who wants and does things not simply for a man but for herself. By including a character such as Su’ad, Azzam shows a glimpse of the many women who were part of the Palestinian struggle.

In particular, Azzam describes the developments in Haifa to foreshadow the impending doom on Acre. In 1948, Haifa fell to the Zionists after the British forces evacuated the port town earlier than planned. According to the story, Palestinians fleeing the violence flocked to Acre in boats. The consequent violent episodes cause many to flee Acre and neighboring areas fearing for their lives. Su’ad is one of the few civilians who refuses to leave much to the frustration of her brother.

Su’ad stays in her city and brings food every couple of days for Ramiz and his comrades. However, as the fighting gets closer and closer, Su’ad gets shot on her way to give food. The ending of the story is Ramiz’s dilemma on whether he and his comrades should consume the bread that is soaked with Su’ad’s blood. While he ponders upon the value of her sacrifice, many questions are raised. Although Su’ad has sacrificed her life to feed the soldiers, would consuming her blood be righteous? Azzam puts forward a rather disturbing situation that no individual would want to face. Yet it is such uncomfortable situations that many Palestinians may have grappled with during the Nakba.

=== Major Themes ===
Much of Azzam's writing revolved around the Palestinian experience in the diaspora. Major themes in her works included precision and control; her stories often revolved around a specific action or choice. (Jayyusi) Azzam's first collection of short stories, titled Little Things, was published in 1954. Throughout this collection, characters struggle and, in many cases, fail in their endeavors, often because they lack a sense of identity or purpose. In her story "Because He Loved Them," Azzam portrays a hardworking farmer who loses everything in the 1948 exodus. He is then reduced to peasant status, turning to alcohol for comfort. The story ends with him murdering his wife in a drunken rage. Throughout the story, he is not characterized as evil or vengeful, but rather a man of noble character who was so affected by losing everything he loved that he made poor decisions.

Azzam developed an extensive commentary on women in society, especially in her early writing, as she often critiques societal patriarchy and the restriction of female agency in Palestinian society. "Bread of Sacrifice," one of Azzam's many notable stories, depicts the experiences of Palestinian fighters and civilians fighting in Acre Palestine during the Nakba. The story centers on Ramiz, a Palestinian fighter, and Su'ad, a nurse who supports Ramiz and his comrades. Ultimately, Su'ad decides to remain in Acre during the conflict to support the fighters, where she is tragically killed in an attempt to bring food to the fighters. The story explores themes of love, sacrifice, the harsh realities of war, as well as the agency of women in Palestine. Azzam does not blame the struggles women face on oppression by men, she attributes them to society as a whole. This commentary is also developed in "Because He Loved Them." Azzam blamed the wife's murder on the circumstances surrounding her husband rather than the husband himself, with the wife a "victim of circumstance." Her feminist narrative style represents a departure from strict realism, a departure that has continued and is becoming increasingly prevalent in feminist literature.

Although Azzam initially masked her political views in her writing, it became increasingly obvious that her stories were an allegory for Palestinian political struggles. Her views on these struggles also surfaced, sometimes overpowering the artistic value of the story. In her story "On the Way to Solomon's Pools," Azzam tells the story of a village teacher who single-handedly tries to take down the encroaching Israeli forces. Though ultimately unsuccessful, his struggle represents the Palestinian fight for survival, even when faced with insurmountable opposition. He then buries his only son in the soil under a tree. This action represents the ever-present feeling of hope within the Palestine people that one day, their home will belong to them again.

Many of the motifs found in her stories stem from the struggles Azzam faced throughout her life. Her heroines are largely independent, many of whom work, just as Azzam did from an early age. Many of them are responsible for supporting their family and appreciate the value of money and the comfort it allows them. Her characters are generally viewed as realistic, even by contemporary critics. She focused on struggles faced by common people, though she did not belong to this demographic herself.

Throughout the 1960s, much of her efforts were put toward drafting a novel, which she reportedly destroyed upon hearing of the Arabs' defeat during the Six-Day War in 1967. The novel was titled Sinai Without Borders. Two volumes of her stories were published posthumously.

== Works ==
- Little Things (1954 – stories)
- The Great Shadow (1956 – stories)
- And Other Stories (1960 – stories)
- The Clock and the Man (1963 – stories)
- The Festival Through the Western Window (1971 – stories)
- Echoes (2000 – stories)
