= Mulata de tal =

1963 novel by Miguel Ángel Asturias

- The cover of the first edition
- Author: Miguel Ángel Asturias
- Language: Spanish
- Published: 1963 by Losada
- English publication date: 1967
- Media type: Print (Hardback & Paperback)
- Pages: 280 pp
- OCLC: 1145805
- Dewey Decimal: 863.6
- LC Class: PQ7499.A75

Mulata de tal (A Kind of Mulatto) is a novel by Nobel Prize-winning novelist Miguel Ángel Asturias. Asturias published this novel while he and his wife were living in Genoa in 1963.

Within a few years of publication, this novel emerged as a major work. A review in the journal Ideologies and Literature described it as "a carnival incarnated in the novel. It represents a collision between Mayan Mardi Gras and Hispanic baroque."

The plot revolves around the battle of Celestino Yumi, a Guatemalan peasant, and his wife Catalina Zabala to prevail over a mulatto woman named Mulata (likened to the Moon) who has ensnared Yumi and toyed with Catalina. Yumí and Catalina become experts in sorcery and are criticized by the Church for their practices. The novel uses Mayan mythology and Catholic tradition to form a distinctive allegory of belief.

Gerald Martin in the Hispanic Review commented that it is "sufficiently obvious that the whole art of this novel rests upon its language. In general, Asturias matches the visual freedom of the cartoon by using every resource the Spanish language offers him. His use of color is striking and immeasurably more liberal than in earlier novels." Asturias built the novel by this unique use of color, liberal theory, and his distinctive use of the Spanish language. His novel also received the Silla Monsegur Prize for the best Spanish-American novel published in France.
