= Centro Cultural Miguel Ángel Asturias =

Coordinates: 14°37′37.52″N 90°31′04.23″W

Teatro Nacional Centro Cultural Miguel Ángel Asturias
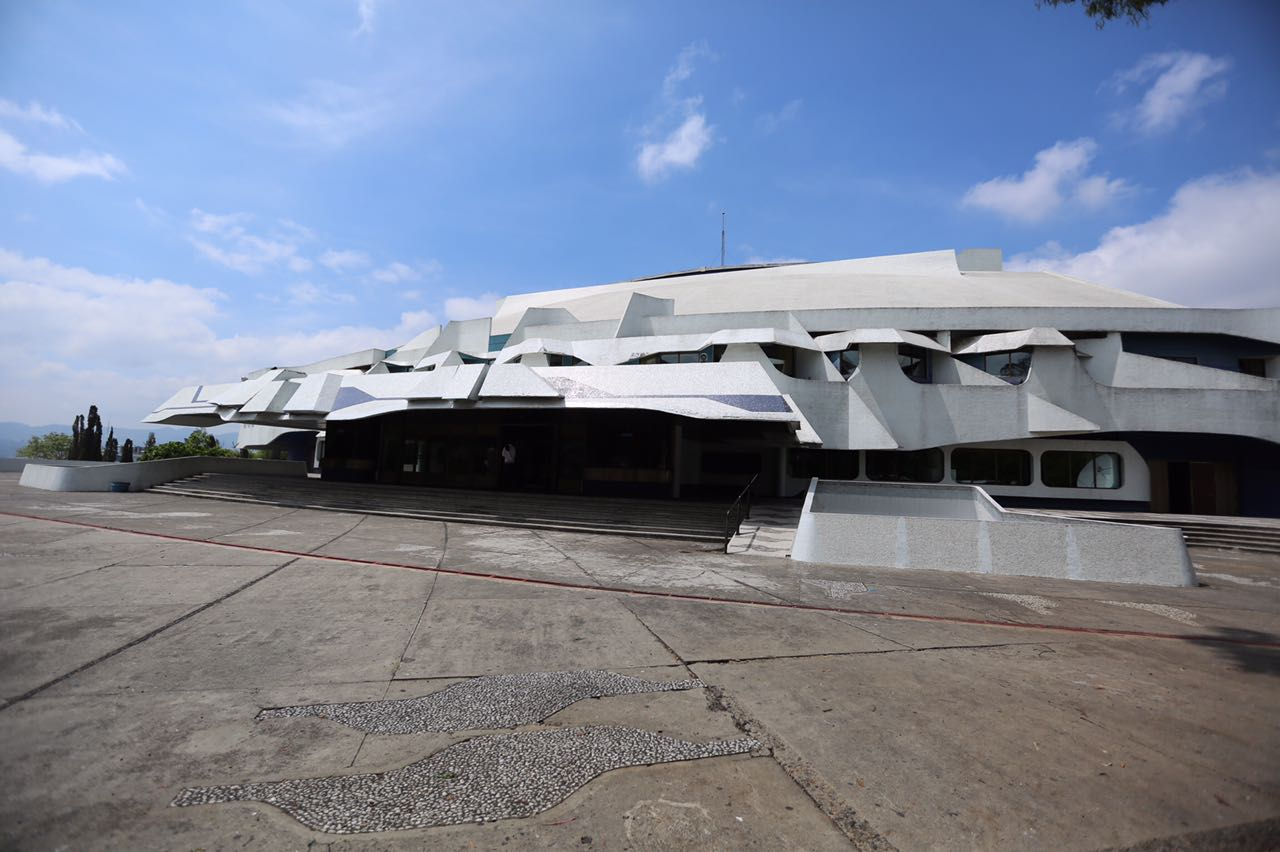

General information
- Type: Cultural Center
- Location: Guatemala City, Guatemala
- Completed: 1973
- Opened: 16 June 1978

Design and construction
- Architect: Efraín Recinos

Website
- Centro Cultural “Miguel Ángel Asturias” - Portal MCD

The Centro Cultural Miguel Ángel Asturias, commonly called Teatro Nacional, is a cultural center in Guatemala City, Guatemala. It is located in the Centro Cívico (Civic Center) of the city and was built in the same place of the old Fuerte de San José. Its form, which emulates a seated jaguar, stands out from the adjacent buildings. The complex, which was designed by the architects Efrain Recinos and Carlos Alberto Haeussler was completed in 1978.

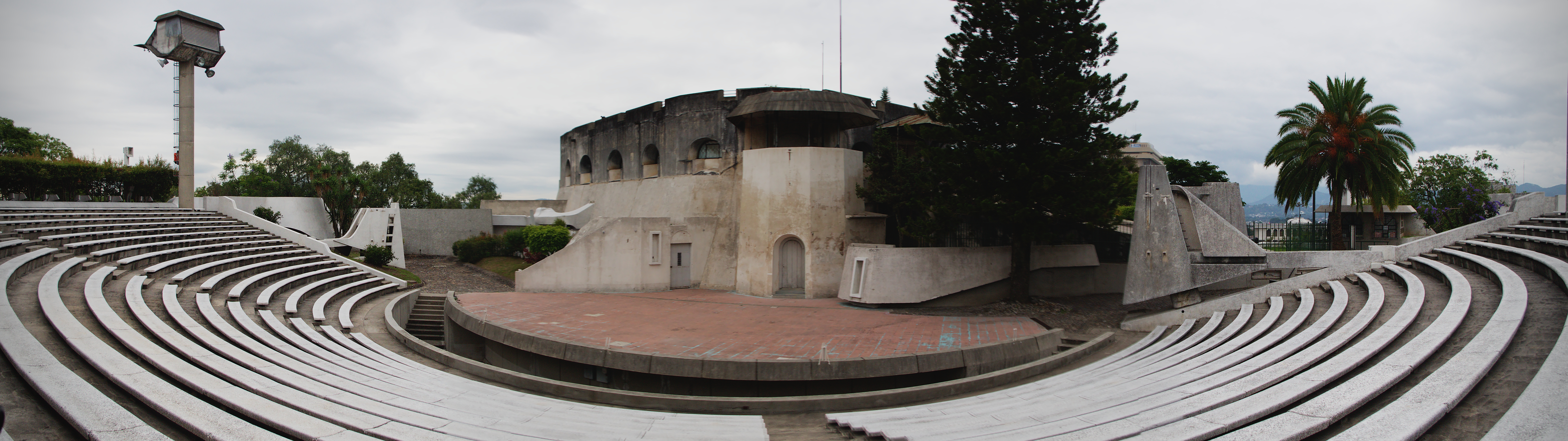
Outdoor theater Miguel Miguel Ángel Asturias Cultural Center Guatemala.

The center is named for Guatemalan writer and Nobel Prize in Literature laureate Miguel Ángel Asturias. It contains the Gran Sala Efrain Recinos, a large proscenium theater named for the architect that designed the structure's facade, the Teatro de Cámara Hugo Carrillo, a smaller, black box theater named for the Guatemalan playwright and director, and an outdoor amphitheater, the Teatro al Aire Libre. The center also includes various plazas and salons, as well as the National Marimba Institute, Instituto Nacional de la Marimba.

Asturias' remains were interred at the cultural center on 15 November 2026, having been transferred from the Père Lachaise Cemetery in Paris 52 years after the writer's death.
