= Miguel Ángel Asturias =

Guatemalan writer and poet-diplomat (1899-1974)

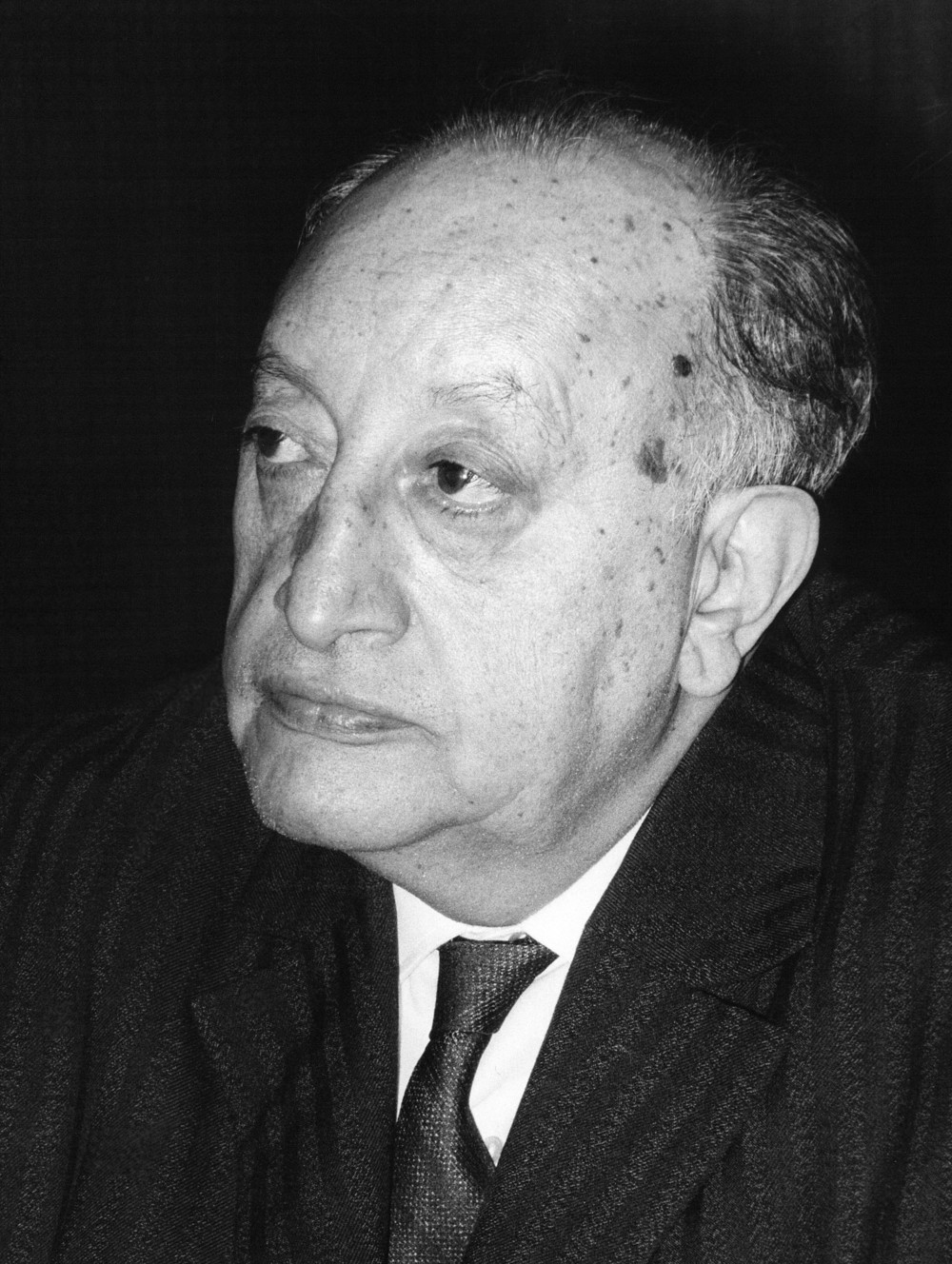
- Asturias in 1968
- Born: Miguel Ángel Asturias Rosales; 19 October 1899; Guatemala City, Guatemala
- Died: 9 June 1974 (aged 74); Madrid, Spain
- Occupation: Novelist
- Writing career
- Genres: Magic realism, dictator novel
- Notable works: El Señor Presidente, Men of Maize
- Notable awards: Lenin Peace Prize; Nobel Prize in Literature 1967

Miguel Ángel Asturias Rosales (Spanish: [mi(ˈ)ɣel ˈaŋxel asˈtuɾjas]; 19 October 1899 – 9 June 1974) was a Guatemalan poet-diplomat, novelist, playwright and journalist. Winning the Nobel Prize in Literature in 1967, his work helped bring attention to the importance of indigenous cultures, especially those of his native Guatemala.

Asturias was born and raised in Guatemala though he lived a significant part of his adult life abroad. He first lived in Paris in the 1920s where he studied ethnology. Some scholars view him as the first Latin American novelist to show how the study of anthropology and linguistics could affect the writing of literature. While in Paris, Asturias also associated with the Surrealist movement, and he is credited with introducing many features of modernist style such as magical realism into Latin American letters. In this way, he is an important precursor of the Latin American Boom of the 1960s and 1970s.

One of Asturias' most famous novels, El Señor Presidente, describes life under a ruthless dictator. It influenced later Latin American novelists in its mixture of realism and fantasy. Asturias' very public opposition to dictatorial rule led to him spending much of his later life in exile, both in South America and in Europe. The book that is sometimes described as his masterpiece, Hombres de maíz (Men of Maize), is a defense of Mayan culture and customs. Asturias combined his extensive knowledge of Mayan beliefs with his political convictions, channeling them into a life of commitment and solidarity. His work is often identified with the social and moral aspirations of the Guatemalan people.

After decades of exile and marginalization, Asturias finally received broad recognition in the 1960s. In 1966, he won the Soviet Union's Lenin Peace Prize. The following year he was awarded the Nobel Prize for Literature, becoming the second Latin American author to receive this honor (Gabriela Mistral had won it in 1945). Asturias spent his final years in Madrid, where he died at the age of 74. He was buried in the Père Lachaise Cemetery in Paris until his remains were transferred to Guatemala in 2026.

== Biography ==
=== Early life and education ===
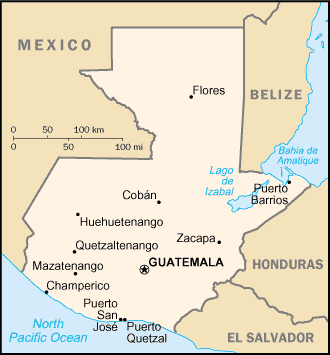
Map of Guatemala

Miguel Ángel Asturias was born in Guatemala City on 19 October 1899, the first child of Ernesto Asturias Girón, a lawyer and judge, and María Rosales de Asturias, a schoolteacher. Two years later, his brother, Marco Antonio, was born. Asturias's parents were of Spanish descent, and reasonably distinguished: his father could trace his family line back to colonists who had arrived in Guatemala in the 1660s; his mother, whose ancestry was more mixed, was the daughter of a colonel. In 1905, when the writer was six years old, the Asturias family moved to the house of Asturias' grandparents, where they lived a more comfortable lifestyle.

Despite his relative privilege, Asturias's father opposed the dictatorship of Manuel Estrada Cabrera, who had come to power in February 1898. As Asturias later recalled, "My parents were quite persecuted, though they were not imprisoned or anything of the sort". Following an incident in 1904 which, in his capacity as judge, Asturias Sr. set free some students arrested for causing a disturbance, he clashed directly with the dictator, lost his job, and he and his family were forced to move in 1905 to the town of Salamá, the departmental capital of Baja Verapaz, where Miguel Ángel Asturias lived on his grandparents' farm. It was here that Asturias first came into contact with Guatemala's indigenous people; his nanny, Lola Reyes, was a young indigenous woman who told him stories of their myths and legends that would later have a great influence on his work.

In 1908, when Asturias was nine, his family returned to the suburbs of Guatemala City. Here they established a supply store where Asturias spent his adolescence. Asturias first attended Colegio del Padre Pedro and then, Colegio del Padre Solís. Asturias began writing as a student and wrote the first draft of a story that would later become his novel El Señor Presidente.

In 1920, Asturias participated in the uprising against the dictator Manuel Estrada Cabrera. While enrolled in El Instituto Nacional de Varones (The National Institute for Boys) he took an active role, such as organizing strikes in his high school, in the overthrow of the dictatorship of Estrada Cabrera. He and his classmates formed what is now known to be "La Generación del 20" (The Generation of 20).

In 1922, Asturias and other students founded the Popular University, a community project whereby "the middle class was encouraged to contribute to the general welfare by teaching free courses to the underprivileged." Asturias spent a year studying medicine before switching to the faculty of law at the Universidad de San Carlos de Guatemala in Guatemala City. He obtained his law degree in 1923 and received the Gálvez Prize for his thesis on Indian problems. Asturias was also awarded the Premio Falla for being the top student in his faculty. It was at this university that he founded the Asociación de Estudiantes Universitarios (Association of University Students) and the Asociación de estudiantes El Derecho (Association of Law Students), in addition to actively participating in La Tribuna del Partido Unionista (Platform of the Unionist Party). It was ultimately the latter group which derailed the dictatorship of Estrada Cabrera. Both of the associations he founded have been recognized as being positively associated with Guatemalan patriotism. In reference to literature, Asturias' involvement in all of these organizations influenced many of his scenes in El Señor Presidente. Asturias was thus involved in politics; working as a representative of the Asociación General de Estudiantes Universitarios (General Association of University Students), and traveling to El Salvador and Honduras for his new job.

Asturias' university thesis, "The Social Problem of the Indian," was published in 1923. After receiving his law degree the same year, Asturias moved to Europe. He had originally planned to live in England and study political economy, but changed his mind. He soon transferred to Paris, where he studied ethnology at the Sorbonne (University of Paris) and became a dedicated surrealist under the influence of the French poet and literary theorist André Breton. While there, he was influenced by the gathering of writers and artists in Montparnasse, and began writing poetry and fiction. During this time, Asturias developed a deep concern for Mayan culture and in 1925 he worked to translate the Mayan sacred text, the Popol Vuh, into Spanish, a project which he spent 40 years on. He also founded a magazine while in Paris called Tiempos Nuevos or New Times. In 1930, Asturias published his first novel Leyendas de Guatemala. Two years later, in Paris, Asturias received the Sylla Monsegur Prize for the French translations of Leyendas de Guatemala. On July 14, 1933, he returned to Guatemala after ten years in Paris.

=== Exile and rehabilitation ===
Asturias devoted much of his political energy towards supporting the government of Jacobo Árbenz, successor to Juan José Arévalo Bermejo. Asturias was asked following his work as an ambassador to help suppress the threat of rebels from El Salvador. The rebels ultimately succeeded in invading Guatemala and overthrew Jacobo Árbenz' rule in 1954 with the support of the U.S. government. Arbenz's policies were contrary to interests of United Fruit who lobbied heavily for his ousting. When the government of Jacobo Árbenz fell Asturias was expelled from the country by Carlos Castillo Armas because of his support for Árbenz. He was stripped of his Guatemalan citizenship and went to live in Buenos Aires and Chile, where he spent the next eight years of his life. When another change of government in Argentina meant that he once more had to seek a new home, Asturias moved to Europe. While living in exile in Genoa his reputation grew as an author with the release of his novel, Mulata de Tal (1963).

In 1966, democratically elected President Julio César Méndez Montenegro achieved power and Asturias was given back his Guatemalan citizenship. Montenegro appointed Asturias as ambassador to France, where he served until 1970, taking up a permanent residence in Paris. A year later, in 1967, English translations of Mulata de Tal were published in Boston.

Later in Asturias' life he helped found the Popular University of Guatemala. Asturias spent his final years in Madrid, where he died in 1974. He is buried in the 10th division of the Père Lachaise Cemetery in Paris.

On 9 June 2024, President Bernardo Arévalo announced that the family of Miguel Ángel Asturias had agreed to repatriate his remains to Guatemalan territory. That same day, the "year of Miguel Ángel Asturias" was inaugurated to commemorate the 125th anniversary of his birth and 50th anniversary of his death. Asturias' ashes arrived in Guatemala City on 12 November 2026 with a ceremony attended by President Arévalo. His remains were interred at the Centro Cultural Miguel Ángel Asturias on 15 November.

=== Family ===
Asturias married his first wife, Clemencia Amado (1915–1979), in 1939. They had two sons, Miguel and Rodrigo Ángel, before divorcing in 1947. Asturias then met and married his second wife, Blanca Mora y Araujo (1904–2000), in 1950. Mora y Araujo was Argentinian, and so when Asturias was deported from Guatemala in 1954, he went to live in the Argentinian capital of Buenos Aires. He lived in his wife's homeland for eight years. Asturias dedicated his novel Week-end en Guatemala to his wife, Blanca, after it was published in 1956. They remained married until Asturias' death in 1974.

Asturias' son from his first marriage, Rodrigo Asturias, under the nom de guerre Gaspar Ilom, the name of an indigenous rebel in his father's own novel, Men of Maize, was President of the Unidad Revolucionaria Nacional Guatemalteca (URNG). The URNG was a rebel group active in the 1980s, during the Guatemalan Civil War, and after the peace accords in 1996.

== Major works ==
=== Leyendas de Guatemala ===
Asturias' first book to be published, Leyendas de Guatemala (Legends of Guatemala; 1930), is a collection of nine stories that explore Mayan myths from before the Spanish conquest as well as themes that relate to the development of a Guatemalan national identity. Asturias' fascination with pre-Columbian texts such as Popul Vuh and Anales de los Xahil, as well as his beliefs in popular myths and legends, have heavily influenced the work. Academic Jean Franco describes the book as, "lyrical recreations of Guatemalan folk-lore gaining inspiration from pre-Columbian and colonial sources." For Latin American literature critic Gerald Martin, Leyendas de Guatemala is, "The first major anthropological contribution to Spanish American literature." According to academic Francisco Solares-Larrave, the stories are a precursor to the magical realism movement. Asturias used conventional writing and lyrical prose to tell a story about birds and other animals conversing with other archetypal human beings. Asturias' writing style in Leyendas de Guatemala has been described by some as "historia-sueño-poemas" (history-dream-poem). In each legend, Asturias draws the reader in with a fury of beauty and mystery without being able to comprehend the sense of space and time. Leyendas de Guatemala brought Asturias critical praise in France as well as in Guatemala. The noted French poet and essayist Paul Valéry wrote of the book, "I found it brought about a tropical dream, which I experienced with singular delight."

=== El Señor Presidente ===
A translation of El Señor Presidente, one of Asturias's best-known works.

One of Asturias' most critically acclaimed novels, El Señor Presidente was completed in 1933 but remained unpublished until 1946, where it was privately released in Mexico. As one of his earliest works, El Señor Presidente showcased Asturias's talent and influence as a novelist. Zimmerman and Rojas describe his work as an "impassioned denunciation of the Guatemalan dictator Manuel Estrada Cabrera." The novel was written during Asturias's exile in Paris. While completing the novel, Asturias associated with members of the Surrealist movement as well as fellow future Latin American writers, such as Arturo Uslar Pietri and the Cuban Alejo Carpentier. El Señor Presidente is one of many novels to explore life under a Latin American dictator and in fact, has been heralded by some as the first real novel exploring the subject of dictatorship. The book has also been called a study of fear because fear is the climate in which it unfolds.

El Señor Presidente uses surrealistic techniques and reflects Asturias' notion that Indian's non-rational awareness of reality is an expression of subconscious forces. Although the author never specifies where the novel takes place, it is clear that the plot is influenced by Guatemalan president, and well-known dictator, Manuel Estrada Cabrera's rule. Asturias's novel examines how evil spreads downward from a powerful political leader, into the streets and homes of the citizens. Many themes, such as justice and love, are mocked in the novel, and escape from the dictator's tyranny is seemingly impossible. Each character within the novel is deeply affected by the dictatorship and must struggle to survive in a terrifying reality. The story opens with the accidental murder of a high official, Colonel Parrales Sonriente. The President uses the Colonel's death to dispose of two men as he decides to frame them both for the murder. The tactics of the President are often viewed as sadistic, as he believes his word is the law which no one shall question. The novel then travels with several characters, some close to the President and some seeking escape from his regime. The dictator's trusted adviser, whom the reader knows as "Angel Face", falls in love with a General Canales's daughter, Camila. Also, Angel Face, under the direct order of the President, convinces General Canales that immediate flight is imperative. Unfortunately, the General is one of the two men the President is trying to frame for murder; the President's plan to make General Canales appear guilty is to have him shot while fleeing. The General is hunted for execution while his daughter is held under house arrest by Angel Face. Angel Face is torn between his love for her and his duty to the President. While the Dictator is never named, he has striking similarities to Manuel Estrada Cabrera.

Playwright Hugo Carrillo adapted El Señor Presidente into a play in 1974.

=== Men of Maize ===
Men of Maize (Hombres de maíz, 1949) is usually considered to be Asturias's masterpiece, yet remains one of the least understood novels produced by Asturias. The title Hombres de maíz refers to the Maya Indians' belief that the first humans were made of corn. The novel is written in six parts, each exploring the contrast of traditional Indian customs and a progressive, modernizing society. Asturias's book explores the magical world of indigenous communities, a subject about which the author was both passionate and knowledgeable. The novel draws on traditional legend, but the story is of Asturias's own creation. The plot revolves around an isolated Indian community (the men of maize or "people of corn") whose land is under threat by outsiders, with the intent of commercial exploitation. An indigenous leader, Gaspar Ilom, leads the community's resistance to the planters, who kill him in the hope of thwarting the rebellion. Beyond the grave Ilom lives on as a "folk-hero"; despite his efforts, the people still lose their land. In the second half of the novel, the central character is a postman, Nicho, and the story revolves around his search for his lost wife. In the course of his quest he abandons his duties, tied as they are to "white society", and transforms himself into a coyote, which represents his guardian spirit. This transformation is yet another reference to Mayan culture; the belief of nahualism, or a man's ability to assume the shape of his guardian animal, is one of the many essential aspects to understanding the hidden meanings in the novel. Through allegory, Asturias shows how European imperialism dominates and transforms native traditions in the Americas. By the novel's end, as Jean Franco notes, "the magic world of Indian legend has been lost"; but it concludes on a "Utopian note," as the people become ants to transport the maize they have harvested.

Written in the form of a myth, the novel is experimental, ambitious, and difficult to follow. For instance, its "time scheme is a mythic time in which many thousands of years may be compressed and seen as a single moment", and the book's language is also "structured so as to be analogous to Indian languages". Because of its unusual approach, it was some time before the novel was accepted by critics and the public.

=== The Banana Trilogy ===
Asturias wrote an epic trilogy about the exploitation of the native Indians on banana plantations. This trilogy comprises three novels: Viento fuerte (Strong Wind; 1950), El Papa Verde (The Green Pope; 1954), and Los ojos de los enterrados (The Eyes of the Interred; 1960). It is a fictional account of the results of foreign control over the Central American banana industry. At first, the volumes were only published in small quantities in his native Guatemala. His critique of foreign control of the banana industry and how Guatemalan natives were exploited eventually earned him the Soviet Union's highest prize, the Lenin Peace Prize. This recognition marked Asturias as one of the few authors recognized in both the West and the Communist bloc during the period of the Cold War for his literary works.

=== Mulata de tal ===
Asturias published his novel Mulata de tal while he and his wife were living in Genoa in 1963. His novel received many positive reviews; Ideologies and Literature described it as "a carnival incarnated in the novel. It represents a collision between Mayan Mardi Gras and Hispanic baroque." The novel emerged as a major novel during the 1960s. The plot revolves around the battle between Catalina and Yumí to control Mulata (the moon spirit). Yumí and Catalina become experts in sorcery and are criticized by the Church for their practices. The novel uses Mayan mythology and Catholic tradition to form a distinctive allegory of belief.

Gerald Martin in the Hispanic Review commented that it is "sufficiently obvious that the whole art of this novel rests upon its language". In general, Asturias matches the visual freedom of the cartoon by using every resource the Spanish language offers him. His use of color is striking and immeasurably more liberal than in earlier novels." Asturias built the novel with this unique use of color, liberal theory, and his distinctive use of the Spanish language. His novel also received the Silla Monsegur Prize for the best Spanish-American novel published in France.

== Themes ==
=== Identity ===
Postcolonial Guatemalan identity is influenced by a mixture of Mayan and European culture. Asturias, himself a mestizo, proposed a hybrid national soul for Guatemala (ladino in its language, Mayan in its mythology). His quest to create an authentic Guatemalan national identity is central to his first published novel, Leyendas de Guatemala, and is a pervasive theme throughout his works. When asked by interviewer Günter W. Lorenz how he perceives his role as a Latin American writer, he responds, "...I felt it was my calling and my duty to write about America, which would someday be of interest to the world." Later in the interview Asturias identifies himself as a spokesman for Guatemala, saying, "...Among the Indians there's a belief in the Gran Lengua (Big Tongue). The Gran Lengua is the spokesman for the tribe. And in a way that's what I've been: the spokesman for my tribe."

=== Politics ===
Throughout Asturias' literary career, he was continually involved in politics. He was openly opposed to the Cabrera Dictatorship and worked as an ambassador in various Latin American countries. His political opinions come through in a number of his works. Some political themes found in his books are the following: Spanish colonization of Latin America and the decline of the Maya civilization; the effects of political dictatorships on society; and the exploitation of the Guatemala people by foreign-owned agricultural companies.

Asturias' collection of short stories, Leyendas de Guatemala, is loosely based on Maya mythology and legends. The author chose legends spanning from the creation of the Maya people to the arrival of the Spanish conquistadors hundreds of years later. Asturias introduces the Spanish colonizers in his story "Leyenda del tesoro del Lugar Florido" (Legend of the Treasure from the Flowering Place). In this story, a sacrificial ritual is interrupted by the unexpected arrival of "the white man" ("los hombres blancos"). The tribe scatters in fright of the intruders and their treasure is left behind in the hands of the white man. Jimena Sáenz argues that this story represents the fall of the Maya civilization at the hands of the Spanish conquistadors.

El Señor Presidente does not explicitly identify its setting as early twentieth-century Guatemala, however, the novel's title character was inspired by the 1898–1920 presidency of Manuel Estrada Cabrera. The character of the President rarely appears in the story but Asturias employs a number of other characters to show the terrible effects of living under a dictatorship. This book was a notable contribution to the dictator novel genre. Asturias was unable to publish the book in Guatemala for thirteen years because of the strict censorship laws of the Ubico government, a dictatorship that ruled Guatemala from 1931 to 1944.

Following the Second World War, the United States continually increased its presence in Latin American economies. Companies such as the United Fruit Company manipulated Latin American politicians and exploited land, resources, and Guatemalan laborers. The effects of American companies in Guatemala inspired Asturias to write "The Banana Trilogy," a series of three novels published in 1950, 1954, and 1960 that revolve around the exploitation of indigenous farm laborers and the monopoly presence of the United Fruit Company in Guatemala.

Asturias was very concerned with the marginalization and poverty of the Maya people in Guatemala. He believed that socio-economic development in Guatemala depended on better integration of indigenous communities, a more equal distribution of wealth in the country, and working to lower the rates of illiteracy amongst other prevalent issues. Asturias' choice to publicize some of the political problems of Guatemala in his novels brought international attention to them. He was awarded the Lenin Peace Prize and the Nobel Prize for Literature because of the political criticisms included in his books.

=== Nature ===
Guatemala and America are, for Asturias, a country and a continent of nature. Nahum Megged in her article "Artificio y naturaleza en las obras de Miguel Angel Asturias," writes on how his work embodies the "captivating totality of nature" and how it does not use nature solely as a backdrop for the drama. She explains that the characters in his books who are most in harmony with nature are the protagonists and those who disrupt the balance of nature are the antagonists. The theme of the erotic personification of nature in his novels is pervasive throughout his novels. An example being in Leyendas de Guatemala in which he writes, "El tropico es el sexo de la tierra."

== Writing style ==
Asturias was greatly inspired by the Maya culture of Central America. It is an overarching theme in many of his works and greatly influenced the style of this writing.

=== Mayan influence ===
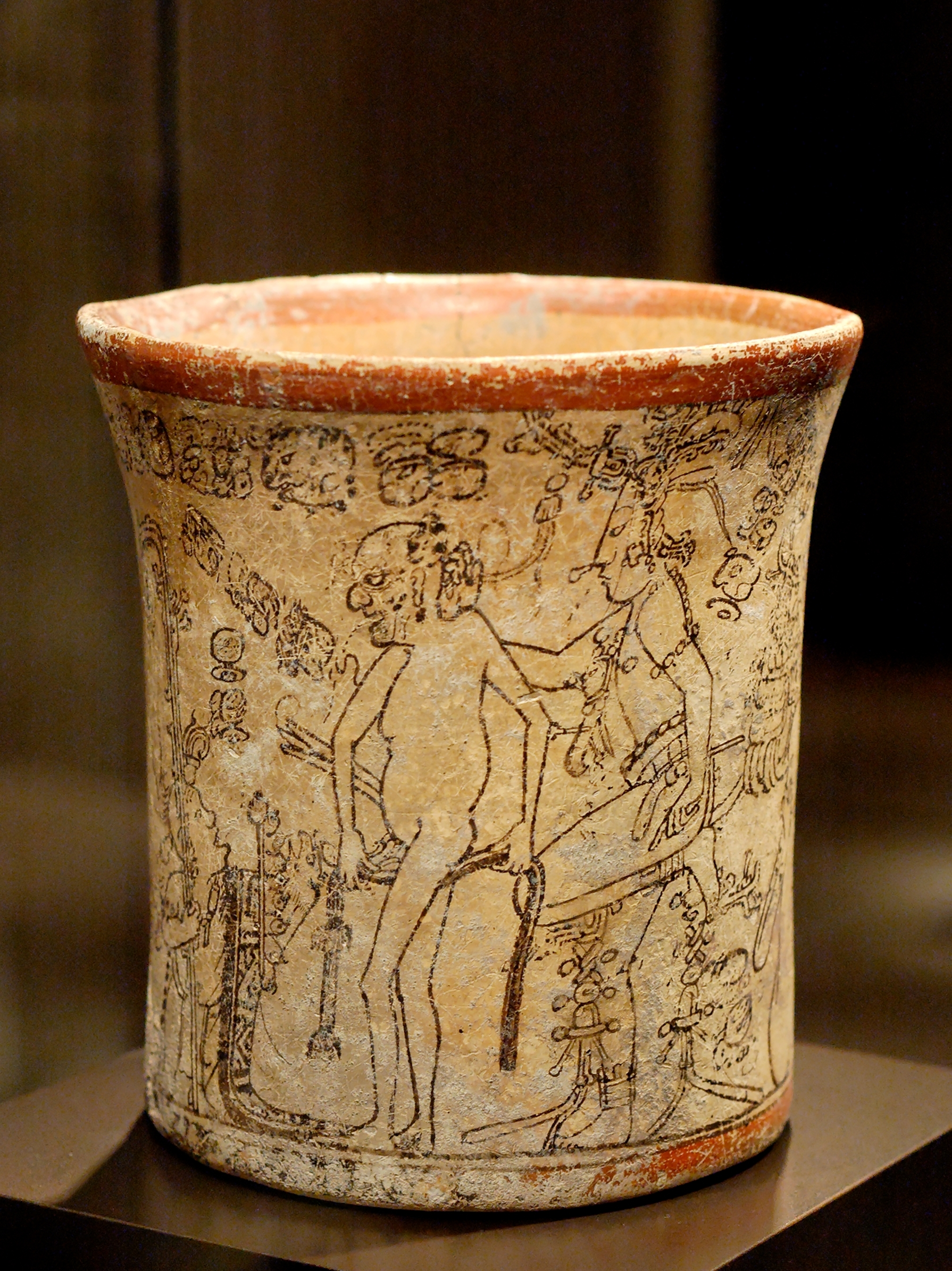
Maya vase depicting a lord of the underworld stripped of clothes and headgear by the young maize divinity.

The Guatemala that exists today was founded on top of a substratus of Mayan culture. Before the arrival of the Spanish conquistadors, this civilization was very advanced politically, economically, and socially. This rich Mayan culture has had an undeniable influence on Asturias' literary works. He believed in the sacredness of the Mayan traditions and worked to bring life back into its culture by integrating the Indian imagery and tradition into his novels. Asturias studied at the Sorbonne (the University of Paris at that time) with Georges Raynaud, an expert in the culture of the Quiché Maya. In 1926, he finished a translation of the Popol Vuh, the sacred book of the Mayas. Fascinated by the mythology of the indigenous people of Guatemala, he wrote Leyendas de Guatemala (Legends of Guatemala). This fictional work re-tells some of the Mayan folkloric stories of his homeland.

Certain aspects of indigenous life were of a unique interest to Asturias. Commonly known as corn, maize is an integral part of Mayan culture. It is not only a main staple in their diet but plays an important role in the Mayan creation story found in the Popul Vuh. This particular story was the influence for Asturias' novel Hombres de maíz (Men of Maize), a mythological fable that introduces readers to the life, customs, and psyche of a Maya Indian.

Asturias did not speak any Mayan language and admitted that his interpretations of the indigenous psyche were intuitive and speculative. In taking such liberties, there are many possibilities for error. However, Lourdes Royano Gutiérrez argues that his work remains valid because in this literary situation, intuition served as a better tool than scientific analysis. In accordance, Jean Franco categorizes Asturias along with Rosario Castellanos and José María Arguedas as "Indianist" authors. She argues that all three of these writers were led to "break with realism precisely because of the limitations of the genre when it came to representing the Indian". For example, Asturias used a lyrical and experimental style in Men of Maize, which Franco believed to be a more authentic way of representing the indigenous mind than traditional prose.

When asked about his method of interpreting the Mayan psyche, Asturias was quoted saying "I listened a lot, I imagined a little, and invented the rest" (Oí mucho, supuse un poco más e inventé el resto). In spite of his inventions, his ability to incorporate his knowledge in Mayan ethnology into his novels make his work authentic and convincing.

=== Surrealism and magical realism ===
Surrealism has contributed greatly to the works of Asturias. Characterized by its exploration of the subconscious mind, the genre allowed Asturias to cross boundaries of fantasy and reality. Although Asturias' works were seen as preceding magical realism, the author saw many similarities between the two genres. Asturias discussed the idea of magical realism in his own works linking it explicitly to surrealism. He did not, however, use the term to describe his own material. He used it instead in reference to the Mayan stories written before the conquest of America by the Europeans, stories such as Popul Vuh or Los Anales de los Xahil. In an interview with his friend and biographer Günter W. Lorenz, Asturias discusses how these stories fit his view of magical realism and relate to surrealism, saying, "Between the "real" and the "magic" there is a third sort of reality. It is a melting of the visible and the tangible, the hallucination and the dream. It is similar to what the surrealists around [André] Breton wanted and it is what we could call "magic realism." Although the two genres shared much in common, magical realism is often considered as having been born in Latin America.

As mentioned above, Maya culture was an important inspiration for Asturias. He saw a direct relationship between magical realism and Indigenous mentality, saying, "...an Indian or a mestizo in a small village might describe how he saw an enormous stone turn into a person or a giant, or a cloud turn into a stone. That is not a tangible reality but one that involves an understanding of supernatural forces. That is why when I have to give it a literary label I call it "magic realism." Similarly, scholar Lourdes Royano Gutiérrez argues that surrealist thought is not entirely different from the indigenous or mestizo worldview. Royano Gutiérrez describes this worldview as one in which the border between reality and dream is porous and not concrete. It is clear from both Asturias' and Gutiérrez' quotes that magical realism was seen as a suitable genre to represent an indigenous character's thoughts. The surrealist/magical realist style is exemplified in Asturias' works Mulata de tal and El señor Presidente.

=== Use of language ===
Asturias was one of the first Latin American novelists to realize the enormous potential of language in literature. He had a very profound linguistic style that he employed to convey his literary vision. In his works, language is more than a form of expression or a means to an end and can be quite abstract. Language does not give life to his work, rather the organic language Asturias uses has a life of its own within his work ("El lenguage tiene vida propia").

For example, in his novel "Leyendas de Guatemala", there is a rhythmic, musical style to writing. In many of his works, he is known to have frequently used onomatopoeias, repetitions and symbolism, techniques which are also prevalent in pre-Columbian texts. His modern interpretation of the Mayan writing style later became his trademark. Asturias synthesized the liturgic diction found in the ancient Popul Vuh with colourful, exuberant vocabulary. This unique style has been called "tropical baroque" ("barroquismo tropical") by scholar Lourdes Royano Gutiérrez in her analysis of his major works.

In Mulata de tal, Asturias fuses surrealism with indigenous tradition in something called the "great language" ("la gran lengua"). In this Maya tradition, the people bestow magical power to certain words and phrases; similar to a witch's chant or curse. In his stories, Asturias restores this power to words and lets them speak for themselves: "Los toros toronegros, los toros torobravos, los toros torotumbos, los torostorostoros" ("the bulls bullsblack, the bulls bullsbrave, the bulls bullsshake, the bullsbullsbulls").

Asturias uses a significant amount of Mayan vocabulary in his works. A glossary can be found at the end of Hombres de maíz, Leyendas de Guatemala, El Señor Presidente, Viento Fuerte, and El Papa verde in order to better understand the rich combination of colloquial Guatemalan and indigenous words.

== Legacy ==
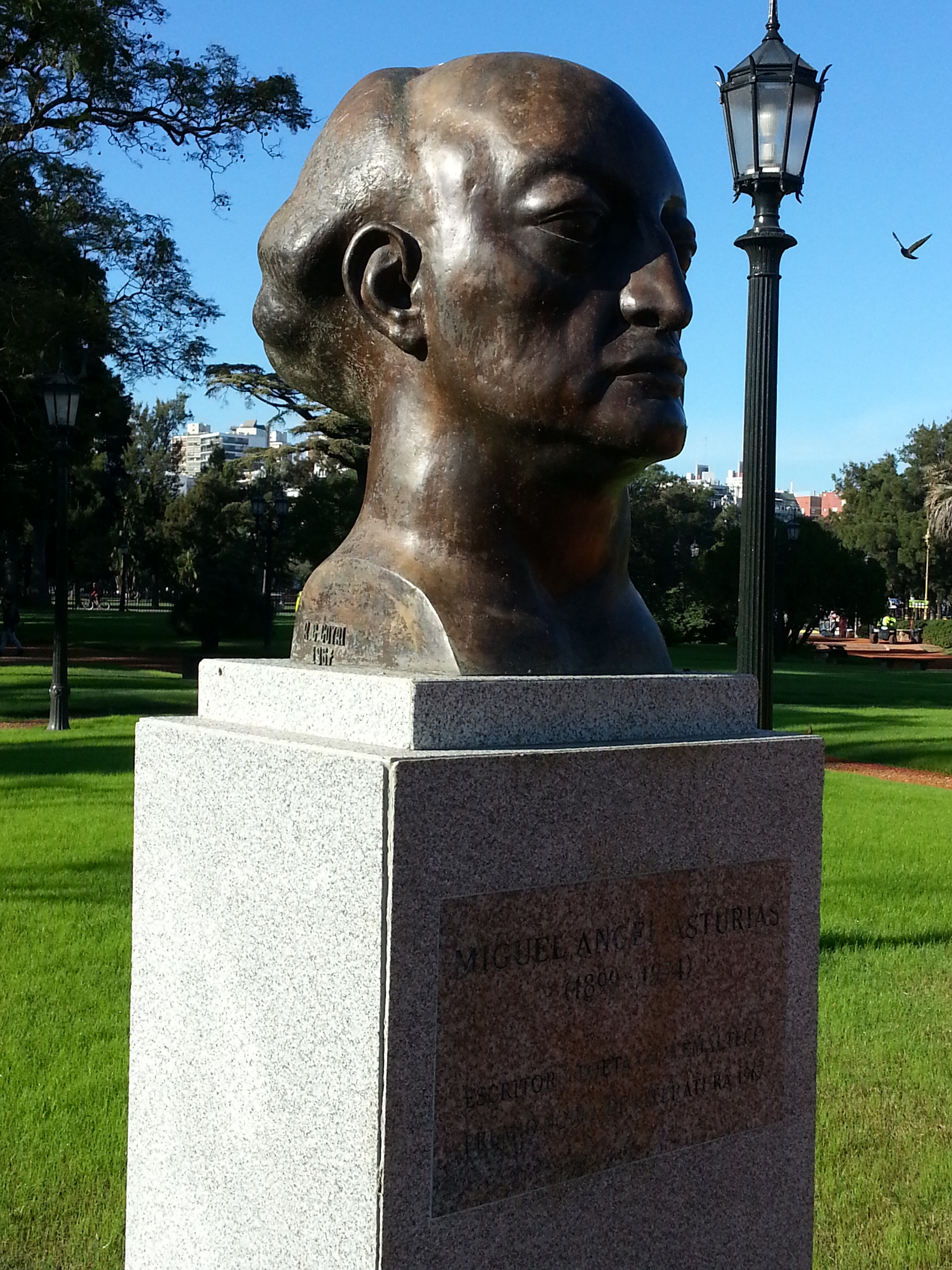
Bust of Miguel Ángel Asturias. Paseo de los Poetas, Rosedal de Palermo, Parque Tres de Febrero, Buenos Aires.

After his death in 1974, his home country acknowledged his contribution to Guatemalan literature by establishing literary awards and scholarships in his name. One of these is the country's most distinguished literary prize, the Miguel Ángel Asturias National Prize in Literature. In addition, Guatemala City's national theatre, the Centro Cultural Miguel Ángel Asturias, is named after him.

Asturias is remembered as a man who believed strongly in recognizing indigenous culture in Guatemala. For Gerald Martin, Asturias is one of what he terms "the ABC writers—Asturias, Borges, Carpentier" who, he argues, "really initiated Latin American modernism." His experimentation with style and language is considered by some scholars as a precursor to the magical realism genre.

Critics compare his fiction to that of Franz Kafka, James Joyce, and William Faulkner because of the stream-of-consciousness style he employed. His work has been translated into numerous languages such as English, French, German, Swedish, Italian, Portuguese, Russian and many more.

== Awards ==
Asturias received many honors and literary awards over the course of his career. One of the more notable awards was the Nobel Prize for Literature, which he received in 1967 for Hombres de maiz. This award caused some controversy at the time because of his relative anonymity outside of Latin America. Robert G. Mead criticized the choice because he thought that there were more well-known deserving candidates. In 1966, Asturias was awarded the Soviet Union's Lenin Peace Prize. He received this recognition for La trilogía bananera (The Banana Trilogy) in which he criticizes the presence of aggressive American companies such as The United Fruit Company in Latin American countries.

Other prizes for Asturias' work include: el Premio Galvez (1923); Chavez Prize (1923); and the Prix Sylla Monsegur (1931), for Leyendas de Guatemala; as well as the Prix du Meilleur Livre Étranger for El señor presidente (1952).

== Works ==
Novels

- El Señor Presidente. – Mexico City : Costa-Amic, 1946 (translated by Frances Partridge. New York: Macmillan, 1963)
- Hombres de maíz. – Buenos Aires : Losada, 1949 (Men of Maize / translated by Gerald Martin. – New York : Delacorte/Seymour Lawrence, 1975)
- Viento fuerte. – Buenos Aires : Ministerio de Educación Pública, 1950 (Strong Wind / translated by Gregory Rabassa. – New York : Delacorte, 1968; Cyclone / translated by Darwin Flakoll and Claribel Alegría. – London : Owen, 1967)
- El papa verde. – Buenos Aires : Losada, 1954 (The Green Pope / translated by Gregory Rabassa. – New York : Delacorte, 1971)
- Los ojos de los enterrados. – Buenos Aires : Losada, 1960 (The Eyes of the Interred / translated by Gregory Rabassa. – New York : Delacorte, 1973)
- El alhajadito. – Buenos Aires : Goyanarte, 1961 (The Bejeweled Boy / translated by Martin Shuttleworth. – Garden City, N.Y.: Doubleday, 1971)
- Mulata de tal. – Buenos Aires : Losada, 1963 (The Mulatta and Mr. Fly / translated by Gregory Rabassa. – London : Owen, 1963)
- Maladrón. – Buenos Aires, Losada, 1969
- Viernes de Dolores. – Buenos Aires : Losada, 1972

Story Collections

- Rayito de estrella. – Paris : Imprimerie Française de l'Edition, 1925
- Leyendas de Guatemala. – Madrid : Oriente, 1930
- Week-end en Guatemala. – Buenos Aires : Losada, 1956
- El espejo de Lida Sal. – Mexico City : Siglo Veintiuno, 1967 (The Mirror of Lida Sal : Tales Based on Mayan Myths and Guatemalan Legends / translated by Gilbert Alter-Gilbert. – Pittsburgh : Latin American Literary Review, 1997)
- Tres de cuatro soles. – Madrid : Closas-Orcoyen, 1971

Children's Book

- La Maquinita de hablar. – 1971 (The Talking Machine / translated by Beverly Koch. – Garden City, N.Y. : Doubleday, 1971)
- El Hombre que lo Tenía Todo Todo Todo. – 1973 (The Man that Had it All, All, All)

Anthologies

- Torotumbo; La audiencia de los confines; Mensajes indios. – Barcelona : Plaza & Janés, 1967
- Antología de Miguel Ángel Asturias . – México, Costa-Amic, 1968
- Viajes, ensayos y fantasías / Compilación y prólogo Richard J. Callan . – Buenos Aires : Losada, 1981
- El hombre que lo tenía todo, todo, todo; La leyenda del Sombrerón; La leyenda del tesoro del Lugar Florido. – Barcelona : Bruguera, 1981
- El árbol de la cruz. – Nanterre : ALLCA XX/Université Paris X, Centre de Recherches Latino-Américanes, 1993
- Cuentos y leyendas. – Madrid, Allca XX, 2000 (Mario Roberto Morales Compilation)

Poetry

- Rayito de estrella; fantomima. – Imprimerie Française de l'Edition, 1929
- Emulo Lipolidón: fantomima. – Guatemala City : Américana, 1935
- Sonetos. – Guatemala City : Américana, 1936
- Alclasán; fantomima. – Guatemala City : Américana, 1940
- Con el rehén en los dientes: Canto a Francia. – Guatemala City : Zadik, 1942
- Anoche, 10 de marzo de 1543. – Guatemala City : Talleres tipográficos de Cordón, 1943
- Poesía : Sien de alondra. – Buenos Aires : Argos, 1949
- Ejercicios poéticos en forma de sonetos sobre temas de Horacio. – Buenos Aires : Botella al Mar, 1951
- Alto es el Sur : Canto a la Argentina. – La Plata, Argentina : Talleres gráficos Moreno, 1952
- Bolívar : Canto al Libertador. – San Salvador : Ministerio de Cultura, 1955
- Nombre custodio e imagen pasajera. – La Habana, Talleres de Úcar, García, S.A., 1959
- Clarivigilia primaveral. – Buenos Aires : Losada, 1965.
- Sonetos de Italia. – Varese-Milán, Instituto Editoriale Cisalpino, 1965.
- Miguel Ángel Asturias, raíz y destino: Poesía inédita, 1917–1924. – Guatemala City : Artemis Edinter, 1999

Theatre

- Soluna : Comedia prodigiosa en dos jornadas y un final. – Buenos Aires : Losange, 1955
- La audiencia de los confines. – Buenos Aires : Ariadna, 1957
- Teatro : Chantaje, Dique seco, Soluna, La audiencia de los confines. – Buenos Aires : Losada, 1964
- El Rey de la Altaneria. – 1968

Librettos

- Emulo Lipolidón: fantomima. – Guatemala City : Américana, 1935.
- Imágenes de nacimiento. – 1935

Essays

- Sociología guatemalteca: El problema social del indio. – Guatemala City Sánchez y de Guise, 1923 (Guatemalan Sociology : The Social Problem of the Indian / translated by Maureen Ahern. – Tempe : Arizona State University Center for Latin American Studies, 1977)
- La arquitectura de la vida nueva. – Guatemala City : Goubaud, 1928
- Carta aérea a mis amigos de América. – Buenos Aires : Casa impresora Francisco A. Colombo, 1952
- Rumania; su nueva imagen. – Xalapa : Universidad Veracruzana, 1964
- Latinoamérica y otros ensayos. – Madrid : Guadiana, 1968
- Comiendo en Hungría. – Barcelona : Lumen, 1969
- América, fábula de fábulas y otros ensayos. – Caracas : Monte Avila Editores, 1972

== Literary and artistic friendships ==
Throughout his years and travels, Miguel Ángel Asturias established several friendships with various academics and writers. Among them, his friendship with Pablo Neruda, whom he met in 1940 in Mexico, stands out, as well as his relationships with Giuseppe Bellini, an Italian scholar, and Cristóbal Humberto Ibarra, a Salvadoran writer for whom he wrote the preface to the book Cuentos de sima y cima.

== See also ==
- Miguel Ángel Asturias National Prize in Literature, Guatemala's most prestigious literary prize
- Centro Cultural Miguel Ángel Asturias, national theatre and cultural complex in Guatemala City
