= Prodigy discography =

- Studio albums: 7
- Extended plays: 2
- Singles: 17
- Collaborative albums: 4
- Mixtapes: 5
- Guest appearances: 22

The discography of Prodigy, an American rapper and one half of the hip hop duo Mobb Deep, consists of 7 studio albums, 3 collaborative albums, 2 EPs, 5 mixtapes and 17 singles.

== Albums ==
=== Studio albums ===
List of studio albums, with selected chart positions
Title	Album details	Peak chart positions				Sales	Certifications
Title	Album details	US	US R&B	US Rap	CAN	Sales	Certifications
H.N.I.C.	Released: November 14, 2000; Label: Loud, SRC, Sony, Infamous; Formats: CD, LP, digital download	18	6	6	—	US: 500,000+	RIAA: Gold
Return of the Mac	Released: March 27, 2007; Label: E1; Formats: CD, digital download	32	9	5	72	US: 130,000	
H.N.I.C. Pt. 2	Released: April 22, 2008; Label: Voxonic; Formats: CD, digital download	36	3	2	—	US: 100,000	
H.N.I.C. 3	Released: July 3, 2012; Label: Infamous; Formats: CD, digital download	105	16	15	—	US: 12,000	
The Bumpy Johnson Album	Released: October 2, 2012; Label: Infamous; Formats: Digital download	—	—	—	—		
Hegelian Dialectic (The Book of Revelation)	Released: January 20, 2017; Label: Infamous; Formats: CD, Digital download	—	—	—	—		
The Hegelian Dialectic 2: The Book of Heroine	Released: September 30, 2022; Label: Infamous; Formats: CD, Digital download	—	—	—	—		
"—" denotes a title that did not chart, or was not released in that territory.

=== Collaborative albums ===
List of collaborative albums, with selected chart positions
Title	Album details	Peak chart positions			Sales
Title	Album details	US	US R&B	US Rap	Sales
Product of the 80's (with Big Twins & Un Pacino)	Released: October 21, 2008; Label: Dirt Class; Formats: CD, digital download	—	—	—	—
Albert Einstein (with The Alchemist)	Released: June 11, 2013; Label: Infamous; Formats: CD, digital download	175	19	13	US: 10,000
Young Rollin Stonerz (with Boogz Boogetz)	Released: November 24, 2014; Label: Infamous; Formats: CD, digital download	—	—	—	—
"—" denotes a title that did not chart, or was not released in that territory.

=== EPs ===
List of extended plays, with selected chart positions
Title	Album details	Peak chart positions		
Title	Album details	US	US R&B	US Rap
The Ellsworth Bumpy Johnson EP	Released: April 19, 2011; Label: Self-released; Format: Digital download	—	—	—
Albert Einstein: P=mc2 Bonus EP (with The Alchemist)	Released: February 25, 2014; Label: Infamous; Formats: Digital download	—	—	—
"—" denotes a title that did not chart, or was not released in that territory.

=== Compilation albums ===
List of compilation albums, with selected chart positions
Title	Album details	Peak chart positions		
Title	Album details	US	US R&B	US Rap
The Most Infamous	Released: February 18, 2014; Label: Infamous; Formats: Digital download	—	—	—
"—" denotes a title that did not chart, or was not released in that territory.

=== Mixtapes ===
List of mixtapes, with year released
Title	Album details
H.N.I.C. Pt. 1 Mixtape	Released: 2000; Label: Self-released; Format: Digital download
Closed Session (with Illa Ghee)	Released: 2005; Label: Self-released; Format: Digital download
H.N.I.C. 2 Advance Mixtape	Released: 2008; Label: Self-released; Format: Digital download
Ultimate P	Released: September 26, 2009; Label: Self-released; Format: Digital download
H.N.I.C. 3: The Mixtape	Released: February 21, 2012; Label: Self-released; Format: Digital download
R.I.P. (1-3) (hosted by Ski Beatz)	Released: April 5, 2016; Label: Self-released; Format: Digital download
Hell Still On Earth (with Conway)	Released: September 11, 2016; Label: Griselda Records; Format: Digital download

== Singles ==
=== As lead artist ===
List of singles as a lead artist, with selected chart positions, showing year released and album name
Title	Year	Peak chart positions		Album
Title	Year	US R&B	US Rap	Album
"Keep It Thoro"	2000	97	17	H.N.I.C.
"Rock Dat Shit"	2000	—	33	H.N.I.C.
"Y.B.E. (Young Black Entrepreneurs)" (featuring B.G.)	2000	—	42	H.N.I.C.
"Mac 10 Handle"	2006	—	—	Return of the Mac
"Return of the Mac"	2007	—	—	Return of the Mac
"Stuck on You"	2007	91	—	Return of the Mac
"ABC"	2007	—	—	H.N.I.C. Pt. 2
"The Life"	2008	—	—	H.N.I.C. Pt. 2
"New Yitty"	2008	—	—	H.N.I.C. Pt. 2
"Stop Stressin'"	2008	—	—	Product of the 80's
"In the Smash" (featuring Twin Gambino)	2008	—	—	Product of the 80's
"Shed Thy Blood" (featuring Un Pacino)	2008	—	—	Product of the 80's
"Great Spitters" (featuring Cory Gunz)	2012	—	—	H.N.I.C. 3: The Mixtape
"Gangsta Love" (featuring Esther)	2012	—	—	H.N.I.C. 3
"Pretty Thug"	2012	—	—	H.N.I.C. 3
"Get Money" (featuring Boogz Boogetz)	2012	—	—	H.N.I.C. 3
"Money on Ya Head" (featuring Chinx Drugz and Boogz Boogetz)	2013	—	—	Non-album single
"Walk Out" (featuring DJ Premier)	2022	---	---	The Hegelian Dialectic 2: The Book of Heroine
"—" denotes a recording that did not chart.

=== As featured artist ===
List of singles as a featured artist, with selected chart positions, showing year released and album name
Title	Year	Peak chart positions			Album
Title	Year	US	US R&B	US Rap	Album
"5 Boroughs" (KRS-One featuring Buckshot, Cam'ron, Keith Murray, Killah Priest, Prodigy, Redman, Run and Vigilante)	1999	—	79	10	The Corruptor: The Soundtrack
"It's Over Now (Remix)" [112 featuring Prodigy]	2001				—N/a
"Hold You Down" (The Alchemist featuring Prodigy, Nina Sky and Illa Ghee)	2004	95	47	—	1st Infantry
"New York City" (Troy Ave featuring Raekwon, N.O.R.E. and Prodigy)	2013	—	—	—	New York City: The Album
"Chase the Paper" (50 Cent featuring Prodigy, Styles P and Kidd Kidd)	2014	—	—	—	Animal Ambition
"Drip" (Mike Delorean featuring Prodigy)	2016	—	—	—	—N/a
"SIGN OF SE7EN" (Rakim x Prodigy x X-Raided x Method Man x Big Twins)	2024	—	—	—	G.O.Ds NETWORK: REB7RTH
"—" denotes a recording that did not chart.

== Guest appearances ==
List of non-single guest appearances, with other performing artists, showing year released and album name
Title	Year	Other artist(s)	Album
"Too Young"	1990	Hi-Five	Hi-Five
"I Shot Ya (Remix)"	1995	LL Cool J, Keith Murray, Fat Joe, Foxy Brown	Mr. Smith
"Gusto"	1996	A+	The Latch-Key Child
"Recognize & Realize (Part 1)"	1996	Big Noyd	Episodes of a Hustla
"All Pro"	1996	Big Noyd	Episodes of a Hustla
"Infamous Mobb"	1996	Big Noyd	Episodes of a Hustla
"Usual Suspects"/"Usual Suspects (Stretch Armstrong Remix)"	1996	Big Noyd	Episodes of a Hustla
"Episodes of a Hustla"	1996	Big Noyd	Episodes of a Hustla
"Tres Leches (Triboro Trilogy)"	1998	Big Pun, Inspectah Deck	Capital Punishment
"Bulworth (They Talk About It While We Live It)"	1998	Method Man, Kam, KRS-One	Bulworth (soundtrack)
"Tha Game"	1998	Pete Rock, Raekwon, Ghostface Killah	Soul Survivor
"Family Ties (Remix)"	1999	Missin' Linx	—N/a
"Violators"	1999	L Boogie, Sonya Blade, Noreaga, Mysonne, Busta Rhymes	Violator: The Album
"Q.B.G"	1999	Funkmaster Flex, Kool G Rap	The Tunnel
"Don't Be a Follower"	2000	—N/a	Black and White (soundtrack)
"Basics"	2000	Tony Touch	The Piece Maker
"The Heat Is On"	2000	Screwball	Y2K: The Album
"Losin' Weight"	2000	Cam'ron	S.D.E.
"We Pledge Allegiance"	2000	Easy Mo Bee, Smif-N-Wessun	Now or Never: Odyssey 2000
"Queens Is"	2000	LL Cool J	G.O.A.T.
"The Grimey Way"	2000	Big Noyd	Lyricist Lounge 2
"Power Rap (Freestyle)"	2000	—N/a	Nas & Ill Will Records Presents QB's Finest
"Self-Conscience"	2000	Nas	Nas & Ill Will Records Presents QB's Finest
"New York, New York"	2001	Angie Martinez, DJ Clue	Up Close and Personal
"I Reps"	2001	Queen Pen, Cam'ron, DJ Clue	Conversations with Queen
"Livin' the Life"	2001	Jadakiss, Butch Cassidy	Violator: The Album, V2.0
"No Parts of Us"	2001	Benzino, Bobby Brown	The Benzino Project
"Thunn & Kicko"	2001	Cormega	The Realness
"Queens Day"	2001	Run-DMC, Nas	Crown Royal
"Crazy 8's"	2001	Lake, Germ, Jungle, Wiz, Blitz, Littles, Faul Monday	The 41st Side
"Get Back"	2001	Lake, Ammo, Tragedy Khadafi	The 41st Side
"Bang ta Dis (Remix)"	2002	Benzino, Bars n Hooks	The Benzino Remix Project
"Don't Make a Wrong Move"	2002	Snoop Dogg, Special Ed, Mr. Kane	Snoop Dogg Presents... Doggy Style Allstars Vol. 1
"Killa Queens"	2002	Infamous Mobb, Big Noyd	Special Edition
"Mobb Niggaz (The Sequel)"	2002	Infamous Mobb	Special Edition
"Where You At"	2002	Kool G Rap	The Giancana Story
"Something for All That"	2003	Big Noyd	Only the Strong
"All 4 the Luv of the $"	2003	Big Noyd	Only the Strong
"Rebel Music"	2003	Wyclef Jean	The Preacher's Son
"Untouchables"	2004	DJ Kay Slay, Raekwon, AZ	The Streetsweeper, Vol. 2
"Last Laugh"	2004	Cypress Hill, Twin	Till Death Do Us Part
"Dead Bodies"	2004	The Alchemist, Game	1st Infantry
"Tick Tock"	2004	The Alchemist, Nas	1st Infantry
"Whoop Your Ass"	2004	Snoop Dogg	Non-album single
"Don't Do It"	2004	Melbeatz, Godfather II	Rapper's Delight
"Hot Wheels"	2004	Grafh	The Oracle
"I Don't Know, Officer"	2005	50 Cent, Mase, Lloyd Banks, Spider Loc	Get Rich or Die Tryin' (soundtrack)
"Yap-Yap"	2005	Junior M.A.F.I.A.	RIOT MUZIK
"You Got It"	2006	The Alchemist	No Days Off
"I Betcha"	2006	The Alchemist, Kokane	No Days Off
"Stick & Move"	2006	Planet Asia	The Medicine
"Rotten Apple"	2006	Lloyd Banks, 50 Cent	Rotten Apple
"Serial Killer"	2006	50 Cent, 40 Glocc	Hip Hop Is Dead (G-Unit Radio Part 22)
"Queens"	2007	50 Cent, LL Cool J, Tony Yayo, Kool G Rap	—N/a
"Set Me Free"	2007	Havoc	The Kush
"Key to the City"	2008	The Alchemist, Nina Sky	The Alchemist's Cookbook
"Al Capone Zone"	2008	The Alchemist, Keak da Sneak	The Alchemist's Cookbook
"Hood Shit"	2008	Termnalogy	Politics as Usual
"Come Out"	2008	Tony Yayo	S.O.D.
"Trials of Life"	2008	Ghostface KIllah	The Wallabee Champ
"White Van"	2008	Jake One, Alchemist, Evidence	White Van Music
"Keep the Heels On"	2009	The Alchemist	Chemical Warfare
"Fuck Yall Niggaz"	2009	Tony Yayo, Lil' Fame, D-Tay	The Swine Flu 2
"On a Mission"	2009	Havoc	Hidden Files
"The Type"	2011	Currensy	Covert Coup
"Rollercoaster"	2011	Tony Yayo	Gun Powder Guru 4 (EP)
"Bottles Go Bang"	2011	N.O.R.E., Styles P	The N.O.R.E.aster EP
"Take a Bow"	2011	Jim Jones, Lloyd Banks, Sen City	Capo
"Nothing to Me"	2011	Mazaradi Fox	—N/a
"Killa Squad"	2011	Ox	Danger Zone
"Itz Aight"	2011	40 Glocc, Sam Scarfo	—N/a
"1, 2, 3 Grind"	2011	Lloyd Banks	The Cold Corner 2
"Running From"	2011	Trav	—N/a
"Martyr	2011	Slim the Mobster	War Music
"Fame"	2011	Evidence	Cats & Dogs
"We Mobb"	2011	French Montana, Waka Flocka Flame	Lock Out
"Dump Truck"	2012	Gangrene	Vodka & Ayahuasca
"21 Gun Salute"	2012	Big Bad 4-0	New World Agenda
"Body"	2012	Childish Gambino	—N/a
"Till The Angels Come"	2012	Domo Genesis, Freddie Gibbs	No Idols
"Turn Me Up"	2012	Boogz Boogetz	C.O.O.L. (Creating Our Own Lane)
"Something More"	2012	Xzibit	Napalm
"No Sunshine"	2012	French Montana, Chinx Drugz	Mac & Cheese 3
"Confessions of a Cash Register"	2013	Mac Miller	—N/a
"Grind Mode"	2013	Realm Reality	In the Grind We Trust
"Daydreams"	2013	Maurice Mobetta	M. v. B.
"Fish Meat"	2013	Durag Dynasty	360 Waves
"Pinky Ring"	2013	Statik Selektah	Extended Play
"Seven Series Triplets"	2013	Action Bronson, Raekwon	Saaab Stories
"Street Corner Freestyle"	2013	Tony Touch	The Piece Maker 3: Return of the 50 MCs
"Red & Gold"	2014	Blu, Phil da Agony, Mitchy Slick	Good to Be Home
"Uncut Raw"	2014	Havoc	Thirteen Reloaded
"90s Flow"	2014	DJ Kay Slay, Fat Joe, Ghostface Killah, Raekwon, Sheek Louch, McGruff, N.O.R.E., Lil' Fame, Rell	Rhyme or Die
"Respect"	2015	DJ Kay Slay, Raekwon, Papoose	Shadow Of The Sun
"Gun Holds a Drum"	2016	Havoc & The Alchemist	the Silent Partner
"Benz Window"	2016	Conway the Machine	Don't Get Scared Now
"Seniorities"	2016	Lloyd Banks, Vado	All or Nothing: Live It Up
"Rodney Little"	2017	Conway the Machine	G.O.A.T.
"Mizz"	2017	Elcamino	Elcamino
"Lifestyle of a Thug"	2017	Harry Fraud	The Coast
"Save Them"	2017	AZ, Raekwon	Do or Die 2
"The 3 Lyrical Ps"	2017	Sean Price, Styles P	Imperius Rex
"Real People"	2017	Masta Killa, KXNG Crooked	Loyalty Is Royalty
"Disrespekt"	2017	Statik Selektah	8
"Black Eminence"	2025	Smif-n-Wessun	Infinity
