= Mr. President =

Mr. President may refer to:

- Mr. President (title), a term of address applied to certain men holding the title of President or presiding over certain other governmental bodies

== Arts, entertainment, and media ==
=== Music ===
- Mr. President (musical), a 1962 musical by Irving Berlin
- "Mr. President", 1974 and 1981 songs by Dickie Goodman
- "Mr. President", a song by The Heptones from the 1977 album Party Time
- "Mr. President", song by Kylie Minogue from the 2014 album Kiss Me Once
- "Mr. President (Have Pity on the Working Man)", a song by Randy Newman from the 1974 album Good Old Boys
- "Mr. President", song by Prodigy from the 2017 album Hegelian Dialectic (The Book of Revelation)
- "Mr. President", a song by Janelle Monáe from Metropolis: The Chase Suite

=== Other arts, entertainment, and media ===
- El Señor Presidente (Mr. President), a 1946 novel by Miguel Ángel Asturias
  - El Señor Presidente (film), a 1970 film adaptation starring Pedro Buchardo
  - El Señor Presidente, a 1983 film adaptation directed by Manuel Octavio Gómez
  - El Señor Presidente, a 2007 film adaptation directed by Rómulo Guardia Granier
- Mr. President (band), a Eurodance group
- Mr. President (radio series), an American series of the 1940s and 1950s
- Mr. President (TV series), a 1987 American series
- Mr. President (board game), from the 3M bookshelf game series
- Mr. President!, a 2016 satirical video game about saving the president from assassination

== See also ==
- Dear Mr. President (disambiguation)
- Mrs. President (disambiguation)
- Welcome Mr. President, an Italian 2013 comedy film
