= Bumpy Johnson =

American crime boss in Harlem, New York (1905–1968)

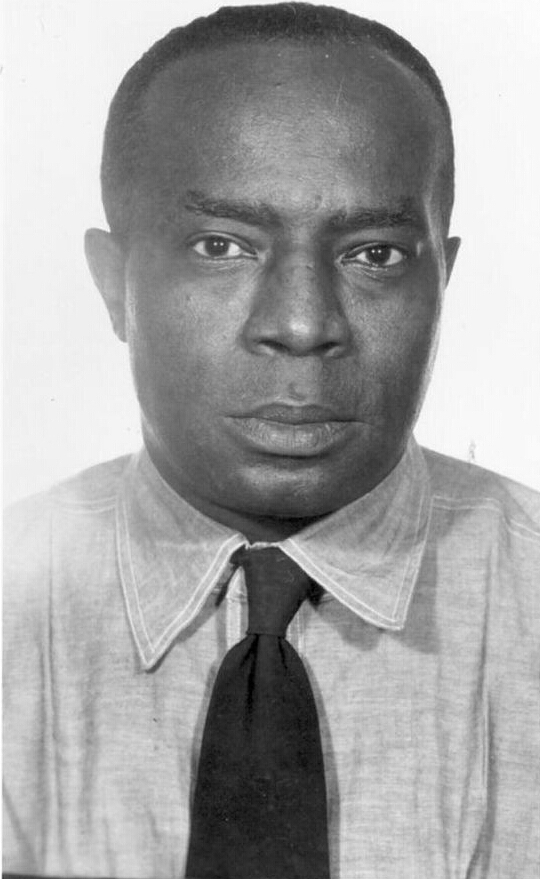
- Johnson in USP Leavenworth, 1954
- Born: Ellsworth Raymond Johnson; October 31, 1905; Charleston, South Carolina, U.S.
- Died: July 7, 1968 (aged 62); New York City, U.S.
- Resting place: Woodlawn Cemetery (Bronx, New York)
- Occupations: Crime boss, drug trafficker
- Spouse: Mayme Hatcher (m. 1948)
- Children: 2
- Conviction: Drug conspiracy (1952)
- Penalty: 15 years' imprisonment

Ellsworth Raymond "Bumpy" Johnson (October 31, 1905 – July 7, 1968) was an American crime boss in the Harlem neighborhood of New York City.

== Early life ==
Ellsworth Raymond "Bumpy" Johnson was born in Charleston, South Carolina, on October 31, 1905, to Margaret Moultrie and William Johnson. When he was 10, his older brother Willie was accused of killing a white man. Afraid of a possible lynch mob, his parents mortgaged their tiny home to raise money to send Willie up north to live with relatives. Johnson's nickname "Bumpy" is derived from a bump on the back of his head.

As Johnson grew older, his parents worried about his short temper and insolence toward white people, and, in 1919, he was sent to live with his older sister Mabel in Harlem. Johnson dropped out of high school and began working in casual jobs. Gangster William Hewett noticed Johnson, who began working for him.

== Career ==
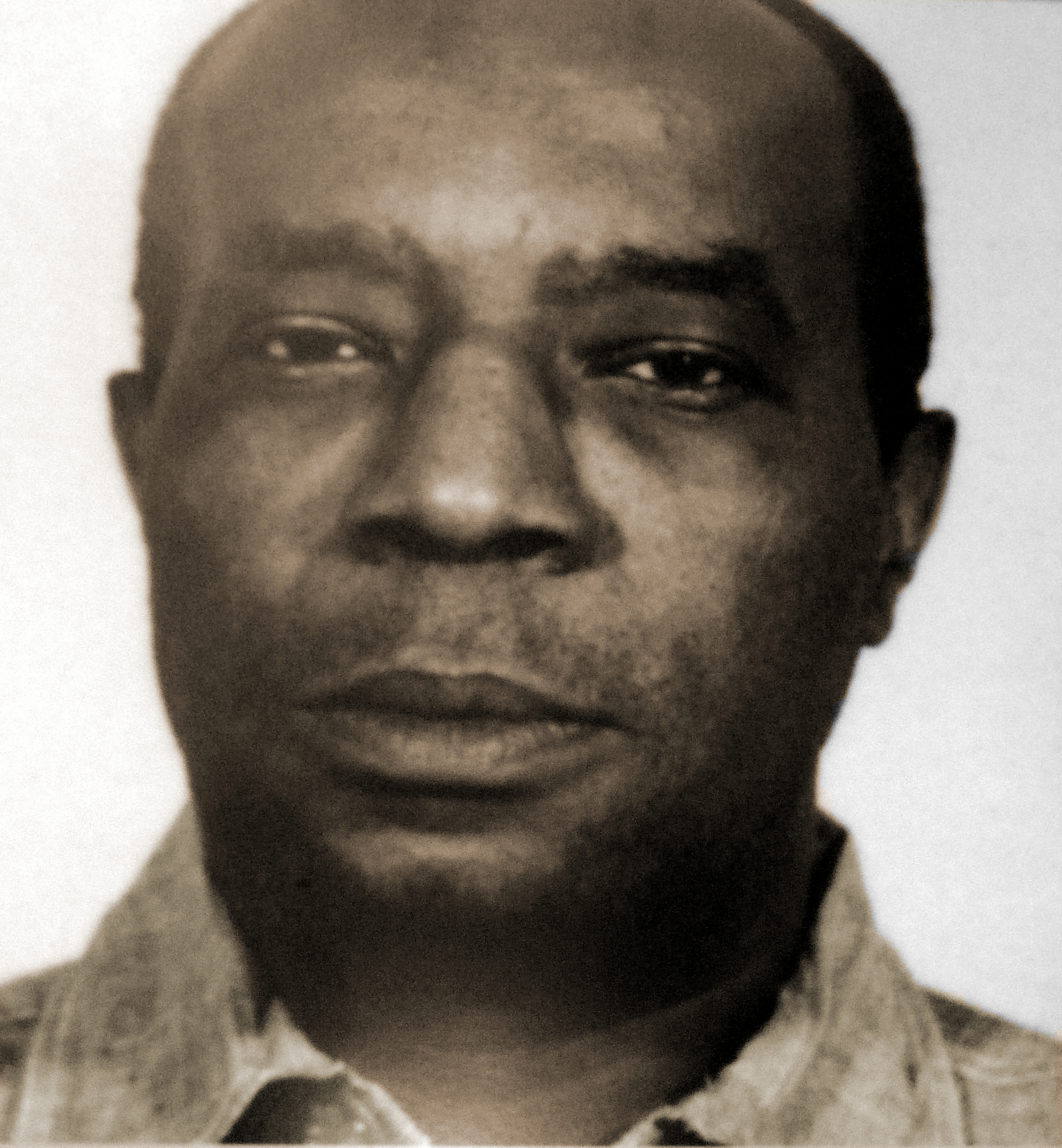
Johnson's mugshot at Alcatraz Federal Penitentiary. He was sent to Alcatraz in 1954 and was imprisoned until 1963

Johnson became an associate and enforcer for numbers queen Madame Stephanie St. Clair. In the 1930s, he quickly climbed the ranks to become her most trusted soldier. St. Clair incited a war with rival mob boss Dutch Schultz for control of Harlem's rackets. The war resulted in more than 40 murders and several kidnappings and ended with St. Clair's arrest and imprisonment. Johnson struck a deal with the Mafia after Schultz's 1935 murder through which he quickly built up his own organization in Harlem in exchange for favorable business deals.

In 1952, Johnson's activities were reported in the celebrity people section of Jet. That same year, he was sentenced to 15 years in prison for a drug conspiracy conviction related to heroin. Two years later, Jet reported in its crime section that Johnson began his sentence after losing an appeal. He served the majority of that sentence at Alcatraz Prison in San Francisco Bay, California, as inmate No. 1117, and was released in 1963 on parole.

Johnson was arrested more than 40 times and served two prison terms for narcotics-related charges. In December 1965, Johnson staged a sit-down strike at a police station in Harlem by refusing to leave as a protest against police surveillance of black neighborhoods. He was charged with "refusal to leave a police station" but was acquitted by a judge.

== Death ==
Johnson was under a federal indictment for drug conspiracy when he died of a heart attack on July 7, 1968, at the age of 62. He was at Wells Restaurant in Harlem shortly before 2 a.m., and the waitress had just served him coffee, a chicken leg, and hominy grits, when he fell over clutching his chest. He is buried in Woodlawn Cemetery in The Bronx, New York City.

== Personal life ==
Bumpy Johnson married Mayme Hatcher in October 1948, six months after their first meeting. Johnson had two daughters, one of whom was from another relationship. His wife died in May 2009, at the age of 94.

== In popular culture ==
=== Film ===
- In the 1971 film Shaft and its 1973 sequel Shaft's Big Score!, Moses Gunn portrays "Bumpy Jonas", a character based upon Johnson.
- In the 1972 film Come Back, Charleston Blue, the title character is loosely based on Bumpy Johnson, a criminal who is looked upon as a positive role model among the people.
- In the 1979 film Escape from Alcatraz, Paul Benjamin plays a character based on Bumpy Johnson, "English".
- In the 1984 film The Cotton Club, Laurence Fishburne plays a character based on Bumpy Johnson, "Bumpy Rhodes".
- In the 1991 film Mobsters, Russell Curry plays an African-American mob boss based on Johnson.
- In the 1997 film Hoodlum, Johnson is again portrayed by Fishburne.
- In the 2007 film American Gangster, Clarence Williams III plays Bumpy Johnson but is uncredited. He also had a role in Hoodlum.

=== Television ===
- In an episode of Unsolved Mysteries, it is reported that Johnson allegedly helped the three escapees of Alcatraz get to the shores of San Francisco. It is said that he arranged for a boat to pick the three men up out of the bay. The boat then dropped the escapees off at Pier 13 in San Francisco's Hunters Point District.
- Johnson (played by Forest Whitaker) is the main character of the Epix/MGM+ crime drama series Godfather of Harlem.

=== Music ===
- Rapper Prodigy titled his first full release after his release from prison in 2011 The Ellsworth Bumpy Johnson EP, which was followed by The Bumpy Johnson Album.
- The 2022 Central Cee EP No More Leaks includes a track titled "Bumpy Johnson".

== See also ==
- Frank Lucas
- List of people from Harlem
