= Arinze =

- Gender: Male
- Language: Igbo

Origin
- Origin: Nigeria
- Meaning: Thanks to
- Region of origin: South-east Nigeria

Other names
- Variant form: Arinzechukwu
- See also: Arinzechukwu

Arinze audio is a given name and a surname of Igbo origin. Arinze means "thanks to" as it is the short form of Arinzechukwu which means "thanks to God".

== Given name ==
- Arinzé Kene (born 1987), Nigerian-born British actor and playwright
- Arinze Stanley Egbengwu (born 1993), Nigerian artist, activist, engineer, and entrepreneur
- Arinze Obiora (born 1985), Nigerian high jumper
- Arinze Onuaku (born 1987), American basketball player
- Emmanuel Arinze Ifeajuna (1935–1967), Nigerian army major and high jumper

== Surname ==
- Francis Arinze (born 1932), Nigerian Roman Catholic cardinal
- Segun Arinze (born 1965), Nigerian actor and singer
