= Kareem Olamilekan =

Nigerian artist

Kareem Waris Olamilekan, also known as Waspa (born 2006 or 2007) is a Nigerian hyperrealism artist and art prodigy.

== Biography ==
Olamilekan was born in either 2006 or 2007. He lives in Lagos and attends the Ayowole Academy of Art. He began drawing at the age of 6. On 3 July 2018, in two hours, he drew a hyper-realistic portrait of French President Emmanuel Macron, during the president's visit to the Fela Kuti's New Africa Shrine in Lagos, Nigeria. President Macron was so impressed and touched by Olamilekan's work that he tweeted a short video featuring the young boy drawing. As a result, Olamilekan's work has received international recognition since then.

== Awards ==
- 2019 - won Taiwan's 22nd Fervent Global Love of Lives Award.

== See also ==
- Arinze Stanley Egbengwu
