= El Señor Presidente =

1946 novel by Guatemalan writer Miguel Ángel Asturias (1899–1974)

- The cover of the English translation, from Macmillan Press
- Author: Miguel Ángel Asturias
- Translator: Frances Partridge
- Language: Spanish
- Genre: Dictator novel
- Published: 1946 (Costa-Amic); 1963 (in English)
- Publication place: Guatemala
- Media type: Print (Hardback & Paperback)
- Pages: 321 (first edition, hardback)

El Señor Presidente (Mister President) is a 1946 novel written in Spanish by Nobel Prize-winning Guatemalan writer and diplomat Miguel Ángel Asturias. A landmark text in Latin American literature, El Señor Presidente explores the nature of political dictatorship and its effects on society. Asturias makes early use of a literary technique now known as magic realism. One of the most notable works of the dictator novel genre, El Señor Presidente developed from an earlier Asturias short story, written to protest social injustice in the aftermath of a devastating earthquake in the author's home town.

Although El Señor Presidente does not explicitly identify its setting as early twentieth-century Guatemala, the novel's title character was inspired by the 1898–1920 presidency of Manuel Estrada Cabrera. Asturias began writing the novel in the 1920s and finished it in 1933, but the strict censorship policies of Guatemalan dictatorial governments delayed its publication for thirteen years.

The character of the President rarely appears in the story but Asturias creates a number of other characters to show the terrible effects of living under a dictatorship. His use of dream imagery, onomatopoeia, simile, and repetition of particular phrases, combined with a discontinuous structure, which consists of abrupt changes of style and viewpoint, springs from surrealist and ultraist influences. The style of El Señor Presidente influenced a generation of Latin American authors. The themes of Asturias's novel, such as the inability to tell reality apart from dreams, the power of the written word in the hands of authorities, and the alienation produced by tyranny, center around the experience of living under a dictatorship.

On its eventual publication in Mexico in 1946, El Señor Presidente quickly met with critical acclaim. In 1967, Asturias received the Nobel Prize in Literature for his entire body of work. This international acknowledgment was celebrated throughout Latin America, where it was seen as a recognition of the region's literature as a whole. Since then, El Señor Presidente has been adapted for the screen and theater.

The US government, in particular the CIA, attempted to suppress the book through numerous front organisations, such as the Congress for Cultural Freedom

== Background ==
In a 1970 interview, the German critic Gunter W. Lorenz asked Miguel Ángel Asturias why he began to write and the novelist replied:

Yes, at 10:25 pm on the 25th of December in 1917, an earthquake destroyed my city. I saw something like an immense cloud conceal the enormous moon. I had been placed in a cellar, in a hole, in a cave or someplace else. It was then that I wrote my first poem, a song of farewell to Guatemala. Later, I was angered by the circumstances during which the rubble was cleared away and by the social injustice that became so bloodily apparent.

This experience, at the age of 18, led Asturias to write "Los mendigos políticos" ("The Political Beggars"), an unpublished short story that would later develop into his first novel, El Señor Presidente. Asturias began writing El Señor Presidente in 1922, while he was still a law student in Guatemala. He moved to Paris in 1923, where he studied anthropology at the Sorbonne under George Raynaud. While living in France, he continued to work on the book and also associated with members of the Surrealist movement as well as fellow future Latin American writers such as Arturo Uslar Pietri and the Cuban Alejo Carpentier. The novel was completed in 1933, shortly before Asturias returned to Guatemala.

Even though El Señor Presidente was written in France and is set in an unnamed Latin American country, governed by an unnamed President in the late nineteenth or early twentieth century, there is still plenty of support linking the novel to the Manuel Estrada Cabrera era in Guatemala. For example, as critic Jack Himelblau explains, "Asturias [...] wrote his novel primarily with his compatriots in mind, who, undoubtedly, had lived through the tyranny of Estrada Cabrera from 1898 to 1920." Estrada Cabrera was notorious for his brutal repression of dissent in Guatemala, and Asturias had been involved in protests against his rule in 1920. Asturias integrated and reworked incidents from Estrada Cabrera's dictatorship into the novel, such as the torture of a political adversary, who had been tricked "into believing that his innocent wife had been unfaithful to him".

Estrada Cabrera was eventually forced out of office as a result of popular disturbances and the intervention of U.S. and other foreign diplomats. Rather than go into exile, however, the ex-president opted to defend himself against criminal charges. In the ensuing trial, Asturias served as a legal secretary and so, as Gregory Rabassa's biographical sketch points out, he had the opportunity to base his own fictional leader—the President—on his observations of the disgraced Guatemalan dictator. As Asturias himself put it:

I saw him almost every day in the prison. And I found that there's no doubt that men like that have a special power over people. To the extent that while he was a prisoner people would say: "No, that can't be Estrada Cabrera. The real Estrada Cabrera escaped. This is some poor old man that they've locked up in here."

El Señor Presidente was not published until years after it was written. Asturias claims that Jorge Ubico y Castañeda, the dictator of Guatemala from 1931 to 1944, "prohibited its publication because his predecessor, Estrada Cabrera, was my Señor Presidente which meant that the book posed a danger to him as well". Additionally, because Ubico was Guatemala's dictator while the novel was being finished, critics have linked him with the characterization of the President in El Señor Presidente. As Himelblau notes, elements of the book "could easily have been interpreted as reflecting [...] General Ubico's dictatorship". The novel eventually first saw the light of day in Mexico, in 1946, at a time when Juan José Arévalo was serving as Guatemala's first democratically elected president.

Despite the manifest influence of Asturias's experiences in Guatemala under Estrada Cabrera and Ubico, and despite certain historical ties, critic Richard Callan observes that Asturias's "attention is not limited to his times and nation, but ranges across the world and reaches back through the ages. By linking his created world with the dawn of history, and his twentieth-century characters with myths and archetypes, he has anchored them to themes of universal significance." Asturias himself affirms that he "wrote El Señor Presidente without a social commitment". By this he means that unlike some of his other books, such as Leyendas de Guatemala (Legends of Guatemala) or Hombres de maíz (Men of Maize), "El Señor Presidente had a wider relevance because it did not focus so heavily on Guatemalan myths and traditions." Asturias depicts aspects of life that are common to all dictatorial regimes, and so establishes El Señor Presidente as one of his most influential works.

== Plot ==
=== Part one ===
The novel begins on the Cathedral Porch, where beggars spend their nights. One beggar, the Zany, is exhausted after being continually harassed about his deceased mother. When one of the President's loyal military men, Colonel Jose Parrales Sonriente, jeers the word "mother" at him, the Zany instinctively retaliates and murders the Colonel. The beggars are interrogated and tortured into agreeing that the retired General Eusebio Canales, once in the President's military, and the independent lawyer Abel Carvajal killed the Colonel because according to the President's men, there is no way "an idiot is responsible". Meanwhile, a delusional Zany flees "away down the shadowy streets in a paroxysm of mad terror".

A rare glimpse of the President shows him ordering Miguel Angel Face, sometimes referred to as the President's "favourite", to help General Canales flee before he is arrested in the morning for the murder of Sonriente. The President, who presumably orchestrated the accusations for his own purposes, wants Canales to flee because "running away would be a confession of guilt".

At the Two Step, a local tavern, Miguel Angel Face meets Lucio Vásquez, a policeman, and is inspired to tell Vásquez that he is kidnapping General Canales's daughter, Camila, as "a ruse to deceive the watchful authorities". He claims to be kidnapping Camila to cover up the truth of Canales's escape. Later, Vásquez meets with his friend Genaro Rodas, and upon leaving a bar they see the Zany. To Genaro Rodas's horror, Vásquez shoots the Zany. The aftermath of this scene is witnessed by Don Benjamin, a puppet-master, whose "puppets took the tragedy as their theme". Genaro Rodas returns home and discusses the murder of the Zany with his wife, Fedina de Rodas, and informs her that the police plan to arrest Canales in the morning. Meanwhile, Canales leaves Miguel Angel Face's home, exhausted and anxious about fleeing the country. Later that evening, Canales escapes safely while the police ransack his home and Miguel Angel Face sneaks in to bring Camila safely to the Two Step.

=== Part two ===
In the early morning, Fedina de Rodas rushes to Canales's house in an attempt to save him from arrest for the murder of Colonel Sonriente. She arrives too late and is found by the Judge Advocate, an aide to the President. He arrests her as an accomplice in Canales's escape, and tortures her in hopes of learning Canales's location. The soldiers smear lime on her breasts before giving her back her baby, which causes its death as it refuses to feed from "the sharpness of the lime".

Back at the Two Step, Miguel Angel Face visits Camila. He tries to find her a home with her aunts and uncles but they all refuse to take her in for fear of losing their friends and being associated with "the daughter of one of the President's enemies". More is revealed of Miguel Angel Face's complex character and the struggle between his physical desires for Camila and his desire to become a better person in a world ruled by terror.

Camila grows very ill and a boy is sent to inform Miguel Angel Face that her condition has worsened. He dresses quickly and rushes to the Two Step to see her. Eventually relieved of charges by the President, Fedina de Rodas is purchased by a brothel, and when it is discovered that she is holding her dead baby in her arms, she is placed in a hospital. Miguel Angel Face informs Major Farfan, who is in the service of the President, that there is a threat to his life. By this act saving a man in danger, Angel Face hopes "God would grant him Camila's life in exchange". General Canales escapes into a village and, assisted by three sisters and a smuggler, crosses the frontier of the country after saving the sisters by killing a doctor who harassed them with the payment of an absurd debt.

=== Part three ===
A student, a sacristan and Abel Carvajal, together in a prison cell, talk because they are "terrified of the silence" and "terrified of the darkness". Carvajal's wife runs all over town, visiting the President and influential figures such as the Judge Advocate, begging for her husband's release because she is left in the dark regarding what has happened to him. Carvajal is given a chance to read his indictment but, unable to defend himself against falsified evidence, is sentenced to execution.

Miguel Angel Face is advised that if he really loves her then Camila can be spared "by means of the sacrament of marriage" and the two of them are soon married. Camila is healing and struggling with the complexities of her new marriage. General Canales dies suddenly in the midst of plans to lead a revolution when he is falsely informed that the President has attended his daughter's wedding.

The President runs for re-election, championed in a bar by his fawning supporters, while Angel Face is entrusted with an international diplomatic mission. Camila and Angel Face share an emotional parting. Major Farfan intercepts Angel Face once he reaches the port and arrests him on the President's orders. Angel Face is violently beaten and imprisoned and an impostor takes his place on the departing ship. Camila, now pregnant, waits anxiously for letters from her husband. When she is past hope, Camila moves to the countryside with her young boy, whom she calls Miguel. Angel Face becomes the nameless prisoner in cell 17. He thinks constantly of Camila as the hope of seeing her again is the "last and only thing that remained alive in him" and ultimately dies heartbroken when he is falsely told that she has become the President's mistress.

=== Epilogue ===
The Cathedral Porch stands in ruins and prisoners who have been released are quickly replaced by other unfortunate souls. The puppet-master, Don Benjamin, has been reduced to madness because of the environment of terror he has been made to endure. Readers are given one more glimpse of the maddening state of life under a dictatorship. The epilogue concludes with a more hopeful tone, which is seen through a "mother's voice telling her rosary" which concludes with the Kyrie eleison; the call for the "Lord to have Mercy".

== Characters ==
=== Major characters ===
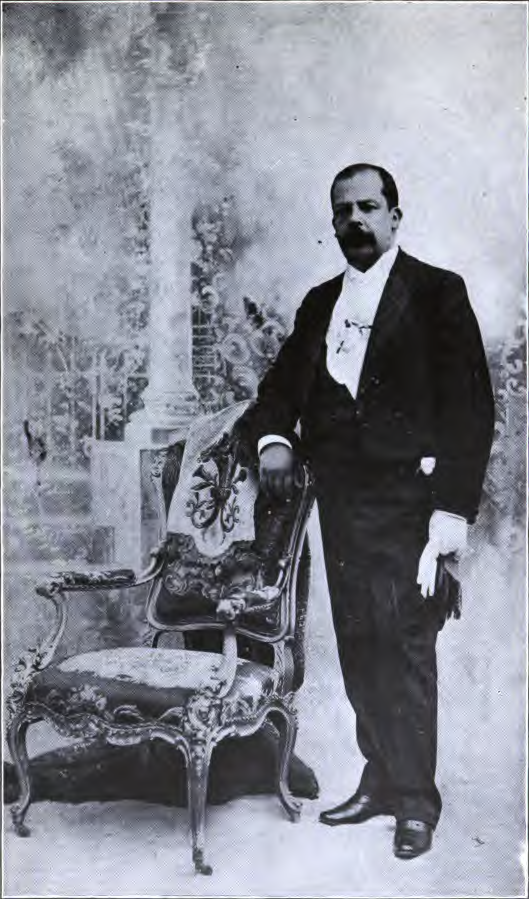
Manuel Estrada Cabrera, the inspiration for Asturias's titular President

==== President ====
The fact that the novel's title character, the President, is never named gives him a mythological dimension, rather than the personality of a specific Guatemalan dictator. Literary scholar Kevin Bauman notes that readers are not let into the mind of the President; instead his appearance is "continually re-evaluated, re-defined, and, ultimately, re-constructed according to his perception by others, similar to Asturias's own novelistic (re)vision of Estrada Cabrera's regime". According to literary critic Hughes Davies, the President "represents political corruption but his presentation as an evil deity who is worshiped in terms that mockingly echo religious ritual elevates him to a mythical plane" and he is "an inverted image of both the Christian and Mayan deities since he is the source only of death". The dictator also has an element of mystery about him—it seems that no one knows where he is because he occupies several houses on the outskirts of the town. Mystery also surrounds the questions of when and how he sleeps. In the novel, rumors abound that he sleeps beside the telephone with a whip in his hand while others claim that he never sleeps at all. Because the appearance of the President is infrequent in the novel, readers' perceptions of him are formed through other, often minor, characters and episodes. As such, literary critic Himelblau states that "the novel does not develop the figure of the President as a fictive personage, does not follow the President through a series of actions or diegetic complications that lead to psychological-existential changes or transformations of his character".

==== Miguel Angel Face ====
Miguel Angel Face (orig. Spanish Miguel Cara de Ángel) is the novel's complex protagonist. He is introduced as the President's confidential adviser; there are many references to him as the President's favorite and he is repeatedly described "as beautiful and as wicked as Satan". As the plot proceeds readers see his struggle to remain loyal to the dictator in the face of the regime's increasingly horrific acts. Angel Face is faced with the challenge of reconciling his position of power among a terrorized people with his desire to fulfill a higher moral purpose. In the words of literary critic Richard Franklin, he "struggles to affirm his absolute existence and to relate this to an authentic self". Angel Face's linguistic intensity often reflects his inner moral struggle:

'An animal makes no mistake in its sexual reckonings,' he thought. 'We piss children into the graveyard. The trumpets of Judgement Day—very well, it won't be a trumpet. Golden scissors will cut through the continuous stream of children. We men are like pigs' tripes stuffed with mincemeat by a demon butcher to make sausages. And when I mastered my own nature so as to save Camila from my desire, I left a part of myself unstuffed; that's why I feel empty, uneasy, angry, ill caught in a trap. Woman is the mincemeat into which man stuffs himself like a pig's tripes for his own gratification. What vulgarity'

==== General Eusebio Canales ====
General Eusebio Canales (alias Chamarrita or Prince of Arms) is forced into exile after being accused of the murder of Colonel José Parrales Sonriente. He appears to be organizing a guerrilla attack on the President, but dies of a broken heart after reading a false news report detailing his daughter's wedding to Miguel Angel Face, at which the President was apparently present. The character of the General comes into clearer focus while he is on the road to exile. Canales's road to exile also introduces readers to the desperate financial situation of three sisters who are being taken advantage of by a doctor who visited their ailing mother. This episode demonstrates that corruption and malice exist not just in the capital city but also in rural villages.

==== Camila ====
Camila, General Canales's daughter, is (somewhat reluctantly) rescued by Miguel Angel Face, when none of her relatives will take her in upon the flight of her father. Eventually Angel Face chooses Camila over his former master, the President. The two marry and she gives birth to his son, but only once Angel Face has disappeared. She and her son, whom she names Miguel, are last seen having moved to the countryside to escape the President's influence. She is the very picture of the adolescent who has been denied even the smallest margin of liberty, as critic Callan observes: "when Camila was thought to be dying a priest came to administer the sacrament of Penance. Her girlish faults stand out in the contrast with the evil that weighs upon the city. Indeed, one of the things she mentions in her confession is no fault at all: she went horseback riding astride, in the presence of someg Indians."

==== Zany ====
The Zany (orig. Spanish el Pelele), also translated as the Idiot by some critics, appears only in the first four chapters and again at the end of chapter seven but serves a critical function in the novel. The Zany, who "looked like a corpse when he was asleep" and had eyes that "saw nothing, felt nothing" is critical to establishing the tone of the novel and triggering the novel's action. Critic John Walker argues that, by "choosing the Idiot as a representative of the innocent, the a-political, who suffer the abuses of a totalitarian regime [...] Asturias shows how dictatorship corrupts people and destroys their values to the extent that compassion for one's companion in distress ceases to exist." In fact, it becomes clear that the only happiness that the Zany experiences is through the memory of his dead mother. Asturias then shows how el Pelele, a mother-loving figure, "suffers at the hands of those who, long under the domination of the over-aggressive father figure, lack love and pity". Furthermore, el Pelele is a tool that allows readers to see the psychological effects of living under a dictatorship ruled by terror. His murderous act seems to trigger the subsequent events of the novel and to impact on all the characters. Also important is the fact that the one moment of complete happiness experienced by the Zany in the novel takes place while he is in a dream-like state. Walker argues that this serves to highlight the harsh, nightmarish world of reality in which he has been forced to live.

=== Minor characters ===
The novel includes a host of minor characters who, in Richard Franklin's words, "grope for the means to assert the validity of self and to anchor this individuality in a nightmare which constantly faces it with black nothingness". These characters range from Colonel José Parrales Sonriente, otherwise known as the "man with the little mule", whose murder at the Cathedral Porch opens the novel, to a series of beggars, prisoners, minor officials, relatives, flatterers, barkeepers and prostitutes. Some of these are tragic figures, such as Fedina de Rodas, who readers see tortured and then sold to a brothel while she still clutches her dead baby in her arms. Others, however, provide comic relief. Sometimes they have colorful or playful names or nicknames, such as "Flatfoot" (a beggar), the "Talking Cow" (a woman who delivers a speech of praise to the President), or Doña Benjamin VenJamón, who, with her husband the puppet-master Don Benjamin, closes the novel with a lament for the demise of the cathedral porch.

== Genres ==
=== Magic realism ===
According to scholar Luis Leal, in the genre of magic realism, "the writer confronts reality and tries to untangle it, to discover what is mysterious in things, in life, in human acts." Magic realist writing does not create imaginary creatures or places; instead, the writer tries to display "the mysterious relationship between man and his circumstances". Leal further points out that in magic realism, "key events have no logical or psychological explanation. The magical realist does not try to copy the surrounding reality or to wound it but to seize the mystery that breathes behind things." He also clarifies that "magical realism is not magic literature either. Its aim, unlike that of magic, is to express emotions, not to evoke them".

To many scholars, El Señor Presidente is a landmark Latin American novel because of Asturias's early use of magic realism, a literary technique often employed by acclaimed Latin American writers such as Gabriel García Márquez. In an interview with Asturias, Gunter Lorenz heralded Asturias as the inventor of magic realism, and even as its most successful practitioner. Asturias himself defines this style not as "a concrete reality but a reality that arises from a definitely magical imagination ... in which we see the real disappear and the dream emerge, in which dreams are transformed into a tangible reality". Richard Franklin argues that magic realism is most evident in Asturias's exploration and depiction of the innermost reality of the human mind. This exploration is combined with "the material content of an urban mass caught in the grip of an iron regime" throughout the novel. Franklin goes on to herald the synthesis of these two elements as "a real contribution to the novelistic genre of America".

=== Dictator novel ===
Asturias first wrote El Señor Presidente in response to the dictatorial rule of Manuel Estrada Cabrera. Because Asturias spent a decade writing the novel, the delay in its publication, and the fact that it never names its eponymous President, many scholars have noted that it could equally be taken to apply to the subsequent regime of Jorge Ubico. Moreover, since the novel's publication, it has been used to critique dictatorial rule throughout Latin America. In its examination of the nature of dictatorial power in general, it helped initiate the new genre of the dictator novel. As literary critic Gerald Martin argues, El Señor Presidente is "the first real dictator novel".

The dictator novel is a genre that has developed as a vehicle for Latin American writers to critique concentrated authority. Assistant Professor of Spanish at Walsh University, Jorge J Barrueto, argues that El Señor Presidente has been heralded as epitomizing dictatorship, "a phenomenon perceived to be a natural and inherent trait in the region". According to Garcia Calderon, the legacy of colonialism in Latin America has often led to the rise of an absolute authority, which seeks to contain a nation's inner conflict. Once in power, the man in charge often seeks complete control; he often amends constitutions, dismantling laws which previously prevented his re-election. For example, in 1899 General Manuel Estrada Cabrera altered the Guatemalan Constitution which had previously prohibited his re-election. Typically, however, dictator novels attempt to examine the abstract nature of authority figures and to question the idea of authority in general instead of focusing on the rule of a particular dictator.

Asturias's text marks a dramatic shift in narrative writing. Precursors such as Domingo Sarmiento's Facundo (1845) were judged on how adequately they reflected reality. With its stylized magic realism, Asturias's El Señor Presidente broke from this realist paradigm—it is an avant-garde novel that laid the foundation for many other authors to develop what is now a broad and extensive genre.

== Style ==
According to Latin American literary scholar Gerald Martin, Asturias's El Señor Presidente, which was written and published before the Latin American Boom of the 1960s, uses a style now classified as the "new novel" or "new narrative". In this novel, Asturias breaks from the historic and realist style that dominated novels at the time. Martin argues that the novel "exemplifies more clearly than any other novel the crucial link between European Surrealism and Latin American Magical Realism. It is, indeed, the first fully-fledged Surrealist novel in Latin America."

Richard Franklin contends that on occasion surrealist writing obscures meaning, but in El Señor Presidente Asturias avoids this flaw. His combination of rationalism with "a world of forms" creates "an imagery which reveals a deeper reality, one which is more deeply rooted in the human psyche". As such, Asturias's surrealist style highlights the modern disintegration of long-standing belief systems. Literary scholar Gabriele Eckart gives as an excellent example of Asturias's surrealist style his portrayal of The Zany's psychic processes in which "language sometimes breaks apart into incomprehensible sounds". This allows Asturias to present the real and imaginary, as well as the communicable and incommunicable, as non-contradictory. Himelblau also highlights how El Señor Presidente projects "reality in relative, fluid terms—that is it allows its characters to disclose the temporal setting of the novel's fictional events". In this regard, then, Himelblau notes that El Señor Presidente "is also, as far as we are aware, the first novel in Spanish America that seeks to render fictional reality of time as a function of point of view". The novel defies traditional narrative style by inserting numerous episodes that contribute little or nothing to the plot as the characters in these episodes often appear inconsistently. Instead of relaying the book's themes through characters, Asturias uses repetition of motifs and a mythical substructure to solidify the book's message.

Asturias employs figurative language to describe dream imagery and the irrational. Literary critic Hughes Davies points out that Asturias frequently appeals to the reader's auditory senses. Asturias's often incantatory style employs "unadulterated poetry to reinforce his imagery through sound". This helps readers to understand the physical as well as the psychological aspects of the novel. According to Knightly, "few of Asturias's characters have much psychological depth; their inner conflicts tend to be externalized and played out at the archetypal level". More significantly, Asturias was the first Latin American novelist to combine stream of consciousness writing and figurative language. Hughes Davies argues that from the outset of El Señor Presidente, the gap between words and reality is exemplified through onomatopoeia, simile and repetition of phrases. Knightly notes that "animistic elements surface occasionally in the characters' stream of consciousness". For example, in the chapter "Tohil's Dance", Tohil, the God of Rain in Maya mythology, is imagined by Angel Face as arriving "riding on a river of pigeons' breasts which flowed like milk". In Angel Face's vision, Tohil demands a human sacrifice and is content only so long as he "can prevail over men who are hunters of men". Tohil pronounces: "Henceforth there will be neither true death nor true life. Now dance." As Knightly explains, this scene follows the President's orders for Miguel Angel Face to go on a mission that ends in his death, and is "a sign of the President's evil nature and purposes". Davies contends that these literary techniques, when "combined together with a discontinuous structure, give the text its surrealistic and nightmarish atmosphere".

== Major themes ==
=== Reality vs. dream ===
Asturias blurs the separation between dream and reality throughout El Señor Presidente, making it one of the novel's most prominent themes. Latin American writer and critic Ariel Dorfman notes that the mixing of dream and reality is partly a result of Asturias's frequent use of figurative language. This stylistic choice is reflected in the content of the story itself, which suggests that an important effect of dictatorial power is the blurring of dreams and reality. Dorfman also notes that the President is sustained by fear, which further blurs the distinction between reality and dream. This fear grants him the voluntary or involuntary support of others, enabling the President to exercise his mandates. Dorfman asserts that the President's use of fear elevates his mandates to legends. These legends are then able to "impose itself upon reality because men live it fully in a way to make sense of their humanity". One example of this theme, elucidated by Eckart, is a series of scenes leading to the arrest of the lawyer Carvajal. When the President decides to blame Carvajal for the murder of Colonel Sonriente, it is clear that Carvajal is confounded by the charges. Moreover, despite being a lawyer, Carvajal is unable to defend himself during the sham trial with "the members of the tribunal so drunk that they cannot hear him". As Eckart asserts, "to be captured and tortured without ever knowing why is another horrible feature of a dictatorship. For the victim, reality unexpectedly becomes unreality, no longer comprehensible by a logical mind." Therefore, the use of fear by a dictatorship blurs the line between reality and dream for the people being ruled.

Asturias's ambiguous use of detail adds to the confusion between reality and dream. For example, the title pages of parts one and two state that they take place between April 21 and 27. Part three, on the other hand, occurs over "Weeks, Months, Years". While this time-scale initially appears very specific, no year is indicated. Furthermore, the novel is set in a country similar to Guatemala and includes references to Maya gods (such as in the chapter "Tohil's Dance") but no direct statement by any character confirms this. Bauman argues that Asturias, by "preferring instead to distance himself from the immediate historical reality and focus critical light on the internal problems", attends to what "he sees there". This enables Asturias to address a wider audience, not restricted to Guatemalans, that can relate individually to the experience of living under dictatorial rule.

In obscuring reality, truth becomes unclear. As literary critic Mireille Rosello notes, it is the President who decides what is true, denying any other opinion, even if other characters witness an event with their own eyes or ears. Unlike the characters in the novel, readers are aware that the characters are relying on a notion of truth or reality that no longer exists under the dictatorship of the President. "Truth" does not exist before the President puts it into words, and even at that, the only "truth" under dictatorial rule is the words the President is speaking at any given moment—one cannot even safely repeat the President's versions of events. The characters are thus left unaware of what constitutes the "truth".

=== Writing and power ===
A major theme of the dictator novel concerns the use of writing as a medium of power. In El Señor Presidente, Asturias uses language to challenge dictatorial power. Throughout the novel the reader observes the authority of the President over the people through his control of what they write. In the chapter "The President's Mail-Bag", a stream of letters informs the President of peoples' actions. While many are "writing the truth" and turning in their fellow citizens, many others feel that "it is not safe to trust to paper". Writing is closely linked to authority and is a means to solidify power, because language can be manipulated into lies that eventually kill. For example, the President orders a newspaper to include the false statement that he attended the wedding of Camila, the daughter of General Canales. When the General reads these words and perceives them as truth, his heart is broken and he subsequently dies. Miguel Angel Face is also killed by the manipulation of words: he is told that Camila has become the President's mistress, and upon hearing this falsified news, he loses the will to live. These episodes in the novel demonstrate how closely language, the written word, and power are linked. The characters in El Señor Presidente lose their sense of reality, making it difficult for them to know whom to trust. As Rosello argues, "in this state of terror, language is deliberately used as a means of seducing the addressee into harmlessness, and has lost its function of conveying information".

=== Hope ===
In El Señor Presidente, hope is suppressed by the dictatorship. As the Judge Advocate states in the novel, "the President's first rule of conduct is never to give grounds for hope, and everyone must be kicked and beaten until they realise the fact". It can be argued that Camila represents hope in the novel because both her father and husband were able to persevere under the dictatorship by thinking of her; however, the President destroys this sense of hope with false stories. When the thought of her loyalty is eliminated, both her father and husband die because they have lost the hope of returning to her. Furthermore, Camila's happiness with her child and their escape to the countryside can be seen as the one glimpse of hope in an otherwise dark and disturbing ending. For critic Jean Franco, it is love that offers what little hope there is in the novel: "The system is undermined only by love—the love of an idiot for his mother, a woman trying desperately to save her husband from death."

=== Tyranny and alienation ===
The theme of tyranny and alienation shows how a dictatorship not only alienates and "others" the people in the country, but also prevents the country itself from achieving European modernization. In a 1967 essay, literary critic Ariel Dorfman argues that "dictatorship, which in El Señor Presidente manifested itself in the political realm, is now a dictatorship of fire of the word, but always a tyranny that men themselves ask for, adore, and help to build". Dorfman also notes that "The 'little human bundles' of Asturias's world end up destroying themselves, being disintegrated by the very forces that they themselves spoke." By this he means that the characters are undone by their own actions and words as the President uses and twists them. The tyranny of language perversely parallels the political oppression which is omnipresent in Asturias's world. Richard Franklin argues that "in a philosophical sense, Asturias has eloquently affirmed the validity of individual experience".

Asturias shows how, under the conditions of dictatorship, characters slowly lose their human identities. The Zany, for instance, while fleeing the city, is described as running "aimlessly, with his mouth opened and his tongue hanging out, slobbering and panting". Just a few lines later, the Zany is "whin[ing] like an injured dog". In what is in part a critique of the book, Jorge Barrueto argues that El Señor Presidente depicts Latin America as a whole as "Other". Everyone from the President to the Zany displays this "otherness" as they cannot be civilized. Dictatorship produces Otherness, by dehumanizing its subjects, but is also itself presented as barbaric, absurd, and no more than an "imitation of the European ways". Thanks to phenomena such as dictatorship, Latin America appears to be a land where "Otherness" prevails and for this reason Latin America cannot "evolve" or reach truly European levels of modernity. For Barrueto, "this narrative's goal is to prove that Latin American societies, though they are aware of the blueprint of Modernity, are unable to act accordingly."

=== Fertility and destruction ===
According to Latin American literature scholar Richard Callan, the dichotomy between destruction and fertility is embodied in the opposition between the President and Miguel Angel Face. While the President represents sterility and destruction, his favorite, Miguel Angel Face, embodies fertility, a positive and generative force of nature. Callan notes that Miguel Angel Face's transformation from the President's favorite to a positive generative force is not deliberate. Instead, Callan argues that "it results from the birth of true love in his formerly barren heart. However, he is too engrossed in his love to notice the shift in his relationship with the President." The President, not surprisingly, identifies himself candidly with death. Examples from the novel include the death sentences he gives to Abel Carvajal (for a crime the President is fully aware the man did not commit) and to Lucio Vasquez, a man in his service that carried out his wish for the Zany to be killed and yet is still executed. In contrast to the President, Callan highlights Miguel Angel Face's association with love. The love that Miguel Angel Face develops for Camila identifies him with love and life, and leads to procreation—the birth of his son. Rosello argues that even before his transformation, Miguel Angel Face was aware of the President's destructive nature. As such, Rosello argues that Miguel Angel Face "knew from the beginning that the only 'safety' in the President's world is a form of self destruction: only by losing his identity and letting the President's mind invade his own could he hope to remain alive". So, when he failed to comply, he did indeed lose his life.

== Reception ==
In Guatemala, El Señor Presidente received significant attention from the date of its first publication. Mostly this was from other left-wing writers and intellectuals, who recognized and praised both its stylistic innovation and its political commitment, if sometimes with the complaint that the novel was overly influenced by European modernism. But, as Dante Liano observes, "those in power have not been able to stand Asturias's voice".

Critical reception elsewhere in Latin America was also enthusiastic. One of the book's first reviewers was María Rosa Oliver, writing in the influential Argentine journal Sur shortly after the novel's second edition was produced in Buenos Aires. She particularly praises the plot: the fact that the novel is more than simply a lyrical still life. Rather, she argues, El Señor Presidente "stirs our five senses." And her conclusion stresses the book's Latin American qualities, arguing that it "enchants us, stirs us, moves us, and softens us all at the same time, producing much the same effect as when we travel, eyes and heart wide open, around these Latin American lands or the pages that tell their history."

Before long the novel's fame spread around the world. The first award Asturias received for El Señor Presidente was the French Prix du Meilleur Livre Étranger in 1952. El Señor Presidente has steadily garnered further acclaim. In the words of literary scholar Jack Himelblau, the book is "an avant-garde and critically significant novel in the history of Spanish-American fiction" and Latin American history and literature scholar Charles Macune includes El Señor Presidente in a list of prominent translated Latin American novels. For Macune, novels and novelists of Latin America are "both history makers as well as reflections of the region's history". Unlike Latin American newspapers and archival materials, translated Latin American novels are far more accessible to readers without a knowledge of Spanish. In fact, Macune shows that El Señor Presidente has been well-received not only in its original Spanish but also in its English translation.

=== Nobel Prize ===
In December 1967 Asturias won the Nobel Prize in Literature for his life's work, including El Señor Presidente. Upon receiving the prize, he gave a lecture regarding Latin American literature as both "testimony" and "instrument for struggle". In particular, he spoke about the possibility of forging a new style of novel in Latin America, drawing on the region's indigenous heritage. This new style would make the novel a vehicle of hope and light in what he termed "this night that threatens us now". It would be "the affirmation of the optimism of those writers that defied the Inquisition, opening a breach in the conscience of the people for the march of the Liberators".

The Nobel Prize Committee, in awarding the prize, described El Señor Presidente in the following terms:

This magnificent and tragic satire criticizes the prototype of the Latin American dictator who appeared in several places at the beginning of the century and has since reappeared, his existence being fostered by the mechanism of tyranny which, for the common man, makes every day a hell on earth. The passionate vigour with which Asturias evokes the terror and distrust which poisoned the social atmosphere of the time makes his work a challenge and an invaluable aesthetic gesture.

Asturias's home country celebrated his international recognition. In Guatemala his face soon adorned postage stamps, a street was named after him, and he received a medal. According to Kjell Strömberg in The 1967 Prize, "the whole of his little country was given over to rejoicing". Further admiration was expressed throughout Latin America, where Asturias's Nobel Prize was viewed as an accomplishment for Latin American literature as a whole, rather than the achievement of a single author or country. As scholar Richard Jewell notes, there had been substantial criticism that Latin American writers were being ignored by the Nobel committee. Beginning with Miguel Ángel Asturias in 1967, however, the academy selected four Latin American writers within twenty-four years.

Biographer Gregory Rabassa, who has translated other works by Asturias, highlights the effects of the Nobel Prize on Asturias's subsequent work, saying, "[h]is winning the Nobel Prize for Literature in 1967 gave him a long-awaited financial independence that ... enabled him to withdraw to his writing and the many aims and possibilities that [had] been on his mind for so many years".

== Adaptations ==
El Señor Presidente has been adapted into three Spanish-language films and one play. The first of the films, filmed in black and white, was made in 1970, by Argentine director Marcos Madanes. It was originally shown at the 1970 Venice Film Festival. The cast included Pedro Buchardo as the President, Luis Brandoni as Miguel and Alejandra Da Passano as Camila. As in Asturias's novel, the action is instigated when the village idiot kills a jeering army colonel, and in response, the president decides to blame the murder on a political adversary, but from that point on the film diverges from the novel. In the film, an operative is sent to spread rumors about the accused but instead he falls in love with the accused man's daughter. Once this happens, the operative defies his loyalty to the president and helps the daughter and her father incite a revolution with what he knows about the corrupt leader. Asturias himself complained about the film: he "sent a telegram to the Venice Film Festival denying permission to show the feature, but the letter arrived a day late. The unfortunate audience then had to endure this malodorous melodrama."

El Señor Presidente was adapted for the stage by playwright Hugo Carrillo, and first performed in a production of the Compañía de Arte Dramático de la Universidad Popular directed by Rubén Morales at the twelfth Festival of Guatemalan Theatre in 1974. It was a great popular success, with over 200 performances during its ten-month run, much longer than the two months of weekend performances that were standard for the festival, and the run broke Central American box office records. The production later toured Central America and other groups have also performed it, so that over 50,000 people have seen the play in over eight other countries besides Guatemala. Carrillo was notably concerned about the staging of the play by others; he grew angry at a Salvadoran production that changed a few scenes, and casting differences with Joseph Papp led to the cancellation of the play at the 1987 New York Latin American Festival (this canceled production was the origin of the English translation of the play, written by Margarita Kénefic, a student of Carrillo).

The play was also critically acclaimed, receiving many awards and has been written of as the zenith of a "Golden Age" of Guatemalan theatre. The play engaged the politics of the time (the Institutional Democratic Party was then in power), and Carrillo felt it necessary at first to attribute the script to the pseudonym "Franz Metz", and had photos taken of someone portraying "Metz" with the director; on opening night, secret police came inquiring after the address of Asturias (who had died earlier that year), and the government started paying attention to the previews of plays in the next year.

The second film adaptation, in 1983, was directed by Manuel Octavio Gómez, and was one of the last films made by this prolific Cuban film director. It starred French actor Michel Auclair as "El Presidente".

The most recent film adaptation, directed by Venezuelan Rómulo Guardia Granier and produced by RCTV (Radio Caracas Televisión Internacional), was released in November 2007 and is the first film produced by RCTV in more than twenty years. This version paints the picture of a hopeless love story—one that is unable to succeed under the terrorizing and corrupt dictatorship. It therefore plays up what is only hinted at in the novel itself, the possibility that the President is driven at least in part by sexual desire.

Perhaps the most striking aspect of this film version is the way in which it was immediately taken as a commentary on the present government of Venezuela. Director Granier divulged in an interview, "We had to film in secret in order to avoid being shut down." Antonio Blanco, who also worked on this adaptation, said that: "We plan to market the film as a Guatemalan story to avoid any problems with authorities." RCTV lost its terrestrial broadcasting rights in mid-2007 when the government of Hugo Chávez (who was democratically elected, but accused by opponents of harboring dictatorial tendencies) did not renew the network's license.

== Publication details ==
The third Spanish edition of El Señor Presidente, revised and corrected by the author, and published by Losada in 1952

A manuscript exists of the first draft of El Señor Presidente, which at that time (July 1933) was entitled Tohil. This is now in the National Library of Paris. "Tohil's Dance" is the title of chapter 37 of the finished work. The main differences between this draft and the published book can be found in chapter 12 ("Camila") and in the fact that the former lacks the latter's epilogue.

The first published version of El Señor Presidente came out in 1946, while Asturias was semi-exiled in Mexico City. The publication was financed by Asturias himself, aided by his parents, as the manuscript had been rejected by the publishers to whom he had sent it. This first edition suffered from numerous typographical errors. These errors were only rectified in the third edition, published in Argentina in 1952, which also included numerous substantial changes introduced by Asturias himself. This edition is, therefore, the first definitive version of the book. As noted by Gerald Martin, editor of the 2000 critical edition, "measured in terms of its decisive historical influence," the third (Losada) edition is "easily the most important of them all".

Selected editions:

- 1946, Mexico, Costa-Amic (ISBN NA), hardback (First edition, original Spanish)
- 1948, Argentina, Losada (ISBN NA), hardback (Second edition, Spanish)
- 1952, Argentina, Losada (ISBN NA), hardback (Third edition, Spanish, corrected by author)
- 1963, UK, Victor Gollancz (ISBN NA), paperback (Eng. trans. by Frances Partridge as The President)
- 1964, US, Atheneum (ISBN NA), paperback (Eng. trans. by Frances Partridge as El Señor Presidente)
- 1972, UK, Penguin (ISBN 978-0-14-003404-2), pub date 30 March 1972, paperback (Eng. trans. as The President)
- 1978, France, Klincksieck, and Mexico, Fondo de Cultura Económica (ISBN NA) (Spanish, first critical edition, ed. by Ricardo Navas Ruiz and Jean-Marie Saint-Lu, part of Asturias's Complete Works)
- 1997, US, Waveland Press (ISBN 978-0-88133-951-2), pub date August 1997, paperback (Eng. trans. as The President)
- 2000, Spain, Galaxia Gutenberg, and France, ALLCA XX (ISBN 84-89666-51-2), hardback (Spanish, critical edition ed. by Gerald Martin)
- 2005, Spain, Alianza (ISBN 978-84-206-5876-6), pub date 2 January 2005, paperback (Spanish
