= H.N.I.C. (Prodigy album) =

Studio album by Prodigy
- Released: November 14, 2000
- Recorded: 1998–2000
- Genres: East Coast hip hop; hardcore hip hop
- Length: 66:20
- Labels: Infamous; Violator; SRC; Loud; Epic
- Producers: Prodigy; Bink!; Hangmen 3; The Alchemist; Robert Kirkland; Mobb Deep; EZ Elpee; Nashiem Myrick; Rockwilder; Just Blaze; Ric Rude

Prodigy chronology
H.N.I.C. (2000)	Return of the Mac (2007)

Professional ratings
Review scores
Source	Rating
AllMusic	3/5 stars
Los Angeles Times	3/4 stars
HipHopDX	4/5 stars
RapReviews	8.0/10
The Rolling Stone Album Guide	4/5 stars
The Source	4/5 stars
Vibe	4/5 stars

H.N.I.C. (an acronym for Head Nigga in Charge) is the debut solo studio album by American rapper Prodigy. Originally scheduled for a summer 2000 release, the album was ultimately released on November 14, 2000 through Prodigy's Infamous Records, Loud Records, SRC Records, Violator and Epic.

After four Mobb Deep albums, Prodigy took a temporary break from the group and released his first solo effort. Prodigy enlisted a number of producers for the album, including The Alchemist, EZ Elpee, Rockwilder, Just Blaze and his Mobb Deep partner Havoc. Music videos were done for "Keep It Thoro" and "Y.B.E" (Young Black Entrepreneurs). The album received widespread critical acclaim. The song "Keep It Thoro" was released on vinyl.

A sequel, H.N.I.C. Pt. 2 was released on April 22, 2008. It features production by Havoc, a fellow member of Mobb Deep and The Alchemist among others. In 2011, after being released from prison, Prodigy began work on the third album in the series, H.N.I.C. 3.

Several rappers took inspiration from H.N.I.C., including Wiz Khalifa for his album O.N.I.F.C. (2012), and then-16-year-old Kendrick Lamar for his debut mixtape Y.H.N.I.C. (2003).

H.N.I.C. was certified Gold by the RIAA on December 18, 2000.

== Background ==
While Prodigy was working on H.N.I.C. and the Murda Muzik album with Mobb Deep, he started living a healthy lifestyle.

"Quiet Storm", a track that appeared on Murda Muzik, was originally intended for H.N.I.C. Prodigy utilized the song as a platform to share his personal struggles with Sickle-cell disease, which affected him throughout his life. In the track "You Can Never Feel My Pain," Prodigy delves into the emotional toll of the disease, revealing that it has led to depression and a desire for controlled substances and alcohol.

The 6th track "Keep It Thoro" does not have a hook or chorus; this was the central idea of the song, with Prodigy making this clear with the penultimate line "heavy airplay all day with no chorus." However, Prodigy's manager at the time, Chris Lighty, thought the song would receive more radio airplay with a chorus. After the album release, Havoc released a version with a chorus, editing the penultimate line out. The Alchemist, the producer of this track, later commented that "the hook was dope too but the song was already powerful enough." This version of the song was included on the Japanese edition of the album as a bonus track.

Prodigy's wife KiKi appears on the track "Trials of Love" as B.K. (aka) Mz. Bars, the only time she appears on a song. She made her video appearance in the Hey Luv video from Mobb Deep's Infamy (2001).

The album appeared on "The 100 Best Albums of the 2000s" list by Complex magazine.

== Track listing ==
No.	Title	Producer(s)	Length
1.	"Bars & Hooks (Intro)"		1:19
2.	"Genesis"	Prodigy	2:49
3.	"Drive Thru (skit)"		0:16
4.	"Rock Dat Shit"	Bink Dogg	4:21
5.	"What U Rep" (featuring Noreaga)	Hang Men 3	4:32
6.	"Keep It Thoro"	The Alchemist	3:05
7.	"Can't Complain" (featuring Twin Gambino & Chinky)	Prodigy	4:19
8.	"Infamous Minded" (featuring Big Noyd)	Robert Kirkland	3:27
9.	"Wanna Be Thugs" (featuring Havoc)	Havoc	2:50
10.	"Three" (featuring Cormega)	The Alchemist	2:20
11.	"Delt with the Bullshit" (featuring Havoc)	Havoc	3:22
12.	"Trials of Love" (featuring B.K. (aka) Mz. Bars)	The Alchemist	3:50
13.	"H.N.I.C."	EZ Elpee	3:03
14.	"Be Cool (skit)"		0:16
15.	"Veteran's Memorial"	The Alchemist	4:56
16.	"Do It" (featuring Mike Delorean)	Rockwilder	3:20
17.	"Littles (skit)"		1:19
18.	"Y.B.E." (featuring B.G. of the Cash Money Millionaires)	Stephen "Lost Spirit" Dorsain; Nashiem Myrick; Prodigy	4:21
19.	"Diamond" (featuring Bars & Hooks)	Just Blaze	4:05
20.	"Gun Play" (featuring Big Noyd)	Rockwilder	4:44
21.	"You Can Never Feel My Pain"	Ric Rude	3:27
22.	"H.N.I.C. (Outro)"		0:18

== Charts ==
Chart (2001)	Peak position
US Billboard 200	18
US Independent Albums (Billboard)	2
US Top R&B/Hip-Hop Albums (Billboard)	6

== Certifications ==
Region	Certification	Certified units/sales
United States (RIAA)	Gold	500,000^{^}
^{^} Shipments figures based on certification alone.
