= El Señor Presidente (2007 film) =

- Film poster
- Directed by: Rómulo Guardia
- Based on: El Señor Presidente
- Produced by: Radio Caracas Televisión
- Release date: 2007
- Country: Venezuela
- Language: Spanish

El Señor Presidente is the most recent film adaptation of the 1946 homonymous novel by Guatemalan writer Miguel Ángel Asturias, directed by Venezuelan Rómulo Guardia and produced by RCTV (Radio Caracas Televisión Internacional), released in November 2007 and is the first film produced by RCTV in more than twenty years.

== Plot ==
This version paints the picture of a hopeless love story—one that is unable to succeed under the terrorizing and corrupt dictatorship. It therefore plays up what is only hinted at in the novel itself, the possibility that the President is driven at least in part by sexual desire.

== Production ==
Perhaps the most striking aspect of this film version is the way in which it was immediately taken as a commentary on the present government of Venezuela. Director Granier divulged in an interview, "We had to film in secret in order to avoid being shut down." Antonio Blanco, who also worked on this adaptation, said that: "We plan to market the film as a Guatemalan story to avoid any problems with authorities." RCTV lost its terrestrial broadcasting rights in mid-2007 when the government of Hugo Chávez (who was democratically elected, but accused by opponents of harboring dictatorial tendencies) did not renew the network's license.
