= Young Rollin Stonerz =

Studio album by Prodigy & Boogz Boogetz
- Released: November 24, 2014
- Recorded: 2013–2014
- Genre: Hip hop
- Length: 39:25
- Label: Infamous Records
- Producers: Drew Skillz, J.C. Syn, King Tut, KC da Beatmonster, League of Starz, Outkast 2 da Game, Zam

Prodigy chronology
Albert Einstein (2013)	Young Rollin Stonerz (2014)	Hegelian Dialectic (The Book of Revelation) (2017)

Boogz Boogetz chronology
Young Rollin Stonerz (2014)

Young Rollin Stonerz is the collaborative studio album by American rappers Prodigy and Boogz Boogetz. The album was released on November 24, 2014, by Infamous Records.

== Background ==
In a November 2014, interview with Nah Right, Prodigy spoke about the album, saying: "I did a deal with Boogz so he could promote his label and we decided to name the album to help push his brand. It’s just fun. When you listen to it it’s just fun music. It’s hardcore hip-hop but at the same time the energy that Boogz brings to it just enables me to create a lighter side of my writing aside from doing real dark hip-hop. [I’m] still sticking to my guns and being myself. I’m going to always be myself but it’s just like making songs with Boogz–his personality alone, outside of the music, he’s just a fun person. He likes to joke around a lot, do pranks on motherfuckers so it comes out when he writes. You can tell, his music is just fun. He make that smoker music. Boogz comes from that skater world. He reminds me of my son. My son’s a skater, my son has the same sort of fun personality. That new foundation is just like they ain’t really about beefin’ and drama in hip-hop. They’re just about having fun and making money and doing what they do."

== Critical reception ==
Professional ratings
Review scores
Source	Rating
HipHopDX	3.5/5 stars

Homer Johnsen of HipHopDX gave the album three and a half stars out of five, saying "For Prodigy, Young Rollin Stonerz is more of an Indie effort, in that there are no famous guests or producers. The production also stands out for its indifference to the Boom Bap sound that molded him into what he is today. As for Boogz, it works amazingly well. And, as far as his career of projects go, this is a watershed moment for the young rapper. But at eleven songs, the better moments of the album aren’t duplicated enough for either artist. The two work well together, though, and it would in both of their interests to keep working together in to the future."

== Track listing ==
No.	Title	Producer(s)	Length
1.	"Queens"	Drew Skillz	2:56
2.	"Next Level"	Drew Skillz	5:42
3.	"Money & Power"	Outkast 2 da Game	3:12
4.	"Pass Me"	Drew Skillz	2:20
5.	"40 Oz"	Drew Skillz	3:29
6.	"P.I.M.P."	Zam	2:45
7.	"Scarface"	J.C. Syn	3:15
8.	"Clouds"	League of Starz	4:47
9.	"Young Rollin Stonerz"	King Tut	2:59
10.	"Ain't Real" (featuring KC da Beatmonster)	KC da Beatmonster	4:26
11.	"Motion Picture"	J.C. Syn	3:33
