= Mrs. President =

Mrs. President may refer to:

- Mr. President (title) or Mrs. President
- A title historically used to refer to the First Lady of the United States
  - Abigail Adams, second First Lady of the United States, sometimes referred to as "Mrs. President"
- Mrs. President (opera), an opera about Victoria Woodhull composed by Victoria Bond

== See also ==
- Mr. President (disambiguation)
