= Arinzechukwu =

- Gender: Male
- Language: Igbo

Origin
- Origin: Nigeria
- Meaning: Thanks to God
- Region of origin: Igboland

Other names
- Variant form: Kenechukwu
- Short form: Arinze
- See also: Kenechukwu

Arinzechukwu audio is an Igbo name. The name means "thanks to God".

== Notable people with the name ==
- Noah Arinzechukwu Okafor, Swiss footballer
- Charles Arizechukwu Igwe, Nigerian professor of soil sciences
- Jonathan Arinzechukwu Onyemelukwe, Anglican Bishop of Nigeria
