= Return of the Mac =

Studio album by Prodigy
- Released: March 27, 2007
- Recorded: 2006–07
- Genre: Hip-hop
- Length: 39:21
- Labels: Infamous; Koch
- Producers: Alchemist; DJ Muro

Prodigy chronology
H.N.I.C. (2000)	Return of the Mac (2007)	H.N.I.C. Pt. 2 (2008)

Singles from Return of the Mac
- 1. "Mac 10 Handle" Released: 2006; 2. "Return of the Mac" Released: 2007; 3. "Stuck on You" Released: 2007

Return of the Mac is the second solo studio album by American rapper Prodigy. It was released on March 27, 2007, through Prodigy's Infamous Records and Koch Records. Production was handled entirely by The Alchemist, who produced the project utilizing song samples from the Blaxploitation era, with DJ Muro, who produced two tracks. It features guest appearances from Majesty and Un Pacino.

The album debuted at number thirty-two on the Billboard 200, selling 27,000 copies in its first week. As of December 2007, the album had sold 130,000 copies. The album spawned three singles—"Mac 10 Handle", "Return of the Mac" and "Stuck on You", with accompanying music videos directed by DanTheMan.

== Background ==
Soon after the release of the Mobb Deep's seventh studio album Blood Money, Prodigy parted ways with G-Unit Records and began working on a H.N.I.C. sequel. Record producer and circa Murda Muzik days collaborator the Alchemist, who pictured on the album cover alongside Prodigy, took on the project, which was intended to be a prequel mixtape to upcoming H.N.I.C. Pt. 2. Due to the unexpected level of quality of the resulting record, it was decided to release the effort as a traditional studio album.

Six years after the release of Return of the Mac, Prodigy and the Alchemist released a full-length collaborative album, Albert Einstein.

== Critical reception ==
Professional ratings
Aggregate scores
Source	Rating
Metacritic	75/100
Review scores
Source	Rating
AllMusic	4/5 stars
Cokemachineglow	67%/100%
HipHopDX	3/5
Pitchfork	8.5/10
PopMatters	5/10
RapReviews	8/10
Spin	3.5/5 stars
XXL	3/5 (L)

Return of the Mac was met with generally favourable reviews from music critics. At Metacritic, which assigns a normalized rating out of 100 to reviews from mainstream publications, the album received an average score of 75, based on eleven reviews.

Tom Breihan of Pitchfork wrote: "what it is is the announcement of a stunning and unexpected late-career renaissance; Prodigy is tapping back into the fearsome frustration that once drove him". AllMusic's David Jeffries resumed: "even if this is familiar ground, an album so tight in theme and feel is refreshing in an era where most lyricists invite anybody and everybody". Steve 'Flash' Juon of RapReviews stated that the album "is everything that Blood Money should have been and wasn't". Mark Abraham of Cokemachineglow was "happy to hear Prodigy sounding engaged and excited again, even if the quality of his lyricism doesn't match his newfound enthusiasm". In his mixed review for PopMatters, Quentin B Huff found the album "presents a more refined and progressive Prodigy than the one we heard on Blood Money, but there's no indication that Hell on Earth's Prodigy will be heard from anytime soon".

== Track listing ==
No.	Title	Writer(s)	Producer(s)	Length
1.	"The Mac Is Back" (Intro)	Johnson; Maman	Alchemist	1:54
2.	"Return of the Mac" (Aka New York Shit)	Johnson; Maman	Alchemist	2:59
3.	"Stuck on You"	Johnson; Maman	Alchemist	4:29
4.	"Mac 10 Handle"	Johnson; Maman	Alchemist	4:15
5.	"Down & Out in New York City"	Bodie Chandler; Barry De Vorzon	Alchemist	0:33
6.	"The Rotten Apple"	Johnson; Maman	Alchemist	3:06
7.	"Madge Speaks" (featuring Majesty)		Alchemist	1:17
8.	"Take It to the Top"	Johnson; Maman	Alchemist; DJ Muro	3:23
9.	"P. Speaks"		Alchemist	1:06
10.	"7th Heaven" (featuring Un Pacino)	Johnson; Jamal Brayboy-Brady; Maman	Alchemist	2:45
11.	"Bang on 'Em"	Johnson; Maman	Alchemist	3:40
12.	"Nickel and a Nail"	Johnson; Maman	Alchemist	2:57
13.	"Legends"	Johnson; Maman	Alchemist	3:58
14.	"Stop Fronting"	Johnson; Maman	Alchemist	3:07
Total length:				39:27

Best Buy bonus tracks
No.	Title	Producer(s)	Length
15.	"My Priorities"	Alchemist	3:24
16.	"That's That" (featuring Havoc and Alchemist)	Alchemist	4:01
17.	"Last Words" (featuring Kokane)	Alchemist	2:41
Total length:			49:27

Sample credits

- Track 2 contains samples of "Kamen Rider" performed by Shunsuke Kikuchi.
- Track 1 contains samples of "Blacula Strikes" performed by Gene Page.
- Track 4 contains samples of "Easin In" performed by Edwin Starr.
- Tracks 5 and 6 contain samples of "Down and Out in New York City" performed by James Brown.
- Track 11 contains samples of "Do I Stand A Chance" performed by The Montclairs.
- Track 14 contains samples of "Playing Your Game Baby" performed by Barry White.

== Personnel ==
- Albert "Prodigy" Johnson – vocals, executive producer
- Madgesty – vocals (track 7)
- Jamal "Un Pacino" Brayboy-Brady – vocals (track 10)
- Alan "The Alchemist" Maman – producer, executive producer
- Murota "DJ Muro" Takayoshi – producer (tracks: 1, 8)
- Eddie Sancho – mixing (tracks: 1, 2, 4, 6–14, 16, 17)
- Kevin Crouse – mixing (tracks: 3, 15)
- Arnold Mischkulnig – mixing (track 5), mastering
- Andrew Kelley – art direction, design, photography
- Rayon Richards – photography
- Ted D'Ottavio – photography
- Paul Grosso – creative director
- Alyson Abbagnaro – A&R
- Bob Perry – A&R

== Charts ==
Chart (2007)	Peak position
US Billboard 200	32
US Top R&B/Hip-Hop Albums (Billboard)	9
US Top Rap Albums (Billboard)	5
US Independent Albums (Billboard)	2
