= Jack Himelblau =

Author and professor

Jack J. Himelblau is an author and a professor of Spanish literature at The University of Texas at San Antonio. He received his doctorate in 1965 from the University of Michigan with a thesis on "The aesthetic ideas of Alejandro O. Deustua".

== Works ==
Himelblau served on the advisory board for The Paisano, the independent student newspaper of UTSA.
