= The Ellsworth Bumpy Johnson EP =

EP by Prodigy
- Released: April 19, 2011
- Recorded: 2011
- Genre: East Coast hip-hop
- Length: 35:18
- Producer: Sid Roams, The Alchemist, King Benny

Prodigy chronology
Product of the 80's (2008)	The Ellsworth Bumpy Johnson EP (2011)	H.N.I.C. 3: The Mixtape (2012)

The Ellsworth Bumpy Johnson EP is an EP by rapper Prodigy of Mobb Deep. It was released on April 19, 2011. The EP is available for free download on the internet. The EP were serves as the prelude to The Bumpy Johnson Album which was released in 2012.

== Track listing ==
No.	Title	Producer(s)	Length
1.	"The One and Only"	The Alchemist	4:52
2.	"Go Off"	Sid Roams	5:47
3.	"Black Devil"	Sid Roams	4:13
4.	"Twilight" (featuring Havoc)	Sid Roams	5:11
5.	"For One Night Only"	The Alchemist	5:29
6.	"Stronger"	King Benny	4:49

Bonus Track
No.	Title	Producer(s)	Length
7.	"Told Ya’ll"	Sid Roams	5:01
