= Dear Mr. President =

Dear Mr. President may refer to:

- Dear Mr. President (album), 1942 album by the Almanac Singers
- "Dear Mr. President" (4 Non Blondes song), 1992
- "Dear Mr. President" (Fitz and the Tantrums song), 2010
- "Dear Mr. President" (Fredwreck song), 2004
- "Dear Mr. President" (Pink song), 2006
