= Albert Einstein (album) =

Studio album by Prodigy and the Alchemist
- Released: June 11, 2013
- Recorded: 2012–2013
- Genre: Hip-hop
- Length: 47:45
- Label: Infamous
- Producers: The Alchemist; Adrian Younge (co.)

Prodigy and the Alchemist chronology
Return of the Mac (2007)	Albert Einstein (2013)

Prodigy chronology
The Bumpy Johnson Album (2012)	Albert Einstein (2013)	Hegelian Dialectic (The Book of Revelation) (2017)

The Alchemist chronology
Russian Roulette (2012)	Albert Einstein (2013)	The Silent Partner (2016)

Singles from Albert Einstein
- 1. "Give ‘Em Hell" Released: January 28, 2013; 2. "Dough Pildin'" Released: May 12, 2013; 3. "Y.N.T." Released: June 4, 2013; 4. "IMDKV" Released: February 3, 2014

Albert Einstein is the only collaborative studio album by American hip-hop recording artist Prodigy of Mobb Deep and American record producer the Alchemist. The album was released on June 11, 2013, by Infamous Records. The album features guest appearances from Roc Marciano, Domo Genesis, Havoc, Raekwon and Action Bronson.

== Background ==
On November 27, 2012 Prodigy announced an upcoming collaboration album with producer The Alchemist via his Twitter account, along with the title of Albert Einstein. He also would say the album was scheduled for an early 2013 release. It would be their second collaboration album after 2007's Return of the Mac. In November 2012, when speaking about the album with Complex Prodigy described it as a concept album.

On April 7, 2013 The Alchemist revealed via Twitter that the album had been completed. Then on April 12, 2013, the album's official track listing was revealed. The album contains 16 tracks and features guest appearances by Roc Marciano, Domo Genesis, Havoc, Raekwon, and Action Bronson.

== Release and promotion ==
The first single, "Give ‘Em Hell" was released on January 28, 2013 via Prodigy's SoundCloud page. The song features vocals by Prodigy and was produced by The Alchemist. The album was originally scheduled to be released on May 14, 2013, but Amazon.com would later reveal a release date for the album of June 11, 2013. The second song released in promotion of the album would be "Dough Pildin'" on May 12, 2013. On June 4, 2013, the music video was released for "Y.N.T." featuring Domo Genesis. The music video for "Dough Pildin'" was released on June 17, 2013. On June 25, 2013, the music video was released for "Give ‘Em Hell". On February 3, 2014, the music video was released for "IMDKV".

== Critical response ==
Professional ratings
Aggregate scores
Source	Rating
Metacritic	73/100
Review scores
Source	Rating
AllHipHop	8/10
AllMusic	3/5 stars
Exclaim!	6/10
HipHopDX	3.5/5 stars
Pitchfork	8.2/10
PopMatters	7/10
RapReviews	8.5/10
XXL	(L)

Albert Einstein was met with generally positive reviews from music critics. At Metacritic, which assigns a normalized rating out of 100 to reviews from mainstream critics, the album received an average score of 73, based on 7 reviews, indicating "generally favorable reviews". Reed Jackson of XXL gave the album an L, saying "It’s the type of rough and witty realism people loved from P in the ’90s, and hopefully it’s here to stay for projects to come." Logan Smithson of PopMatters gave the album a seven out of ten, saying "Albert Einstein has plenty of memorable beats, but the lyrics don’t match that same level of success. You might not be blown away by the album, but Prodigy and Alchemist have put together a highly enjoyable album." Jaroslav Lavick of RapReviews gave the album an 8.5 out of ten, saying "This album is Prodigy and Alchemist giving long time fans exactly what they want."

Peter Marrack of Exclaim! gave the album a six out of ten, saying "He's casual, not always sincere, but dangerously convincing; his bars haven't faltered since his early Mobb Deep days and Einstein is no exception." Nate Patrin of Pitchfork gave the album an 8.2 out of 10, saying "Albert Einstein is so casually visceral and immediately gettable that it feels like a recent high point for both of them." Jesse Fairfax of HipHopDX gave the album three and a half stars out of five, saying "Sharing his first name with the famed genius, Prodigy breaks his advanced expertise down to a science on Albert Einstein. Prodigy continues his largely consistent reign as a still thriving pioneer of New York’s once thugged-out era." Matthew Sanderson of AllHipHop gave the album an eight out of ten, saying "This album is for the fans of the original Mobb sound of the late 90s. For the most part sick signature Alchemist beats, with the addition of some new sounds that are just right."

== Commercial performance ==
The album debuted at number 175 on the Billboard 200 chart, with first-week sales of 3,000 copies in the United States.

== Track listing ==
- All songs solely produced by The Alchemist except track 13, co-produced by Adrian Younge.

No.	Title	Length
1.	"Intro"	0:25
2.	"IMDKV"	2:35
3.	"Give ‘Em Hell"	2:56
4.	"Stay Dope"	3:18
5.	"Curb Ya Dog"	3:13
6.	"Death Sentence" (featuring Roc Marciano)	3:14
7.	"Bear Meat"	2:52
8.	"Y.N.T." (featuring Domo Genesis)	2:36
9.	"R.I.P." (featuring Havoc & Raekwon)	3:22
10.	"Dough Pildin'"	2:26
11.	"Confessions"	3:37
12.	"Bible Paper"	3:44
13.	"The One" (featuring Action Bronson)	3:35
14.	"Breeze"	3:02
15.	"Raw Forever"	4:27
16.	"Say My Name"	2:22

P=MC² Deluxe Edition
No.	Title	Length
17.	"Mightier Pen"	2:39
18.	"Murder Goes Down"	2:09
19.	"Infamous Allegiance"	3:22
20.	"Gnarly"	3:16

== Personnel ==
Credits for Albert Einstein adapted from AllMusic.

- Action Bronson – Featured Artist
- Alan Daniel 'The Alchemist' Maman – Featured Artist, Primary Artist, Engineer, Executive Producer, Producer
- Mark B. Christensen – Mastering
- Domo Genesis – Featured Artist
- Havoc – Featured Artist
- Albert "Prodigy" Johnson – Primary Artist, Executive Producer
- Roc Marciano – Featured Artist
- Raekwon – Featured Artist
- Dom Rinaldi – Cover Art
- Eddie Sancho – Mixing
- Joe "Average Joe" Patrello – Engineer
- BaJa Ukweli – Layout Design
- Adrian Younge – Producer
- Nacor Zuluaga – Assistant
