= Product of the 80's =

Studio album by Prodigy, Big Twins & Un Pacino
- Released: October 21, 2008
- Recorded: 2008
- Studio: Dirt Class East (Brooklyn, NY)
- Genre: Gangsta rap
- Length: 56:54
- Label: Dirt Class; Infamous
- Producer: Benny Needles; DJ Sebb; Jake One; Sid Roams

Prodigy chronology
H.N.I.C. Pt. 2 (2005)	Product of the 80's (2008)	H.N.I.C. 3 (2012)

Singles from Product of the 80's
- 1. "Stop Stressin'" Released: August 2008; 2. "In the Smash" Released: September 2008; 3. "Shed Thy Blood" Released: October 2008

Professional ratings
Review scores
Source	Rating
HipHopDX	3/5
RapReviews	8/10

Product of the 80's is an album by American rapper Prodigy of Mobb Deep featuring fellow rappers Big Twins of Infamous Mobb and Un Pacino of Hard White. It was released on October 21, 2008 via Dirt Class Records and Prodigy's Infamous Records. Recording sessions took place at Dirt Class East in Brooklyn. Production was handled by Sid Roams, Jake One, DJ Sebb, and Benny Needles, who also served as executive producer. It features guest appearances from Chinky and Hard White.

== Track listing ==
No.	Title	Writer(s)	Producer(s)	Length
1.	"Intro"			0:35
2.	"Waddup G'z"	Albert Johnson; Joey Chavez; Tavish Graham	Sid Roams	3:18
3.	"Shed Thy Blood"	Johnson; Jamal Brayboy-Brady; Jacob Dutton	Jake One	2:44
4.	"Box Cutters"	Johnson; Jamal Abdulraheem; Chavez; Graham	Sid Roams	3:29
5.	"Catch Body Music"	Johnson; Chavez; Graham	Sid Roams	3:37
6.	"P Keep Spittin'"	Johnson; Chavez; Graham	Sid Roams	2:44
7.	"Test Tube Babies"	Johnson; Chavez; Graham	Sid Roams	4:02
8.	"Cold World"	Johnson; Chavez; Graham	Sid Roams	2:40
9.	"Anytime"	Johnson; Brayboy-Brady; Chavez; Graham	Sid Roams	3:05
10.	"Stop Stressin'"	Johnson; Chavez; Graham	Sid Roams; Benny Needles	3:24
11.	"Damn Daddy"	Johnson; Brayboy-Brady; Abdulraheem; Dutton	Jake One	3:28
12.	"Sex, Drugs & Murder"	Johnson; Abdulraheem; Brayboy-Brady; Chavez; Graham	Sid Roams	4:43
13.	"In the Smash"	Johnson; Abdulraheem; Chavez; Graham	Sid Roams	3:34
14.	"Circle Don't Stop" (featuring Chinky)	Johnson; Abdulraheem; Chavez; Graham	Sid Roams	3:19
15.	"Am I Crazy?/They Want Me Dead (featuring Hard White) (Hidden Bonus Track)"	Johnson; Sébastien Vuignier	DJ Sebb	9:37

Digital bonus track
No.	Title	Length
17.	"Lay'd Out" (featuring Big Twins & Un Pacino)	2:50

== Personnel ==
- Albert "Prodigy" Johnson – vocals
- Jamal "Big Twins"/"Twin Gambino" Abdul Raheem – vocals (tracks: 4, 11–14)
- Jamal "Un Pacino" Brayboy-Brady – vocals (tracks: 3, 9, 11, 12)
- Shalene "Chinky" Evans – vocals (track 14)
- Cody Lee – additional instruments (track 7)
- Nick Brongers – additional instruments (track 7)
- Joey Chavez – producer (tracks: 2, 4–10, 12–14), recording, mixing, project coordinator
- Tavish "Bravo" Graham – producer (tracks: 2, 4–10, 12–14), recording, mixing, project coordinator
- Jacob "Jake One" Dutton – producer (tracks: 3, 11)
- Benny Needles – producer (track 10), executive producer
- Sébastien "DJ Sebb" Vuignier – producer (track 15)
- Victor Padilla – mixing
- Kevin Blackler – mastering
- Navarro Ristagno – artwork, design, layout
- Armen Djerrahian – photography
- Matt Welch – project coordinator
