= The Hegelian Dialectic 2: The Book of Heroine =

Studio album by Prodigy
- Released: September 30, 2022
- Genre: Hip-hop
- Length: 35:13
- Label: Infamous
- Producers: ASAP P on the Boards; Bando Red; Berto Rich; Billy Lines; DJ Premier; DJ Scratch; Joe the Engine Ear; Knxwledge; TrickyTrippz

Prodigy chronology
Hegelian Dialectic (The Book of Revelation) (2017)	The Hegelian Dialectic 2: The Book of Heroine (2022)	The Hegelian Dialectic 3: The Book of the Dead (TBA)

Singles from The Hegelian Dialectic 2: The Book of Heroine
- 1. "You Will See" Released: June 10, 2022; 2. "Walk Out" Released: September 9, 2022

The Hegelian Dialectic 2: The Book of Heroine is the seventh studio album by American rapper Prodigy. It was posthumously released by Infamous Records on September 30, 2022. It features guest appearances by Berto Rich, Big Daddy Kane, Big Noyd, Chinky, DJ Premier, DJ Scratch, Faith Evans, and Remy Ma. Production was handled by a variety of producers, including DJ Premier, DJ Scratch, and Knxwledge. It was preceded by two singles, "You Will See" and "Walk Out".

== Background ==
The album follows five years after Hegelian Dialectic (The Book of Revelation), the last album to be released during Prodigy's lifetime, and serves as the second installment of his Hegelian Dialectic trilogy. It is one of the projects Prodigy had been working on prior to his death, and was originally planned to be released a few months after The Book of Revelation. The album's release was announced on May 20, 2022; the same day Prodigy's discography returned to streaming services after having been unavailable for three years.

The third installment, The Book of the Dead, is planned to be released as the final installment in the trilogy.

== Critical reception ==
Professional ratings
Review scores
Source	Rating
RapReviews	7/10

Ricardo Hazell of HipHopDX gave the album a positive review, writing, "Some Prodigy fans may not vibe with this album, because it's far different than his previous work. But even so, it's a revealing glimpse into the man behind the persona." Grant Jones of RapReviews wrote, "Few rappers can veer from ultra-violence to hard-hitting one-liners and outright emotional sincerity with such effortless charisma – Prodigy shows he remains a master of the craft and this album only makes me miss his voice even more."

== Track listing ==
The Hegelian Dialectic 2: The Book of Heroine track listing
No.	Title	Producer(s)	Length
1.	"You Will See" (featuring Berto Rich)	Berto Rich	2:51
2.	"Walk Out" (featuring DJ Premier)	DJ Premier	2:41
3.	"Opium Poppy"	TrickyTrippz	3:41
4.	"Angel" (featuring Faith Evans)	Knxwledge	2:52
5.	"We Shine" (featuring Berto Rich)	Berto Rich	3:19
6.	"Dope"	TrickyTrippz	3:06
7.	"You Don't Want It" (featuring Big Daddy Kane and DJ Scratch)	DJ Scratch	2:57
8.	"I Heart You"	Berto Rich	2:53
9.	"Overdose" (featuring Remy Ma)	Berto Rich	3:23
10.	"Escapism"	ASAP P on the Boards	2:45
11.	"Flirting with Death" (featuring Chinky and Big Noyd)	Joe the Engine Ear; Billy Lines	2:33
12.	"The Other Side"	Bando Red	2:10
Total length:			35:13
