= Arinze Stanley Egbengwu =

Nigerian artist and activist

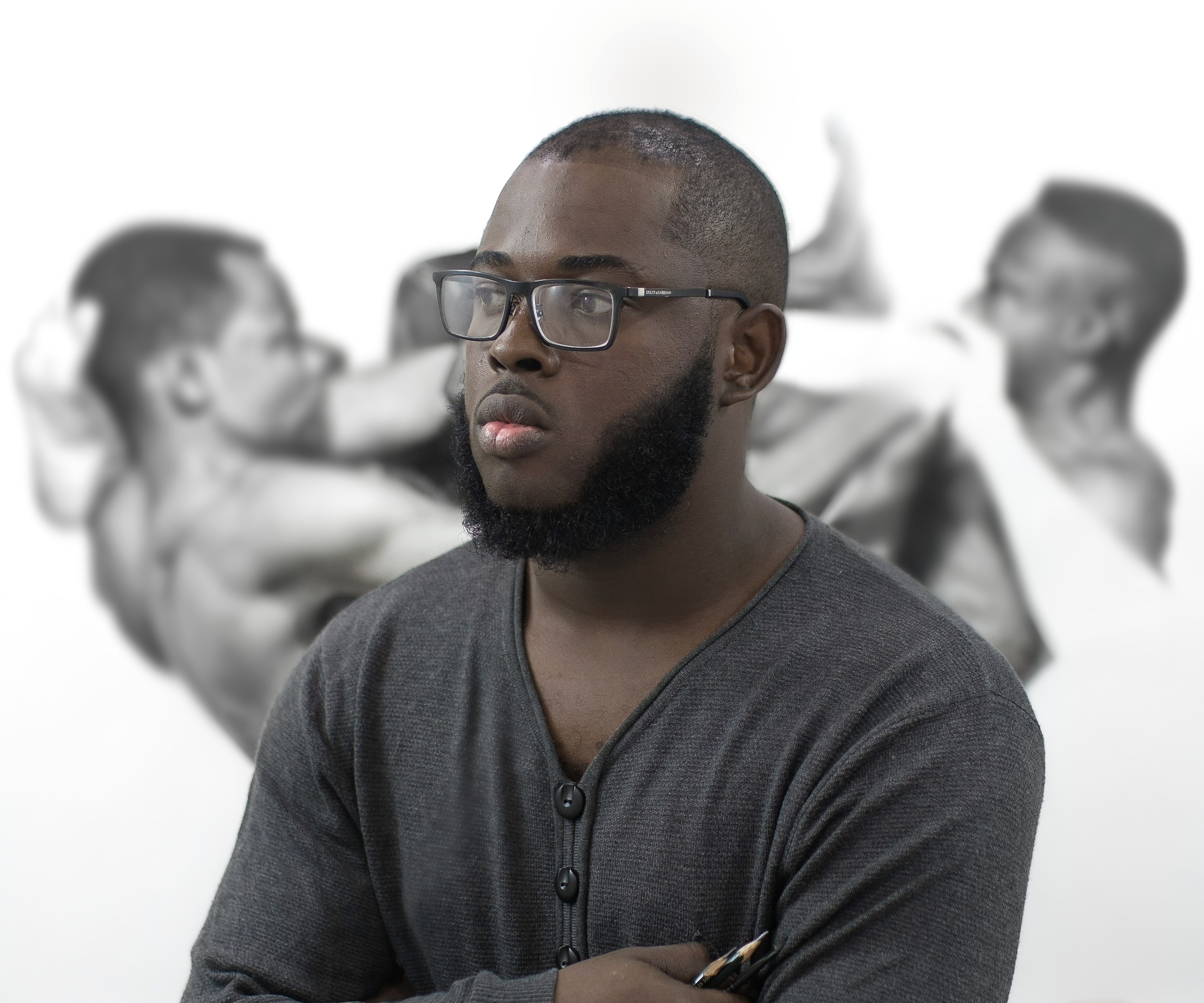
- Known for: Drawing
- Movement: Hyperrealism
- Website: www.arinzestanley.com

Arinze Stanley Egbengwu (born 1993) is a Nigerian artist, activist, photographer, engineer, and entrepreneur. He is best known for creating hyper realistic pencil drawings.

Working primarily with charcoal and graphite on paper, Egbengwu uses his works as a medium for social and political activism. His work addresses matters including racism, modern slavery, and feminism both in his community and worldwide.

== Early life ==
Egbengwu was born on 20 November 1993. He is a self-taught artist and lives in Lagos, Nigeria.

In 2014, Arinze graduated from Imo State University with a Bachelor's of Engineering in agricultural engineering.

== See also ==
- Kareem Olamilekan

== Sources ==
- "Wildly Talented Nigerian Artist Made This Drawing Without Any Training Whatsoever | The Huffington Post". huffingtonpost.com. 28 March 2017.
- "This Artist's Life-Sized Portraits Made With Charcoal & Graphite Are Incredible | BLAVITY". blavity.com.
- Hyperrealistic portraits, thisiscolossal.com. Accessed 26 March 2024.
