= H.N.I.C. Pt. 2 =

Studio album by Prodigy
- Released: April 22, 2008
- Recorded: 2004-2007
- Genre: Hip-hop
- Labels: Infamous; AAO; Voxonic
- Producers: Alchemist; Apex; Havoc; Sid Roams

Prodigy chronology
Return of the Mac (2007)	H.N.I.C. Pt. 2 (2008)	Product of the 80's (2008)

Singles from H.N.I.C. Pt. 2
- 1. "The Life" Released: April 8, 2008

H.N.I.C. Pt. 2 is the third solo studio album by American rapper Prodigy. It was released on April 22, 2008, via Infamous Records, AAO, and Voxonic. Production was handled by the Alchemist, Sid Roams, Apex and Havoc. It features guest appearances from Big Twins, Un Pacino, Big Noyd, and Havoc. In the United States, the album peaked at number 36 on the Billboard 200, number 3 on the Top R&B/Hip-Hop Albums, number 2 on the Top Rap Albums and number 4 on the Independent Albums charts. The album serves as a sequel to his 2000 album H.N.I.C. and a prequel to 2012's H.N.I.C. 3.

== Critical reception ==
Professional ratings
Aggregate scores
Source	Rating
Metacritic	75/100
Review scores
Source	Rating
AllHipHop	6.5/10 stars
AllMusic	3.5/5 stars
HipHopDX	3/5
Pitchfork	7.8/10
PopMatters	8/10
RapReviews	8/10
Spin	4/5 stars
The Phoenix	2.5/4 stars

H.N.I.C. Pt. 2 was met with generally favourable reviews from music critics. At Metacritic, which assigns a normalized rating out of 100 to reviews from mainstream publications, the album received an average score of 75 based on eight reviews.

Anthony Henriques of PopMatters praised the album, stating: "with consistently good production and one of the most distinctive rapping personalities around just letting his mind run wild, H.N.I.C, Pt. 2 is easily one of the best hip-hop albums of 2008 so far". Jesal Padania of RapReviews resumed: "the fans that know and love P or Havoc will immediately identify with H.N.I.C. Pt. 2 and will enjoy listening to it, for sure". Thomas Golianopoulos of Spin called it "a real downer, but it's also completely gripping". Tom Breihan of Pitchfork found that the album "makes for a much more complete and visceral portrait of an incarcerated man than the most precise and technically sound record could possibly manage". AllMusic's David Jeffries concluded: "hardcore fans will be down with every cold hard minute, everybody else gets a B+ effort, and the hip-hop game as a whole gets a really good reason to save Prodigy's place at the table for the next three-and-a-half years". Martín Caballero of The Boston Phoenix wrote: "unless he goes all Malcolm X on us behind the walls, this solid release will be just a prelude to whatever morbid thoughts Prodigy has to share upon his release".

== Track listing ==
No.	Title	Producer(s)	Length
1.	"Real Power Is People"	Sid Roams	3:37
2.	"The Life"	Alchemist	2:47
3.	"Young Veterans"	Alchemist	5:34
4.	"Illuminati"	Alchemist	3:29
5.	"New Yitty"	Sid Roams	2:38
6.	"ABC"	Sid Roams	3:40
7.	"Click Clack" (featuring Big Twins)	Sid Roams	2:55
8.	"Veterans Memorial Pt. 2"	Alchemist	4:29
9.	"Field Marshal P" (featuring Un Pacino)	Havoc	4:26
10.	"3 Stacks" (featuring Big Twins)	Sid Roams	4:00
11.	"When I See You"	Apex	3:11
12.	"It's Nothing" (featuring Big Noyd)	Apex	3:51
13.	"I Want Out" (featuring Havoc and Un Pacino)	Havoc	5:11
14.	"ABC's (Vox Spanish Remix Teaser)" (Bonus Track)	Steve Sola	2:21
15.	"Get Trapped (Circuit City Bonus Track)" (featuring Nyce and Un Pacino)	Havoc	4:20
16.	"When I See You (Remix)" (featuring Cormega)	Apex	4:06
17.	"The Dough"	Alchemist	3:11
18.	"Represent Me" (Circuit City Bonus Track)	Alchemist	3:31
19.	"Sleep When I'm Dead" (Circuit City Bonus Track)	Sid Roams	3:25
20.	"Dirty New Yorker" (Bonus Video)		4:06

Sample credits

- Track 8 contains a sample of "Just a Matter of Time" by Betty Everett.

== Personnel ==
- Albert "Prodigy" Johnson – vocals
- Jamal "Big Twins"/"Twin Gambino" Abdul Raheem – vocals
- Jamal "Un Pacino" Brayboy-Brady – vocals
- TaJuan "Big Noyd" Perry – vocals
- Kejuan "Havoc" Muchita – vocals, producer
- Joey Chavez – producer, recording
- Tavish "Bravo" Graham – producer, recording
- Daniel Alan "The Alchemist" Maman – producer, executive producer
- William Curtis "Apex" Stanberry – producer
- Neil Maman – recording
- Steve Sola – recording, mixing, executive producer
- Chris Gilbert – recording
- Arie Deutsch – re-mixing
- Eduardo "Creon" Norosis – engineering assistant
- Tom Coyne – mastering

== Charts ==
Chart (2008)	Peak position
US Billboard 200	36
US Top R&B/Hip-Hop Albums (Billboard)	3
US Top Rap Albums (Billboard)	2
US Independent Albums (Billboard)	4
