= Prodigy (rapper) =

American rapper (1974–2017)

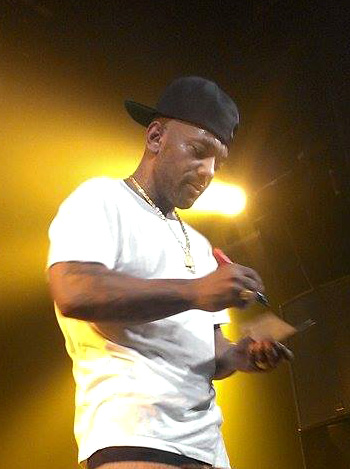
- Prodigy in 2014
- Born: Albert Johnson; November 2, 1974; Hempstead, New York, U.S.
- Died: June 20, 2017 (aged 42); Las Vegas, Nevada, U.S.
- Occupations: Rapper; songwriter; record producer; record executive
- Years active: 1991–2017
- Spouse: Kiki Johnson (m. 2007)
- Children: 2
- Relatives: Budd Johnson; Keg Johnson; William J. White
- Musical career
- Origin: Queens, New York City, U.S.
- Genre: East Coast hip-hop
- Instrument: Vocals
- Labels: Infamous; Loud; SRC; Violator; G-Unit; Sony; RED; E1
- Formerly of: Mobb Deep

Albert Johnson (November 2, 1974 – June 20, 2017), known professionally as Prodigy, was an American rapper and record producer. He was best known for being one half of the rap duo Mobb Deep along with Havoc, yet Prodigy still had a solo career, regularly collaborating with producer The Alchemist. Prodigy released eight albums during his career in Mobb Deep, as well as six solo studio albums and one posthumous album.

== Early life ==
Albert Johnson was born on November 2, 1974, in Hempstead, New York, on Long Island. At age 10 in 1985, Johnson and his mother moved to LeFrak City, Queens.

He had one brother, Greg Johnson. He came from a musical family. His grandfather Budd Johnson was a saxophonist who was inducted into the Big Band and Jazz Hall of Fame in 1993. His grand-uncle, Keg Johnson, was a trombonist. Both of them are remembered for their contributions to the bebop era of jazz. His mother, Fatima Frances (Collins) Johnson, was a member of The Crystals. His father, Budd Johnson Jr., was a member of a doo-wop music group called The Chanters. His great-great-great-grandfather, William Jefferson White, founded Georgia's Morehouse College.

While attending the High School of Art and Design in Manhattan, he met his future music partner, Havoc. The duo became Poetical Prophets. Under the alias Lord-T (The Golden Chyld), the then-15-year-old Johnson landed an uncredited guest appearance on the song "Too Young" by Hi-Five on their eponymous debut album, released in 1990. The song was featured one year later on 1991’s Boyz n the Hood soundtrack. Shortly afterwards, Poetical Prophets received attention through The Source's Unsigned Hype column. In the fall of 1992, the duo released their debut single Peer Pressure after changing their name to Mobb Deep through 4th & B'way, Island and PolyGram Records. In the following spring of 1993, Mobb Deep released their debut album Juvenile Hell.

== Music career ==
=== 1995–1999: Mobb Deep and later solo career ===
Initially known to have gained relevance through fellow Queens rapper Nas, who took a similar approach lyrically on his debut album, Illmatic (1994), Mobb Deep released The Infamous in April 1995, which was certified Gold by the RIAA within the first two months of its release. That same year, Prodigy began to raise his solo profile, by providing a guest appearance on LL Cool J's controversial "I Shot Ya" remix. The song became a minor part of the East Coast–West Coast hip hop rivalry, due to Tupac Shakur believing the song to be a diss referring to his robbery/shooting in Manhattan at Quad Recording Studios – singling out the song's title (which many assumed was connected to Biggie's "Who Shot Ya?"), certain lyrics, and the timing of its release – the year after the shooting incident.

Although the track was stated by Keith Murray to not have any lyrical shots aimed at Tupac, Mobb Deep responded in the following year to Tupac's "Hit 'Em Up" with "Drop a Gem on 'Em," a promotional single from their 1996 album, Hell On Earth. Ironically, "I Shot Ya" does feature a subliminal aim in Prodigy's verse to Murray, which continued friction that started sometime prior with an interlude from Mobb Deep's 1995 The Infamous album. The rivalry continued until sometime in 2012, when the two ended it by taking a picture together.

A year and a half later, at the end of 1996, Prodigy and Havoc released Hell on Earth, which debuted at number six on SoundScan. Their next release, Murda Muzik, was heavily bootlegged while still in its demo stage, leaking, onto the streets and over the internet, rough versions of the nearly 30 songs the duo had recorded.

=== 2000–2006: H.N.I.C. ===
In November 2000, Prodigy released his debut solo album, H.N.I.C. It included the single, "Keep It Thoro".

During the next six years, between the releases of his first two solo albums, Prodigy continued to work with Mobb Deep, releasing Infamy in 2001, Amerikaz Nightmare in 2004, and Blood Money in 2006.

=== 2007–2011: Collaborations and H.N.I.C. Pt. 2 ===
While awaiting trial for a gun possession charge, Prodigy had started work on his second solo album, H.N.I.C. Pt. 2, which was first previewed on his official mixtape, The Return of the Mac. The mixtape's single, together with a video, was called "Mac 10 Handle". Prodigy then released H.N.I.C. Pt. 2 through Voxonic Records, a label in which he was an equity holder. In late 2009, Mobb Deep was released from their contract with 50 Cent's G-Unit label. After spending three years in prison, Prodigy was officially released on March 7, 2011.

Prodigy was featured in a 2009 documentary, Rhyme and Punishment, which documented hip-hop artists who had been incarcerated.

In 2011, Prodigy released a free EP called The Ellsworth Bumpy Johnson EP, his first project after being released from prison.

On April 21, a song titled "The Type", with Currensy, was released on Currensy's free album Covert Coup.

In 2011, Prodigy released his autobiography, My Infamous Life: The Autobiography of Mobb Deep's Prodigy.

=== 2013–2014: The Infamous Mobb Deep ===
In 2013, Prodigy released his second collaboration album with the Alchemist, titled Albert Einstein. On April 1, 2014, Mobb Deep released The Infamous Mobb Deep, their eighth studio album. In August 2016, he released an untitled EP of five tracks, in partnership with BitTorrent, an association that Prodigy had been working up for a while.

== Books ==
In 2011, Prodigy released his autobiography, My Infamous Life: The Autobiography of Mobb Deep's Prodigy. It was co-written with Laura Checkoway and published by Touchstone Books.

In 2013 Prodigy co-wrote the urban crime novel H.N.I.C. with British author Steven Savile. It was published by Akashic / Infamous Books. They also co-wrote a second novel, Ritual, that was released in 2015 by Akashic.

Prodigy co-wrote a cookbook with Kathy Iandoli titled Commissary Kitchen: My Infamous Prison Cookbook. It features a foreword by chef and food personality Eddie Huang and was published in 2016 by Infamous Books.

== Legal issues ==
The following is a brief timeline and chronology of some of the legal issues that Prodigy faced during his life:

- November 6, 2003, Prodigy was arrested in Cohoes, New York, and charged with third degree criminal possession of a weapon and unlawful possession of cannabis. Police reportedly recovered a .25 caliber handgun and cannabis on his person.
- October 26, 2006, Prodigy was arrested in New York City and charged with criminal possession of a weapon. He was pulled over in a $120,000 customized bulletproof SUV after making an illegal u-turn around 2:15 AM. After conducting a search of the vehicle, police recovered a .22-caliber handgun in the center console.
- October 8, 2007, Prodigy was sentenced to serve 3 1/2 years in prison for illegal possession of a firearm. Originally facing a mandatory sentence of 15 years in prison, Prodigy struck a deal with the prosecution, and pleaded guilty in exchange for the shorter prison sentence.
- March 7, 2011, Prodigy was released from Mid-State Correctional Facility in Marcy, New York, after serving three years for criminal possession of a weapon. His sentence was reduced by six months for good behavior and he remained on parole until 2014.

== Feuds ==
=== Death Row ===
From 1995 to 1997, the media-fueled East Coast–West Coast hip hop rivalry was occurring. This started when Tha Dogg Pound released "New York, New York," to which Mobb Deep took offense, as, in addition to the lyrics, the song's music video portrayed New York buildings being stomped on by Dogg Pound members. In response, Mobb Deep with Capone-N-Noreaga and Tragedy Khadafi released "LA, LA". 2Pac dissed Mobb Deep (along with The Notorious B.I.G.) in "Hit 'Em Up" where, in the outro of the song, he made a remark in clear reference to Prodigy's sickle cell anemia. Mobb Deep responded in a track called "Drop A Gem On 'Em" which was released as a single 2 weeks before 2Pac was murdered. 2Pac also dissed Mobb Deep on the song "Against All Odds" and "Bomb First (My Second Reply)" which were released after his death. But Prodigy later sampled 2Pac's voice from a freestyle for the chorus on the song "Return of the Mac" (a.k.a. "New York Shit") on his album with the same name.

=== Def Squad ===
On The Infamous track "The Infamous Prelude", Prodigy made remarks about rappers who rap about "smoking weed" and talk about "space shit". Def Squad took offense from this, but the feud was settled when Prodigy and Keith Murray met at a video shoot. The feud was rekindled when Prodigy again referenced "space shit" in his appearance on LL Cool J's "I Shot Ya" which also featured Murray. Murray saw Prodigy at a club one night and punched him. Prodigy recalled the altercation and threatened Murray in the song "In the Long Run" on Hell on Earth. Murray released a song "Call My Name" on his Enigma album dissing Mobb Deep. The feud seemed to die down until Prodigy dissed Murray again in his 2004 song "Bad Blood." Murray has responded with numerous songs since. The feud has since died down, with the two sharing a photograph together with Busta Rhymes on social media. On Twitter, The reconciliation was confirmed by Prodigy in response to the photo not long after.

=== Jay-Z ===
Prodigy's issues with Jay-Z began when he took offense to a lyric on the 1998 single, "Money, Cash, Hoes", which Jay rapped, "It's like New York's been soft ever since Snoop came through and crush the building", alluding to a scene where Snoop Dogg kicked down several landmarks and skyscrapers around New York City on the music video for the East Coast diss track, "New York, New York", which Tragedy Khadafi, Capone-N-Noreaga and Mobb Deep responded to with "LA, LA".

During Hot 97's annual Summer Jam festival in June 2001, Jay reignited the feud by performing an unfinished acapella version of "Takeover", and while appearing on stage with Michael Jackson, displayed photos of Prodigy during his childhood years taking lessons at a dance studio (including one with him wearing the notable "Thriller" leather jacket, also worn by Jackson in the song's music video). He references this, rapping, "When I was pushin' weight, back in '88, you was a ballerina, I got them pictures, I seen ya. Then, you dropped "Shook Ones", switched your demeanor. Well, we don't believe you. You need more people."

With the release of Mobb Deep's Infamy on December 11, 2001, three months after The Blueprint, the tracks, "Crawlin'" and "The Learning (Burn)", contained disses toward Jay-Z in response. Especially from Prodigy, rapping "You let me get my hands on you so I'm takin' advantage, and that shit that you pulled ain't do me no damage. You don't know me, nigga, but we 'bout to change that shit. Wrap that nigga up like a package".

The feud continued on with more disses from both parties: Jay-Z on "Hovi Baby" and Mobb Deep's Amerikaz Nightmare and various mixtape freestyles. It had since died down soon after.

From prison in 2007, not long before the release of H.N.I.C. Part 2, Prodigy wrote and published an open letter to Jay-Z in which he made some cryptic allegations alluding to the Illuminati theory.

In mid-2011, Prodigy discussed his issues with Jay in an interview with HipHopDX, claiming that he wanted to "fight" him during a weekend he planned at Sean "Diddy" Combs' now-closed restaurant, Justin's. "Sometime after that little statement I made about him, Jay-Z put out the song called ‘The Takeover’ and he did the Summer Jam,” Prodigy explained. “Had my picture up when I was a little kid at my grandmother’s dance school. I thought I was Michael Jackson. Aight, so cool. That was funny to me. I didn’t even take offense to that. That was just funny to me. My whole problem was a whole ‘nother thing", he stated.

Then, in 2012, while appearing on the Breakfast Club with Charlamagne tha God and DJ Envy, Prodigy finally confirmed the photos of his dance classes were taken by his grandmother at Carnegie Hall in Manhattan. "That came from my grandmother’s program. Every year, she did a concert at Carnegie Hall in Lincoln Center and she would do this program booklet for the families and kids that were in the school," he said. "Of course, she had her grandson in there and I thought I was Michael Jackson back in the day, so I had my Mike getup on and all of that. That’s where that picture came from."

After Prodigy's death in 2017, Jay-Z revealed that the two ended their feud in 2012. In an interview with former XXL editor-in-chief Elliott Wilson, he offered condolences to the rapper: "It’s just sad. Blessings to his family. It’s sad. Young, young man."

=== Saigon ===
During an interview, Prodigy stated that he did not like Saigon and Tru-Life (along with many other rappers).

On the night of September 19, 2007, after an impromptu performance by Saigon during a Mobb Deep show, words were exchanged between Saigon and Prodigy. This escalated into an argument, which resulted in a physical altercation when Saigon punched Prodigy twice before leaving the club. Two video versions of the events have since emerged. One version, in slow motion footage, showed Saigon hiding under a table. Another released version of the video, showed Saigon running away from the club. The feud, however, apparently died down, since (in an interview two months before Prodigy's release from prison) Saigon expressed happiness that Prodigy was coming home.

=== Crooked I ===
While in prison, Prodigy wrote a letter about his disillusionment with hip hop and rappers. He directly referenced Crooked I's name in the letter, commenting,

Vibe says 920,000 people voted for it. I would personally b*tch slap all 920,000 of these voters if given the opportunity. Who in the f*ck picked Crooked I, Flo Rida and Rich Boy? How did Vibe approve this?

Crooked I responded in a blog entry, and he challenged Prodigy to a one-on-one fight upon the rapper's release. Following Prodigy's death, Crooked I paid tribute in honor of him by posting an image of him on Instagram.

=== Havoc ===
In July 2012, Prodigy's musical partner, Havoc, wrote a series of derogatory comments about Prodigy on Twitter, including accusing Prodigy of engaging in homosexual relationships in prison. At first, Havoc claimed that his Twitter account was hacked. However, he later confirmed that he wrote the tweets and expressed his frustrations with Prodigy in an interview with AllHipHop. He stated that Mobb Deep was on an "indefinite hiatus" until the duo worked out their differences. Havoc later released a diss track aimed at Prodigy, which was titled "Separated (Real from the Fake)". Prodigy did not respond to Havoc's song and even stated publicly that Mobb Deep would eventually reconcile. In March 2013, the duo announced that they had reconciled and were going on tour.

== Illuminati theory ==
Some hip hop music has been inspired by the theory that a powerful international secret society exists. Often it is referred to as the Illuminati, after the Bavarian secret society founded in 1776. Complex magazine has claimed it was Prodigy who started the interest in the theory. Prodigy had often spoken publicly against the alleged international secret society during his life.

Prodigy rhymed about a secret society in his collaboration with LL Cool J in the song "I Shot Ya (Remix)", from the 1995 album Mr. Smith. In 2008, Prodigy titled a song "Illuminati", from H.N.I.C. Part 2. In his final solo album released during his life, Hegelian Dialectic (The Book of Revelation) (2017), Prodigy also referred to the theory. It was reported that Prodigy was working on a musical about his Illuminati theory at the time of his death.

== Illness and death ==
In an interview with Vibe in November 2000, Johnson spoke about what inspired him to directly address his battle with sickle cell disease in his song "You Can Never Feel My Pain", from his debut studio album H.N.I.C. He attributed his nihilism to the "permanent physical suffering" caused by his lifelong battle with the condition.

On June 18, 2017, Johnson was hospitalized at the Spring Valley Medical Center in Las Vegas, Nevada, due to complications related to sickle cell anemia. He had been performing with Havoc, Ghostface Killah, Onyx, KRS-One, and Ice-T on the Art of Rap Tour in Las Vegas, and he had fallen ill during a meet-and-greet with fans due to hot weather aggravating his condition. Johnson was found unresponsive by hospital staff two days later, and he was pronounced dead. The cause of death was initially thought to have been related to his sickle cell disease, but it was later confirmed as accidental choking from an egg. A lawsuit filed on behalf of Johnson's family by the Gage Law Firm alleged that Spring Valley Medical Center breached their duty of care for Johnson by "failing to maintain a working IV access", and "failing to continuously monitor oxygen levels" as ordered by physicians in the hospital, and that those failures led to Johnson's death.

=== Mobb Deep: Infinite ===
In September 2025, Mobb Deep announced Mobb Deep: Infinite, the duo’s first full-length album since Prodigy’s death in 2017.

Havoc stated that the project incorporates previously unreleased vocals by Prodigy sourced from archived studio sessions recorded across different periods of the group’s career. The material was assembled into a complete album under Havoc’s direction.

Following its release in October 2025, critics noted the album’s significance within the group’s catalogue and highlighted the insight it provides into Prodigy’s artistic development. Commentary also focused on the process of constructing a cohesive project from archival recordings and the album’s role in extending Mobb Deep’s legacy.

The album was released digitally and promoted with the single “Against the World,” which accompanied the official announcement.

== Discography ==
Studio albums

- H.N.I.C. (2000)
- Return of the Mac (2007)
- H.N.I.C. Pt. 2 (2008)
- H.N.I.C. 3 (2012)
- The Bumpy Johnson Album (2012)
- Hegelian Dialectic (The Book of Revelation) (2017)

Posthumous studio albums

- The Hegelian Dialectic 2: The Book of Heroine (2022)
- The Hegelian Dialectic 3: The Book of the Dead (TBA)

Collaboration albums

- Product of the 80's (with Big Twins & Un Pacino) (2008)
- Albert Einstein (with the Alchemist) (2013)
- Young Rollin Stonerz (with Boogz Boogetz) (2014)

== Filmography ==
- Murda Muzik (1999)
- Full Clip (2004)
- Blackout (2007)
- Rhyme and Punishment (2011)

== Publications ==
- Albert "Prodigy" Johnson; Laura Checkoway (2012). My Infamous Life: The Autobiography of Mobb Deep's Prodigy. Touchstone Books. ISBN 978-1-4391-0319-7.
- Albert "Prodigy" Johnson; Steven Savile (2013). H.N.I.C: An Infamous Novella. Akashic Books. ISBN 978-1-61775-236-0.
- Albert "Prodigy" Johnson; Kathy Iandoli (2016). Commissary Kitchen: My Infamous Prison Cookbook. Infamous Books. ISBN 978-0-9971462-3-3.
- Albert "Prodigy" Johnson; Kathy Iandoli (2017). The State vs. Albert "Prodigy" Johnson. Infamous Books. ISBN 978-0-9971462-0-2.
