= The Bumpy Johnson Album =

Mixtape by Prodigy
- Released: October 2, 2012
- Recorded: 2011–2012
- Genre: Hip hop
- Length: 50:43
- Label: Infamous Records
- Producers: The Alchemist, Sid Roams, S.C., King Benny

Prodigy chronology
H.N.I.C. 3 (2012)	The Bumpy Johnson Album (2012)	Albert Einstein (2013)

The Bumpy Johnson Album is an mixtape by American rapper Prodigy of Mobb Deep. The mixtape was released on October 2, 2012. The album was released exclusively to digital download retailers. The album is his second release in 2012 following H.N.I.C. Part 3 that was released two months earlier. Half of the songs on the album were previously released on The Ellsworth Bumpy Johnson EP which was released in 2011. The song "Twilight" had a verse by Havoc.

== Critical response ==
Professional ratings
Review scores
Source	Rating
HipHopDX	3.5/5 stars

The Bumpy Johnson Album was met with generally favorable reviews from music critics. Jesse Fairfax of HipHopDX gave the album three and a half stars out of five, saying "The Bumpy Johnson Album celebrates Prodigy's longevity as he continues mastering perseverance, his knack for surviving rough neighborhoods and other general obstacles detailed on "Stronger." While his typically threatening tone is present throughout much of the material, an increased sense of wisdom is found (possibly resulting from his 2008–2011 jail stint) showing potential for further enlightenment down the line. Aside from being subject to repetitive self-important content regarding his accomplished act, fans should wind up reassured this dynamic emcee is back on the right track holding his own without a partner or popular misplaced features to boost his visibility."

== Track listing ==
No.	Title	Producer(s)	Length
1.	"Change"	Sid Roams	2:31
2.	"The One and Only"	The Alchemist	3:55
3.	"Told Ya’ll"	Sid Roams	4:29
4.	"Go Off"	Sid Roams	4:25
5.	"Recipe for Murder"	S.C.	4:24
6.	"Hitman"	King Benny	3:59
7.	"Medicine Man"	The Alchemist	3:37
8.	"For One Night Only"	The Alchemist	5:16
9.	"Twilight"	Sid Roams	3:20
10.	"Black Devil"	Sid Roams	3:58
11.	"Stronger"	King Benny	4:19
12.	"No One Can Do It Like This"	Sid Roams	1:53
