= Rómulo Guardia =

Venezuelan film producer (born 1961)

Rómulo Guardia Granier (born 13 September 1961) is a Venezuelan film producer.

== Film/production career background ==
Guardia was educated in France, England, and the University of California, San Diego in the United States. He started his career in the late 1980s directing video clips, music shows and spots for record companies such as Polygram, MCA, WEA, Sony Music and Deutsche Grammophon. During this period he worked with renowned artists such as Menudo, Desorden Publico, Julio Iglesias and the New World Symphony.

In 1993 he became one the original MTV Miami team members that created MTV Latino and was instrumental in the launching of the station in 1993. While at MTV, Guardia directed and produced shows as MTV International with Daisy Fuentes, In Situ, Rock n´Gol and Pink Floyd´s Division Bell Concert (Miami).

Later in 1997, Rómulo Guardia accepted a directorial position with Discovery Networks, where he is credited with setting up and directing the production and post production teams at the Discovery Television Center in Miami.

== List of productions ==
=== Features ===
- Titanic Live
- Inside Titanic
- Eco Challenge ´98 Morocco and Eco Challenge '99 Argentina,
- Wild Discovery,
- Discovery News,
- Breakfast with Frost (BBC)

=== Specials ===
- Jorge Luis Borges: The Man in the Mirror

=== Other ===
In addition he created and directed high-profile branded film spots for clients such as Kodak, IBM, Jeep, Sony and MasterCard.

== Awards ==
His creative work was recognized with the Gold Promax/BDA, Peer, Gold Telly and Gold and Silver Addy Awards.

== Current work ==
He was appointed Vice President of Development & New Media at RCTV (Radio Caracas Television, Channel 2), a TV network in Venezuela. Romulo has developed shows such as Archivo Criminal Archivos del Mas Alla Sonoclips and Chatodromo among many others. He has executive-produced three Movies of the Week, Chupacabra, La Sayona and Maria Lionza, and La Rumba de Fin de Mundo (Party ´till the End of the World) is Rómulo's long format directorial debut.

In 2008, Guardia adapted, produced and directed El Señor Presidente. The film earned several awards such as San Francisco Frozen Film Festival and Strasbourg Int Film Festival and was showcased in Los Angeles Latino Int. Film Festival, South Africa Int Film Festival,London International Film Festival, New York Independent Film Fest and the Chicago Latino Film Festival

Romulo manages a digital television and media center in Caracas, Angostura Media. Angostura Media launched in 2018 the ZUT.tv project, a 3 screen TV interactive music network dedicated to all genres of music for Hispanic Millennials and GenZs.
