= Hegelian Dialectic (The Book of Revelation) =

Studio album by Prodigy
- Released: January 20, 2017
- Recorded: 2015–2016
- Genres: Political hip-hop; conscious hip-hop
- Length: 35:13
- Label: Infamous
- Producers: The Alchemist; Beat Butcha; El RTNC; Budgie Beats; Mimosa; Jordan Reid; Knxwledge; Mo Betta; Mark the Beast

Prodigy chronology
Young Rollin Stonerz (2014)	Hegelian Dialectic (The Book of Revelation) (2017)	The Hegelian Dialectic 2: The Book of Heroine (2022)

Singles from Hegelian Dialectic (The Book of Revelation)
- 1. "Tyranny" Released: February 2, 2016; 2. "Mafuckin U$A" Released: January 22, 2017

Hegelian Dialectic (The Book of Revelation) is the sixth studio album by American rapper Prodigy. The album was released on January 20, 2017, exactly five months before his death, through his label Infamous Records, and features a guest appearance from Brooklyn rapper Cash Bilz. It serves as the first installment in Prodigy's planned Hegelian Dialectic trilogy of albums; it was posthumously followed by The Hegelian Dialectic 2: The Book of Heroine in 2022.

== Background ==
The album features a single guest appearance from Cash Bilz (stylized as Ca$h Bilz), a then-rising artist in the hip-hop scene. Prodigy's choice to include a relatively unknown artist was in line with his desire to push boundaries and challenge the status quo, reflected in the philosophical themes of the album.

== Concept and themes ==
The album is named after the philosophical concept Hegelian dialectic. It is an argument process explaining the progress of history as being the conflict of ideas, where the interactions between thesis and anti-thesis create synthesis. This idea is the logical foundation stone for Karl Marx and Friedrich Engels' theory of history as class struggle, according to which the conditions of societal production develop until the oppressed classes necessarily overthrow the oppressor class. This philosophical concept was reflected throughout the album, with songs addressing societal struggles, economic disparities, and political upheaval.

== Production and release ==
Production for the album came from Beat Butcha, Knxwledge, and the Alchemist, among others. Hegelian Dialectic was recorded and mixed by Joe the Engine Ear. It was the last album to be released during his lifetime prior to his death in June 2017, which was caused by accidental asphyxiation. The album was intended to be the first in a series of three albums he planned to release over the course of several months, with the two sequels entitled The Book of Heroine and The Book of the Dead. The second installment, The Book of Heroine, would eventually receive a posthumous release in September 2022, over five years after The Book of Revelation.

== Critical reception ==
Hegelian Dialectic received generally positive reviews, with critics praising the new politically driven and socially conscious tone, a notable change from Prodigy's previous work. Adam Seyum of Music Connection gave the album eight out of ten stars, saying "With songs like 'Mystic', 'Tyranny' and 'Spiritual War,' [Prodigy] encourages listeners to open up their third eye and observe 'the system' meticulously." Darryl Robinson of XXL wrote, "While Hegelian Dialectic is a solid effort with strong, replay-worthy tracks and valuable lyrical gems, Prodigy's words may get lost in a generation of hip-hop consumers more concerned with lit vibes than music of substance."

== Track listing ==
Hegelian Dialectic (The Book of Revelation) track listing
No.	Title	Producer(s)	Length
1.	"Intro"		1:10
2.	"Mystic"	The Alchemist	3:10
3.	"Broken Rappers"	Beat Butcha	2:12
4.	"Tyranny"	El RTNC	3:01
5.	"Mafuckin U$A"	Budgie Beats	2:41
6.	"Mic-rocosm"	Mimosa	2:33
7.	"As If"	Budgie Beats; Jordan Reid	2:46
8.	"New Balance" (Interlude)		0:20
9.	"Snakes"	Beat Butcha	2:40
10.	"The Good Fight"	Knxwledge	3:05
11.	"Mr. President" (Interlude)		0:38
12.	"Spiritual War"	Beat Butcha	3:21
13.	"No Religion"	Mo Betta	3:29
14.	"Hunger Pangs" (featuring Cash Bilz)	Mark the Beast	4:07
Total length:			35:13

Deluxe edition (bonus tracks)
No.	Title	Producer(s)	Length
15.	"PHD"		3:32
16.	"Broken Apple"	Knxwledge	2:05
17.	"No Contest"	The Alchemist	2:51
18.	"Bless You"	Mo Betta	3:30
Total length:			47:22
