= H.N.I.C. 3 =

Studio album by Prodigy
- Released: July 3, 2012
- Studio: Plain Truth Ent Studio
- Genre: Hip hop
- Length: 1:04:33
- Label: Infamous Records
- Producers: Alchemist; Beat Butcha; S.C.; Sid Roams; The Colombians; Ty Fyffe; T.I.; Valentino; Young L; Zam

Prodigy chronology
H.N.I.C. 2 (2008)	H.N.I.C. 3 (2012)	The Bumpy Johnson Album (2012)

Alternative cover
- Deluxe Edition artwork

Singles from H.N.I.C. Part 3
- 1. "Gangsta Love" Released: April 17, 2012; 2. "Pretty Thug" Released: June 5, 2012; 3. "Get Money" Released: July 2, 2012

H.N.I.C. 3 is the fourth solo studio album by American hip hop recording artist Prodigy. It was released on July 3, 2012, via Infamous Records, serving as the third and final instalment of the rapper's H.N.I.C. series. Recording sessions took place at Plain Truth Ent Studio. Production was handled by The Alchemist, Beat Butcha, S.C., Ty Fyffe, Young L, Sid Roams, The Colombians, T.I., Valentino, and Zam, with Oh No and Mobetta producing the deluxe edition bonus tracks. It features guest appearances from Esther, Boogz Boogetz, T.I., Vaughn Anthony, Willie Taylor, Wiz Khalifa, and his Mobb Deep cohort Havoc.

The album peaked at number 123 on the Billboard 200, number 16 on the Top R&B/Hip-Hop Albums, number 15 on the Top Rap Albums and number 17 on the Independent Albums in the United States.

== Critical reception ==
Professional ratings
Aggregate scores
Source	Rating
Metacritic	55/100
Review scores
Source	Rating
AllMusic	3.5/5 stars
HipHopDX	2.5/5
RapReviews	4/10
Pitchfork	5.5/10
XXL	2/5

H.N.I.C. 3 was met with mixed or average reviews from music critics. At Metacritic, which assigns a normalized rating out of 100 to reviews from mainstream publications, the album received an average score of 55, based on five reviews.

AllMusic's David Jeffries called it "a back-to-basics return to form with some worthy pop cuts, and it just takes a slight trim and a push of the shuffle button to become worthy of any long-term fan's attention".

In mixed reviews, Jordan Sargent of Pitchfork wrote: "it may actually be best to just pretend that H.N.I.C. 3 ends after the 10th song, because up to that point it's a pretty good, if slightly uninspiring, mixtape". HipHopDX reviewer found "what makes 3 listenable in its darkest moments is the production, where P often struggles to sound comfortable". Pete T. of RapReviews stated: "while the music is consistent and fairly unique in its murkiness, it's not particularly compelling and is a tad stale". Jaeki Cho of XXL resumed: "unfortunately, the third installment of the critically acclaimed series fails to excite".

== Track listing ==
No.	Title	Producer(s)	Length
1.	"Without Rhyme or Reason"	The Alchemist	2:47
2.	"Slept On"	The Alchemist	3:02
3.	"Pretty Thug"	Ty Fyffe	4:10
4.	"My Angel" (featuring Willie Taylor)	Beat Butcha	3:58
5.	"Co-Pilot" (featuring Wiz Khalifa)	The Colombians	4:30
6.	"Live"	The Alchemist	4:26
7.	"Make It Hot"	Young L	4:11
8.	"Get Money" (featuring Boogz Boogetz)	Young L	5:24
9.	"Life Is What You Make It"	S.C.	2:21
10.	"Award Show Life"	S.C.	3:35
11.	"Who You Bullshittin'" (performed by Mobb Deep)	Sid Roams	3:51
12.	"Skull & Bones"	Beat Butcha	3:06
13.	"Smack That Bitch" (featuring Esther)	Valentino	5:50
14.	"Let Me Show You" (featuring Vaughn Anthony)	Ty Fyffe	4:48
15.	"Gangsta Love" (featuring Esther)	Zam	4:26
16.	"What's Happening" (featuring T.I.)	T.I.	4:07
Total length:			1:04:33

Deluxe edition bonus tracks
No.	Title	Producer(s)	Length
17.	"Hate to Love You"	Maurice "Mo Betta" Brown	3:17
18.	"Ms. Bad Ass"	Oh No	2:02
19.	"G-Up"	Oh No	2:43
20.	"Serve 'Em"	The Alchemist	2:25

== Personnel ==
- Albert "Prodigy" Johnson – vocals, executive producer
- William Madison "Willie" Taylor III – vocals (track 4)
- Cameron "Wiz Khalifa" Thomaz – vocals (track 5)
- Jabbar "Boogz Boogetz" Scott – vocals (track 8)
- Kejuan "Havoc" Muchita – vocals (track 11)
- Esther – vocals (tracks: 13, 15)
- Vaughn Anthony – vocals (track 14)
- Clifford "T.I." Harris – vocals & producer (track 16)
- Alan "The Alchemist" Maman – producer (tracks: 1, 2, 6)
- Tyrone Gregory "Ty" Fyffe – producer (tracks: 3, 14)
- Eliot "Beat Butcha" Dubock – producer (tracks: 4, 12)
- The Colombians – producers (track 5)
- Lloyd "Young L" Omadhebo – producer (tracks: 7, 8)
- SC – producer (tracks: 9, 10)
- Joey Chavez – producer (track 11)
- Tavish "Bravo" Graham – producer (track 11)
- Valentino – producer (track 13)
- Zam – producer (track 15)
- Steve Sola – executive producer, recording (tracks: 1, 2, 6), mixing
- Darrell Jones Jr. – recording (tracks: 3–5, 7–10, 12–14)
- Eddie Sancho – mixing (tracks: 11, 15, 16)
- Michael Scott Jones – photography

== Charts ==
Chart (2012)	Peak position
US Billboard 200	123
US Top R&B/Hip-Hop Albums (Billboard)	16
US Top Rap Albums (Billboard)	15
US Independent Albums (Billboard)	17
